= List of marine animals of Australia (temperate waters) =

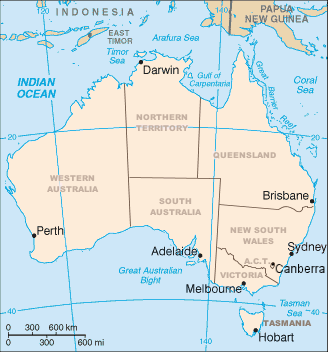
Map of Australia

The list of marine animals of Australia (temperate waters) is a list of marine and shore-based species that form a part of the fauna of Australia. This list includes animals which either live entirely marine lives, or which spend critical parts of their lives at sea.

The geographical range is south of Perth, Western Australia and the border of New South Wales and Queensland, including the whole of the coasts of South Australia and Tasmania and their offshore islands. Tropical species which are also found in this range may also be listed here.

The listed organisms are generally identifiable to the naked eye. Many microscopic animals also inhabit this region.

Ranges are generally given relating to Australian waters. If listed as endemic, they have been found only in the listed range. Others may have much greater ranges.

== Phylum Porifera ==
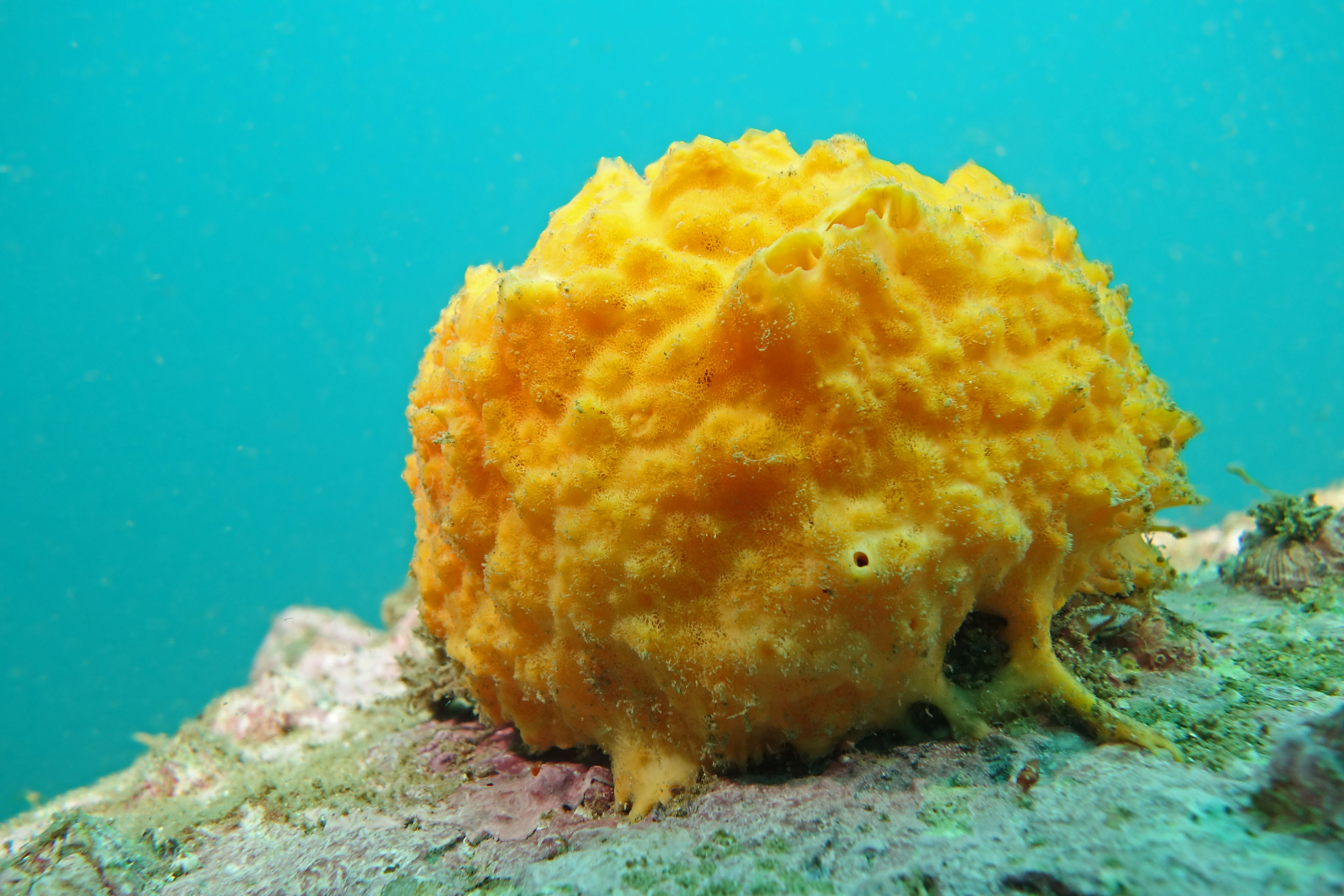
Tethya sp. (Golfball sponge)

- Ancorina geodides (Carter, 1886) Grey ball sponge (Victoria and around Tasmania)
- Aplysilla rosea (Barrois, 1876), Encrusting rose sponge (Around Australia and Tasmania. Also widespread overseas)
- Aplysina lendenfeldi Bergquist, 1980, Lendenfeld's tube sponge (Victoria to central New South Wales and around Tasmania)
- Caulospongia biflabellata Fromont, 1998, Western staircase sponge (Northwest Cape to Albany, WA)
- Chondrilla australiensis Carter, 1873, Liver sponge (Houtman Abrolhos, WA to Sydney, NSW)
- Clathria (Thalysias) cactiformis (Lamarck, 1814), Orange palm sponge (Port Hedland, WA to Byron Bay, NSW and around Tasmania. Also Madagascar, east Africa and Seychelles)
- Cliona sp. Orange dimpled sponge (Eastern Tasmania)
- Dendrilla cactos (Selenka, 1867), Prickly rose sponge (Adelaide, SA to Sydney, NSW and around Tasmania. Also widespread in the Indo-West Pacific region)
- Darwinella sp. Darwin's yellow sponge (Northern Tasmania)
- Echinoclathria axinelloides (Dendy, 1896), Dendy's finger sponge (Port Phillip, Vic and northern Tasmania)
- Echinoclathria leporina (Lamarck, 1814), Orange fan sponge (Ceduna, SA to Sydney, NSW and south to Bicheno, Tasmania)
- Holopsamma arborea (Lendenfeld, 1888) Brown honeycomb sponge (Barrow Island, WA to Sydney, NSW and around Tasmania)
- Holopsamma laminaefavosa Carter, 1885, Cream honeycomb sponge (Fremantle, WA to Noosa, Qld and around Tasmania)
- Iophon sp. Orange pipe sponge (Central South Australia)
- Mycale (Arenochalina) mirabilis (Lendenfeld, 1887) Slimy lemon sponge (Around Australia and Tasmania. Also widespread in the Indo-West Pacific region)
- Polymastia sp. Purple pasta sponge (Central New South Wales)
- Rhizaxinella sp. Pumpkin sponge (Northern Tasmania)
- Spongia sp. Rubber sponge (New South Wales)
- Strepsichordaia caliciformis (Carter, 1885), Green plate sponge (Port Lincoln, SA to Sydney, NSW and around Tasmania)
- Strongylacidon sp. Papillate encrusting sponge (Eastern Tasmania)
- Sycon sp. 1 (South Australia to Victoria and round Tasmania)
- Sycon sp. 2 (Western Australia to Victoria and round Tasmania)
- Syphonochalina sp. Apricot tube sponge (Eastern Tasmania)
- Tedania (Tedania) anhelans (Lieberkühn, 1859) syn. T digitata Apricot bulbous sponge (Around Australia and Tasmania. Also widespread overseas)
- Tethya bergquistae Hooper in Hooper & Wiedenmayer, 1994, Southern golfball sponge (South Australia to Victoria, Northern Tasmania, also New Zealand)
- Tethya ingalli Bowerbank, 1858, Ingall's golfball sponge (Shark Bay to Albany, WA, and Port Philip, Vic to Sydney, NSW Also tropical Indian Ocean.)
- Thorecta sp. Cream columnar sponge (Eastern Tasmania)

== Phylum Cnidaria ==
=== Class Hydrozoa ===
==== Order Hydroida ====
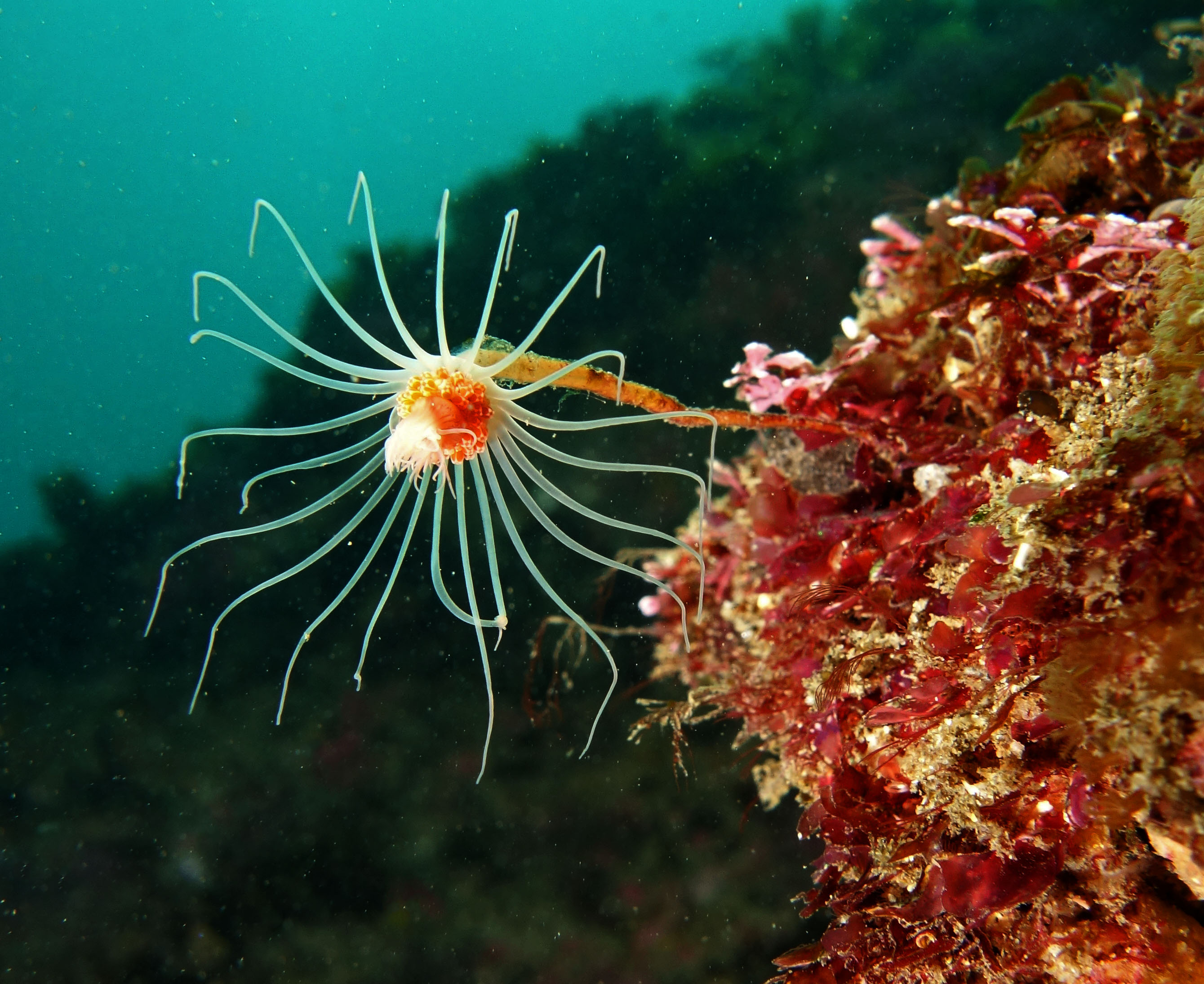
Ralpharia magnifica (Magnificent hydroid)

- Aequorea eurhodina Peron and Lesueur, 1809, Umbrella jelly (Eastern Tasmania to southern New South Wales) (possibly A. forskalea)
- Gymnangium ascidioides (Bale, 1882), Bale's feather hydroid (Victoria and eastern Tasmania)
- Gymnangium superbum (Bale, 1882), Superb feather hydroid (Southern WA to Victoria and around Tasmania)
- Halopteris campanula (Busk, 1852) Yellow feather hydroid (South Australia to Queensland and around Tasmania. Also widespread overseas)
- Nemertesia procumbens Spencer's hydroid (Spencer, 1891) (St Francis Island, SA to eastern Victoria and around Tasmania)
- Pennaria disticha Goldfuss, 1820, Salt and pepper feather hydroid (Perth, WA to New South Wales but absent from Victoria)(recorded as Halocordyle disticha)
- Porpita porpita (Linnaeus, 1758), Porpita sailor (Around Australia and Tasmania. Also widespread overseas.)
- Ralpharia magnifica Watson, 1980, Magnificent hydroid (South Australia to Victoria and around Tasmania)
- Solanderia fusca (Grey, 1868), Dusky hydroid (Western Australia to Queensland and northern Tasmania. Also Lord Howe Island.)
- Stereotheca elongata (Lamouroux, 1816), Elongate seagrass hydroid (Western Australia to New South Wales and around Tasmania. Also widespread overseas)
- Turritopsis nutricula (McCrady, 1857), Red thimble jelly (Western Australia to New South Wales and around Tasmania. Also widespread overseas.)
- Velella velella (Linnaeus, 1758). By-the-wind-sailor (Around Australia and Tasmania. Also widespread overseas.)

==== Order Limnomedusae ====
- Olindias phosphorica (Delle Chiage, 1841), Phosphorus jelly (Tropical Australia south to southern WA and to southern NSW. Also widespread overseas.)
- Olindias singularis Browne, 1905, Orange saucer jelly (Tropical Australia south to South Australia and to Southern New South Wales. Also widespread in the Indo-West Pacific region.)

==== Order Siphonophora ====
- Physalia physalis(Linnaeus, 1766), Bluebottle, Portuguese man o' war (Around Australia and Tasmania.Also widespread overseas)

==== Order Stylasterina ====
- Stylaster sp. Western pink hydrocoral (South western Western Australia)
- Stylaster brunneus Boschma, 1970, Lord Howe hydrocoral (Lord Howe Island, Norfolk Island. Also New Caledonia and New Zealand)

=== Class Anthozoa ===
==== Order Actiniaria ====
- Actinia tenebrosa Farquhar, 1898, Waratah anemone (Shark Bay, WA to Heron Island, Queensland and around Tasmania. Also New Zealand)
- Actiniid sp.1 Bryozoan anemone, (Victoria to central New South Wales)
- Actiniid sp.2 Speckled seawhip anemone, (Central New South Wales)
- Actiniid sp.3 White striped anemone, (Gulfs region, South Australia)
- Actinothoe glandulosa Carlgren, 1954, White anemone, (Southwestern WA)
- Anthopleura aureoradiata (Stuckey, 1909), Mudflat anemone (Port Sinclair, SA to Mallacoota, Victoria and around Tasmania Also New Zealand)
- Anthothoe albocincta (Hutton, 1879), White-striped anemone, (Ceduna, South Australia to New South Wales and around Tasmania. Also new Zealand.)
- Aulactinia veratra (Drayton in Dana, 1846), Green anemone, (Rottnest Island, WA to southern Queensland and around Tasmania)
- Boloceroides sp? Seagrass anemone (Southeastern Tasmania)
- Dorfleinia armata (Wassilieff, 1908), Armed anemone, (Tropical Australia south to Perth, WA)
- Epiactis australiensis Carlgren, 1950, Pink tipped anemone, (Gulf St Vincent, SA to Victoria and northern Tasmania)
- Epiactis thompsoni (Coughtrey, 1875), Thompson's anemone, (South Australia)
- Heteractis malu (Haddon and Shackleton, 1893), Pink tipped sand anemone, (Tropical Australia south to Perth, WA. Also widespread in the Indo-West Pacific region)
- Oulactis mcmurrichi (Lager, 1911), Western shellgrit anemone, (Perth WA to Coffin Bay, SA)
- Oulactis muscosa (Drayton in Dana, 1846), Shellgrit anemone, (Spencer Gulf, SA to Southern Queensland and around Tasmania. Also New Zealand)
- Phlyctenactis tuberculosa (Quoy and Gaimard, 1833), Swimming anemone, (Southwestern WA to Byron Bay, NSW and around Tasmania)
- Phlyctenanthus australis Carlgren, 1950, Southern sea anemone, (Ceduna, SA to Sydney, NSW and around Tasmania)
- Tealia sp? Giant orange anemone, (Eastern and southern Tasmania)

==== Order Corallimorpharia ====
(Jewel anemones)

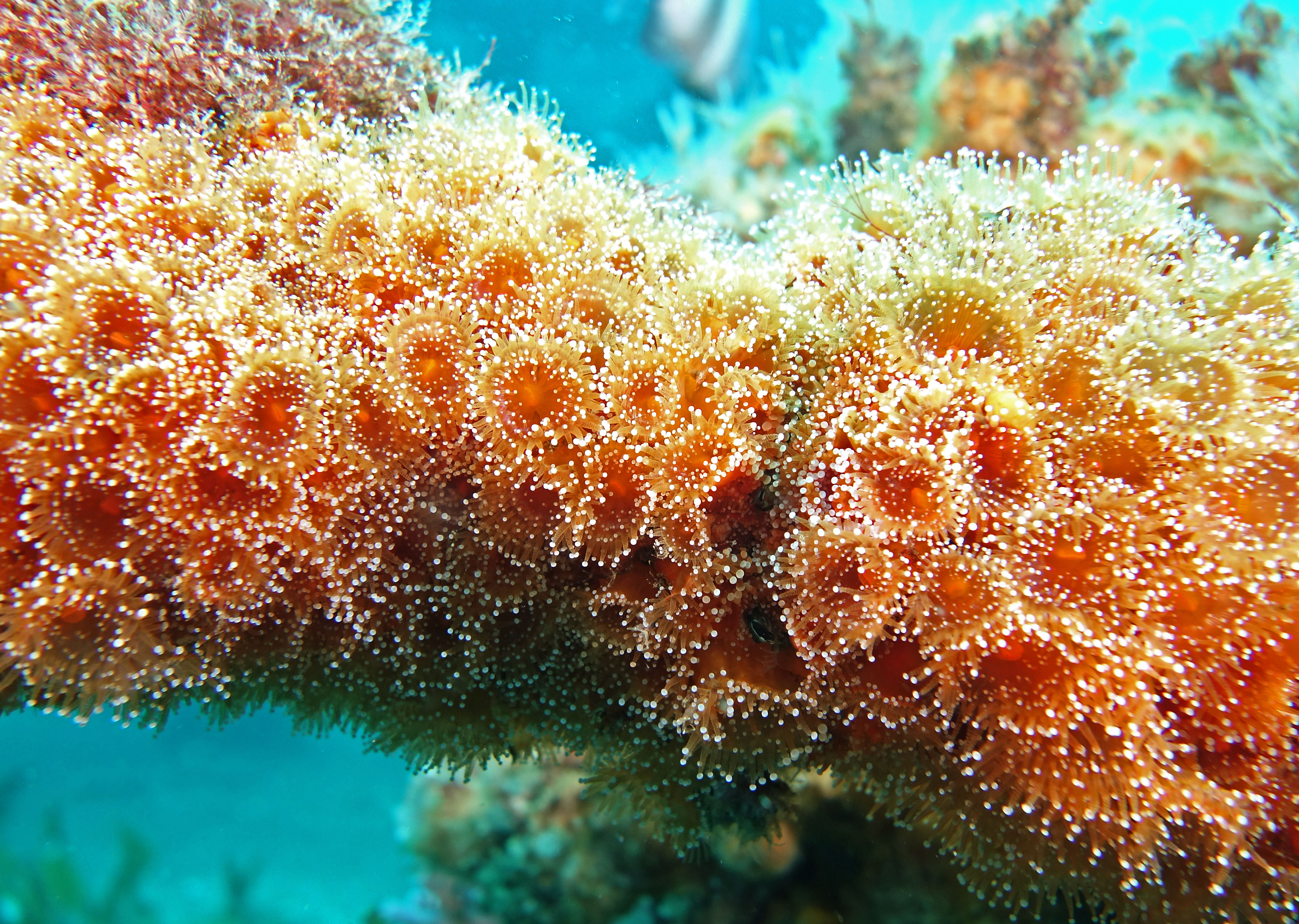
Corynactis australis (Southern jewel anemone)

- Corynactis australis Haddon & Duerden, 1896, Southern jewel anemone, (Port Phillip Bay, Victoria, to New South Wales and around Tasmania.)
- Rhodactis indosinensis Carlgren, 1943, Hairy mushroom anemone, (Tropical Australia south to northern New South Wales.)

==== Order Zoanthiniaria ====
(Zoanthids)

- Epizoanthus sabulosus Cutress, 1971, Encrusting grey zoanthid, (Esperance, Western Australia, to Port Phillip Bay, Victoria, and Flinders Island, Tasmania.)
- Isaurus cliftoni Gray, 1857, Clifton's zoanthid, (Tropical Australia south to Esperance, Western Australia.)
- Palythoa heideri Carlgren, 1954, Heider's zoanthid, (Kalbarri to Rottnest Island, Western Australia.)
- Parazoanthus sp.1 Yellow zoanthid (Cape Northumberland, South Australia, to Jervis Bay, New South Wales, and around Tasmania.)
- ?Parazoanthus anguicomus. Encrusting white zoanthid (Southern Tasmania.)
- Zoanthus praelongus Carlgren, 1954, Finger zoanthid, (Perth to Esperance, Western Australia.)
- Zoanthus robustus Carlgren, 1950, Robust zoanthid, (Ceduna, South Australia, to central Victoria.)

==== Order Scleractinia ====
(Stony corals)

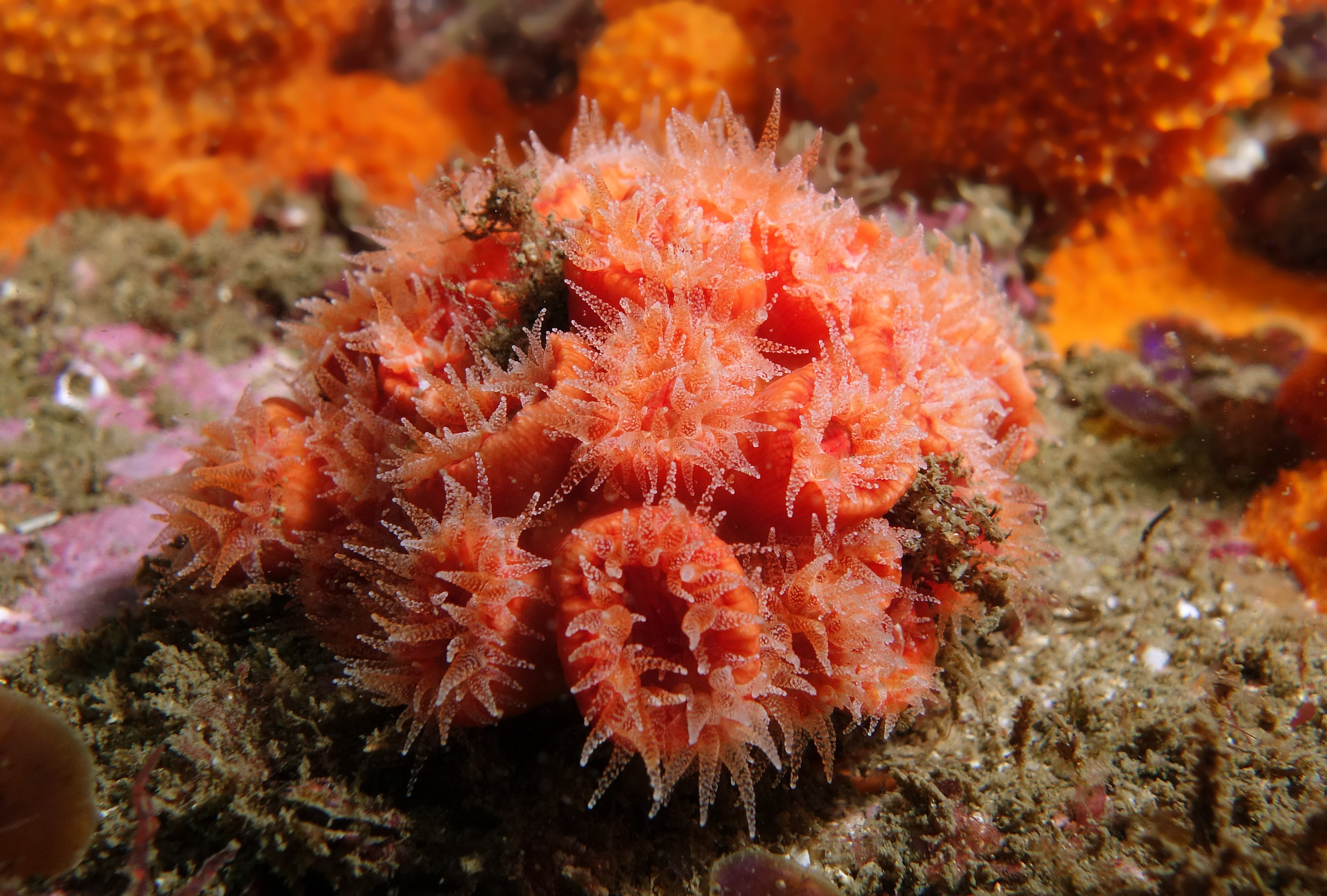
Balanophyllia bairdiana (Orange cup coral)

- Balanophyllia (Balanophyllia) bairdiana Milne Edwards & Haime, 1848, Orange solitary coral, (Port Phillip Bay, Victoria, to southern Queensland and around Tasmania.)
- Coscinaraea mcneilli Wells, 1962, McNeill's coral, (Houtman Abrolhos, Western Australia, to Byron Bay, New South Wales.)
- Coscinaraea marshae Wells, 1962, Marsh's coral, (Houtman Abrolhos, Western Australia, to Pearson Island, South Australia.)
- Culicia tenella Dana, 1846, Little coral, (Perth, Western Australia, to Solitary Islands, New South Wales, and around Tasmania.)
- Homophyllia australis (Milne Edwards & Haime, 1846), Green solitary coral, reported as Scolymia australis, (Rottnest Island, Western Australia, to Port Phillip Bay, Victoria, and Flinders Island, Tasmania. Also Qld and Lord Howe Island.)
- Plesiastrea versipora (Lamarck, 1816), Green coral, (Around Australia and northern Tasmania. Also widespread in the Indo-West Pacific region.)
- Turbinaria reniformis Bernard, 1896, Kidney-shaped coral, (Tropical Australia south to Recherche Archipelago, Western Australia. Also widespread in the Indo-West Pacific region.)

==== Order Ceriantharia ====
(Tube anemones)

- Pachycerianthus sp. Purple-tipped tube anemone (Southwestern Western Australia.)
- Pachycerianthus delwynae Carter, 1995, Banded tube anemone, (Central New South Wales.)
- Pachycerianthus longistriatus Carter, 1995, Striped tube anemone, (Central New South Wales.)

==== Order Antipatheria ====
(Black corals)

- Antipathes sp. Lord Howe black coral (Lord Howe Island)

==== Order Alcyonacea ====
(Octocorals, soft corals, gorgonians, sea whips)

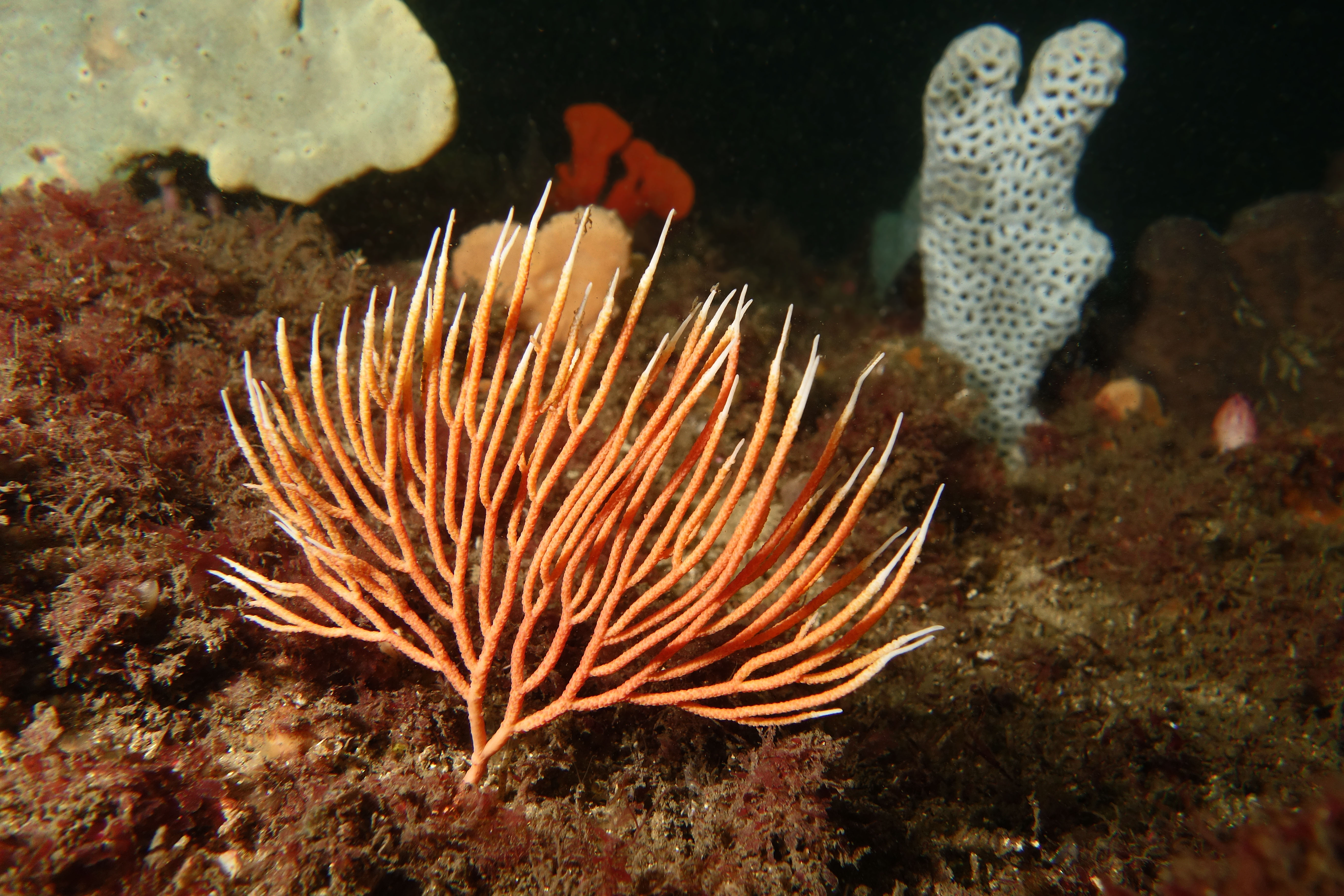
Sphaerokodisis australis (Southern sea fan)

- Acabaria sp. Fragile bramble coral (Tasmania)
- Asperaxis karenae Alderslade, 2006, Bramble coral, (Southern Tasmania.)
- Capnella sp.1 Western soft coral (Mullaloo to Rottnest Island, Western Australia.)
- Capnella sp.2 Granular grey soft coral (Canal Rocks, Western Australia.)
- Capnella erecta Verseveldt, 1977, Erect soft coral, (Cape Jaffa, South Australia, to Gabo Island, Victoria, and around Tasmania.)
- Capnella gaboensis Verseveldt, 1977, Gabo Island soft coral (Waldegrave Island), South Australia, to Port Stephens, New South Wales, and Erith Island, Tasmania.)
- Capnella johnstonei Verseveldt, 1977, Johnstone's soft coral, (Portland, Victoria, to Eden, New South Wales, and around Tasmania.)
- Carijoa sp.1 Jetty octocoral (Southern Western Australia to Gulf St Vincents, South Australia, and New South Wales to Queensland.)
- Carijoa sp.2 Smith's octocoral (South Australia to New South Wales and northern Tasmania.)
- Clavularia sp. Delicate soft coral (Tasmania)
- Dendronephthya sp. Red Lord Howe octocoral (Lord Howe Island.)
- Erythropodium hicksoni (Utinomi, 1972), Encrusting soft coral, (Victoria to central New South Wales and around Tasmania.)
- Melithaea klunzingeri (Kükenthal, 1908), Klunzinger's sea fan, recorded as Mopsella klunzingeri, (Houtman Abrolhos, Western Australia, to Portsea, Victoria.)
- Melithaea zimmeri (Kükenthal, 1908), Zimmer's sea fan, recorded as Mopsella zimmeri, (Western Australia to New South Wales and northern Tasmania.)
- Mopsella sp. Eastern red sea fan (New South Wales)
- Primnoella australasiae (Gray, 1850), Southern sea whip, (Ceduna, South Australia, to Sydney, New South Wales, and around Tasmania.)
- Pteronisis incerta Alderslade, 1998, Indeterminate gorgonian, (South Australia to Victoria and around Tasmania.)
- Pteronisis plumacea (Briggs, 1915), Plumed gorgonian, (Victoria and Tasmania.)
- Sphaerokodisis australis (Thomson & Mackinnon 1911), Southern sea fan, (Jervis Bay to Cape Byron, New South Wales.)
- Zignisis phorinema Alderslade, 1998, Zigzag sea fan, (Jurien Bay to Rottnest Island, Western Australia)

==== Order Pennatulacea ====
(Sea pens)

- Cavernularia sp. Wobbly sea pen (Cockburn Sound, Western Australia.)
- Cavernularia obesa Valenciennes in Milne Edwards & Haime, 1850, Fat sea pen, (Central New South Wales.)
- Sarcoptilus grandis Gray, 1848, Great sea pen, (Albany, Western Australia, to Cape Hawke, New South Wales, and around Tasmania.)

=== Class Scyphozoa ===
(Jellyfish)

==== Order Semaeostomeae ====
(Scallop-margined jellies)

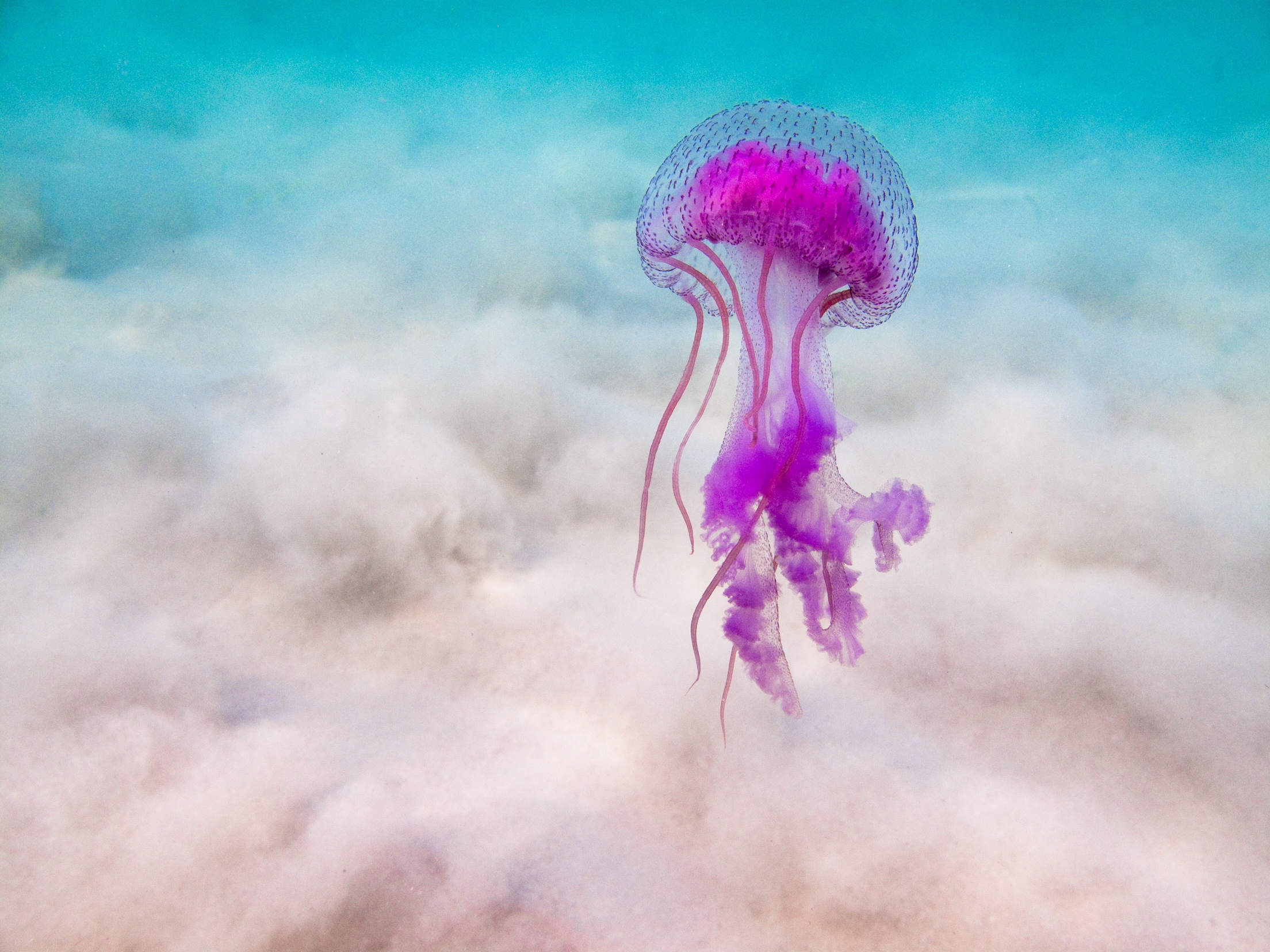
Pelagia noctiluca (Purple-streaked jelly)

- Aurelia aurita (Linnaeus, 1758), Moon jelly, (Western Australia to northern Qld and around Tasmania. Also widespread overseas.)
- Chrysaora sp. Brown-flecked jelly (Gulf St Vincent, South Australia, to Port Phillip Bay, Victoria.)
- Cyanea annaskala von Ledenfeld, 1884, Lion's mane jelly, (Victoria and around Tasmania.)
- Pelagia noctiluca (Forsskål, 1775), Purple-streaked jelly, (Around Australia, including Tasmania. Also widespread overseas.)

==== Order Rhizostomeae ====
(Lobed jellies)

- Catostylus mosaicus (Quoy & Gaimard, 1824), Mosaic jelly, jelly blubber, (Port Phillip Bay, Victoria, to Torres Strait, Queensland.)
- Phyllorhiza punctata von Lendenfeld, 1884, White-spotted jelly, (Tropical Australia south to southern Western Australia and to Sydney, New South Wales. Also in the Indo-West Pacific region.)
- Pseudorhiza haeckeli Haacke, 1884, Haeckel's jelly (Northern Territory around Western Australia to Victoria and northern Tasmania.)

=== Class Cubozoa ===
==== Order Cubomedusae ====
(Box jellies, cubomedusans)

- Carybdea rastoni Haacke, 1886, Southern jimble, (Southern Western Australia to New South Wales and south to Bicheno, Tasmania. Also widespread in the Indo-West Pacific region.)

== Phylum Ctenophora ==
- Beroe cucumis Fabricius, 1780; Cardinal's hat; (Western Australia to New South Wales and around Tasmania.)
- Bolinopsis sp. Eastern comb jelly; (New South Wales.)
- Leucothea sp. Southern comb jelly; (Victoria to central New South Wales and around Tasmania.)

== Phylum Platyhelminthes ==
- Callioplana marginata Stimpson, 1857; Orange-margined flatworm; (Tropical Australia south to Merimbula, New South Wales. Also in the Indo-West Pacific region.)
- Notoplana australis (Schmarda, 1859); Southern flatworm; (South Australia to Sydney, New South Wales, and around Tasmania. Also New Zealand.)
- Pseudoceros lividus Prudhoe, 1981; Blue flatworm; (Gulf St Vincent and northern Kangaroo Island, South Australia.)
- Thysanozoon sp. Warty flatworm; (Central South Australia.)

== Phylum Annelida ==
=== Class Oligochaeta ===
- Olavius albidus (Jamieson, 1977), Jamieson's worm, (Rottnest Island, Western Australia, to Capricorn Group, Queensland.)

=== Class Hirudinea ===
- Branchellion sp. Stingray leech; (New South Wales.)

=== Class Polychaeta ===
Family Polynoidae – Scale worms

Family Eunicidae

- Eunice laticeps Ehlers, 1868; Iridescent biting worm; (South Australia to central New South Wales and around Tasmania.)
- Lepidonotus melanogrammus Haswell, 1883; Dark-marked scale worm; (Western Australia to New South Wales and around Tasmania.)

Family Nereididae – Ragworms

- Perinereis sp. Western ragworm; (South Australia.)

Family Onuphidae

- Diopatra dentata Kinberg, 1865; Sydney parchment worm; (New South Wales.)

Family Opheliidae

- Armandia intermedia Fauvel, 1902; Fauvel's worm; (Western Australia to southern Queensland and around Tasmania.)

Family Syllidae – Frilled worms

- Typosyllis sp. Zebra syllid? (Central New South Wales)

Family Terebellidae

- Eupolymnia koorangiaHutchings & Glasby, 1988; Orange tangle worm; (Around the Australian mainland and Tasmania.)

Family Pectenariidae

- Pectinaria antipoda Schmarda, 1861; Tusk worm; (Broome, Western Australia, to Heron Island, Queensland, and around Tasmania.)

Family Sabellariidae

- Idanthyrsus pennatus Peters, 1855; Eastern reefworm, coral worm; (Victoria to southern Queensland.)

Family Sabellidae

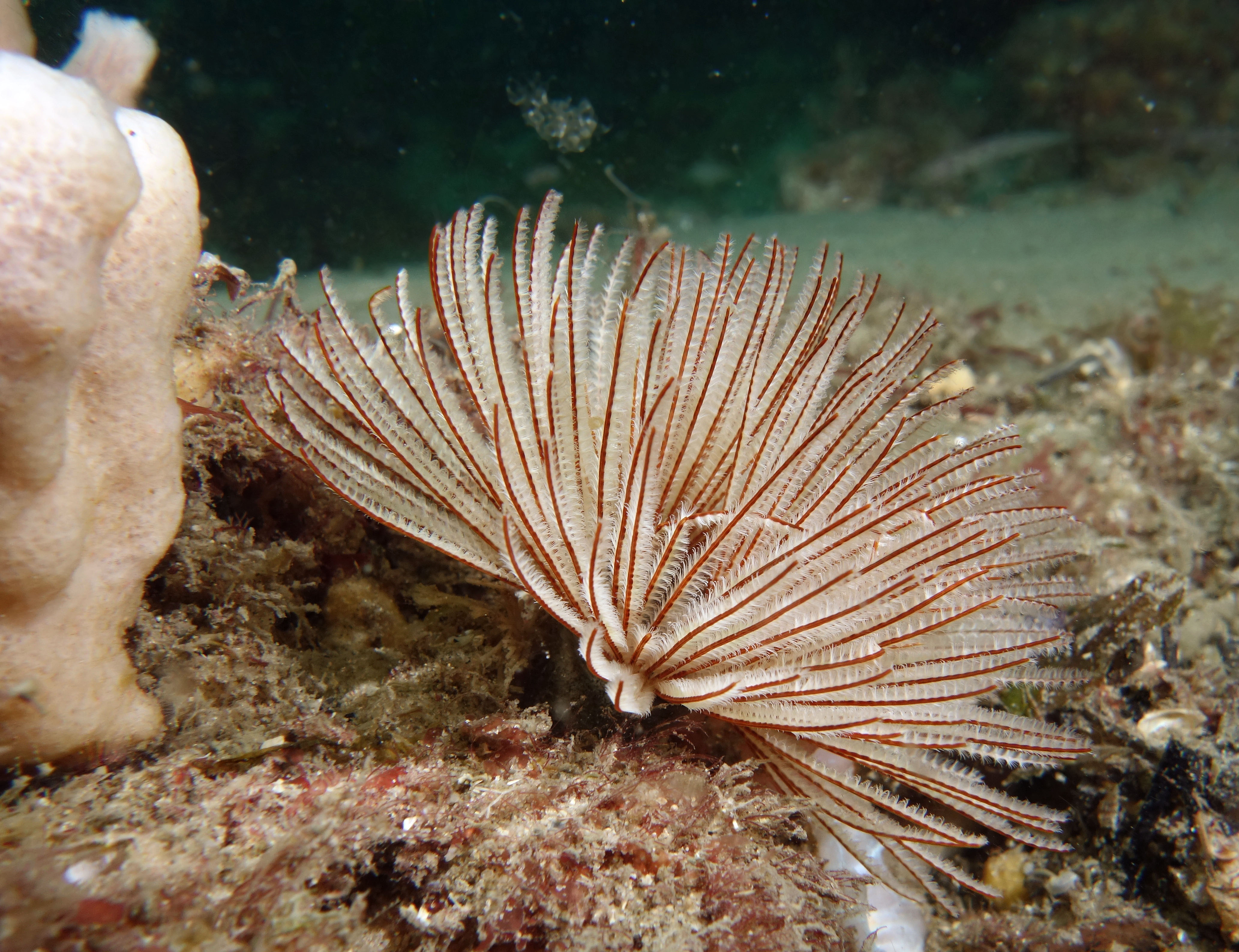
Sabellastarte australiensis (Southern fanworm)

- ?Myxicola infundibulum (Montagu, 1808); Purple sausage worm; (Fremantle, Western Australia, to Jervis Bay, New South Wales, and northern and eastern Tasmania.)
- Sabellastarte australiensis (Haswell, 1884); Southern fanworm; (Western Australia to New South Wales and around Tasmania.)
- Sabella spallanzani (Gmelin, 1791); Giant fanworm; (Cockburn Sound, Western Australia, to Port Phillip Bay, Victoria. Also Europe.)

Family Serpulidae

- Protula sp. Red tubeworm; (Southern Western Australia to South Australia.)
- Filograna implexa Berkeley, 1835; Tangled tubeworm; (Western Australia to New South Wales and around Tasmania. Also widespread overseas.)
- Galeolaria caespitosa Lamarck, 1818; Sydney coral worm; (Perth, Western Australia, to Hervey Bay, Queensland, and around Tasmania.)
- Serpula sp. Orange tubeworm (South Australia to New South Wales.)

Family Spirorbidae

== Phylum Echiuroidea ==
- Metabonellia haswelli (Johnston & Tiegs, 1920); Haswell's proboscis worm; (Fremantle, Western Australia, to Sydney, New South Wales, and around Tasmania.)

== Phylum Sipuncula ==
- Phascolosoma annulatum (Hutton, 1879); Ringed peanut worm; (Ceduna, South Australia, to Kilcunda, Victoria, and around Tasmania. Also New Zealand.)
- Phascolosoma noduliferum Stimpson, 1855; Nodular peanut worm (Hopetoun, Western Australia, to Port Stephens (New South Wales), and around Tasmania.)

== Phylum Arthropoda ==
=== Subphylum Chelicerata ===
==== Class Pycnogonida ====
(Sea spiders, pycnogonids)

- Anoplodactylus evansi Clark, 1963; Evan's sea spider; (South Australia to central New South Wales.)
- Meridionale ambigua (Stock, 1956); Yellow sea spider; recorded as Pseudopallene ambigua; (Investigator Group, South Australia, to Sydney, New South Wales, and around Tasmania.)
- Nymphon aequidigitatum Haswell, 1884; Apricot sea spider; (Gulf St Vincent, South Australia, to Byron Bay, New South Wales, and around Tasmania.)
- Pallenopsis gippslandiae Stock, 1954; Gippsland sea spider; (Eastern Victoria to Double Island, Queensland, and eastern and southern Tasmania.)
- Stylopallene longicauda Stock 1973; Striped sea spider; (Western Port, Victoria, and around Tasmania.)

=== Subphylum Crustacea ===
==== Class Cirripedia ====
(Barnacles)

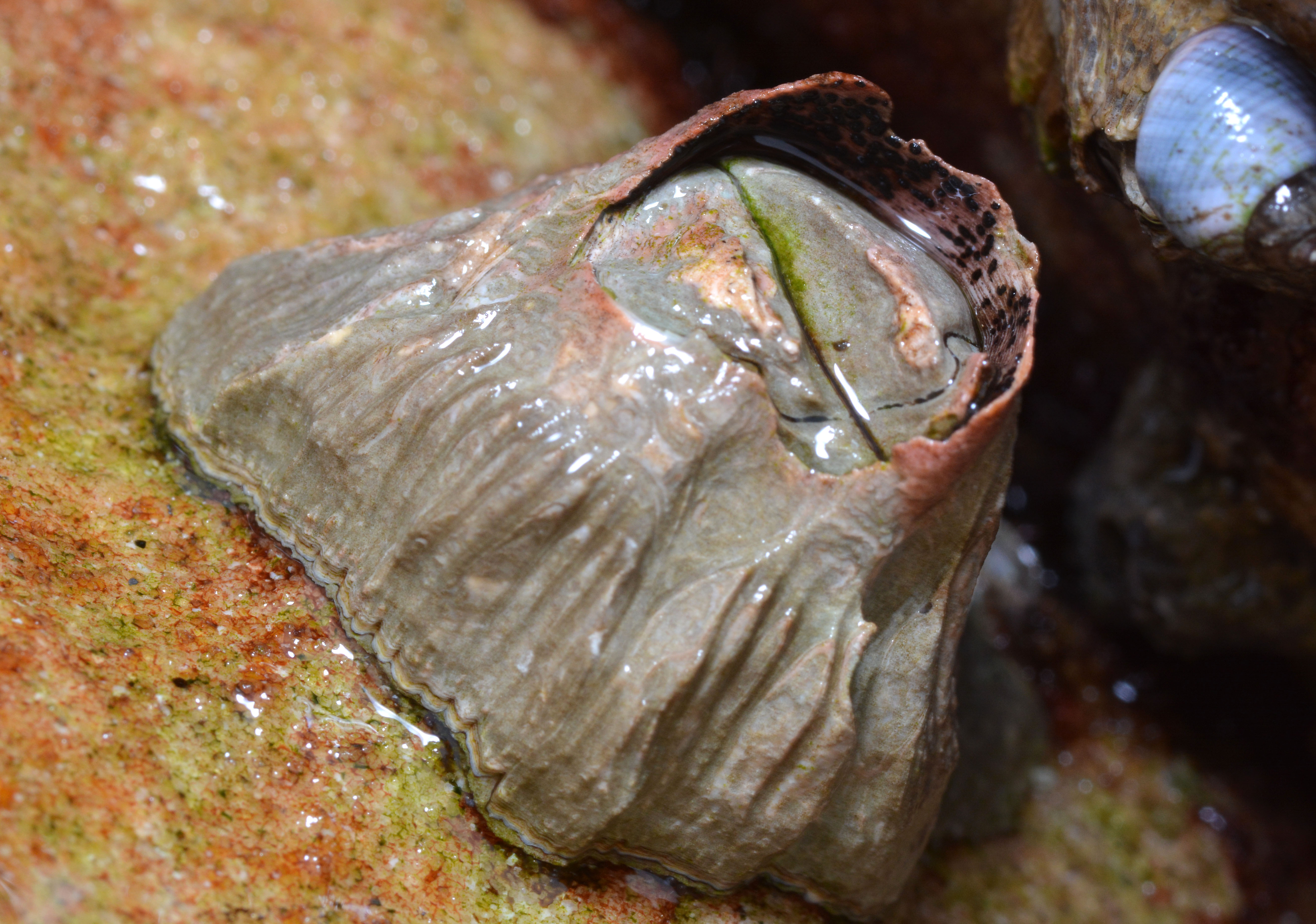
Tesseropora rosea (Rosy barnacle)

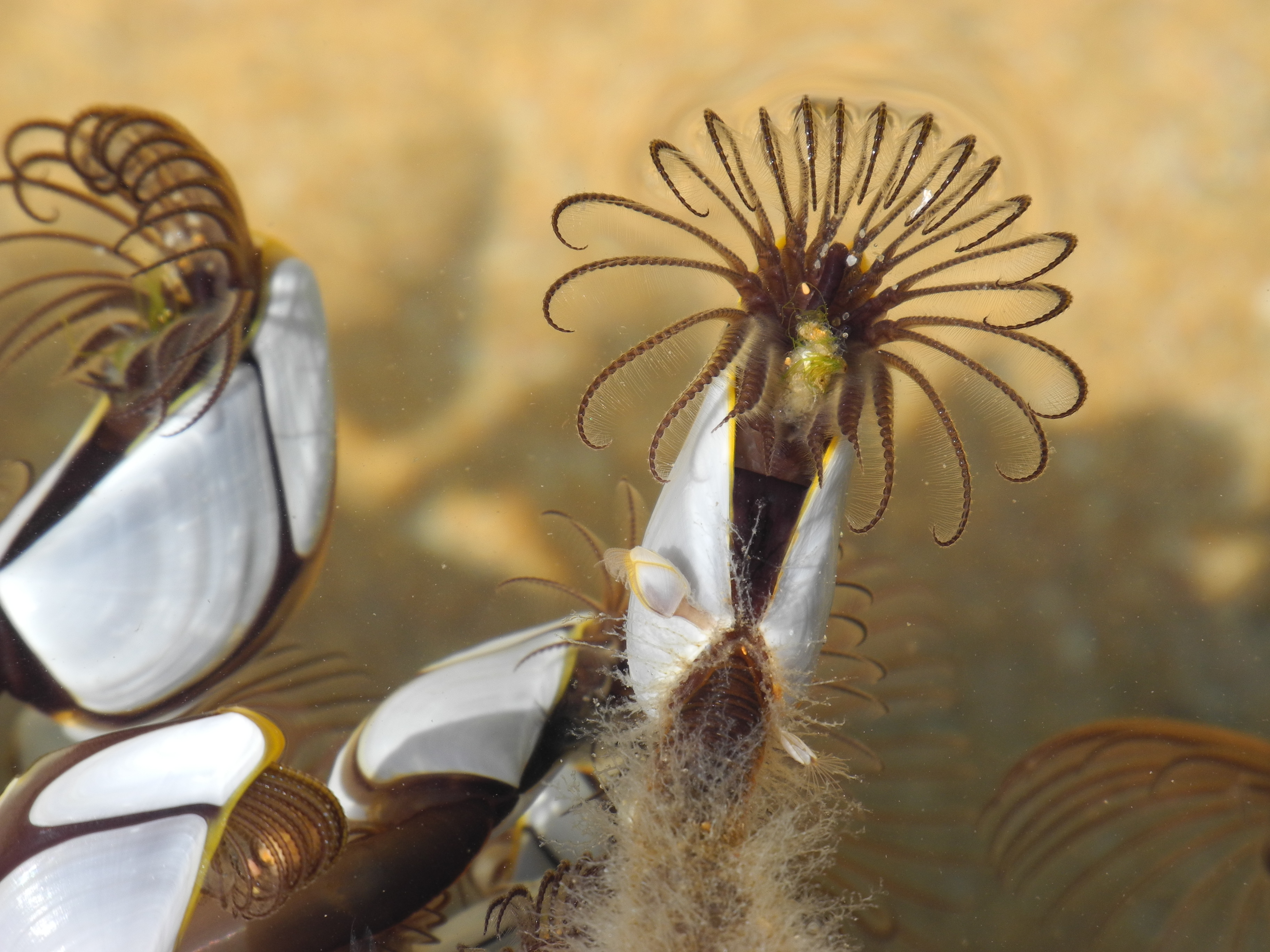
Lepas australis (Southern Goose Barnacle)

- Amphibalanus amphitrite (Darwin, 1854), Striped barnacle, (Around Australia. Also widespread overseas.)
- Amphibalanus variegatus (Darwin, 1854), Variable barnacle, (Carnarvon, Western Australia, to northern New South Wales. Also New Zealand.)
- Austrobalanus imperator (Darwin, 1854), Imperial barnacle, (New South Wales to Queensland.)
- Austromegabalanus nigrescens (Lamarck, 1818), Giant surf barnacle, (Cape Leeuwin, Western Australia, to northern New South Wales and eastern Tasmania.)
- Austrominius covertus (Foster, 1981), Estuary barnacle, (Bunbury, Western Australia, to Coffs Harbour, New South Wales, and around Tasmania.)
- Austrominius flindersi (Bayliss, 1994), Flinders' barnacle, (Ceduna to Gulf St Vincent, South Australia.)
- Austrominius modestus (Darwin, 1854), Darwin's barnacle, (Southern Western Australia to New South Wales and around Tasmania. Also New Zealand and Europe.)
- Balanus trigonus Darwin, 1854, Triangle barnacle, (Tropical Australia south to Rockingham, Western Australia, and to Victoria. Also widespread overseas.)
- Catomerus polymerus (Darwin, 1854), Surf barnacle, (Great Australian Bight, Western Australia, to Tweed Heads, New South Wales, and around Tasmania.)
- Chamaesipho tasmanica Foster & Anderson, 1986, Honeycomb barnacle, (Point Sinclair, South Australia, to Byron Bay, New South Wales, and around Tasmania.)
- Chthamalus antennatus Darwin, 1854, Eastern shore barnacle, (Discovery Bay, Victoria, to northern New South Wales and around Tasmania.)
- Epopella simplex (Darwin, 1854), Volcano barnacle, (Green Head, Western Australia, to central New South Wales and around Tasmania.)
- Hexaminius popeiana Foster, 1982, Six-plated mangrove barnacle, (Central New South Wales.)
- Ibla quadrivalvis (Cuvier, 1817), Shore stalk barnacle, (Albany, Western Australia, to central New South Wales and around Tasmania.)
- Lepas (Anatifa) australis Darwin, 1851, Southern goose barnacle, (Cottesloe, Western Australia, to New South Wales and around Tasmania. Also New Zealand and widespread in subantarctic seas.)
- Lepas (Anatifa) pectinata Spengler, 1793, Small goose barnacle, (Tropical Australia south to Cape Le Grande, Western Australia, and to central New South Wales. Also widespread overseas.)
- Smilium peronii Gray, 1825, Peron's stalk barnacle, (Houtman Abrolhos, Western Australia, to southern Queensland. Also Indonesia.)
- Tesseropora rosea (Krauss, 1848), Rosy barnacle, (Fremantle, Western Australia, and Inverloch, Victoria, to southern Queensland. Also Kermadec Island, New Caledonia and South Africa.)
- Tetraclitella purpurascens (Wood, 1815), Purple barnacle, (Kalbarri, Western Australia, to Moreton Bay, Queensland, and around Tasmania. Also New Zealand.)

==== Class Malacostraca ====
===== Order Stomatopoda =====
- Belosquilla laevis (Hess, 1865), Southern mantis shrimp, (Shark Bay, Western Australia, to Mackay, Queensland.)
- Hadrosquilla edgari Ahyong, 2001, Edgar's mantis shrimp, (Central Victoria and around Tasmania.)

===== Order Mysidacea =====
- Mysidetes halope O'Brien, 1986, Cave opossum shrimp, (Southern and eastern Tasmania)
- Paramesopodopsis rufa Fenton, 1985, Rufus opossum shrimp, (Victoria and around Tasmania)

===== Order Isopoda =====
- Euidotea bakeri (Collinge 1917), Baker's sea centipede, (Onslow, Western Australia, to Montague Island, New South Wales, and around Tasmania.)
- Ligia australiensis Dana, 1853, Australian shore slater, (Southern Western Australia to New South Wales and around Tasmania.)
- Paridotea ungulata (Pallas, 1772), Sharp-tailed sea centipede, (Spencer Gulf, South Australia, to Nadgee Reserve, New South Wales, and around Tasmania. Also New Zealand, South Africa and South America.)
- Sphaeromatidae sp. Rhinoceros isopod (Southern Tasmania.)
- Zuzara venosa (Stebbing, 1876), Digitate isopod, (South Australia to Victoria and around Tasmania.)

===== Order Amphipoda =====
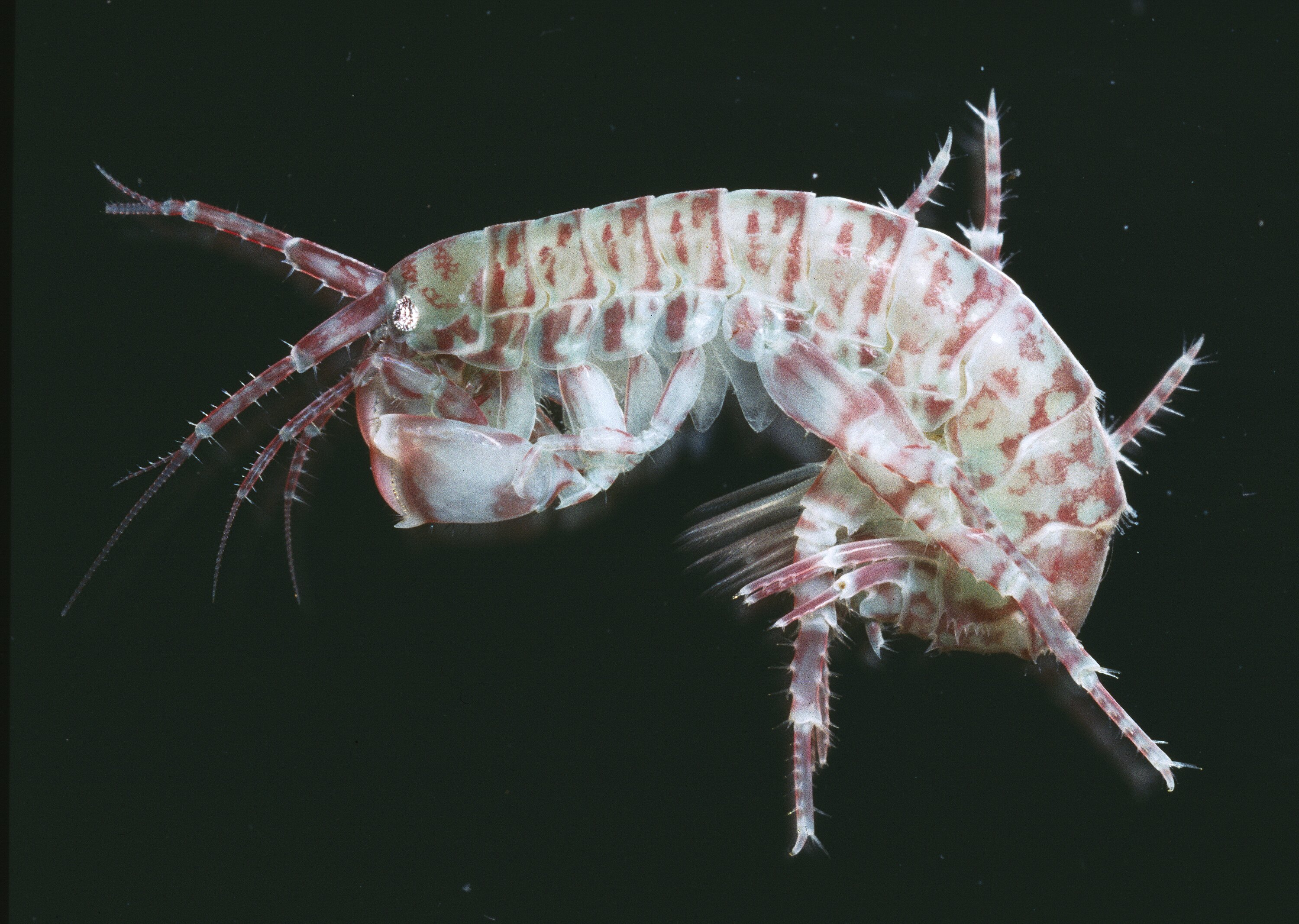
Ceradocus sellickensis

- Amaryllis philatelica Lowry and Stoddart, 2002; White-lined amphipod; (Foul Bay, Western Australia, to Solitary Islands, New South Wales, and south to Tasman Peninsula, Tasmania.)
- Caprella acanthogaster Mayer, 1990; Spine-bellied caprella; (Southeastern Tasmania. Also widespread overseas.)
- Ceradocus (Denticeradocus) serratus (Bate, 1862); Serrated amphipod; (Port Phillip Bay, Victoria, to Sydney, New South Wales, and around Tasmania.)
- Ceradocus sellickensis Sheard, 1939
- Ochlesis eridundi Barnard, 1972; Orange kelphopper; (Eastern Western Australia to central South Australia.)
- Talorchestia sp. Kelp amphipod (Victoria and around Tasmania.)
- Tethygeneia sp. Seaweed amphipod (Southeastern Tasmania.)

===== Order Euphausiacea =====
- Nyctiphanes australis Sars, 1883; Southern krill; (Great Australian Bight, South Australia, to northern New South Wales and around Tasmania. Also New Zealand.)

===== Order Decapoda =====
Family Penaeidae – Prawns, shrimps

- Metapenaeus dalli Racek, 1957; Western school prawn; (Darwin, NT, to Mandurah, Western Australia. Also Indonesia, Philippines.)
- Metapenaeus macleayi Haswell, 1870; Eastern school prawn; (Western Port, Victoria, to Tin Can Bay, Queensland.)
- Penaeus latisulcatus Kishinouye, 1896; Western king prawn; (Tropical Australia south to Gulf St Vincent, South Australia, and to Ballina, New South Wales. Also widespread in the Indo-West Pacific region.)
- Penaeus plebejus Hess, 1865; Eastern king prawn; (Port Phillip Bay, Victoria, to North Reef, Queensland, and south to Georges Bay, Tasmania.)

Family Palaemonidae – Palaemonid shrimps

- Palaemon dolospinus Walker & Poore, 2003; Estuary shrimp; (Gulf St Vincent, South Australia, to eastern Victoria and around Tasmania.)
- Palaemon intermedius (Stimpson, 1860); Red-spotted shrimp; (Perth, Western Australia, to Port Molle, Queensland, and around Tasmania)
- Palaemon serenus Heller, 1862; Rockpool shrimp; (South Australia to New South Wales and around Tasmania.)

Family Rhynchocinetidae – Hinge-back shrimps

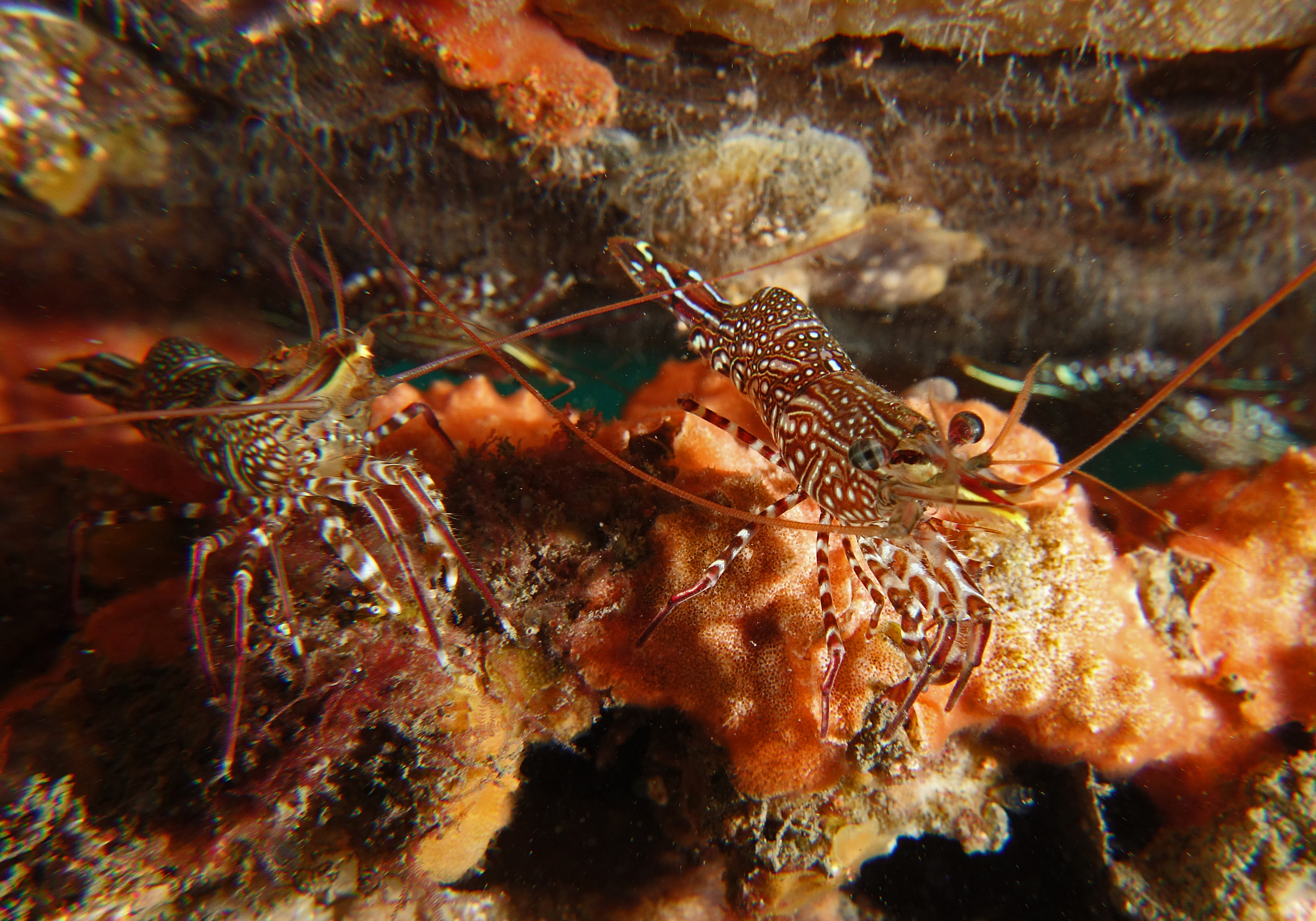
Rhynchocinetes serratus (Serrated hinge-back shrimp)

- Rhynchocinetes australis Southern hinge-back shrimp (Hale, 1941) (Esperance, Western Australia, to central Victoria and northern Tasmania.)
- Rhynchocinetes kuiteri Kuiter's hinge-back shrimp (Tiefenbacher 1983) (Portsea, Victoria.)
- Rhynchocinetes serratus Serrated hinge-back shrimp (Milne Edwards, 1837) (Southwestern Western Australia, and New South Wales.)

Family Hippolytidae – Hippolytid shrimps

- Alope orientalis Oriental reef shrimp (de Maan, 1890) (St Francis Island, South Australia, to New South Wales. Also widespread in the Indo-West Pacific region.)
- Hippolyte australiensis Australian seaweed shrimp (Stimpson 1860) (Perth, Western Australia, to southern New South Wales and around Tasmania.)
- Nauticaris marionis Marion Island shrimp (Bate, 1888) (Southern Western Australia to Victoria and around Tasmania. Also New Zealand and subantarctic islands.)
- Tozeuma elongatum Kimber's shrimp (Baker, 1904) (South Australia and Victoria.)

Family Alpheidae – Snapping shrimps, pistol shrimps

- Alpheus astrinx Orange striped pistol shrimp (Banner & Banner, 1982) (Perth, Western Australia, to Port Phillip Bay, Victoria, and around Tasmania.)
- Alpheus novaezealandiae New Zealand pistol shrimp (Miers, 1876) (Around mainland Australia and Tasmania. Also Lord Howe Island and New Zealand.)
- Alpheus richardsoni Richardson's pistol shrimp (Yaldwyn, 1971) (Western Australia to Moreton Bay, Queensland, and around Tasmania. Also New Zealand.)
- Alpheus villosus Orange hairy pistol shrimp (Miers, 1876) (Perth, Western Australia, to Eden, New South Wales, and northern Australia. Also South Africa, Philippines and Mauritius.)

Family Pandalidae – Pandalid shrimps

- Chlorotocella spinicaudus Slender shrimp (Milne Edwards, 1837) (Albany, Western Australia, to Victoria and around Tasmania.)

Family Crangonidae – Crangonid shrimps

- Philoceras victoriensis (Fulton and Grant, 1902) (Southern Western Australia to Victoria and around Tasmania)

Family Stenopodidae – Cleaner shrimps

- Stenopus hispidis Banded cleaner shrimp (Olivier, 1811) (Tropical Australia south to Rottnest Island, Western Australia, and to southern New South Wales. Also widespread in the Indo-West Pacific region.)

Family Callianassidae – Ghost shrimps, marine yabbies

- Biffarius ceramicus Ceramic ghost shrimp (Milne Edwards, 1837) (Mandurah, Western Australia, to Wilsons Promontory, Victoria, and around Tasmania.)
- Trypaea australiensis Bass yabby, ghost nipper (Dana, 1852) (Port Phillip Bay, Victoria, to Low Isles, Queensland.)

Family Laomediidae – Mangrove yabbies

- Laomedia healyi Healy's mangrove yabby (Yaldwyn & Wear, 1970) (Western Port, Victoria, to northern Queensland.)

Family Upogebiidae – Mud shrimps, upogebid shrimps

- Acutigebia simsoni Simson's mud shrimp (Thomson, 1893) (Southern, eastern and northern Australia and Tasmania.)

Family Palinuridae – Rock lobsters, spiny lobsters, crayfish, langouste

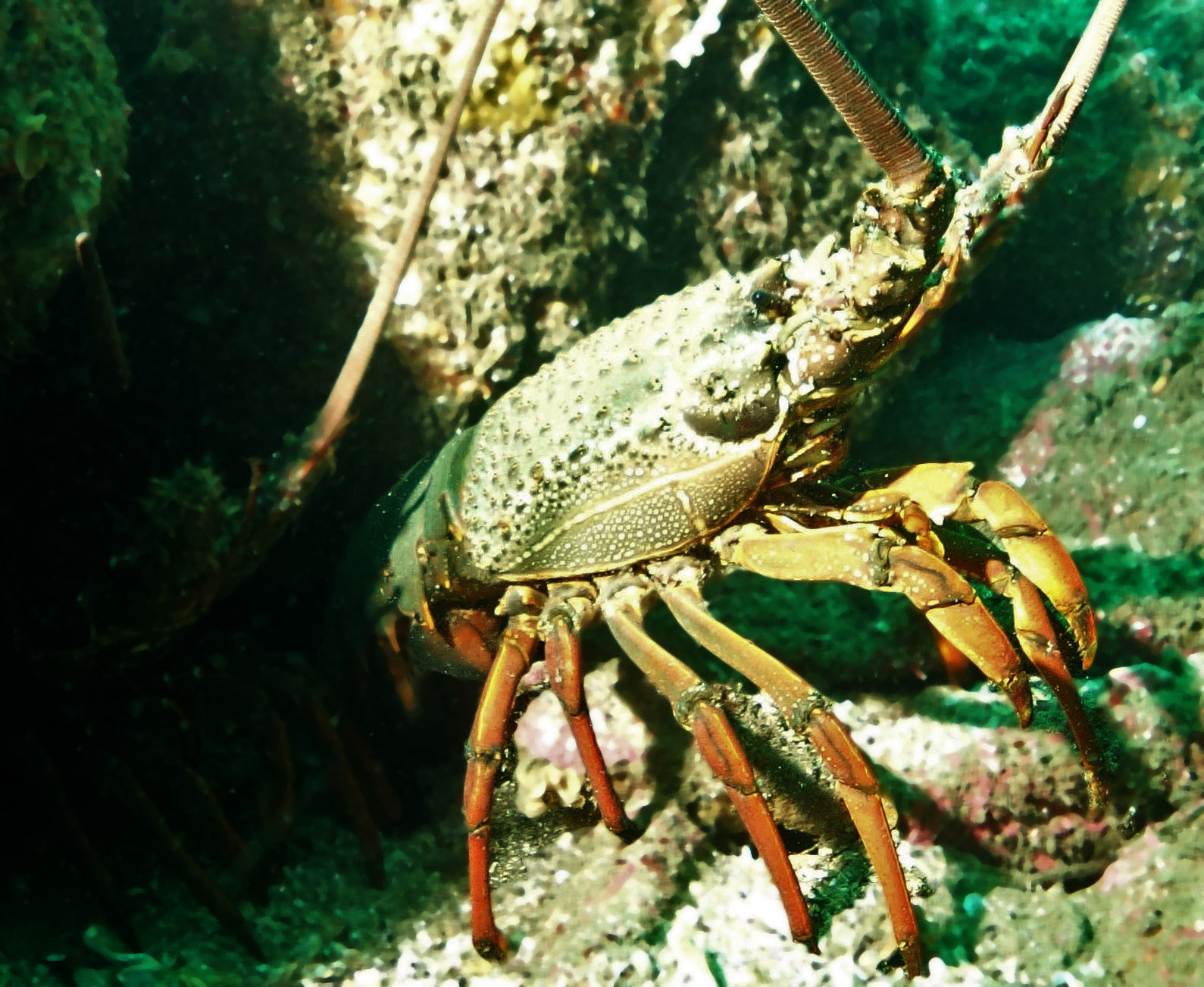
Jasus verreauxi (Eastern rock lobster)

- Jasus edwardsii Southern rock lobster, crayfish (Hutton, 1875) (Dongara, Western Australia, to Coffs Harbour, New South Wales, and around Tasmania. Also New Zealand.)
- Jasus verreauxi Eastern rock lobster (Milne Edwards, 1834) (Port MacDonnell, South Australia, to Tweed Heads, New South Wales, and northeastern Tasmania. Also New Zealand.)
- Panulirus cygnus Western rock lobster (George, 1962) (North West Cape to Cape Leeuwin, Western Australia.)

Family Scyllaridae – Shovel-nosed lobsters, slipper lobsters

- Arctides antipodarum Rough Spanish lobster (Holthuis, 1960) (Central New South Wales. Also New Zealand.)
- Crenarctus crenatus Crevice slipper lobster (Whitelegge, 1900) (Rottnest Island, Western Australia, to Queensland and around Tasmania.)
- Ibacus peronii Balmain bug (Leach, 1815) (Geraldton, Western Australia, to Newcastle, New South Wales, and around Tasmania.)

Family Diogenidae – Diogenid hermit crabs

- Paguristes brevirostris Orange-eyed hermit crab (Baker, 1905) (Port Lincoln to Adelaide, South Australia and western Tasmania.)
- Paguristes frontalis Southern hermit crab (Milne Edwards, 1836) (Cape Naturaliste, Western Australia, to Wilsons Promontory, Victoria, and Furneaux Group, Tasmania)
- Paguristes purpureantennatus Purple-antenna hermit crab (Morgan, 1987) (Geraldton to Albany, Western Australia.)
- Cancellus typus Miner hermit crab (Milne Edwards, 1836) (Cervantes, Western Australia, to Sydney, New South Wales, and around Tasmania.)
- Strigopagurus strigimanus Rasping hermit crab (White, 1847) (Port Phillip Bay, Victoria, to Newcastle, New South Wales, and around Tasmania.)

Family Paguridae – Pagurid hermit crabs

- Lophopagurus nanus Henderson's hermit crab (Henderson, 1888) (Victoria to southern Queensland and around Tasmania.)
- Pagurixus handrecki Handreck's hermit crab (Gunn & Morgan, 1992) (Rottnest Island, Western Australia, to Lakes Entrance, Victoria, and around Tasmania.)
- Pagurus sinuatus Hairy pink hermit crab (Stimpson, 1858) (Shark Bay, Western Australia, to Sydney, New South Wales.)

Family Porcellanidae – Porcelain crabs

- Petrocheles australiensis Spiny porcelain crab (Miers, 1876) (Great Australian Bight, Western Australia, to Wilsons Promontory, Victoria, and northern Tasmania.)
- Petrolistes elongatus New Zealand porcelain crab (Milne Edwards, 1840) (Eastern Tasmania. Also New Zealand.)

Family Lomisidae – Hairy stone crabs

- Lomis hirta Hairy stone crab (Lamarck, 1810) (Shark Bay, Western Australia, to Mallacoota, Victoria, and around Tasmania.)

Family Galatheidae – Squat lobsters, craylets, Lobster krill

- Galathea australiensis Australian craylet (Stimpson, 1858) (Shark Bay, Western Australia, to Port Stephens (New South Wales), and around Tasmania.)
- Munida gregaria Schooling craylet (Fabricius, 1793) (Eastern Victoria to southern New South Wales and around Tasmania. Also New Zealand and southern South America.)

Family Dromiidae – Sponge crabs

- Austrodromidia octodentata Bristled sponge crab (Haswell, 1882) (Great Australian Bight, Western Australia, to southern New South Wales.)
- Dromia wilsoni Wilson's sponge crab (Fulton & Grant, 1902) (Southern Western Australia to Port Stephens (New South Wales), and around Tasmania. Also New Zealand, Japan and South Africa.)

Family Cancridae – Edible crabs

- Metacarcinus novaezelandiae Piecrust crab (Jacquinot, 1853) (Central Victoria and eastern and southern Tasmania. Also New Zealand.)

Family Leucosiidae – Pebble crabs

- Bellidilia laevis Smooth pebble crab (Bell, 1855) (Albany, Western Australia, to Wilsons Promontory, Victoria, and around Tasmania.)
- Bellidilia undecimspinosa Large pebble crab (Kinahan, 1856) (Murray River mouth, South Australia, to Newcastle, New South Wales, and around Tasmania.)
- Ebalia intermedia Smooth nut crab (Miers, 1886) (Cottesloe, Western Australia, to southern New South Wales and around Tasmania.)
- Leucosia pubescens Granulated pebble crab (Miers, 1877) (Tropical Western Australia south to Perth. Also widespread in the Indian Ocean.)

Family Majidae – Spider crabs

- Naxia aurita Smooth seaweed crab (Latreille, 1825) (Houtman Abrolhos, Western Australia, to Western Port, Victoria, and around Tasmania.)
- Notomithrax ursus Hairy seaweed crab (Herbst, 1788) (Discovery Bay, Victoria, to New South Wales and around Tasmania.)
- Leptomithrax gaimardii Giant spider crab (Milne Edwards, 1834) (Albany, Western Australia, to Sydney, New South Wales, and around Tasmania.)
- Schizophrys aspera Red sea toad (Milne Edwards, 1834) (Tropical Australia and South Australia gulfs. Also widespread in the Indo-West Pacific region.)
- Hyastenus elatus Rhinoceros crab (Griffin & Tranter, 1986) (Tropical Australia south to Fremantle, Western Australia, and to Botany Bay, New South Wales. Also Indonesia.)

Family Hymenosomatidae

- Halicarcinus ovatus Three-pronged spider crab (Stimpson, 1858) (Geraldton, Western Australia, to Port Stephens (New South Wales), and around Tasmania.)

Family Portunidae – Swimming crabs

- Carcinus maenas Common shore crab, green crab (Linnaeus, 1758) (Swan River, Western Australia, The Coorong, South Australia, Anglesea, Victoria, to Eden, New South Wales, and eastern Tasmania. Also Europe, Brazil and North America.)
- Nectocarcinus integrifrons Seagrass swimmer crab (Latreille, 1825) (Fremantle, Western Australia, to Port Stephens (New South Wales), and around Tasmania. Also New Zealand.)
- Nectocarcinus tuberculosus Red swimmer crab, velvet crab (Milne Edwards, 1860) (Albany, Western Australia, to Sydney, New South Wales, and around Tasmania.)
- Ovalipes australiensis Surf crab (Stephenson & Rees, 1968) (Perth, Western Australia, to Wide Bay, Queensland, and around Tasmania.)
- Portunus pelagicus Blue swimmer crab, blue manna crab, sand crab (Linnaeus, 1766) (Around the Australian mainland but rare on the south coast other than the South Australia gulfs. Also widespread in the Indo-West Pacific region and the Mediterranean Sea.)
- Portunus tenuipes Pink swimmer crab (de Haan, 1833) (Tropical Australia south to Perth, Western Australia. Also widespread in the Indo-West Pacific region.)
- Scylla serrata Mud crab (Forsskål, 1775) (Tropical Australia south to Exmouth Gulf, Western Australia, and to the Bega estuary, New South Wales. Also widespread in the Indo-West Pacific region.)

Family Xanthidae – Stone crabs

- Actaea calculosa Facetted crab (H. Milne Edwards, 1834) (Around Australian mainland.)
- Actaea peronii Thorn-legged crab (H. Milne Edwards, 1834) (Southern Western Australia to southern Queensland and around Tasmania.)

Family Eriphidae – Pebble crabs

- Ozius deplanatus Eastern reef crab (White, 1847) (Eastern Victoria. to New South Wales, and Flinders Island. and Kent Group, Tasmania. Also Lord Howe Island, Norfolk Island, and New Zealand.)
- Pseudocarcinus gigas Giant crab (Milne Edwards, 1834) (Southern Western Australia to southern New South Wales and around Tasmania.)

Family Pilumnidae – Hairy shore crabs

- Heteropilumnus fimbriatus Bearded crab (Milne Edwards, 1834) (Gulf St Vincent, South Australia, to southern Queensland and around Tasmania.)
- Pilumnus monilifer Southern hairy crab (Haswell, 1881) (South Australia to Victoria and around Tasmania.)
- Pilumnus tomentosus Common hairy crab (Latreille, 1825) (Albany, Western Australia, to Newcastle, New South Wales, and around Tasmania.)

Family Goneplacidae – Goneplacid crabs

- Litocheira bispinosa Two-spined crab (Kinahan, 1856) (Albany, Western Australia, to Western Port, Victoria, and around Tasmania.)

Family Grapsidae – Shore crabs

- Brachynotus spinosus Little shore crab (Milne Edwards, 1853) (South Australia to Mallacoota, Victoria, and around Tasmania.)
- Cyclograpsus audouinii Speckled shore crab (Milne Edwards, 1837) (Shark Bay, Western Australia, to Hervey Bay, Queensland. Also New Guinea.)
- Cyclograpsus granulosus Mottled shore crab (Milne Edwards, 1853) (Kangaroo Island, South Australia, to Mallacoota, Victoria, and around Tasmania.)
- Helograpsus haswellianus Haswell's shore crab (Whitelegge, 1889) (Port River, South Australia, to Townsville, Queensland, and around Tasmania.)
- Leptograpsodes octodentatus Burrowing shore crab (Milne Edwards, 1857) (Houtman Abrolhos, Western Australia, to Cape Jervis, New South Wales, and south to Eaglehawk Neck, Tasmania.)
- Leptograpsus variegatus Swift-footed crab (Fabricius, 1793) (North West Cape, Western Australia, to Rockhampton, Queensland, and south to Bruny Island, Tasmania. Also New Zealand and South America.)
- Paragrapsus gaimardii Spotted shore crab (Milne Edwards, 1837) (Kangaroo Island, South Australia, to Narooma, New South Wales, and around Tasmania.)
- Paragrapsus laevis Estuary shore crab (Dana, 1852) (Warrnambool, Victoria, to Moreton Bay, Queensland, and south to Marion Bay, Tasmania.)
- Paragrapsus quadridentatus Notched shore crab (Milne Edwards, 1837) (Cape Marino, South Australia, to Mallacoota, Victoria, and around Tasmania.)
- Parasesarma erythrodactyla Orange-clawed shore crab (Hess, 1865) (Western Port, Victoria, to Queensland.)
- Plagusia chabrus Red bait crab, red rock crab (Linnaeus, 1758) (Rottnest Island, Western Australia, to Newcastle, New South Wales, and around Tasmania. Also New Zealand, South Africa and Chile.)

Family Ocypodidae – Ghost crabs, Stalk-eyed crabs

- Heloecius cordiformis Semaphore crab (Milne Edwards, 1837) (Port Phillip Bay, Victoria, to Brisbane, Queensland, and eastern Tasmania.)
- Macrophthalmus latifrons Southern sentinel crab (Haswell, 1882) (Gulf St Vincent, South Australia, to Wilsons Promontory, Victoria, and eastern Tasmania.)
- Ocypode cordimanus Ghost crab (Desmarest, 1825) (Tropical Australia south to Kimberley, Western Australia, and to Sydney, New South Wales.)

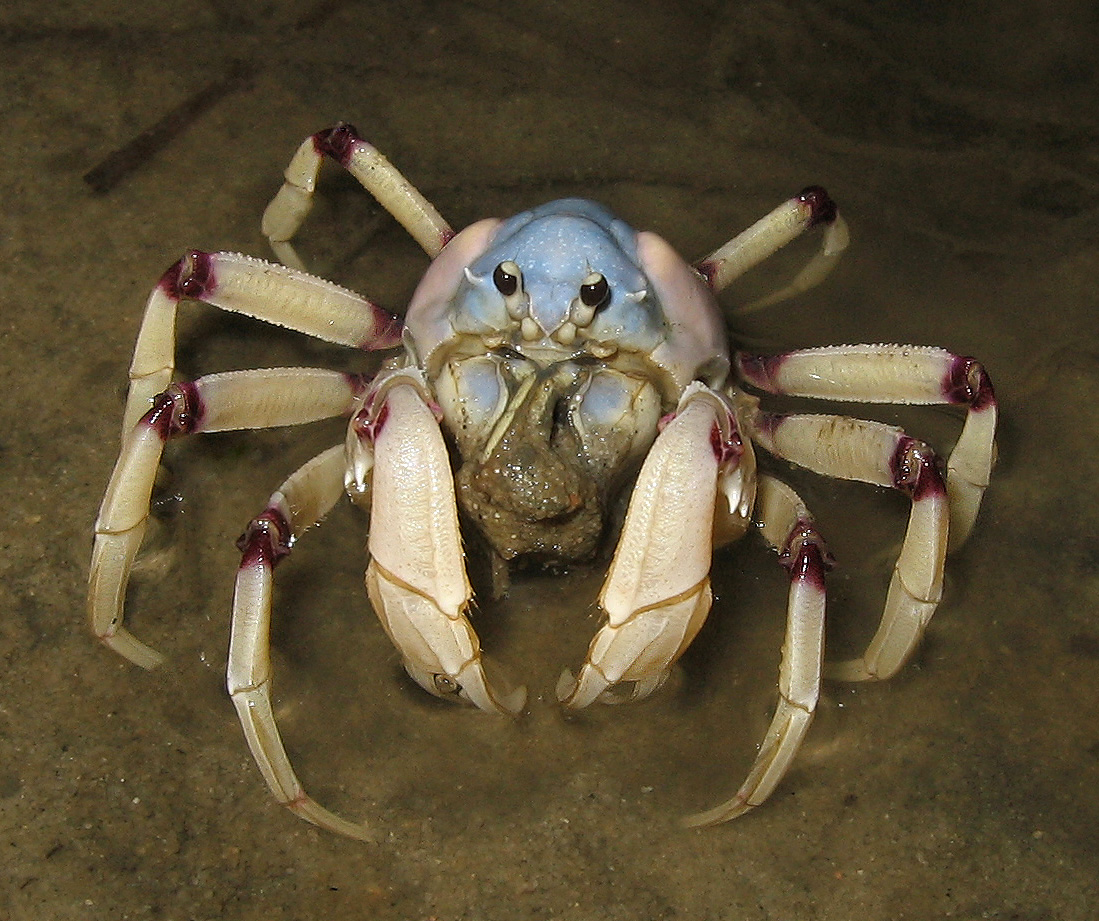
Mictyris longicarpus (Soldier crab)

Family Mictyridae – Soldier crabs

- Mictyris longicarpus Banded soldier crab (Latreille, 1806) (Tropical Australia south to Perth, Western Australia, and to Wilsons Promontory, Victoria.)
- Mictyris platycheles Southern soldier crab (Milne Edwards, 1852) (Port Phillip Bay, Victoria, to Moreton Bay, Queensland, and around Tasmania.)

Family Pinnotheridae – pea crabs

- Pinnotheres hickmani Hickman's pea crab (Guiler, 1950) (Shark Bay, Western Australia, to Moreton Bay, Queensland, and around Tasmania.)

== Phylum Mollusca ==
=== Class Aplacophora ===
- Falcidens poias Strapweed aplacophoran (Scheltema, 1995) (Rottnest Island, Western Australia.)

=== Class Polyplacophora ===
Family Ischnochitonidae

- ??Ashby, 1918 Wireweed chiton (Dongara, Western Australia, to eastern Victoria and northern Tasmania.)
- Callistochiton antiquus Antique chiton (Reeve, 1847) (Cape Naturaliste, Western Australia, to Cooktown, Queensland, and northern Tasmania.)
- Callochiton crocinus Red-marked chiton (Reeve, 1847) (Southern Western Australia to southern Queensland and around Tasmania. Also New Zealand.)
- Eudoxoplax inornata Giant southern chiton (Tenison Woods, 1881) (South Australia and Victoria and around Tasmania.)
- Ischnochiton australis Southern chiton (Blainville, 1825) (Great Australian Bight, South Australia, to southern Queensland and around Tasmania.)
- Ischnochiton cariosus Beaded chiton (Pilsbry, 1892) (Albany, Western Australia, to northern New South Wales and around Tasmania.)
- Ischnochiton contractus Granular chiton (Reeve, 1847) (Dampier, Western Australia, to Port Phillip Bay, Victoria, and the Furneaux Group, Tasmania.)
- Ischnochiton elongatus Elongate chiton (Blainville, 1825) (Shark Bay, Western Australia, to New South Wales and around Tasmania.)
- Ischnochiton lineolatus Lined chiton (Sowerby, 1840) (Normalup, Western Australia, to Burleigh Heads, Queensland, and around Tasmania.)
- Ischnochiton torri Torr's chiton (Iredale & May 1916) (Southern Western Australia to Cape Patterson, Victoria, and northern Tasmania.)
- Ischnochiton variegatus Variable chiton (H. Adams & Angas, 1864) (Esperance, Western Australia, to Mallacoota, Victoria, and northern and eastern Tasmania.)

Family Mopaliidae

- Plaxiphora albida Giant chiton (Blainville, 1825) (Southern Western Australia to southern Queensland and around Tasmania.)

Family Schizochitonidae

- Lorica volvox Sculptured chiton (Reeve, 1847) (Southern Western Australia to New South Wales and around Tasmania.)

Family Chitonidae

- Acanthopleura gaimardi Gaimard's shore chiton (Blainville, 1825) (New South Wales to southern Queensland.)
- Acanthopleura hirtosa Hairy shore chiton (Blainville, 1825) (Shark Bay to Albany, Western Australia.)
- Chiton glaucus New Zealand green chiton (Gray, 1828) (Southeastern Tasmania. Also New Zealand.)
- Onithochiton quercinus Eyed chiton (Gould, 1846) (Houtman Abrolhos to Esperance, Western Australia, and southern New South Wales to Mackay, Queensland.)
- Rhyssoplax calliozona Patterned chiton (Pilsbry, 1894) (Esperance, Western Australia, to Victoria and Tasmania.)
- Rhyssoplax jugosa Elevated chiton (Gould, 1846) (Point Hicks, Victoria, to northern New South Wales.)
- Rhyssoplax translucens Translucent chiton (Hedley & Hull, 1909) (Central New South Wales.)
- Rhyssoplax tricostalis Three-ribbed chiton (Pilsbry, 1894) (Southern Western Australia to eastern Victoria and around Tasmania.)
- Sypharochiton pelliserpentis Serpent-skin chiton (Quoy & Gaimard, 1836) (Cape Conran, Victoria, to central New South Wales and eastern Tasmania. Also New Zealand.)

Family Acanthochitonidae

- Cryptoplax mystica Wide-girdled worm chiton (Iredale & Hull, 1825) (New South Wales.)
- Cryptoplax striata Mottled worm chiton (Lamarck, 1819) (Southern Western Australia to Cape Paterson, Victoria, and around Tasmania.)

=== Class Gastropoda ===
==== Subclass Prosobranchia ====
Family Haliotidae – Abalone, earshells

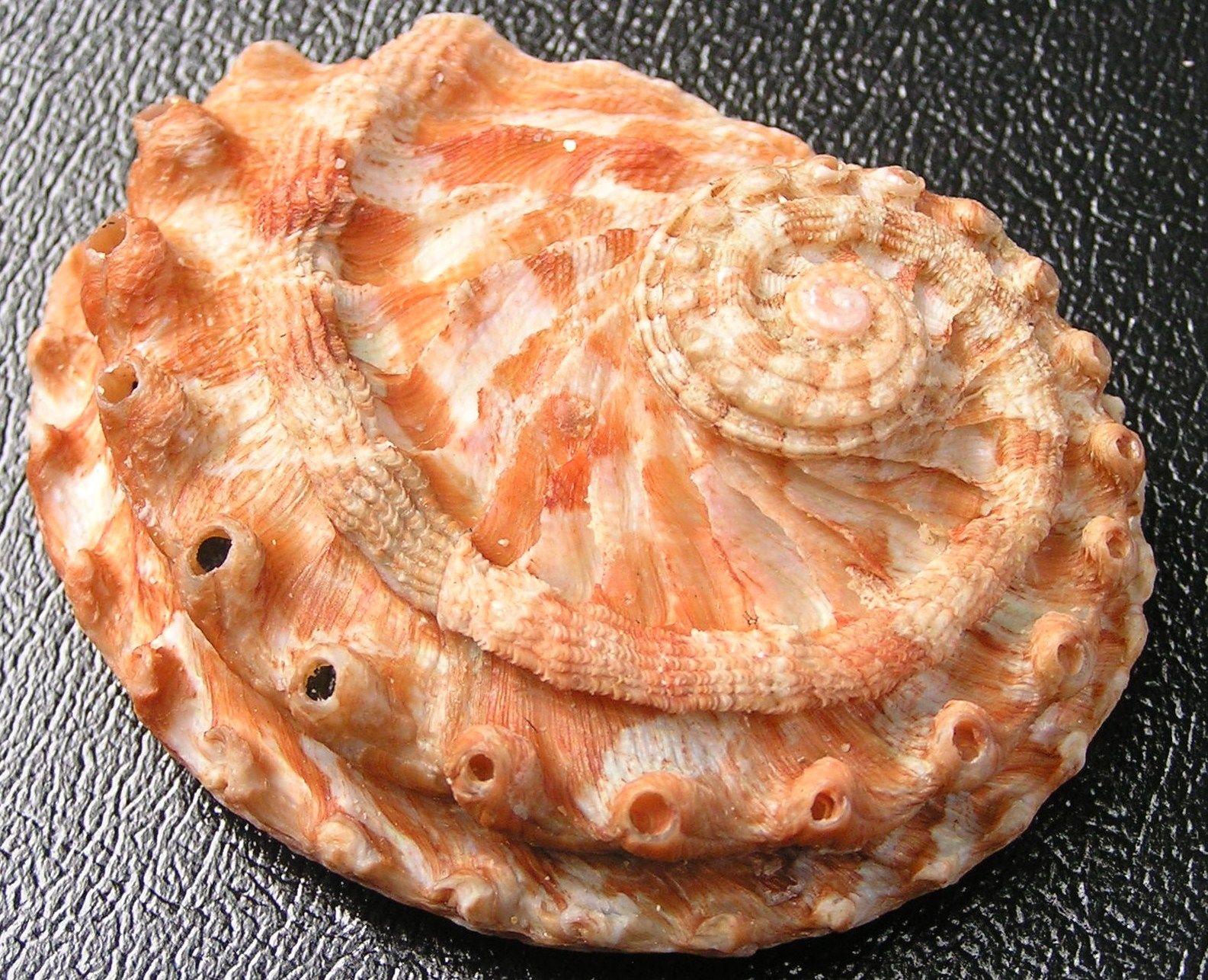
Haliotis scalaris (Grooved abalone)

- Haliotis coccoradiata Elongate abalone (Reeve, 1846) (Mallacoota, Victoria, to Moreton Bay, Queensland.)
- Haliotis cyclobates Circular abalone (Peron, 1816) (Recherche Archipelago, Western Australia, to western Victoria.)
- Haliotis elegans Elegant abalone (Phillipi, 1874) (Jurien Bay to Esperance, Western Australia.)
- Haliotis laevigata Greenlip abalone (Donovan, 1808) (Cape Naturaliste, Western Australia, to Cape Liptrap, Victoria, and northern Tasmania.)
- Haliotis roei Roe's abalone (Gray, 1827) (Shark Bay, Western Australia, to western Victoria.)
- Haliotis rubra Blacklip abalone (Leach, 1814) (Fremantle, Western Australia, to Angourie, New South Wales, and around Tasmania.)
- Haliotis scalaris Grooved abalone (Leach, 1814) (Dongara, Western Australia, to Cape Liptrap, Victoria, and northern Tasmania.)
- Haliotis semiplicata Menke's abalone (Menke, 1843) (Jurien Bay, Western Australia, to Point Sinclair, South Australia.)

Family Fissurellidae – Keyhole limpets, slit limpets

- Amblychilepas javanicensis Patterned keyhole limpet (Lamarck, 1822) (Houtman Abrolhos, Western Australia, to Sydney, New South Wales, and around Tasmania.)
- Amblychilepas nigrita Cream keyhole limpet (Sowerby, 1834) (Geraldton, Western Australia, to Caloundra, Queensland, and around Tasmania.)
- Amblychilepas oblonga Oblong keyhole limpet (Menke, 1843) (Geraldton, Western Australia, to Western Port, Victoria.)
- Clypidina rugosa Rugose slit limpet (Quoy & Gaimard, 1834) (Southern Western Australia to New South Wales and around Tasmania.)
- Diodora lineata Raised keyhole limpet (Sowerby, 1835) (Port Phillip Bay, Victoria, to southern Queensland.)
- Macroschisma tasmaniae Tasmanian keyhole limpet (Sowerby, 1866) (South Australia to Green Cape, New South Wales, and around Tasmania.)
- Tugali cicatricosa Flat-notched limpet (A. Adams, 1852) (Carnarvon, Western Australia, to Victoria and around Tasmania.)
- Scutus antipodes Elephant snail, duckbill (Montfort, 1810) (Geraldton, Western Australia, to Bowen, Queensland, and around Tasmania. Also New Zealand.)

Family Patellidae – Patellids, true limpets

- Scutellastra chapmani Star limpet (Tenison Woods, 1876) (Dongara, Western Australia, to northern New South Wales and around Tasmania.)
- Scutellastra laticostata Giant western limpet (Blainville, 1825) (Shark Bay, Western Australia, to Port Lincoln, South Australia, and reported from several Bass Strait islands, Tasmania.)
- Scutellastra peronii Peron's limpet (Blainville, 1825) (Shark Bay, Western Australia, to New South Wales and around Tasmania.)

Family Nacellidae – Nacellid limpets

- Cellana solida Orange-edged limpet (Blainville, 1825) (Great Australian Bight, South Australia, to southern Queensland and around Tasmania.)
- Cellana tramoserica Variegated limpet (Holten, 1802) (Great Australian Bight, Western Australia, to Burnett Heads, Queensland, and northeastern Tasmania.)

Family Lottiidae – Owl limpets, lottiid limpets

- Notoacmea flammea Flamed limpet (Quoy & Gaimard, 1834) (Fremantle, Western Australia, to Sydney, New South Wales, and around Tasmania.)
- Notoacmea mayi May's limpet (May 1923) (Eastern South Australia to Cape Liptrap, Victoria, and around Tasmania.)
- Notoacmea petterdi Petterd's limpet (Tenison Woods, 1876) (Eastern South Australia to Noosa, Queensland, and around Tasmania.)
- Patelloida alticostata Ribbed limpet (Angas, 1865) (Kalbarri, Western Australia, to the Entrance, New South Wales, and around Tasmania.)
- Patelloida insignis Maltese Cross limpet (Menke, 1843) (Geraldton, Western Australia, to central Victoria and around Tasmania.)
- Pied limpet Patelloida latistrigata (Angas, 1865) (Eyre Peninsula, South Australia, to Coolangatta, Queensland, and around Tasmania.)
- Patelloida mimula Oyster limpet (Iredale, 1924) (Tropical Australia south to Shark Bay, Western Australia, and to Lakes Entrance, Victoria.)
- Patelloida victoriana Victorian limpet (Singleton, 1937) (Spencer Gulf, South Australia, to Wilsons Promontory, Victoria, and around Tasmania.)

Family Trochidae – Top shells

- Astralium aureum Golden star shell (Jonas, 1844) (Cape Naturaliste, Western Australia, to southern New South Wales and around Tasmania.)
- Astralium squamiferum Seagrass star (Koch, 1844) (Port Gregory, Western Australia, to Angourie, New South Wales, and northern Tasmania.)
- Astralium tentoriiformis Tent shell (Jonas, 1845) (Eastern Victoria to Mackay, Queensland.)
- Austrocochlea brevis Tasmanian winkle (Parsons & Ward, 1994) (Around Tasmania.)
- Austrocochlea concamerata Pied winkle (Wood, 1828) (Houtman Abrolhos, Western Australia, to Port Stephens (New South Wales), and around Tasmania.)
- Austrocochlea constricta Ribbed winkle (Lamarck, 1822) (Albany, Western Australia, to Coffs Harbour, New South Wales, and around Tasmania.)
- Austrocochlea porcata Zebra winkle (Adams, 1851) (Geraldton, Western Australia, to Townsville, Queensland, and northern and eastern Tasmania.)
- Bankivia fasciata Necklace shell (Menke, 1830) (South Australia to Tweed Heads, New South Wales, and around Tasmania.)
- Calliostoma armillatum Pink top shell (Wood, 1828) (Fremantle, Western Australia, to New South Wales and around Tasmania.)
- Calthalotia fragum Spotted strawberry top shell (Phillipi, 1848) (Eastern Victoria to central Queensland.)
- Chlorodiloma odontis Chequered winkle (Wood, 1828) (South Australia to Cape Liptrap, Victoria, and around Tasmania.)
- Clanculus flagellatus Flamed top shell (Phillipi, 1848) (Fremantle, Western Australia, to Victoria and around Tasmania.)
- Clanculus undatus Wavy top shell (Lamarck, 1816) (Cape Naturaliste, Western Australia, to Bega, New South Wales, and around Tasmania.)
- Granata imbricata False ear shell (Lamarck, 1816) (Geraldton, Western Australia, to Wilsons Promontory, Victoria, and northern Tasmania.)
- Lunella torquata Turban shell (Gmelin, 1791) syn. Turbo torquatus ((as T. torquatus)Port Gregory, Western Australia, to eastern South Australia, and from Green Cape to Brunswick Heads, New South Wales.)
- Phasianella australis Pheasant shell, painted lady (Gmelin, 1788) (Geraldton, Western Australia, to Wilsons Promontory, Victoria, and around Tasmania.)
- Phasianella ventricosa Swollen pheasant shell (Swainson, 1822) (Houtman Abrolhos, Western Australia, to Noosa, Queensland, and around Tasmania.)
- Phasianotrochus eximius Giant kelp shell (Perry, 1811) (Dongara, Western Australia, to New South Wales and around Tasmania.)
- Phasianotrochus irisodontes Kelp shell, maireener (Quoy & Gaimard, 1834) (Geraldton, Western Australia, to Cape Liptrap, Victoria, and around Tasmania.)
- Phasianotrochus rutilus Wavy kelp shell (Adams, 1851) (Southern Western Australia to Victoria and around Tasmania.)
- Prothalotia lehmani Lehman's top shell (Menke, 1843) (Kalbarri, Western Australia, to Victoria.)
- Stomatella impertusa Elongate false ear shell (Burrow, 1815) (Southern Western Australia to Sydney, New South Wales, and around Tasmania.)
- Strigosella lepida Seagrass top shell (Wood, 1828) (North West Cape to Esperance, Western Australia.)
- Thalotia conica Conical top shell (Gray, 1827) (Geraldton, Western Australia, to Wilsons Promontory, Victoria, and south to Triabunna, Tasmania.)
- Turbo jourdani Jourdan's turban shell (Kiener, 1839) (Geraldton, Western Australia, to central South Australia.)
- Turbo pulcher Western turban (Reeve, 1842) (Point Quobba to Esperance, Western Australia.)
- Turbo undulatus Warrener, periwinkle (Lightfoot, 1786) (Hopetoun, Western Australia, to Coolangatta, Queensland, and around Tasmania.)

Family Neritidae – Nerites

- Nerita atramentosa Western black crow (Reeve, 1855) (North West Cape, Western Australia, to southern New South Wales and around Tasmania.)
- Nerita melanotragus Eastern black crow (Smith, 1884) (Central Victoria to Yeppoon, Queensland, and around Tasmania. Also Lord Howe Island and New Zealand.)

Family Littorinidae – Periwinkles

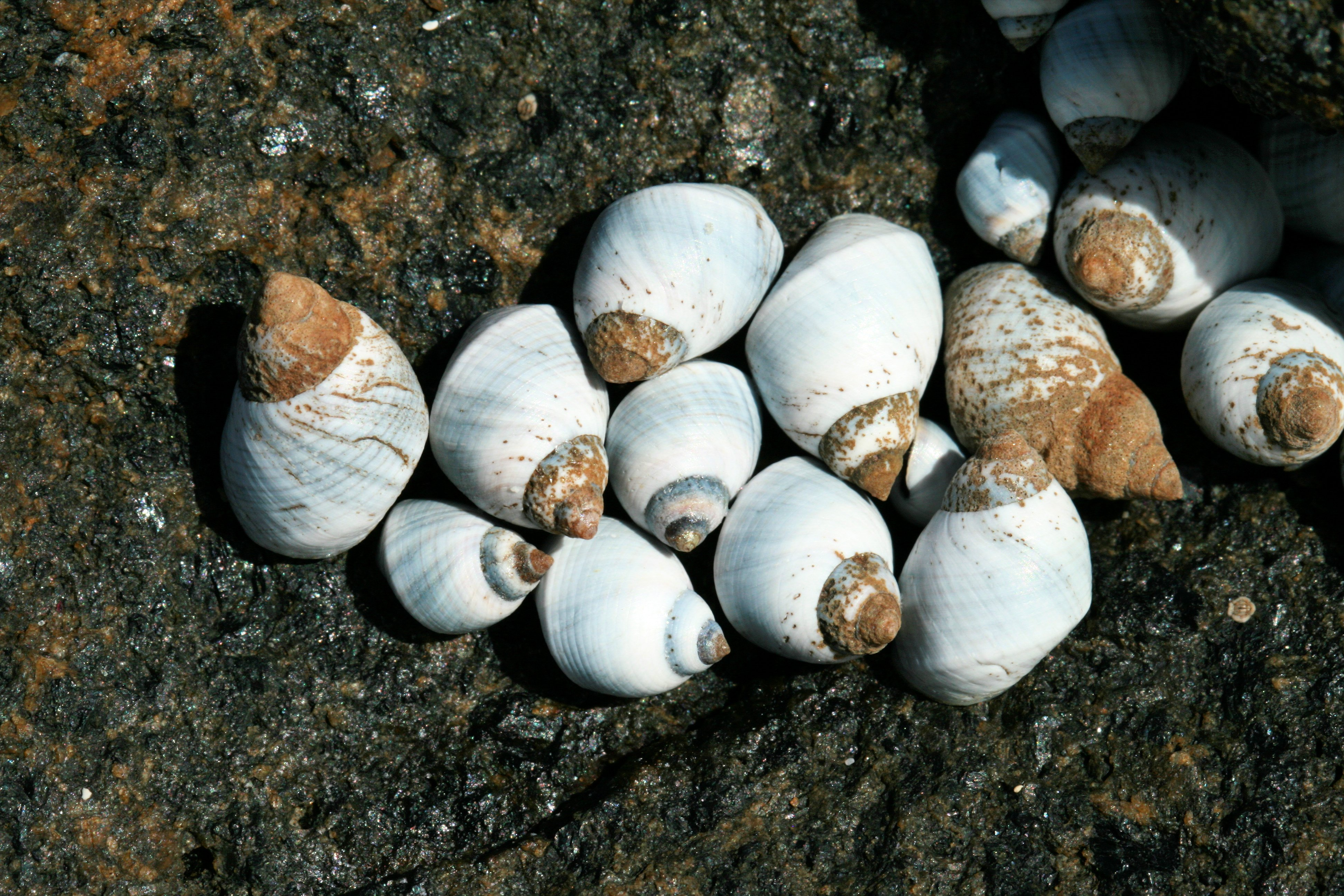
Austrolittorina unifasciata (Blue periwinkle)

- Afrolittorina praetermissa Grey periwinkle (May 1908) (Cowaramup, Western Australia, to Lake Burrill, New South Wales, and around Tasmania.)
- Austrolittorina unifasciata Blue periwinkle (Gray, 1826) (North West Cape, Western Australia, to Yeppoon, Queensland, and around Tasmania.)
- Bembicium auratum Dark-mouth conniwink (Quoy & Gaimard, 1834) (Port Lincoln, South Australia, to Yeppoon, Queensland, and around Tasmania.)
- Bembicium melanostoma Gold-mouth conniwink (Gmelin 1791) (Port Phillip and Western Port, Victoria, and around Tasmania.)
- Bembicium nanum Striped conniwink (Lamarck, 1822) (Port Lincoln, South Australia, to Yeppoon, Queensland, and around Tasmania.)
- Echinolittorina australis Southern periwinkle (Quoy & Gaimard, 1826) (Kimberley to Esperance, Western Australia.)
- Littoraria luteola Mangrove periwinkle (Quoy & Gaimard, 1833) (Merimbula, New South Wales, to Torres Strait, Queensland.)
- Nodilittorina pyramidalis Nodular periwinkle (Quoy & Gaimard, 1833) (Mallacoota, Victoria, to Yeppoon, Queensland. Also Lord Howe Island and Norfolk Island.)

Family Turritellidae – Screw shells

- Maoricolpus roseus New Zealand screw shell (Quoy & Gaimard, 1834) (Eastern Tasmania to southern New South Wales. Also New Zealand.)

Family Siliquariidae – Slit worm shells

- Pyrazus ebeninus Hercules club whelk (Brugiere, 1792) (Lakes Entrance, Victoria, to Port Curtis, Queensland.)
- Tenagodus australis Southern slit worm shell (Quoy & Gaimard, 1834) (Geraldton, Western Australia, to northern New South Wales, and northern Tasmania.)

Family Batillaridae – Mudwhelks

- Batillaria australis Southern mudwhelk (Quoy & Gaimard, 1834) (Perth, Western Australia, to southern Queensland and northern Tasmania.)

Family Cerithiidae – Ceriths, creepers

- Rhinoclavis bituberculata Western creeper (Sowerby, 1865) (Tropical Australia south to Cape Leeuwin, Western Australia, and southern Queensland.)

Family Campanilidae – Lighthouse shells

- Campanile symbolicum Giant creeper (Iredale, 1917) (Geraldton to Esperance, Western Australia.)

Family Vermetidae – Worm shells

- Serpulorbis sipho Worm shell (Lamarck, 1818) (Around Australian mainland and Tasmania. Also widespread in the Indo-West Pacific region.)

Family Hipponicidae – Bonnet limpets

- Hipponix conicus Bonnet limpet (Schumacher, 1817) (Around Australian mainland and Tasmania. Also widespread in the Indo-West Pacific region.)

Family Janthinidae – Violet snails

- Janthina janthina Violet snail (Linnaeus, 1758) (Western Australia to Queensland and eastern Tasmania. Widespread overseas.)

Family Naticidae – Moon snails

- Polinices conicus Moon shell, sand snail (Lamarck, 1822) (Around Australia and Tasmania.)

Family Velutinidae – Velvet snails

- Lamellaria australis Southern lamellaria (Basedow, 1905) (Southern Western Australia to Victoria.)

Family Cypraeidae – Cowries

- Austrocypraea reevei Reeve's cowry (Sowerby, 1832) (Houtman Abrolhos, Western Australia, to Victor Harbor, South Australia.)
- Cypraea fallax Western spotted cowry (Smith, 1881) (Denmark to Cape Naturaliste, Western Australia.)
- Notocypraea angustata Southern cowry (Gmelin, 1791) (Streaky Bay, South Australia, to Eden, New South Wales, and around Tasmania.)
- Notocypraea comptoni Compton's cowry (Gray, 1847) (Cape Leeuwin, Western Australia, to southern New South Wales and around Tasmania.)
- Notocypraea declivis Speckled cowry (Sowerby, 1870) (Cape Jaffa, South Australia, to Victoria and around Tasmania.)
- Umbilia armeniaca Armenian cowry (Verco, 1912) (Rottnest Island, Western Australia, to Investigator Strait, South Australia.)
- Umbilia hesitata Wonder cowry (Iredale, 1916) (Cape Jaffa, South Australia, to Fraser Island, Queensland, and Tasmania.)
- Zoila friendii Black cowry (Gray, 1831) (Port Maud, Western Australia, to Apollo Bay, Victoria, and northwestern Tasmania.)
- Zoila marginata Margin cowry (Gaskoin, 1848) (Gnaraloo, Western Australia, to Victor Harbor, South Australia.)
- Zoila rosselli Rossell's cowry (Cotton, 1948) (Gnaraloo, Western Australia, to Cape Adieu, South Australia.)
- Zoila venustaMuch desired cowry (Smith, 1880) (Shark Bay, Western Australia, to Cape Adieu, Great Australian Bight, South Australia.)

Family Ovulidae – Spindle cowries, egg cowries

- Phenacovolva philippinarum Giant spindle cowry (Sowerby, 1848) (Tropical Australia south to Esperance, Western Australia, and to central Queensland. Also widespread in the Indo-West Pacific region.)
- Prosimnia semperi Semper's spindle cowry (Weinkauff, 1881) (Tropical Australia south to Cape Leeuwin, Western Australia, and to Merimbula, New South Wales. Also widespread in the Indo-West Pacific region.)

Family Cassidae – Helmet shells

- Cassis fimbriata Fimbriate helmet (Quoy & Gaimard, 1833) (Abrolhos, Western Australia, to western Victoria.)
- Semicassis pyrum Pear helmet (Lamarck, 1822) (Fremantle, Western Australia, to New South Wales and around Tasmania. Also New Zealand and South Africa.)
- Semicassis semigranosum Half-grained helmet (Lamarck, 1822) (Fremantle, Western Australia, to Portsea, Victoria, and around Tasmania.)
- Semicassis sinuosum Blotched helmet (Verco, 1904) (Bunbury, Western Australia, to Backstairs Passage, South Australia.)

Family Ranellidae Tritons, trumpet shells

- Argobuccinum pustulosum Swollen triton (Lightfoot, 1786) (Eastern South Australia to central Victoria and around Tasmania. Also New Zealand, South Africa and South America.)
- Charonia lampas Red triton (Linnaeus, 1758) (Jurien Bay, Western Australia, to Swain Reefs, Queensland, and around Tasmania. Also New Zealand, South Africa, Japan and Europe.)
- Cabestana spengleri Spengler's triton (Perry, 1811) (Western South Australia to southern Queensland and around Tasmania.)
- Cabestana tabulata Fringed triton (Menke, 1843) (Fremantle, Western Australia, to New South Wales and around Tasmania. Also New Zealand.)
- Cymatium parthenopeum Giant hairy triton, oyster drill (von Salis, 1793) (Lancelin, Western Australia, to southern Queensland and northern Tasmania.)
- Ranella australasia Australian hairy triton, southern rock whelk (Perry, 1811) (Houtman Abrolhos, Western Australia, to Tin Can Bay, Queensland, and around Tasmania.)
- Sassia verrucosa Creamy rock whelk (Reeve, 1844) (Southern Western Australia to southern New South Wales and around Tasmania.)

Family Muricidae – Murex shells

- Dicathais orbita Cartrut shell (Gmelin, 1791) (Barrow Island, Western Australia, to southern Queensland and around Tasmania. Also New Zealand.)
- Agnewia tritoniformis Triton rock shell (Blainville, 1832) (Port Fairy, Victoria, to central New South Wales and around Tasmania. Also New Zealand.)
- Lepsiella vinosa Veined rock shell (Lamarck, 1822) (Cockburn Sound, Western Australia, to Victoria and around Tasmania.)
- Pterynotus triformis Fluted murex (Reeve, 1845) (Busselton, Western Australia, to southern New South Wales and around Tasmania.)
- Pterynotus undosus Undulating murex (Vokes, 1993) (Perth to Eucla, Western Australia.)
- Chicoreus denudatus Southern murex (Perry, 1811) (South Australia to New South Wales and northern Tasmania.)
- Morula marginalba Mulberry whelk (Blainville, 1832) (Merimbula, New South Wales, to Queensland.)

Family Turbinellidae – Vase and Pagoda shells

- Vasum flindersi Flinders vase shell (Verco, 1914) (Jurien Bay, Western Australia, to Backstairs Passage, South Australia.)

Family Fasciolariidae – Tulip shells, spindle shells

- Fusinus australis Southern spindle (Perry, 1811) (Geraldton, Western Australia, to Lakes Entrance, Victoria.)
- Fusinus novaehollandiae New Holland spindle (Reeve, 1848) (Great Australian Bight, South Australia, to Cape Moreton, Queensland, and around Tasmania.)
- Pleuroploca australasia Tulip shell (Perry, 1811) syn. (Perry, 1811) ((as P. australasia)Esperance, Western Australia, to southern New South Wales and around Tasmania.)

Family Buccinidae – Whelks

- Cominella eburnea Ribbed cominella (Reeve, 1846) (Geraldton, Western Australia, to Moreton Bay, Queensland, and around Tasmania.)
- Cominella lineolata Lined cominella (Lamarck, 1809) (Hopetoun, Western Australia, to Jervis Bay, New South Wales, and around Tasmania.)
- Cominella torri Torr's whelk (Verco, 1909) (Albany, Western Australia, to St Francis Island, South Australia.)
- Penion mandarinus Mandarin whelk (Duclos, 1831) (Esperance, Western Australia, to Trial Bay, New South Wales, and around Tasmania.)
- Penion maximus Giant whelk (Tryon, 1881) (Wilsons Promontory, Victoria, to Caloundra, Queensland, and around Tasmania.)

Family Columbellidae – Dove shells

- Euplica bidentata Seagrass dove shell (Menke, KT, 1843) (North West Cape, Western Australia, to South Australia.)
- Mitrella austrini Cryptic dove shell (Gaskoin, 1851) (Fremantle, Western Australia, to southern New South Wales and around Tasmania.)

Family Nassariidae – Dog whelks

- Nassarius particeps Reticulate dog whelk (Hedley, 1915) (Port Hedland, Western Australia, to Proserpine, Queensland.)
- Nassarius pauperatus Impoverished dog whelk (Lamarck, 1822) (Geraldton, Western Australia, to Sydney, New South Wales, and around Tasmania.)

Family Conidae – Cone shells

- Conus anemone Anemone cone (Lamarck, 1810) (Port Gregory, Western Australia, to southern Queensland and around Tasmania.)
- Conus dorreensis Pontifical cone (Peron, 1807) (Monte Bello Islands to Albany, Western Australia.)

Family Mitridae – Mitres

- Mitra glabra Black mitre (Swainson, 1821) (Fremantle, Western Australia, to Port Macquarie, New South Wales, and around Tasmania.)
- Mitra chalybeia Lined mitre (Reeve, 1844) (Shark Bay to Alexander Bay, Western Australia.)

Family Volutomitridae

- Waimatea obscura Obscure mitre (Hutton, 1873) (Cape Liptrap, Western Australia, to South Australia and around Tasmania. Also New Zealand.)

Family Volutidae – Volutes

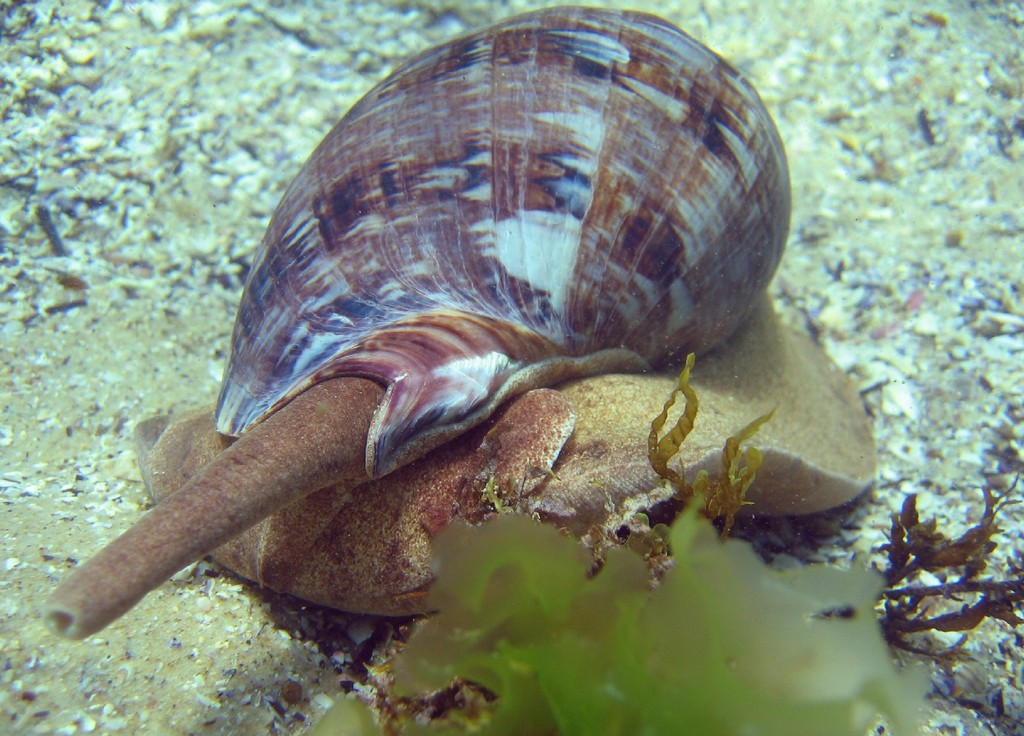
Cymbiola magnifica (Magnificent volute)

- Amoria damoni Damon's volute (Gray, 1864) (Cooktown, Queensland, to Cape Leeuwin, Western Australia.)
- Amoria exoptanda Much desired volute (Reeve, 1849) (Cape Naturaliste, Western Australia, to Victor Harbor, South Australia.)
- Amoria undulata Wavy volute (Lamarck, 1804) (Dampier, Western Australia, to Cape Moreton, Queensland, and around Tasmania.)
- Cymbiola magnifica Magnificent volute (Shaw & Nodder, 1808) (Mallacoota, Victoria, to Capricorn Group, Queensland.)
- Cymbiola nivosa Snowy volute (Lamarck, 1804) (Kimberley to Fremantle, Western Australia.)
- Ericusa fulgetra Lightning volute (Sowerby, 1825) (Recherche Archipelago, Western Australia, to eastern South Australia.)
- Lyria mitraeformis Mitre-shaped volute (Lamarck, 1811) (Cape Leeuwin, Western Australia, to eastern Bass Strait, Victoria, and northern Tasmania.)
- Melo miltonis Southern bailer (Gray, 1834) (Houtman Abrolhos, Western Australia, to Streaky Bay, South Australia.)
- Nannamoria johnclarkei Clarke's volute (Bail & Limpus, 1997) (Rottnest Island, Western Australia, to Backstairs Passage, South Australia.)
- Notovoluta kreuslerae Kreusler's volute (Angas, 1865) (Cape Naturaliste, Western Australia, to Cape Otway, Victoria.)

Family Olividae – Olive shells

- Alocospira marginata Margined ancilla (Lamarck, 1810) (Esperance, Western Australia, to southern New South Wales and around Tasmania.)
- Oliva australis Southern olive (Duclos, 1835) (Broome, Western Australia, to Port Fairy, Victoria.)

Family Harpidae – Harp shells

- Austroharpa loisae Lois' southern harp (Rehder, 1973) (Kalbarri to Esperance, Western Australia.)
- Austroharpa punctata Spotted southern harp (Verco, 1896) (Albany, Western Australia, to eastern Bass Strait, Victoria, and King Island, Tasmania.)

==== Subclass Pulmonata ====
Family Amphibolidae

- Salinator fragilis Fragile air-breather (Lamarck, 1822) (Western Australia to Queensland and around Tasmania.)

Family Siphonariidae – Pulmonate limpets, siphons

- Siphonaria denticulata Denticulate siphon shell (Quoy & Gaimard, 1833) (Central New South Wales to Queensland.)
- Siphonaria diemenensis Van Diemen's siphon shell (Quoy & Gaimard, 1833) (Southern Western Australia to central New South Wales and around Tasmania.)
- Siphonaria funiculata Corded siphon shell (Reeve, 1856) (Eastern South Australia to Burnett Heads, Queensland, and around Tasmania.)
- Siphonaria jeanae Jean's siphon shell (Jenkins, 1984) (Kalbarri, Western Australia, to Ceduna, South Australia.)
- Siphonaria tasmanica Banded siphon shell (Tenison Woods, 1876) (Eastern South Australia to Wilsons Promontory, Victoria, and around Tasmania.)
- Siphonaria zelandica Lined siphon shell (Quoy & Gaimard, 1833) (Broome, Western Australia, to Keppel Bay, Queensland.)

Family Onchidiidae – Air-breathing sea slugs

- Onchidella patelloides Intertidal slug (Quoy & Gaimard, 1832) (South Australia to New South Wales and northern Tasmania. Also New Zealand.)

==== Subclass Opisthobranchia ====
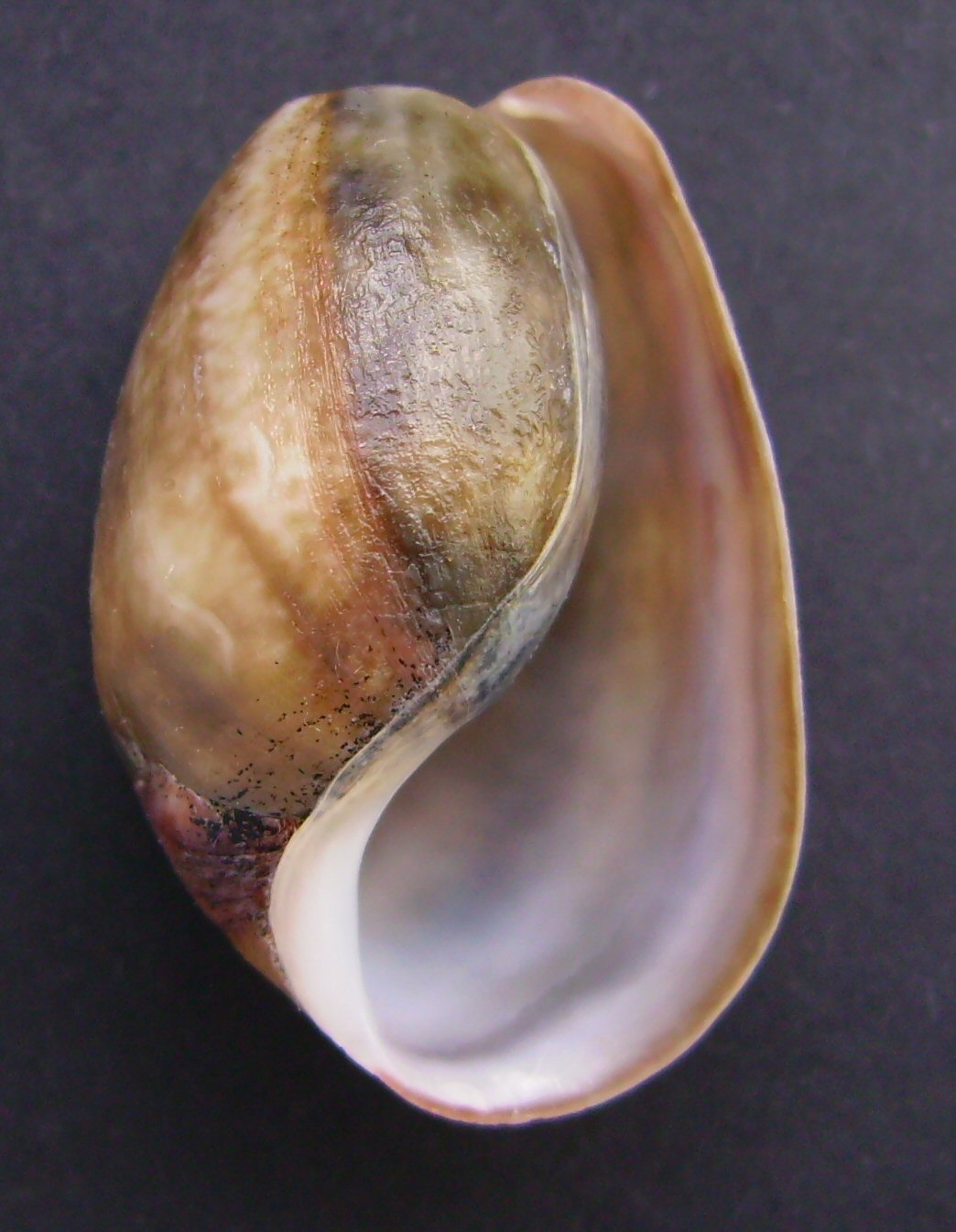
Bulla quoyii (underside) (Botany Bay bubble shell)

Family Bullidae

- Bulla quoyii Botany Bay bubble shell (Gray, 1843) (Carnarvon, Western Australia, to southern Queensland and around Tasmania. Also New Zealand.)

Family Bullinidae

- Bullina lineata Lined bubble shell (Gray, 1825) (Tropical Australia south to Cowaramup, Western Australia, and to Bermagui, New South Wales. Also widespread in the Indo-West Pacific region.)

Family Philinidae

- Philine angasi Angas' sea slug (Crosse & Fischer, 1865) (Cockburn Sound, Western Australia, to southern Queensland and around Tasmania. Also New Zealand.)

Family Gastropteridae

- Sagaminopteron ornatum Ornate sea slug (Tokioka & Baba, 1964) (Around Australia. Also widespread in the Indo-West Pacific region.)

Family Aglajidae

- Chelidonura hirundinina Striped sea dragon (Quoy & Gaimard, 1824) (Tropical Australia south to Rottnest Island, Western Australia, and to Merimbula, New South Wales. Also widespread in the Indo-West Pacific region.)

Family Aplysiidae

- Aplysia dactylomela Reticulated sea hare (Rang, 1828) (Tropical Australia south to Albany, Western Australia, and to Western Port, Victoria. Also widespread overseas.)
- Aplysia gigantea Giant sea hare (Sowerby, 1869) (Esperance to Shark Bay, Western Australia.)
- Aplysia parvula Black-lined sea hare (Mörch, 1863) (Around the Australian mainland and Tasmania. Also widespread overseas.)
- Aplysia sydneyensis Sydney sea hare (Sowerby, 1869) (Southern Western Australia to southern Queensland and around Tasmania.)
- Bursatella sp. Hairy sea hare (Perth to Albany, Western Australia.)

Family Oxynoidae

- Oxynoe viridis Long-tailed bubble slug (Pease, 1861) (Around Australia. Also widespread in the Indo-West Pacific region.)

Family Plakobranchidae

- Elysia expansa Black-margined sea slug (O'Donoghue, 1924) (Houtman Abrolhos to Rottnest Island, Western Australia. Also New Caledonia.)
- Elysia sp. Blue-lined sea slug (Central New South Wales.)

Family Limapontiidae

- Stiliger smaragdinus Cactus sea slug (Baba, 1949) (Perth, Western Australia, to southern New South Wales. Also New Zealand and Japan.)

Family Tylodinidae

- Tylodina corticalis Yellow umbrella shell (Tate, 1889) (Recherche Archipelago, Western Australia, to southern Queensland and around Tasmania.)

Family umbraculidae

- Umbraculum sinicum Umbrella shell (Gmelin, 1793) (Tropical Australia south to Houtman Abrolhos, Western Australia, and to southern New South Wales. Also widespread in the Indo-West Pacific region.)

Family Pleurobranchidae – Side-gilled slugs

- Berthellina citrina Orange side-gilled slug (Rüppell & Leuckart, 1828) (Around the Australian mainland and Tasmania. Also widespread in the Indo-West Pacific region.)
- Pleurobranchaea maculata Grey side-gilled slug (Quoy & Gaimard, 1832) (Southern Western Australia to southern Queensland and around Tasmania. Also New Zealand.)

Family Polyceridae

- Tambja verconis Verco's nudibranch (Basedow & Hedley, 1905) (Southern Western Australia to central New South Wales and around Tasmania. Also New Zealand.)

Family Dorididae - Dorids

- Aphelodoris varia Variable dorid (Abraham, 1877) (Jervis Bay to Cape Byron, New South Wales.)
- Neodoris chrysoderma Marigold dorid (Angas, 1864) (Cape Naturaliste, Western Australia, to Hastings Point, New South Wales, and around Tasmania.)

Family Chromodorididae – Chromodorids

- Archidoris wellingtonensis Wellington's dorid (Abraham, 1877) (Victoria. and Tasmania. Also New Zealand.)
- Cadlina sp. Bass Strait cadlina (Kent Group, Tasmania.)
- Ceratosoma amoenum Sweet ceratosoma (Cheeseman, 1886) (Southern New South Wales to North Stradbroke Island, Queensland, and east coast Tasmania south to Bicheno. Also Lord Howe Island, Norfolk Island and New Zealand.)
- Ceratosoma brevicaudatum Shorttail ceratosoma (Abraham, 1876) (Houtman Abrolhos, Western Australia, to Cape Byron, New South Wales, and around Tasmania.)
- Chromodoris epicuria Epicure chromodorid (Basedow & Hedley, 1905) (Cape Naturaliste, Western Australia, to Western Port, Victoria, and around Tasmania.)
- Chromodoris kuiteri Kuiter's chromodorid (Rudman, 1982) (Tropical Australia south to central New South Wales.)
- Chromodoris tasmaniensis Tasmanian chromodorid (Bergh, 1905) (Portland, Victoria, to Port Hacking, New South Wales, and around Tasmania.)
- Chromodoris tinctoria Red lace chromodorid (Rüppell & Leuckart, 1828) (Tropical Australia southwest to St Vincent Gulf, South Australia. Also in the Indo-West Pacific region.)
- Chromodoris splendida Splendid chromodorid (Angas, 1864) (Southern New South Wales to Mooloolaba, Queensland.)
- Chromodoris westraliensis Western Australian chromodorid (O'Donoghue, 1924) (Rockingham to Point Quobba, Western Australia.)
- Digidentis arbuta Strawberry chromodorid (Burn, 1961) (Cape Naturaliste, Western Australia, to Wilsons Promontory, Victoria, and around Tasmania.)
- Glossodoris atromarginata Black-margined chromodorid (Cuvier, 1804) (Tropical Australia south to southern New South Wales. Also widespread in the Indo-West Pacific region.)
- Hypselodoris bennetti Bennett's chromodorid (Angas, 1864) (Southern New South Wales to Cape Moreton, Queensland.)
- Hypselodoris infucata Flame-tipped chromodorid (Rüppell & Leuckart, 1828) (Tropical Australia southwest to St Vincent Gulf, South Australia. Also widespread in the Indo-West Pacific region.)
- Verconia verconis Verco's chromodorid (Basedow & Hedley, 1905) (Busselton, Western Australia, to Wilsons Promontory, Victoria, and Tasmania.)

Family Dendrodorididae – Dendrodorids

- Dendrodoris nigra Black dendrodorid (Stimpson, 1855) (Around Australia and Tasmania.)
- Dendrodoris peculiaris Flattened dendrodorid (Abraham, 1877) (Cape Naturaliste, Western Australia, to Wilsons Promontory, Victoria, and northern Tasmania.)

Family Phyllidiidae – Phyllidid nudibranchs

- Phyllidiella pustulosa Magpie phyllidid (Cuvier, 1804) (Tropical Australia south to Gulf St Vincent, South Australia, and to Ulladulla, New South Wales. Also widespread in the Indo-West Pacific region.)

Family Aeolidiidae

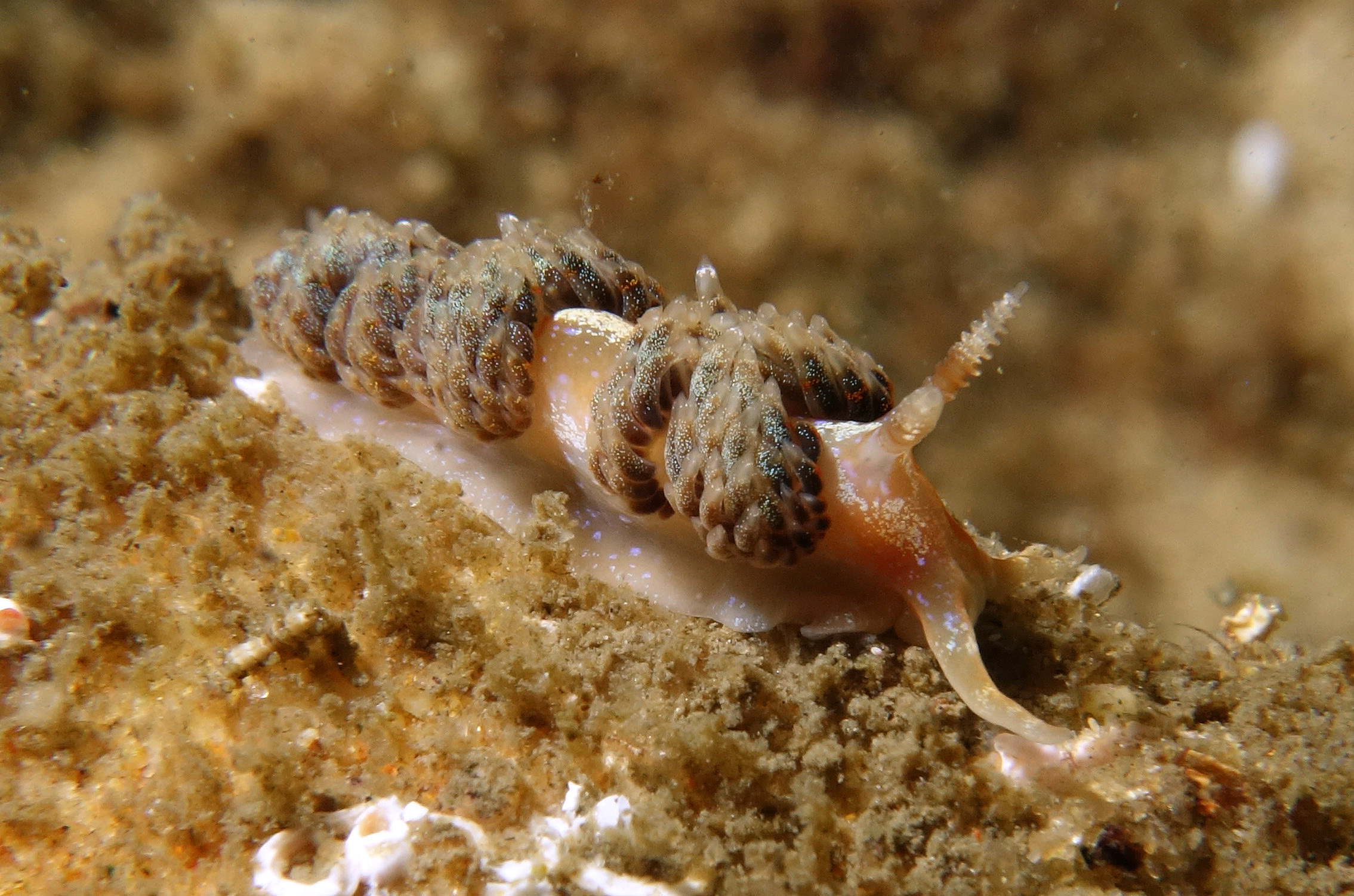
Austraeolis ornata (Ornate facelinid)

- Austraeolis ornata Ornate facelinid (Angas, 1864) (Houtman Abrolhos, Western Australia, to Moreton Bay, Queensland, and around Tasmania.)
- Spurilla macleayi Macleay's facelinid (Angas, 1864) (Albany, Western Australia, to northern New South Wales and around Tasmania.)

Family Glaucidae – Glaucids

- Glaucus marginatus Little sea lizard (Bergh, 1860) (Around Australia and Tasmania.)

Family Facelinidae

- Phyllodesmium serratum Serrated phyllodesmium (Baba, 1949) (Around Australia and Tasmania. Also Japan.)
- Pteraeolidia ianthina Blue dragon (Angas, 1864) (Tropical Australia south to Gulf St Vincent, South Australia, and to Jervis Bay, New South Wales. Also widespread in the Indo-West Pacific region.)

Family Flabellinidae

- Flabellina poenicia Multicoloured flabellina (Burn, 1957) (South Australia to Port Stephens (New South Wales), and around Tasmania.)
- Flabellina rubrolineata Red-lined flabellina (O'Donoghue, 1929) (Tropical Australia south to eastern Victoria. Also widespread in the Indo-West Pacific region.)

Family Arminidae

- Armina sp. Southern seapen slug (Southern Tasmania.)

=== Class Bivalvia ===
Family Solemyidae – Date shells

- Solemya australis Southern date shell (Lamarck, 1818) (Fremantle, Western Australia, to Andersons Inlet, Victoria, and south to Bicheno, Tasmania.)

Family Arcidae – Ark shells

- Anadara trapezia Sydney cockle (Deshayes, 1840) (Port Phillip Bay, Victoria, to southern Queensland, with an isolated population at Albany, Western Australia.)
- Barbatia pistachia Hairy ark (Lamarck, 1819) (Kimberley, Western Australia, to Queensland and around Tasmania.)

Family Nuculanidae – Beaked nut shells

- Nuculana crassa Small-beaked nutshell (Hinds, 1843) (Southern Western Australia to New South Wales and around Tasmania.)

Family Glycimeridae – Dog cockles

- Glycymeris grayana Flamed dog cockle (Lamarck, 1819) (Victoria to central New South Wales and south to Little Swanport, Tasmania.)
- Glycymeris radians Dark dog cockle (Lamarck, 1819) (Albany, Western Australia, to New South Wales and around Tasmania.)
- Glycymeris striatularis Striated dog cockle (Lamarck, 1819) (Port Gregory, Western Australia, to southern Queensland and around Tasmania.)

Family Mytilidae – Mussels

- Amygdalum beddomei Beddome's mussel (Iredale, 1924) (Southern Western Australia to southern Queensland and around Tasmania.)
- Austromytilus rostratus Beaked mussel (Dunker, 1857) (Southern Western Australia to southern New South Wales and around Tasmania.)
- Brachidontes erosus Eroded mussel (Lamarck, 1819) (Albany, Western Australia, to San Remo, Victoria, and northern Tasmania.)
- Limnoperna pulex Flea mussel (Lamarck, 1819) (Yanchep, Western Australia, to New South Wales and around Tasmania.)
- Modiolus albicostus White mussel (Lamarck, 1819) (Southern Western Australia to New South Wales and around Tasmania.)
- Modiolus cottoni Cotton's horse mussel (Laseron, 1956) (Fremantle, Western Australia, to southern New South Wales and around Tasmania.)
- Musculista senhousia East Asian bag mussel (Benson, 1842) (Swan River estuary, Western Australia, Port Phillip Bay, Victoria, and Tamar estuary, Tasmania. Also East Asia, California, New Zealand.)
- Mytilus galloprovincialis Blue mussel, edible mussel (Lamarck 1819) (Perth, Western Australia, to New South Wales and around Tasmania. Also widespread overseas.)
- Trichomya hirsuta Hairy mussel (Lamarck, 1819) (Great Australian Bight, South Australia, to southern Queensland, and Flinders Island, Tasmania.)

Family Pinnidae – Razor clams

- Atrina tasmanica Tasmanian razor clam (Tenison Woods, 1876) (Port Lincoln, South Australia, to southern New South Wales and northern and eastern Tasmania.)
- Pinna bicolor Razor clam, razorfish (Gmelin, 1791) (Tropical Australia around the southwest to Gulf St Vincents, South Australia, and down the east coast to New South Wales. Also widespread in the Indo-West Pacific region.)

Family Pteriidae – Pearl oysters

- Electroma georgiana Delicate wing shell (Quoy & Gaimard, 1835) (Southern Western Australia to southern New South Wales and around Tasmania.)

Family Malleidae – Hammer oysters, finger oysters

- Malleus meridianus Southern hammer oyster (Cotton, 1930) (Fremantle, Western Australia, to Gulf St Vincents, South Australia.)
- Vulsella spongiarum Sponge finger oyster (Lamarck, 1819) (Fremantle, Western Australia, to Mallacoota, Victoria, and around Tasmania.)

Family Pectenidae – Scallops, fan shells

- Equichlamys bifrons Queen scallop (Lamarck 1819) (Ceduna, South Australia, to southern New South Wales and around Tasmania.)
- Mimachlamys asperrima Doughboy scallop (Lamarck, 1819) (Shark Bay, Western Australia, to southern Queensland and around Tasmania.)
- Notochlamys hexactes Tasmanian scallop (Peron, 1819) (Yorke Peninsula, South Australia, to Twofold Bay, New South Wales, and around Tasmania.)
- Pecten fumatus Commercial scallop, king scallop (Reeve, 1852) (Shark Bay, Western Australia, to central Queensland.)
- Scaeochlamys livida Spiny scallop (Lamarck, 1819) (Jervis Bay, New South Wales, to Queensland.)

Family Spondylidae – Thorny oysters

- Spondylus tenellus Thorny oyster (Reeve, 1856) (Southern Western Australia to New South Wales and south to Maria Island, Tasmania.)

Family Anomiidae – Jingle shells, windowpane shells

- Anomia trigonopsis Orange jingle (Hutton, 1877) (Southern Western Australia to New South Wales and northern Tasmania. Also New Zealand.)

Family Limidae – File shells

- Lima nimbifer File shell (Iredale, 1924) (Around the Australian mainland and Tasmania.)
- Limatula strangei Ridged file shell (Sowerby, 1872) (Southern Western Australia to southern Queensland and around Tasmania.)

Family Ostreidae – Oysters

- Crassostrea gigas Pacific oyster (Thunberg, 1793) (Central South Australia to Port Stephens (New South Wales), and northern and eastern Tasmania. Also Japan and widespread overseas.)
- Ostrea angasi Native oyster, mud oyster, flat oyster (Sowerby 1871) (Fremantle, Western Australia, to New South Wales and around Tasmania.)
- Saccostrea glomerata Sydney rock oyster (Gould, 1850) (Port Phillip Bay, Victoria, to southern Queensland. Also New Zealand.)

Family Trigoniidae – Brooch shells

- Neotrigonia margaritacea Brooch shell (Lamarck, 1804) (Victoria. to New South Wales and around Tasmania.)

Family Lucinidae – Lucinids

- Anodontia perplexa Fragile lucinid (Cotton & Godfrey, 1938) (Southern Western Australia to central Queensland.)
- Divalucina cumingi Cuming's lucinid (Adams & Angas, 1863) (Around the Australian mainland and Tasmania.)

Family Galeommatidae – Luna shells

- Ephippodonta lunata White luna shell (Tate, 1886) (Southern Western Australia to central South Australia.)
- Lasaea australis Southern kellia (Lamarck, 1819) (Southern Western Australia to New South Wales and around Tasmania.)
- Scintilla sp. Fragile luna shell (Southern Western Australia.)

Family Carditidae – Carditas

- Cardita incrassata Grooved cardita (Sowerby, 1825) (Tropical Australia south to Albany, Western Australia.)

Family Crassatellidae – Crassatellas

- Eucrassatella kingicola King Island crassatella (Lamarck, 1805) (South Australia to southern New South Wales and around Tasmania.)

Family Cardiidae – Cockles

- Fulvia tenuicostata Thin-ribbed cockle (Lamarck, 1819) (Fremantle, Western Australia, to northern New South Wales and around Tasmania.)

Family Mactridae – Trough shells

- Lutraria rhynchaena Gaping otter shell (Jonas, 1844) (Southern Western Australia to New South Wales and northern Tasmania.)
- Mactra pura White trough shell (Reeve, 1854) (Point Samson, Western Australia, to Victoria and northern Tasmania.)
- Mactra rufescens Rufous trough shell (Reeve, 1854) (Shark Bay, Western Australia, to New South Wales and around Tasmania.)
- Spisula trigonella Three-cornered trough shell (Lamarck, 1819) (Around the Australian mainland and Tasmania.)

Family Mesodesmatidae – Wedge shells

- Anapella cycladea Estuarine wedge shell (Lamarck, 1819) (Around the Australian mainland and Tasmania.)
- Paphies elongata Elongate surf clam (Reeve, 1854) (Fremantle, Western Australia, to New South Wales and around Tasmania.)
- Paphies erycinaea Brown surf clam (Lamarck, 1818) (Victoria and around Tasmania.)

Family Solenidae – Razor shells

- Solen correctus Eastern razor shell (Iredale 1924) (Southern New South Wales to Queensland.)
- Solen vaginoides Southern razor shell (Lamarck, 1818) (Fremantle, Western Australia, to New South Wales and around Tasmania.)

Family Tellinidae – Tellins

- Tellina albinella Pink tellin (Lamarck, 1818) (Southern Western Australia to New South Wales and around Tasmania.)
- Tellina deltoidalis Triangular tellin (Lamarck, 1818) (Fremantle, Western Australia, to southern Queensland and around Tasmania.)
- Tellina margaritina Rounded tellin (Lamarck, 1818) (Southern Western Australia to Victoria and around Tasmania.)

Family Donacidae – Pipis

- Donax deltoides Pipi, Goolwa cockle (Lamarck, 1818) (Around Australia.)

Family Psammobiidae – Sunset shells

- Gari livida White sunset shell (Lamarck, 1818) (Southern Western Australia to New South Wales and around Tasmania.)
- Soletellina biradiata Sunset shell (Wood, 1815) (Kalbarri, Western Australia, to New South Wales and around Tasmania.)

Family Veneridae – Venus shells

- Bassina pachyphylla Faint-frill venus (Jonas, 1839) (Central South Australia to New South Wales and around Tasmania.)
- Circe scripta Rusty venus (Linnaeus, 1758) (Tropical Australia south to central New South Wales.)
- Circomphalus disjecta Frilled venus (Perry, 1811) (Bluff Point, Western Australia, to New South Wales and around Tasmania.)
- Dosinia coerulea Blue-tinged dosinia (Reeve, 1850) (Queenscliff, Victoria, to southern Queensland and around Tasmania.)
- Dosinia incisa Reeve's dosinia (Reeve, 1850) (Tropical Australia south to Cockburn Sound, Western Australia.)
- Eumarcia fumigata Smoky venus (Sowerby, 1853) (Southern Western Australia to southern Queensland and around Tasmania.)
- Katelysia rhytiphora Common cockle (Lamy, 1937) (Albany, Western Australia, to southern New South Wales and around Tasmania.)
- Katelysia scalarina Ridged cockle (Lamarck, 1818) (Augusta, Western Australia, to southern New South Wales and around Tasmania.)
- Paphia crassisulca Solid cockle (Lamarck, 1818) (Tropical Australia south to Albany, Western Australia, and to New South Wales.)
- Placamen placidum Grooved venus (Philippi, 1844) (Southern Western Australia to central Queensland and around Tasmania.)
- Tapes dorsatus Scribbled venus (Lamarck, 1818) (Tropical Australia south to southern New South Wales.)
- Tawera gallinula Ridged tawera (Lamarck, 1818) (Southern Western Australia to New South Wales and around Tasmania.)
- Tawera lagopus Fine tawera (Lamarck, 1818) (Southern Western Australia to New South Wales and around Tasmania.)
- Venerupis anomala Small bean cockle (Lamarck, 1818) (South Australia to southern Queensland and around Tasmania. Also New Zealand.)
- Venerupis galactites Large bean cockle (Lamarck, 1818) (Perth, Western Australia, to New South Wales and around Tasmania.)

Family Cleidothaeridae

- Cleidothaerus albidus Rock cupshell (Lamarck, 1819) (Rottnest Island, Western Australia, to New South Wales and around Tasmania.)

Family Hiatellidae

- Panopea australis Mud borer (Sowerby, 1833) (South Australia to New South Wales and around Tasmania.)

Family Pholadidae – Angel wings, piddocks

- Barnea australasiae Australasian angel wing (Sowerby, 1849) (Kalbarri, Western Australia, to Queensland and around Tasmania.)
- Barnea obturamentum Beaked angel wing (Hedley, 1893) (South Australia to New South Wales and around Tasmania.)

Family Teredinidae – Shipworms, teredos

- Bankia australis Southern shipworm (Calman, 1920) (Western Australia to Queensland and around Tasmania.)

=== Class Cephalopoda ===
Family Octopodidae – Octopuses

- Hapalochlaena maculosa Blue-ringed octopus (Hoyle, 1883) (Southern Western Australia to southern Queensland and northern Tasmania.)
- Octopus berrima Speckled octopus (Stranks & Norman, 1992) (Great Australian Bight, South Australia, to Eden, New South Wales, and around Tasmania.)
- Octopus bunurong Southern white spot octopus (Stranks, 1990) (Great Australian Bight, South Australia, to southern New South Wales and around Tasmania.)
- Octopus kaurna Sand octopus (Stranks, 1990) (Great Australian Bight, South Australia, to eastern Victoria and around Tasmania.)
- Octopus maorum Maori octopus (Hutton, 1880) (Great Australian Bight, South Australia, to Lakes Entrance, Victoria, and around Tasmania.)
- Octopus pallidus Pale octopus (Hoyle, 1885) (Great Australian Bight, South Australia, to southern New South Wales and around Tasmania.)
- Octopus tetricus Gloomy octopus (Gould, 1852) (Cape Conran, Victoria, to Moreton Bay, Queensland.)
- Octopus warringa Pygmy octopus (Stranks, 1990) (South Australia to Victoria and around Tasmania. Also New Zealand.)

Family Argonautidae – Argonauts, paper nautiluses

- Argonauta nodosus Paper nautilus (Solander, 1786) (Western Australia to New South Wales and around Tasmania. Also widespread in the Indo-West Pacific region.)

Family Sepiidae – Cuttlefish

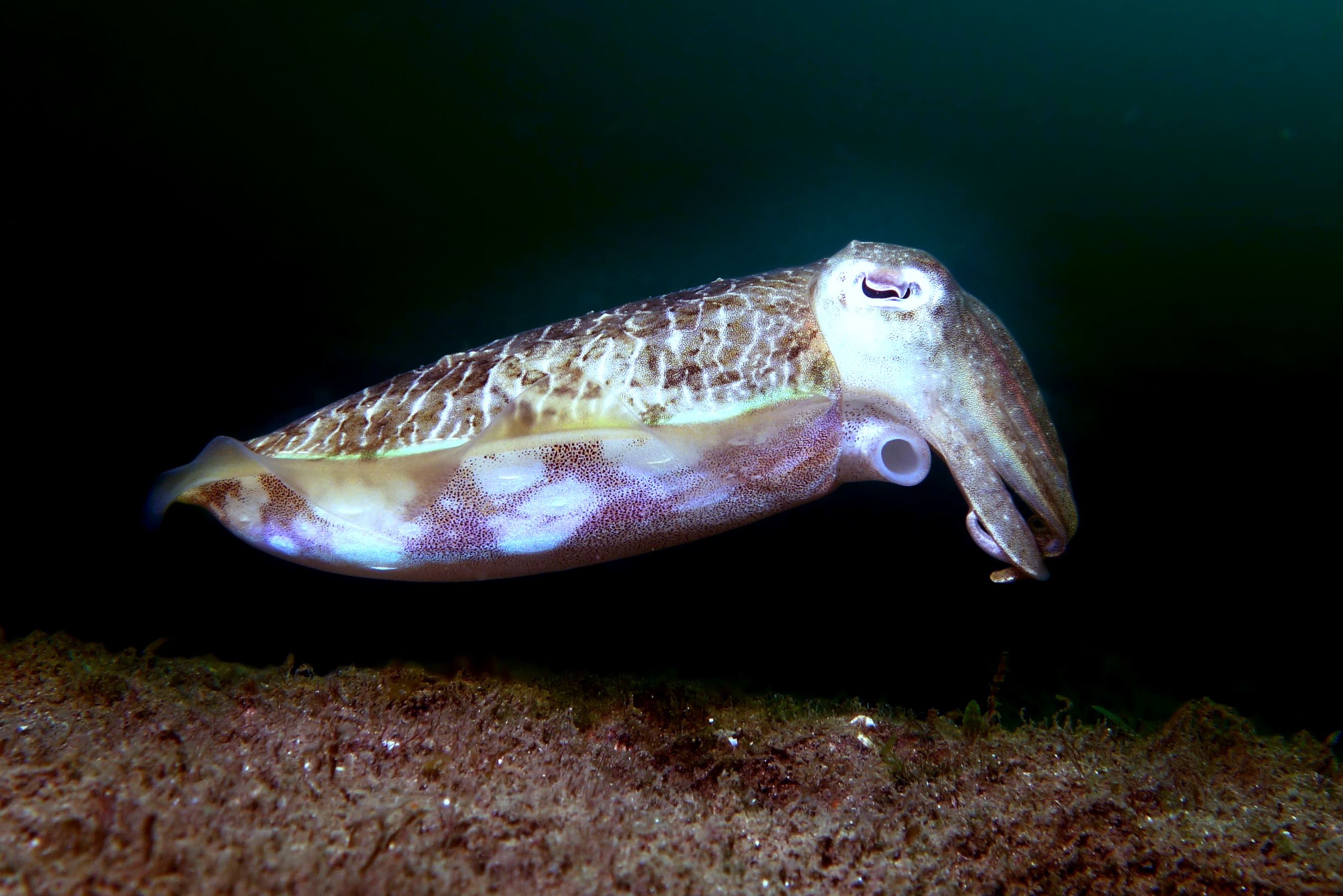
Sepia plangon (Mourning cuttle)

- Sepia apama Giant cuttle (Gray, 1849) (Point Cloates, Western Australia, to Moreton Bay, Queensland, and south to Tasman Peninsula, Tasmania.)
- Sepia mestus Red cuttle (Gray, 1849) (Jervis Bay, New South Wales, to Cooktown, Queensland.)
- Sepia plangon Mourning cuttle (Gray, 1849) (Sydney New South Wales, to Gulf of Carpentaria, Queensland.)

Family Loliginidae – Squid

- Sepioteuthis australis Southern calamary (Quoy & Gaimard, 1833) (Dampier, Western Australia, to Brisbane, Queensland, and around Tasmania. Also New Zealand.)

Family Idiosepiidae – Pygmy squid

- Idiosepius notoides Southern pygmy squid (Berry, 1821) (Cockburn Sound, Western Australia, to southern Queensland and around Tasmania.)

Family Sepiolidae – Bobtail squids, dumpling squids

- Euprymna tasmanica Southern bobtail squid, southern dumpling squid (Pfeffer, 1884) (Shark Bay, Western Australia, to Brisbane, Queensland, and around Tasmania.)

Family Sepiadariidae – Bottletail squids

- Sepioloidea lineolata Striped pyjama squid, lined dumpling squid (Quoy & Gaimard, 1832) (Southern Western Australia to southern Queensland.)

Family Serpulidae – Ram's horn squid

- Spirula spirula Ram's horn squid (Linnaeus, 1758) (Around Australia and Tasmania. Also widespread overseas.)

== Phylum Brachiopoda ==
- Magellania flavescens Southern lampshell (Lamarck, 1819) (Southern Western Australia to New South Wales and northern Tasmania.)

== Phylum Phoronida ==
- Phoronis australis Southern phoronid (Haswell, 1883) (Perth, Western Australia, to Moreton Bay, Queensland.)

== Phylum Bryozoa ==
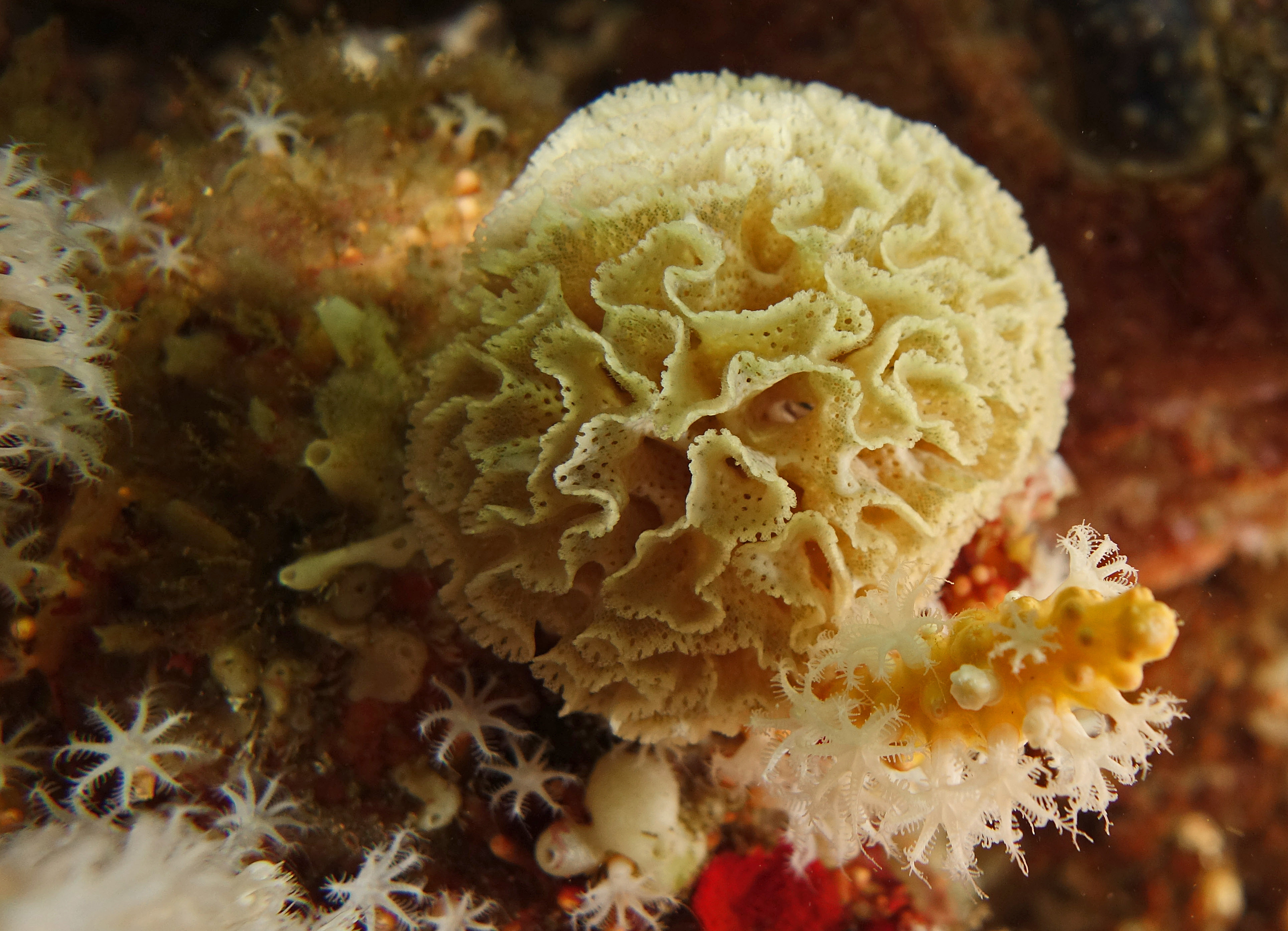
Triphyllozoon moniliferum (Lace bryozoan)

- Adeona grisea Black sieve bryozoan (Lamouroux, 1816) (Western Australia to Victoria and northern Tasmania.)
- Bugula dentata Green soft bryozoan (Lamouroux, 1816) (Western Australia to Queensland and around Tasmania.)
- Bugula serrata Spiralled soft bryozoan (Lamarck, 1816) (Lacepede Bay, South Australia, to Victoria and around Tasmania.)
- Bugularia dissimilis Flat-branched bryozoan (Busk, 1852) (Victoria and around Tasmania.)
- Celleporaria Orange plate bryozoan sp.1 (South Australia to Victoria and northern Tasmania.)
- Celleporaria Nippled bryozoan sp.2 (Southern Western Australia to South Australia.)
- Cornucopina grandis Grey tangle bryozoan (Busk, 1852) (Victoria and around Tasmania.)
- Hornera robusta Cream sea lace (MacGillivray, 1883) (Victoria and around Tasmania. Also New Zealand.)
- Iodictyum phoeniceum Purple bryozoan (Busk, 1854) (South Australia to Queensland and around Tasmania. Also Lord Howe Island.)
- Lichenopora echinata Prickly bryozoan (MacGillivray, 1884) (Western Australia to Victoria and around Tasmania.)
- Membranipora membranacea Kelp bryozoan (Linnaeus, 1758) (Western Australia to New South Wales and around Tasmania. Also widespread overseas.)
- Orthoscuticella ventricosa Orange filamentous bryozoan (Busk, 1852) (Encounter Bay, South Australia, to Victoria and around Tasmania.)
- Parmularia smeatoni Little fan bryozoan (MacGillivray, 1890) (South Australia Gulfs.)
- Schizoporella errata Orange encrusting bryozoan (Waters, 1878) (South Australia to southern Queensland and around Tasmania.)
- Steginoporella chartacea Folded-plate bryozoan (Lamarck, 1816) (Gulf St Vincent, South Australia, to southern New South Wales and northern Tasmania.)
- Triphyllozoon moniliferum Lace bryozoan, lace coral (MacGillivray, 1860) (Western Australia to New South Wales and around Tasmania.)
- Triphyllozoon umbonatum Open lace bryozoan (MacGillivray, 1884) (Kangaroo Island, South Australia, to Victoria and around Tasmania.)

== Phylum Entoprocta ==
- Pedicellina pyriformis Pear-shaped entoproct (Ryland, 1965) (Eastern Tasmania. Also New Zealand.)

== Phylum Chaetognatha ==
- Spadella sp. Seaweed arrow worm (Western Australia to New South Wales and around Tasmania.)

== Phylum Echinodermata ==
=== Class Crinoidea ===
(Feather stars, crinoids)

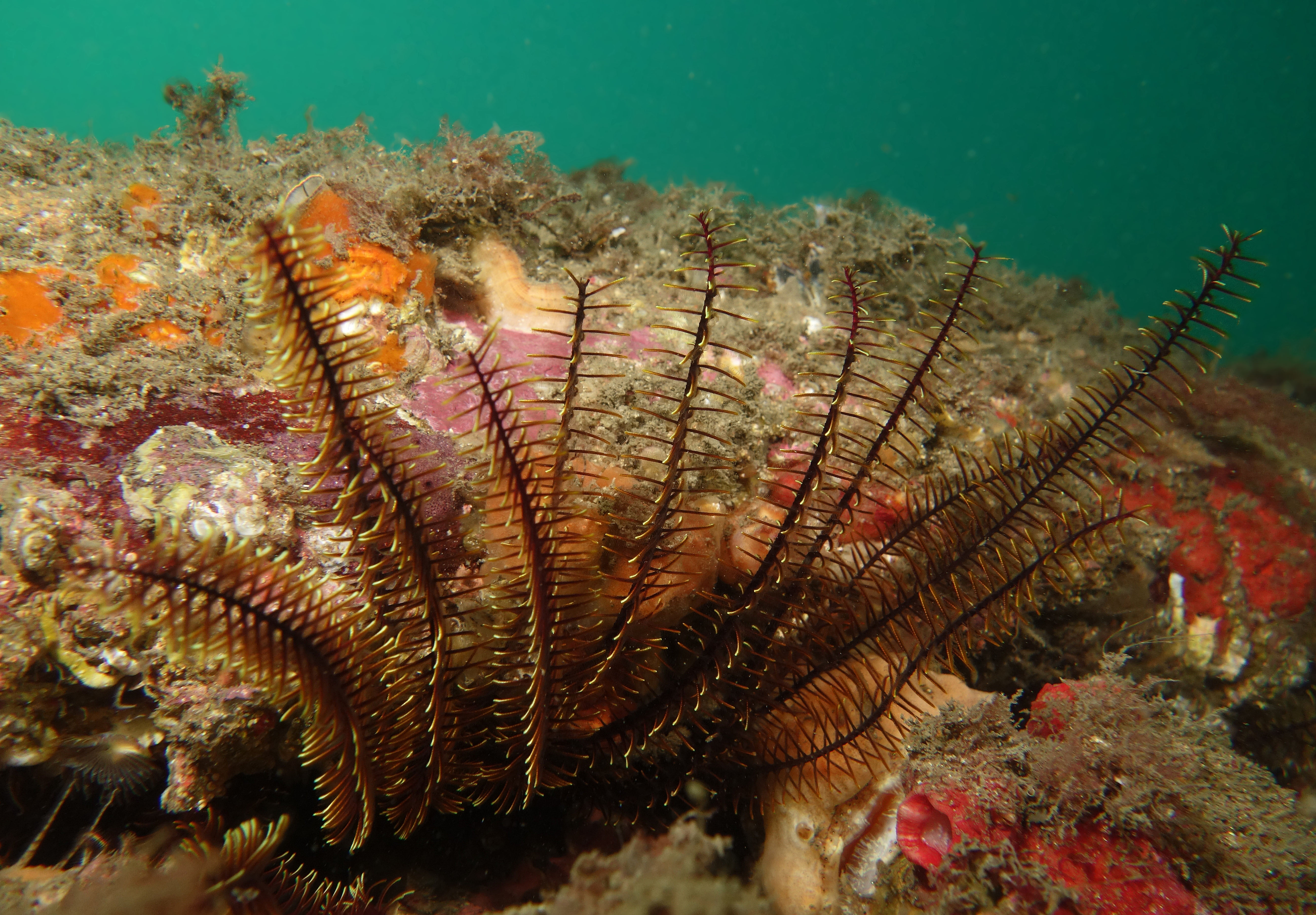
Comanthus trichoptera (Feather star)

Family Comatulidae

- Comanthus tasmaniae Tasmanian feather star (A.H. Clark, 1911) (Fremantle, Western Australia, to Byron Bay, New South Wales, and around Tasmania.)
- Comanthus trichoptera Orange feather star (Müller, 1846) (Fremantle, Western Australia, to Byron Bay, New South Wales, and around Tasmania.)
- Comatula purpurea Purple feather star (Müller, 1841) (Tropical Australia south to Fremantle, Western Australia. Also widespread in the Indo-West Pacific region.)

Family Antedonidae

- Antedon incommoda Variable feather star (Bell, 1888) (Dampier Archipelago, Western Australia, to Solitary Islands, New South Wales, and around Tasmania.)
- Antedon loveni Loven's feather star (Bell, 1882) (Victor Harbor, South Australia, to Byron Bay, New South Wales, and around Tasmania.)

Family Aporometridae

- Aporometra occidentalis Western feather star (H.L. Clark, 1938) (Yanchep, Western Australia, to Bass Strait, Victoria.)
- Aporometra wilsoni (Bell, 1888) (Elizabeth Reef, Perth, Western Australia, to Gabo Island, Victoria.)

Family Ptilometridae

- Ptilometra australis Southern passion star (Wilton, 1843) (Eden to the Clarence River, New South Wales. Also the Kent Group, Tasmania.)
- Ptilometra macronema Western passion star (Müller, 1846) (Shark Bay, Western Australia, to Port Phillip Bay, Victoria.)

=== Class Asteroidea ===
(Sea stars, starfish)

Family Luidiidae

- Luidia australiae Southern sand star (Döderlein, 1920) (Yanchep, Western Australia, to Moreton Bay, Queensland, and south to Bicheno, Tasmania.)

Family Astropectinidae

- Astropecten pectinatus Pink sand star (Sladen, 1883) (Rottnest Island, Western Australia, to Newcastle, New South Wales, and around Tasmania.)
- Astropecten polyacanthus Many-spined sand star (Müller & Troschel, 1842) (Tropical Australia south to Sydney, New South Wales. Also widespread in the Indo-West Pacific region.)
- Astropecten preissi Preiss' sand star (Müller & Troschel, 1843) (Shark Bay, Western Australia, to Gulf St Vincent, South Australia.)
- Astropecten triseriatus Three-spined sand star (Müller & Troschel, 1843) (North West Cape to King George Sound, Western Australia. Also widespread in the Indo-West Pacific region.)
- Astropecten vappa Comb sand star (Müller & Troschel, 1843) (Around the Australian mainland.)

Family Archasteridae

- Archaster angulatus Angular seastar (Müller & Troschel, 1842) (Tropical Australia south to Cape Naturaliste, Western Australia, and to the Whitsunday Islands, Queensland. Also widespread in the Indo-West Pacific region.)

Family Goniasteridae

- Pentagonaster dubeni Vermilion biscuit star (Gray, 1847) (Shark Bay, Western Australia, to southern Queensland and around Tasmania.)
- Stellaster inspinosus Apricot biscuit star (H.L. Clark, 1916) (Barrow Island to Mandurah, Western Australia.)
- Tosia australis Southern biscuit star (Gray, 1840) (Fremantle, Western Australia, to southern New South Wales and around Tasmania.)
- Tosia magnifica Magnificent biscuit star (Müller & Troschel, 1842) (Southern Western Australia to eastern Victoria and around Tasmania.)

Family Oreasteridae

- Anthenea australiae Australian cushion star (Döderlein, 1915) (Broome to Fremantle, Western Australia.)
- Anthenea edmondi Sydney cushion star (Clark & Rowe, 1971) (Eden, New South Wales, to Fraser Island, Queensland.)
- Anthaster valvulatus Mottled seastar (Müller & Troschel, 1843) (Yanchep, Western Australia, to Gulf St Vincent, South Australia.)
- Goniodiscaster seriatus Western biscuit star (Müller & Troschel, 1843) (Point Maude to Cape Naturaliste, Western Australia.)
- Nectria macrobrachia Large-plated seastar (H.L. Clark, 1923) (Port Gregory, Western Australia, to Wilsons Promontory, Victoria, and King Island and Kent Group, Tasmania.)
- Nectria multispina Multi-spined seastar (H.L. Clark, 1928) (Fremantle, Western Australia, to Wilsons Promontory, Victoria.)
- Nectria ocellata Spotted seastar (Perrier, 1875) (Eucla, Western Australia, to northern New South Wales and around Tasmania.)
- Nectria saoria Saori's seastar (Shepherd, 1967) (Fremantle, Western Australia, to Port Phillip Bay, Victoria.)
- Nectria wilsoni Wilson's seastar (Shepherd & Hodgkin, 1965) (Beagle Island, Western Australia, to Lakes Entrance, Victoria.)

Family Asterodiscididae

- Asterodiscides truncatus Firebrick seastar (Coleman, 1911) (Eucla, Western Australia, to Solitary Islands, New South Wales, and northeastern Tasmania. Also Kermadec Islands.)

Family Pterasteridae

- Euretaster insignis Striking seastar (Sladen, 1882) (Tropical Australia south to Dunsborough, Western Australia, and to Moreton Bay, Queensland. Also widespread in the Indo-West Pacific region.)

Family Asteropseidae

- Petricia vernicina Cushion star (Lamarck, 1816) (Houtman Abrolhos, Western Australia, to Caloundra, Queensland, and around Tasmania. Also Lord Howe Island, Norfolk Island and Kermadec Islands.)

Family Ophidiasteridae

- Fromia polypora Many-spotted seastar (H.L. Clark, 1916) (Houtman Abrolhos, Western Australia, to Sydney, New South Wales, and around Tasmania.)
- Ophidiaster confertus Orange long-armed seastar (H.L. Clark 1916) (Jervis Bay, New South Wales, to central Queensland. Also Lord Howe Island and Norfolk Island.)
- Plectaster decanus Mosaic seastar (Müller & Troschel, 1843) (Two Rocks, Western Australia, to Byron Bay, New South Wales, and northern Tasmania.)

Family Echinasteridae

- Echinaster arcystatus Pale mosaic seastar (H.L. Clark, 1914) (Shark Bay, Western Australia, to Montague Island, New South Wales, and the Furneaux Group, Tasmania.)
- Echinaster colemani Coleman's seastar (Rowe & Albertson, 1987) (Ulladulla, New South Wales, to Moreton Bay, Queensland. Also Norfolk Island.)
- Echinaster glomeratus Orange reef star (H.L. Clark, 1916) (Houtman Abrolhos, Western Australia, to Cape Jervis, South Australia.)
- Echinaster varicolor Multi-coloured seastar (H.L. Clark, 1938) (Broome to Recherche Archipelago, Western Australia.)

Family Asterinidae

- Allostichaster polyplax Many-armed seastar (Muller & Troschel, 1844) (Houtman Abrolhos, Western Australia, to Solitary Islands, New South Wales, and around Tasmania. Also New Zealand.)
- Asterias amurensis North Pacific seastar (Lutkin, 1871) (Port Phillip Bay to Inverloch, Victoria, and eastern Tasmania. Also Japan, China, Russia.)
- Australiaster dubia Southern five-armed seastar (H.L. Clark, 1909) (Spencer Gulf, South Australia, to Crowdy Head, New South Wales, and around Tasmania.)
- Astrostole scaber Seven-armed seastar (Hutton, 1872) (Port Davey to Eddystone Point, Tasmania. Also New Zealand.)
- Coscinasterias muricata Eleven-armed seastar (Verrill, 1867) (Houtman Abrolhos, Western Australia, to southern Queensland and around Tasmania. Also New Zealand.)
- Meridiastra atyphoida Dark-tipped button star (H.L. Clarke, 1916) (Rottnest Island, Western Australia, to East Gippsland, Victoria, and around Tasmania.)
- Meridiastra calcar Eight-armed seastar (Lamarck, 1816) (Albany, Western Australia, to Currumbin, Queensland, and around Tasmania.)
- Meridiastra gunnii Gunn's six-armed star (Gray, 1840) (Abrolhos Island, Western Australia, to eastern Victoria, and around Tasmania.)
- Meridiastra medius Southern six-armed star (O'Loughlin, Waters & Roy, 2003) (Perth, Western Australia, to Walkerville, Victoria, and around Tasmania.)
- Meridiastra occidens Western six-armed star (O'Loughlin, Waters & Roy, 2003) (Kalbarri, Western Australia, to Port Fairy, Victoria.)
- Meridiastra oriens Eastern six-armed star (O'Loughlin, Waters & Roy, 2003) (Perth, Western Australia, and Nuyts Archipelago, South Australia, to Rockhampton, Queensland, and around Tasmania. Also Lord Howe Island.)
- Meridiastra scobinata Stellate button star (Livingstone, 1933) (Port Lincoln, South Australia, to Cape Liptrap, Victoria, and around Tasmania.)
- Nepanthia crassa Western seastar (Gray, 1847) (Point Cloates to Cape Naturaliste, Western Australia.)
- Paranepanthia grandis Grand seastar (H.L. Clark, 1928) (Point Peron, Western Australia, to Sydney, New South Wales, and around Tasmania.)
- Parvulastra exigua Rockpool star (Lamarck, 1816) (Port Lincoln, South Australia, to southern Queensland and around Tasmania.)
- Parvulastra parvivipara Little patti, pigmy live-bearing star (Keough & Dartnall, 1978) (Ceduna to D'Anville Bay, South Australia.)
- Parvulastra vivipara Orange live-bearing star (Dartnall, 1969) (Eaglehawk Neck to Margate, Tasmania.)
- Patiriella regularis Regular seastar (Verrill, 1867) (Derwent estuary, Tasmania. Also New Zealand.)
- Pseudonepanthia nigrobrunnea Dusky seastar (Rowe & Marsh, 1982) (Northern New South Wales to Double Island Point, Queensland.)
- Pseudonepanthia troughtoni Troughton's seastar (Livingstone, 1934) (Green Head, Western Australia, to Wilsons Promontory, Victoria, and King Island and the Kent Group, Tasmania.)

Family Asteriidae

- Smilasterias irregularis Irregular seastar (H.L. Clark, 1928) (Nuyts Archipelago, South Australia, to Shellharbour, New South Wales, and northern Tasmania.)
- Smilasterias multipara Victorian seastar (O'Loughlin & O'Hara, 1990) (Cape Bridgewater to Wilsons Promontory, Victoria, and northern and eastern Tasmania.)
- Uniophora dyscrita Western granular seastar (Clark, 1923) (Lancelin to Esperance, Western Australia.)
- Uniophora granifera Granular seastar (Lamarck, 1816) (Spencer Gulf, South Australia, to Solitary Islands, New South Wales, and around Tasmania.)
- Uniophora nuda Bare seastar (Perrier, 1875) (Spencer Gulf and Gulf St Vincent, South Australia.)

=== Class Ophiuroidea ===
(Brittle stars)

Family Ophiomyxidae

- Ophiomyxa australis Southern serpent star (Lütken, 1869) (Around Australia, including Tasmania. Also widespread in the Indo-West Pacific region.)

Family Gorgonocephalidae – Basket stars

- Astroboa ernae Pink basket star (Döderlein, 1911) (Shark Bay, Western Australia, to central South Australia.)
- Astrosierra amblyconus Granular basket star (H.L. Clark, 1909) (Babel Island, Tasmania, to Sandon, New South Wales.)
- Conocladus australis Southern basket star (Verrill, 1876) (Jurien Bay, Western Australia, to southern Queensland and around Tasmania.)

Family Asteroschematidae – Snake stars

- Astrobrachion constrictum Eastern snake star (Farquhar, 1900) (Eden to Coffs Harbour, New South Wales, and Cape Barren Island, Tasmania. Also Lord Howe Island.)

Family Amphiuridae

- Amphiura elandiformis Snake arm brittle star (A.M. Clark, 1966) (Spencer Gulf, South Australia, to Lakes Entrance, Victoria, and around Tasmania.)

Family Ophiactidae

- Ophiactis resiliens Chequered brittle star (Lyman, 1879) (Rottnest Island, Western Australia, to southern Queensland and around Tasmania. Also Lord Howe Island and New Zealand.)

Family Ophiotrichidae

- Ophiothrix caespitosa Spiny-armed brittle star (Lyman, 1879) (Shark Bay, Western Australia, to southern Queensland and northern Tasmania.)
- Ophiothrix spongicola Large spiny-armed brittle star (Stimpson, 1855) (Houtman Abrolhos, Western Australia, to southern Queensland.)

Family Ophiocomidae

- Clarkcoma canaliculata Variable brittle star (Lütken, 1869) (Shark Bay, Western Australia, to Sydney, New South Wales, and around Tasmania.)
- Clarkcoma pulchra White-flecked brittle star (H.L. Clark, 1928) (Dongara, Western Australia, to Byron Bay, New South Wales.)

Family Ophionereidae

- Ophionereis schayeri Schayer's brittle star (Muller & Troschel, 1849) (Shark Bay, Western Australia, to Collaroy, New South Wales, and around Tasmania.)

Family Ophiodermatidae

- Ophiopsammus assimilis Mottled brittle star (Bell, 1888) (Dongara, Western Australia, to Byron Bay, New South Wales.)
- Ophiopeza cylindrica Live-bearing brittle star (Hutton, 1872) (Dongara, Western Australia, to Coffs Harbour, New South Wales. Also New Zealand.)
- Ophiarachnella ramsayi Ramsay's serpent star (Bell, 1888) (Houtman Abrolhos, Western Australia, to southern Queensland and northern Tasmania.)

Family Ophiuridae

- Ophioceres bispinosus Two-spined brittle star (H.L. Clark, 1918) (West Island, South Australia, to Wilsons Promontory, Victoria, and around Tasmania.)
- Ophiura kinbergi Kinberg's brittle star (H.L. Clark, 1918) (Around the Australian mainland and Tasmania. Also widespread in the Indo-West Pacific region.)

=== Class Echinoidea ===
(Sea urchins, heart urchins and sand dollars)

Family Cidaridae

- Goniocidaris tubaria Stumpy pencil urchin (Lamarck, 1816) (Dongara, Western Australia, to Ballina, New South Wales, and around Tasmania.)
- Phyllacanthus irregularis Western slate-pencil urchin (Mortensen, 1928) (Houtman Abrolhos, Western Australia, to Gulf St Vincent, South Australia.)
- Phyllacanthus parvispinus Eastern slate-pencil urchin (Tenison Woods,1879) (Cape Howe, New South Wales, to Moreton Bay, Queensland.)
- Prionocidaris callista Beautiful pencil urchin (Rowe & Hoggett, 1986) (Montague Island, New South Wales, to Bushy Island, Queensland.)

Family Diadematidae

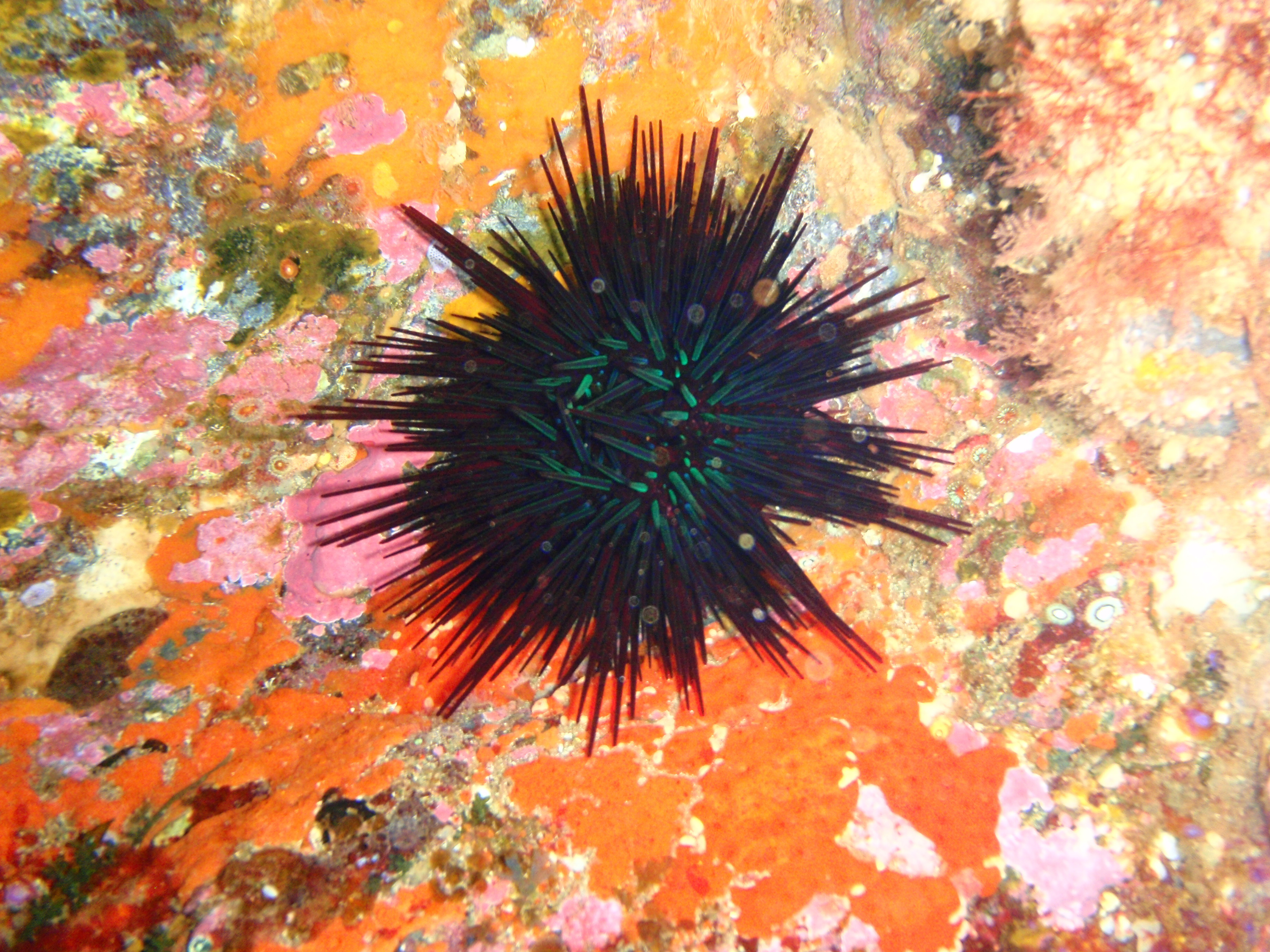
Centrostephanus rodgersii (Hollows-spined sea urchin)

- Centrostephanus rodgersii Hollow-spined urchin, black urchin (Agassiz, 1863) (Cape Everard, Victoria, to Byron Bay, New South Wales, and eastern Tasmania.)
- Centrostephanus tenuispinus Western hollow-spined urchin (H.L. Clark, 1914) (Shark Bay, Western Australia, to Spencer Gulf, South Australia.)
- Diadema palmeri Palmer's urchin (Baker, 1967) (Montague Island to Coffs Harbour, New South Wales. Also New Zealand.)

Family Temnopleuridae

- Amblypneustes sp. 1 Seagrass egg urchin (Furneaux Group, Tasmania.)
- Amblypneustes sp. 2 Purple egg urchin (Eyre Peninsula, South Australia.)
- Amblypneustes sp. 3 White egg urchin (Eyre Peninsula, South Australia.)
- Amblypneustes leucoglobus Pepper egg urchin (Döderlein, 1914) (Geraldton to Eucla, Western Australia.)
- Amblypneustes ovum Egg urchin (Lamarck, 1816) (Spencer Gulf, South Australia, to Cape Liptrap, Victoria, and around Tasmania.)
- Amblypneustes pallidus Yellow-spined egg urchin (Lamarck, 1816) (Houtman Abrolhos, Western Australia, to Port Willunga, South Australia.)
- Holopneustes sp. Red egg urchin (Jurien Bay, Western Australia, to Victor Harbor, South Australia.)
- Holopneustes inflatus Inflated egg urchin (Lütken, 1872) (Victoria to Evans Head, New South Wales, and around Tasmania.)
- Holopneustes porosissimus Carmine-spined egg urchin (Agassiz & Desor, 1846) (Houtman Abrolhos, Western Australia, to Waratah Bay, Victoria, and northern Tasmania.)
- Holopneustes purpurascens Eastern egg urchin (Agassiz, 1872) (Ulladulla to Richmond River, New South Wales.)
- Salmacis belli Bell's urchin (Döderlein, 1902) (Tropical Australia south to Port Walcott, Western Australia, and to Sydney, New South Wales. Also Indonesia.)

Family Toxopneustidae

- Pseudoboletia indiana Indian sea urchin (Michelin, 1862) (Tropical Australia south to Houtman Abrolhos, Western Australia, and to Montague Island, New South Wales. Also Lord Howe Island and widespread in the Indo-West Pacific region.)
- Tripneustes gratilla Sea lamington (Linnaeus, 1758) (Tropical Australia south to Margaret River, Western Australia, and to Montague Island, New South Wales. Also widespread in the Indo-West Pacific region.)

Family Echinometridae

- Echinometra mathaei Pacific urchin (de Blainville, 1825) (Tropical Australia south to Esperance, Western Australia, and to Coffs Harbour, New South Wales. Also Lord Howe Island and widespread in the Indo-west Pacific region.)
- Heliocidaris erythrogramma Purple urchin (Valenciennes, 1846) (Shark Bay, Western Australia, to Caloundra, Queensland, and around Tasmania.)
- Heliocidaris tuberculata Tuberculate urchin (Lamarck, 1816) (Ulladulla, New South Wales, to Caloundra, Queensland. Also Lord Howe Island, Kermadec Islands and New Zealand.)

Family Clypeasteridae

- Clypeaster australasiae Australasian sand dollar (Gray, 1851) (Port Phillip Heads, Victoria, to Bowen, Queensland, and northeastern Tasmania. Also Lord Howe Island and Norfolk Island.)

Family Laganidae

- Peronella leseuri Lesueur's sand dollar (Agassiz, 1841) (Tropical Australia south to Esperance, Western Australia, and to Hervey Bay, Queensland. Also Indonesia, Malaysia, Philippines.)

Family Loveniidae

- Breynia australasiae Australasian heart urchin (Leach, 1815) (Northern Australia south to Sydney, New South Wales. Also Lord Howe Island.)
- Echinocardium cordatum Heart urchin (Pennant, 1777) (Around the Australian mainland and Tasmania. Also in temperate seas worldwide.)

Family Schizasteridae

- Moira lethe Devil's heart urchin (Mortenson, 1930) (Around the Australian mainland and Tasmania. Also widespread in the Indo-West Pacific region.)

Family Brissidae

- Brissus agassizii Agassiz' heart urchin (Döderlein, 1885) (Around mainland Australia but rare on the southern coast. Also widespread in the Indo-West Pacific region.)

=== Class Holothuroidea ===
(Sea cucumbers, holothurians, beche-de-mer)

Family Cucumariidae

- Cercodemas anceps (Selenka, 1867) Red box sea cucumber (Tropical Australia south to Eucla, Western Australia, and to Sydney, New South Wales. Also widespread in the Indo-West Pacific region.)
- Lipotrapeza vestiens (Joshua, 1914) Shellgrit sea cucumber (Perth, Western Australia, to Waratah Bay, Victoria, and northern Tasmania.)
- Neothyonidium dearmatum (Dendy & Hindle, 1907) Sand sea cucumber (Victoria and Tasmania.)
- Plesiocolochirus ignava (Ludwig, 1875) Orange-flecked sea cucumber (Houtman Abrolhos, Western Australia, to Coffs Harbour, New South Wales, and around Tasmania.)

Family Stichopodidae

- Australostichopus mollis (Hutton, 1872) Southern sea cucumber (Houtman Abrolhos, Western Australia, to central New South Wales and around Tasmania. Also New Zealand.)
- Stichopus ludwigi (Erwe, 1913) Ludwig's sea cucumber (Houtman Abrolhos, Western Australia, to South Australia and southeastern Tasmania.)

Family Holothuriidae

- Holothuria hartmeyeri (Erwe, 1913) Hartmeyer's sea cucumber (Houtman Abrolhos, Western Australia, to Gulf St Vincent, South Australia.)

Family Caudinidae

- Paracaudina australis (Semper, 1868) Podgy sea cucumber (Southern Western Australia to Bowen, Queensland, and around Tasmania.)

Family Synaptidae

- Leptosynaptura dolabrifera (Stimpson, 1855) Sticky sea cucumber (Houtman Abrolhos, Western Australia, to southern Queensland and around Tasmania. Also Lord Howe Island.)

Family Chiridotidae

- Chiridota gigas (Dendy & Hindle, 1907) Strawberry sea cucumber (Cape Bridgewater, Victoria, to Shellharbour, New South Wales, and around Tasmania. Also New Zealand.)

== Phylum Hemichordata ==
- Ptychodera flava Yellow acorn worm (Eschscholtz, 1825) (Tropical Australia south to Rottnest Island, Western Australia, Also widespread in the Indo-West Pacific region.)

== Phylum Chordata ==
=== Class Ascidiacea ===
(Ascidians, seasquirts) Family Ascidiidae

- Ascidiella aspersa European ascidian (Mueller, 1776) (Perth to Port Phillip Bay, Victoria, and southeastern Tasmania. Also New Zealand and widespread overseas.)
- Ascidia challengeri Challenger ascidian (Herdman, 1882) (Southern Tasmania. Also Heard Island, Kerguelen Island and Antarctica.)
- Ascidia sydneiensis Sydney ascidian (Stimpson, 1855) (Around the Australian mainland and Tasmania. Also widely distributed overseas.)
- Phallusia obesa Obese ascidian (Herdman, 1880) (Port Hedland, Western Australia, to Cape Melville, Queensland.)

Family Styelidae

- Botrylloides leachi Leach's compound ascidian (Savigny, 1816) (Dampier Archipelago, Western Australia, to Cape Flattery, Queensland, and around Tasmania. Also widespread overseas.)
- Botrylloides magnicoecum Magnificent ascidian (Hartmeyer, 1912) (Shark Bay, Western Australia, to Gladstone, Queensland, and around Tasmania. Also widespread overseas.)
- Botrylloides perspicuus Deadman's fingers (Herdman, 1886) (Dampier Archipelago, Western Australia, to Cape Flattery, Queensland, and around Tasmania. Also widespread in the Indo-West Pacific region.)
- Cnemidocarpa pedata Basal ascidian (Herdman, 1882) (Investigator Group, South Australia, to Townsville, Queensland, and around Tasmania. Also Japan and Philippines.)
- Oculinaria australis Sandy orange ascidian (Gray, 1868) (Fremantle, Western Australia, to Sydney, New South Wales, and around Tasmania.)
- Polyandrocarpa lapidosa Crowded orange ascidian (Herdman, 1891) (Pearson Island, South Australia, to Sydney, New South Wales, and around Tasmania.)
- Polycarpa clavata Club ascidian (Hartmeyer, 1919) (Tropical Australia south to central South Australia and to Cairns, Queensland. Also New Caledonia.)
- Polycarpa viridis Mauve-mouth ascidian (Herdman, 1880) (Perth, Western Australia, to Sydney, New South Wales.)
- Stolonica australis Little orange ascidian (Michaelsen, 1927) (Albany, Western Australia, to Solitary Islands, New South Wales, and around Tasmania.)

Family Pyuridae

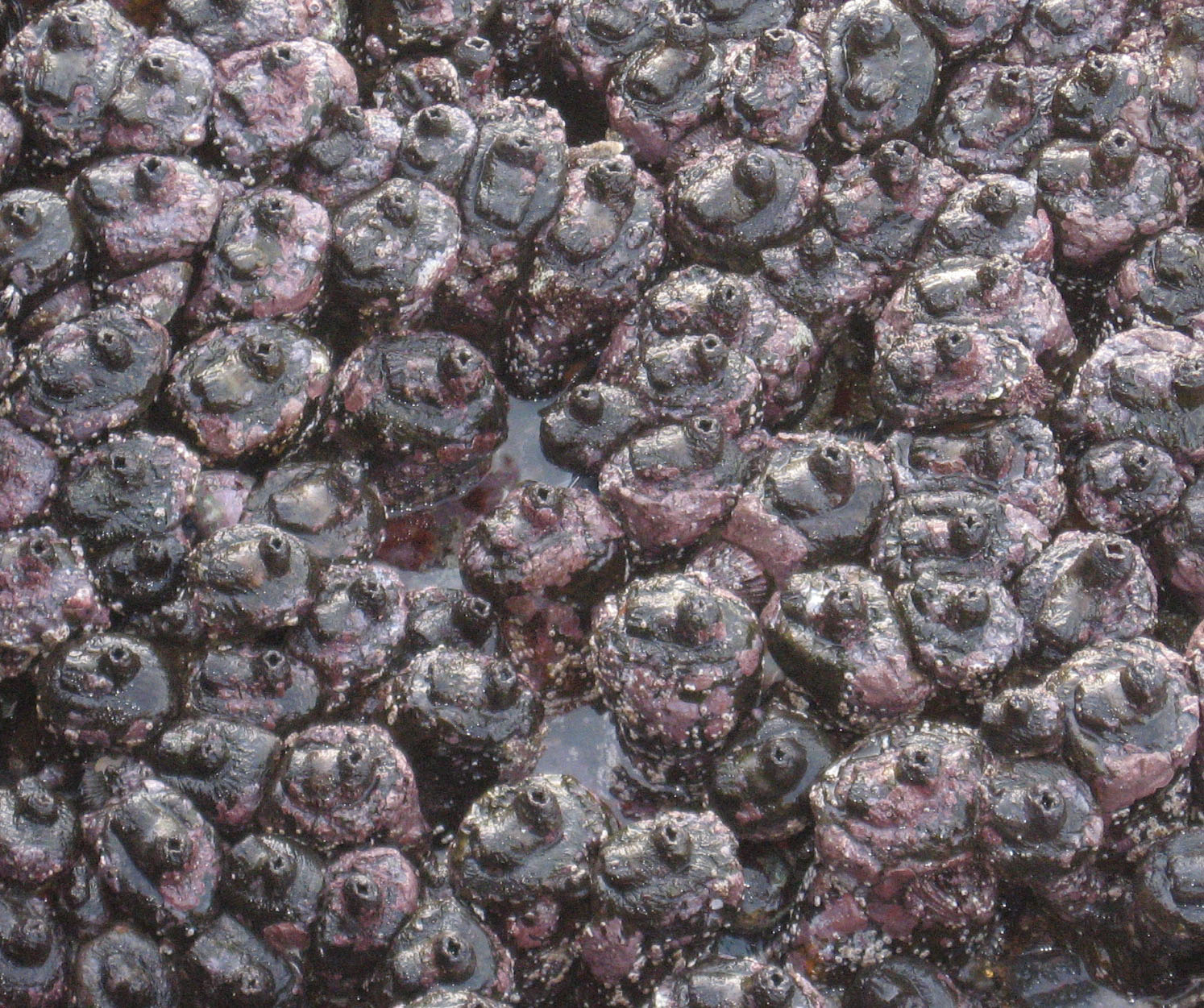
Pyura stolonifera (A field of cunjevoi)

- Herdmania fimbriae Small red-mouthed ascidian (Kott, 2002) (Investigator Group, South Australia, to Bowen, Queensland, and around Tasmania. Also widespread overseas.)
- Herdmania grandis Red-mouthed ascidian (Heller, 1878) (Broome, Western Australia, to Lizard Island, Queensland, and around Tasmania.)
- Pyura australis Southern sea tulip (Quoy & Gaimard, 1834) (Dongara, Western Australia, to Shellharbour, New South Wales, and around Tasmania.)
- Pyura gibbosa Lumpy sea tulip (Heller, 1878) (Perth, Western Australia, to Moreton Bay, Queensland, and around Tasmania.)
- Pyura spinifera Giant sea tulip (Quoy & Gaimard, 1834) (Carnarvon, Western Australia, to Solitary Islands, New South Wales, and Deal Island, Tasmania.)
- Pyura stolonifera Cunjevoi (Heller, 1878) (Shark Bay, Western Australia, to Noosa, Queensland, and around Tasmania. Also widespread in the southern hemisphere.)

Family Diazonidae

- Pseudodiazona claviformis Key-shaped ascidian (Kott, 1963) (Great Australian Bight, South Australia, to Sydney, New South Wales.)

Family Clavelinidae

- Clavelina cylindrica Grape ascidian (Quoy & Gaimard, 1834) (Shark Bay, Western Australia, to Bowen, Queensland, and around Tasmania.)
- Clavelina meridionalis Purple-stalked ascidian (Herdman, 1891) (Tropical Australia south to Houtman Abrolhos, Western Australia, and to Sydney, New South Wales. Also Indonesia.)
- Clavelina molluccensis Molluccan stalked ascidian (Sluiter, 1904) (Around Aust. Also widespread in the Indo-West Pacific region.)
- Clavelina ostrearum Blue vase ascidian (Michaelson, 1930) (Albany, Western Australia, to Pearson Island, South Australia.)
- Clavelina pseudobaudinensis Blue-flecked ascidian (Kott, 1976) (Houtman Abrolhos, Western Australia, to Jervis Bay, New South Wales, and around Tasmania. Also Lord Howe Island.)

Family Clavelinidae

- Pycnoclavella aurantia Golden ascidian (Kott, 1990) (Busselton, Western Australia, to Port Lincoln, South Australia.)
- Pycnoclavella diminuta Diminutive ascidian (Kott, 1957) (Tropical Australia south to Gulf St Vincent, South Australia, and to southern Queensland. Also Lord Howe Island, Philippines and New Caledonia.)

Family Holozoidae

- Neodistoma mammillatum Yellow cushion ascidian (Kott, 1990) (Investigator Group to Seacliff, South Australia, and Deal Island, Tasmania.)
- Sigillina australis Southern ascidian (Savigny, 1816) (Montebello Island, Western Australia, to Port Stephens (New South Wales), but absent from Victoria. Also New Zealand.)
- Sigillina cyanea Cyan ascidian (Herdman, 1899) (Tropical Australia south to Albany, Western Australia, and to Sydney, New South Wales. Also Indonesia.)
- Sycozoa cerebriformis Brain ascidian (Quoy & Gaimard, 1834) (Shark Bay, Western Australia, to Mooloolaba, Queensland, and around Tasmania.)
- Sycozoa murrayi Murray's ascidian (Herdman, 1886) (Dongara, Western Australia, to Sydney, New South Wales, and around Tasmania.)
- Sycozoa pedunculata Noddy ascidian (Quoy & Gaimard, 1834) (Perth, Western Australia, to Western Port, Victoria, and around Tasmania.)
- Sycozoa pulchra Tulip ascidian (Herdman, 1886) (Dongara, Western Australia, to Torres Strait, Queensland, and around Tasmania. Also Indonesia.)

Family Polycitoridae

- Cystodytes dellachiajei Gelatinous ascidian (Della Valle, 1877) (Around the Australian mainland and Tasmania. Also widespread overseas.)
- Polycitor giganteus Giant jelly ascidian (Herdman, 1899) (Port Hedland, Western Australia, to Mooloolaba, Queensland, and Flinders Island, Tasmania.)

Family Polyclinidae

- Aplidium brevilarvacium Puffball ascidian (Kott, 1963) (Cape Naturaliste, Western Australia, to Investigator Group, South Australia.)
- Aplidium clivosum Red crater ascidian (Kott, 1992) (Port Hedland, Western Australia, to Heron Island, Queensland, but not recorded from Victoria.)
- Aplidium multiplicatum Sluiter's compound ascidian (Sluiter, 1909) (Tropical Australia south to Gulf St Vincent, South Australia, and to Jervis Bay, New South Wales.)
- Synoicum citrum Lemon ascidian (Kott, 1992) (Port MacDonnell, South Australia, to Wilsons Promontory, Victoria, and around Tasmania.)
- Synoicum sacculum Red compound ascidian (Kott, 1992) (Elliston, South Australia, to Flinders, Victoria, and around Tasmania.)

Family Ritterellidae

- Ritterella pedunculata Encrusted moss ascidian (Herdman, 1899) (Great Australian Bight, South Australia, to Arrawarra, New South Wales, and around Tasmania.)

Family Didemnidae

- Didemnum incanum Pink encrusting ascidian (Herdman, 1899) (Cape Naturaliste, Western Australia, to Sydney, New South Wales, and around Tasmania. Also New Zealand.)
- Didemnum lissoclinum Spongy compound ascidian (Kott, 2001) (Dunsborough, Western Australia, to Jervis Bay, New South Wales.)

=== Class Thaliacea ===
(Salps, thaliaceans)

- Pegea confoederata Finger trap salp (Forsskål, 1775) (Around the Australian mainland and Tasmania. Also widespread overseas.)
- Pyrosoma atlanticum Atlantic salp (Peron, 1804) (Western Australia to southern Queensland and around Tasmania. Also widespread overseas.)
- Salpa fusiformis Torpedo salp (Chamisso, 1819) (Around the Australian mainland and Tasmania. Also widespread overseas.)

=== Class Larvacea ===
(Appendicularians, larvaceans)

- Oikopleura sp, Tasmanian appendicularian (Tasmania.)

=== Class Cephalaspidomorphi ===
Family Petromyzontidae – Lampreys

- Geotria australis (Gray, 1851) Pouch lamprey (Moore river, Western Australia toLakes entrance, Victoria, and around Tasmania. Also New Zealand and South America.)

=== Class Chondrichthyes ===
Family Heterodontidae – Hornsharks, Port Jackson sharks, bullhead sharks.

- Heterodontus galeatus Crested hornshark, crested Port Jackson shark (Günther, 1870) (Batemans Bay, New South Wales to Cape Moreton, Queensland)
- Heterodontus portusjacksoni Port Jackson shark (Meyer, 1793) (Houtman Abrolhos, Western Australia to Byron Bay, New South Wales, and around Tasmania)

Family Parascylliidae – Collar carpetsharks, collared catsharks

- Parascyllium ferrugineum Rusty catshark, rusty carpetshark (McCulloch, 1917) (Albany, Western Australia toGabo Island, Victoria, and around Tasmania)
- Parascyllium variolatum Varied catshark, varied carpetshark (Dumeril, 1853) (Dongara, Western Australia to Lakes Entrance, Victoria, and King Island, Tasmania)

Family Scyliorhinidae – Catsharks

- Cephaloscyllium laticeps Draughtboard shark, swell shark (Dumeril, 1853) (Recherche Archipelago, Western Australia, to Jervis Bay, New South Wales, and around Tasmania)

Family Orectolobidae – Wobbegongs

- Orectolobus halei Banded wobbegong, ornate wobbegong (Whitley, 1940) (Ningaloo, Western Australia to Southport, Queensland and Flinders Island, Tasmania)
- Orectolobus maculatus Spotted wobbegong (Bonnaterre, 1788) (Fremantle, Western Australia to Moreton Island, Queensland)

Family Odontaspididae

- Carcharias taurus Grey nurse shark (Rafinesque, 1810) (Around the Australian mainland, also widespread overseas)

Family Squalidae – Dogfishes

- Squalus acanthias Whitespotted dogfish (Linnaeus, 1758) (Southwestern Western Australia to Victoria and around Tasmania. Also widespread overseas.)

Family Lamnidae – Makos, Mackerel sharks

- Carcharodon carcharias White shark, great white shark, white pointer (Linnaeus 1758) (North West Cape, Western Australia to southern Queensland and around Tasmania. Also widespread overseas.)

Family Triakidae – Houndsharks

- Mustelus antarcticus Gummy shark (Günther, 1870) (Shark Bay, Western Australia to Port Stephens (New South Wales), and around Tasmania)

Family Carcharhinidae – Whaler sharks

- Carcharhinus brachyurus Bronze whaler (Günther,1870) (Jurien Bay, Western Australia to Coffs Harbour, New South Wales, and northern Tasmania)

Family Squatinidae – Angelsharks

- Squatina australis Australian angelshark (Regan, 1906) (Rottnest Island, Western Australia to Port Stephens (New South Wales) and northern Tasmania)

Family Rhinobatidae – Guitarfishes

- Aptychotrema rostrata Eastern shovelnose ray (Shaw and Nodder, 1794) (Jervis Bay, New South Wales to Moreton Bay, Queensland)
- Aptychotrema vincentiana Western shovelnose ray (Haake, 1885) (Port Hedland, Western Australia to Wilsons Promontory, Victoria, and Kent group, Tasmania)
- Trygonorrhina fasciata Fiddler ray, banjo ray (Mueller and Henle, 1841) (Eden, New South Wales to southern Queensland)

Family Hypnidae – Coffin rays, electric rays

- Hypnos Monopterygium Coffin ray (Shaw and Nodder, 1795) (Broome, Western Australia to Caloundra, Queensland)

Family Narcinidae – Numbfishes

- Narcine tasmaniensis Tasmanian numbfish (Richardson, 1840) (Beachport, South Australia to Coffs Harbour, New South Wales, and around Tasmania.)

Family Rajidae – Skates

- Dentiraja lemprieri Thornback skate (Richardson, 1845) (Beachport, South Australia to Jervis Bay, New South Wales, and around Tasmania.)
- Dipturus whitleyi Melbourne skate, Whitley's skate (Iredale, 1938) (Albany, Western Australia to Wollagong, New South Wales and around Tasmania)

Family Dasyatidae – Stingrays

- Dasyatis brevicaudata Smooth stingray (Hutton, 1875) (Shark Bay, Western Australia to Maroochydore, Queensland, and around Tasmania. Also New Zealand and Southern Africa.)

Family Myliobatidae – Eagle rays

- Myliobatis australis Southern eagle ray (Macleay, 1881) (Jurien Bay, Western Australia to Moreton Bay, Queensland, and around Tasmania.)
- Trygonoptera imitata Eastern shovelnose stingaree (Yearsley, Last and Gomon, 2008) (Beachport, South Australia to Jervis Bay, New South Wales)
- Western stingaree Trygonoptera mucosa (Whitley, 1939) (Dongara, Western Australia to Port Phillip Bay, Victoria)
- Trygonoptera ovalis Striped stingaree (Last and Gomon, 1987) (Houtman Abrolhos to Eucla, Western Australia)

Family Urolophidae – Stingarees

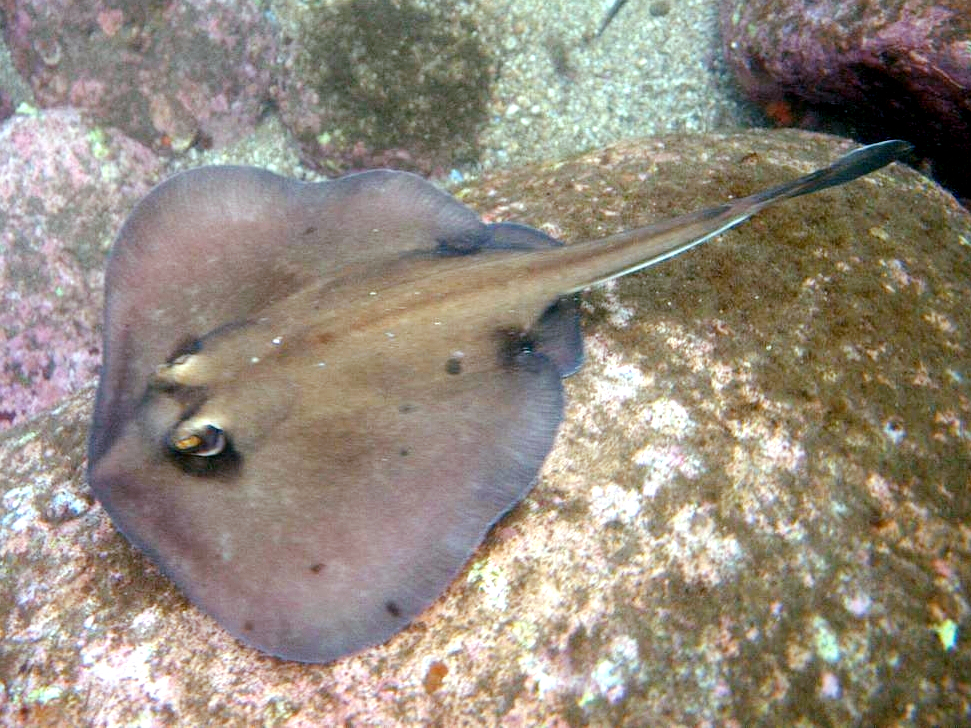
Urolophus kapalensis (Kapala stingaree)

- Urolophus cruciatus Banded stingaree (Lacepede, 1804) (Beachport, South Australia to Tathra, New South Wales, and around Tasmania.)
- Urolophus gigas Spotted stingaree (Scott, 1954) (Albany, Western Australia to Lakes entrance, Victoria and northern Tasmania)
- Urolophus kapalensis Kapala stingaree (Yearsley and Last, 2006) (Disaster Bay, New South Wales to Cape Moreston, Queensland.)
- Urolophus paucimaculatus Sparsely-spotted stingaree (Dixon, 1969) (Lancelin, Western Australia to Crowdy Head, New South Wales, and around Tasmania.)

=== Class Osteichthyes ===
Family Muraenidae – Moray eels

- Gymnothorax obesus Speckled moray (New South Wales coast)
- Gymnothorax prasinus Green moray (Richardson, 1848) (Shark Bay, Western Australia to southern Queensland and south to Maria Island, Tasmania. Also New Zealand)

Family Congridae – Conger eels

- Conger verrauxi Southern conger eel (Kaup, 1856) (Beachport, South Australia to eastern Victoria and around Tasmania)
- Conger wilsoni Eastern conger, short-finned conger eel (Bloch and Schneider, 1801) (Geraldton, Western Australia to Kangaroo Island, South Australia, and Bermagui New South Wales to southern Queensland. Also New Zealand and southern Africa.)

Family Ophichthidae – Snake eels, worm eels

- Ophisurus serpens Serpent eel (Linnaeus, 1758) (Lancelin, Western Australia to Noosa river Queensland, and northeastern Tasmania. Also widespread overseas.)
- Scolecenchelys breviceps Shorthead worm eel (Günther, 1876) (Rottnest Island, Western Australia to Victoria and around Tasmania. Also New Zealand)

Family Anguillidae – Freshwater eels

- Anguilla australis Southern shortfin eel (Richardson, 1841) (Bremer River, South Australia to Brisbane River, Queensland, and around Tasmania. Also New Zealand.)
- Anguilla reinhardtii Longfin eel (Steindachner, 1867) (Melbourne, Victoria to Cape York, Queensland, and northern and eastern Tasmania. Also Lord Howe Island and New Caledonia.)

Family Clupeidae – Herrings, pilchards, sardines

- Hyperlophus vittatus Sandy sprat (Castelnau, 1875) (Kalbarri, Western Australia to Moreton Bay, Queensland)
- Sardinops sagax Australian sardine (Steindachner, 1879) syn. Sardinops neopilchardus (Cape Cuvier, Western Australia to Rockhampton, Queensland, and northern and eastern Tasmania. Also New Zealand)

Family Engraulidae – Anchovies

- Engraulis australis Australian anchovy (Shaw, 1790) (Kalbarri Western Australia to Heron Island, Queensland. Also Lord Howe Island and New Zealand.)

Family Salmonidae – Salmons, trouts

- Salmo trutta Brown trout (Linnaeus, 1758) (Southwestern Western Australia to New South Wales and around Tasmania. Also widely distributed overseas)

Family Galaxiidae – Galaxias, mountain trout, native trout

- Galaxias maculatus Common galaxias, jollytail, native trout (Jenyns, 1842) (Albany, Western Australia to southern Queensland and around Tasmania. Also Lord Howe Island. New Zealand and South America.)
- Galaxias truttaceous Trout galaxias, spotted galaxias, mountain trout (Valenciennes, 1846) (Albany, Western Australia and Otway Ranges to Lakes Entrance, Victoria, and around Tasmania)

Family Aplochitonidae – Whitebait

- Lovettia sealii Tasmanian whitebait (Johnston, 1883) (Around Tasmania)

Family Prototroctidae – Southern graylings

- Prototroctes maraena Australian grayling, cucumber fish (Günther, 1864) (Port MacDonnell, South Australia to Nowra, New South Wales and around Tasmania)

Family Aulopodidae – Threadsails

- Aulopus purpurissatus Sergeant baker (Richardson, 1843) (Coral Bay Western Australia to Laguna Bay, Queensland and northern Tasmania.)

Family Synodontidae – Lizardfishes

- Synodus variegatus Variegated lizardfish (Lacepede, 1803) (Tropical Australia south to Jutten Bay, Western Australia and Merimbula, New South Wales. Also Lord Howe Island and widespread in the Indo-Pacific region)

Family Gonorhynchidae – Beaked salmon

- Gonorhynchus greyi Beaked salmon (Richardson,1845) (Shark Bay, Western Australia to southern Queensland and around Tasmania)

Family Plotosidae – Eeltail catfishes

- Cnidoglanis macrocephalus Estuary cobbler, cobbler, estuary catfish (Valenciennes, 1840) (Houtman Abrolhos, Western Australia to southern Queensland and around Tasmania)
- Plotosus lineatus Striped catfish (Thunberg, 1791) (Tropical Australia south to Esperance, Western Australia, and to Sydney New South Wales. Also widespread in the Indo-West Pacific region)

Family Batrachoididae – Frogfishes

- Batrachomoeus dubius Eastern frogfish (Shaw, 1790) (Central New South Wales to Hervey Bay, Queensland)
- Batrachomoeus rubricephalus Pinkhead frogfish (Hutchins, 1976) (Houtman Abrolhos to Eucla, Western Australia)

Family Antennariidae – Anglerfishes

- Antennarius striatus Striate anglerfish, striped anglerfish (Shaw and Nodder 1794) (Tropical Australia south to Wollagong, New South Wales and Geraldton Western Australia)
- Echinophryne crassispina Prickly anglerfish (McCulloch and White, 1910) (Albany, WEA to Jervis Bay, New South Wales and northern Tasmania)
- Rhycherus filamentosus Tasselled anglerfish (Castelnau, 1872) (Gulf St Vincent, South Australia to Lakes Entrance, Victoria and northern Tasmania)

Family Brachionichthyidae – Handfishes

- Brachionichthys hirsutus Spotted handfish (Lacepede, 1804) (Derwent estuary and D'Entrecasteaux Channel, Tasmania)
- Sympterichthys sp. Ziebell's handfish, Loney's handfish (Cox's Bight to Tasman Peninsula, Tasmania)
- Sympterichthys verrucosus Warty handfish (McCulloch and White, 1918) (Gulf St Vincent, South Australia to Mallacoota, Victoria)

Family Gobiesocidae – Clingfishes, shore eels

- Alabes dorsalis Common shore eel (Richardson, 1845) (Southern Western Australia to southern Queensland and around Tasmania.)
- Aspasmogaster tasmaniensis Tasmanian clingfish (Günther, 1861) (Southern Western Australia to Victoria and around Tasmania.)
- Cochleoceps bicolor Western cleaner clingfish (Hutchins, 1991) (Southern Western Australia to Port Phillip Bay, Victoria)

Family Moridae – Morid cods

- Lotella rhacinus Largetooth beardie, beardie (Bloch and Schneider, 1801) (Lancelin, Western Australia to Byron Bay, New South Wales, and around Tasmania. Also New Zealand)
- Pseudophycis bachus Red cod (Forster, 1801) (Coffin bay, SE to Wilson's Promontory, Victoria, and around Tasmania. Also New Zealand.)
- Pseudophycis barbata Bearded rock cod (Geunther, 1863) (Rottnest Island, Western Australia to Sydney, New South Wales and around Tasmania.)

Family Ophidiidae – Cusk eels, lings

- Genypterus tigerinus Rock ling (Klunzinger, 1872) (Garden Island, Western Australia to Newcastle, New South Wales and around Tasmania)

Family Hemiramphidae – Garfishes, halfbeaks

- Hyporhamphus melanochir Southern garfish (Valenciennes, 1846) (Lancelin, Western Australia to eastern Victoria and around Tasmania.)

Family Atherinidae – Hardyheads, silversides

- Atherinason hepsetoides Smallscale hardyhead, deepwater hardyhead (Richardson, 1843) (Kangaroo Island, South Australia to Sydney, New South Wales and around Tasmania)
- Atherinomorus vaigensis Common hardyhead, Ogilvy's hardyhead (Quoy and Gaimard, 1825) (Exmouth, Western Australia to Southern Western Australia and Merimbula, New South Wales to Queensland.)
- Kestatherina esox Pikehead hardyhead (Klunzinger, 1872) (Kangaroo island, South Australia to Western Port, Victoria, and around Tasmania)
- Leptatherina presbyteroides Silverfish, prettyfish, Tamar hardyhead (Richardson, 1843) (Houtman Abrolhos, Western Australia to southern New South Wales and around Tasmania.)

Family Monocentridae – Pineapplefishes

- Cleidopus gloriamaris Australian pineapplefish, knightfish (De Vis, 1882) (Shark Bay, Western Australia to Great Australian Bight, Western Australia and Eden, New South Wales to Capricorn Group, Queensland.)

Family Trachichthyidae – Roughies, sawbellies

- Optivus agastos Violet roughy (Gomon, 2004) (Port Phillip Bay, Victoria to Noosa, Queensland and eastern Tasmania south to Freycinet Peninsula.)
- Paratrachichthys sp. Sandpaper fish (Perth, Western Australia to Port Stephens (New South Wales) and northern Tasmania.)
- Trachichthys australis Southern roughy (Shaw and Nodder, 1799) (Kalbarri, Western Australia to southern Queensland)

Family Berycidae – Alfonsinos, Red snapper

- Centroberyx affinis Redfish, nannygai (Günther, 1859) (Eastern Victoria to Newcastle, New South Wales and northeastern Tasmania. Also New Zealand.)
- Centroberyx lineatus Swallowtail (Cuvier, 1829) (Lancelin, Western Australia to Bermagui, New South Wales)
- Centroberyx gerrardi Bight redfish, red snapper (Günther, 1887) (Lancelin, Western Australia to Wilson's Promontory, Victoria and northern Tasmania.)

Family Zeidae – Dories

- Zeus faber John dory (Linnaeus, 1758) (Port Hedland, Western Australia to Queensland and around Tasmania. Also widespread overseas.)

Family Syngnathidae – Pipefishes, pipehorses, seahorses, seadragons

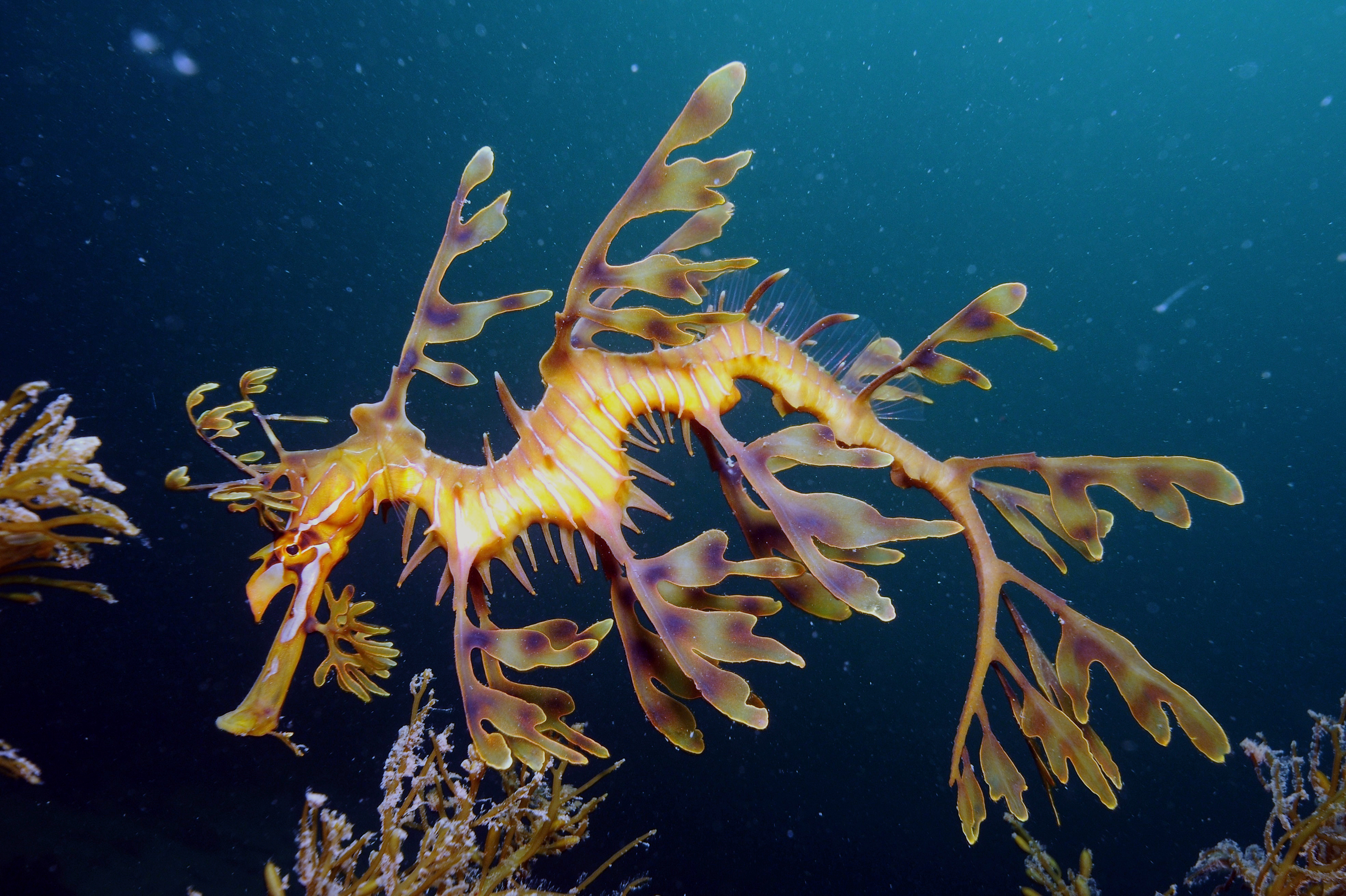
Phycodurus eques (Leafy seadragon)

- Festucalex cinctus (Ramsay, 1882) Girdled pipefish (Tropical Australia south to Sydney, New South Wales.)
- Filicampus tigris (Castelnau, 1879) Tiger pipefish (Broome, Western Australia to Spencer Gulf, South Australia, and Sydney, New South Wales to Moreton Bay, Queensland)
- Heraldia nocturnia (Paxton, 1975) Upside down pipefish (Geographe Bay, Western Australia to Seal Rocks, New South Wales, and around Tasmania)
- Hippocampus abdominalus Lesson, 1827 Bigbelly seahorse (Eden to Newcastle, New South Wales)
- Hippocampus bleekeri (Fowler, 1907) Potbelly seahorse (Great Australian Bight, South Australia to Lakes Entrance, Victoria, and around Tasmania)
- Hippocampus breviceps Peters, 1870 Shorthead seahorse (Spencer Gulf, South Australia to Wilson's Promontory, Victoria, and northern and eastern Tasmania)
- Hippocampus subelongatus Castelnau, 1873 West Australian seahorse (Kalbarri to Cape Naturaliste, Western Australia)
- Hippocampus whitei (Bleeker, 1855) White's seahorse (Narooma to Newcastle, New South Wales)
- Phycodurus eques (Günther,1865) Leafy seadragon (Lancelin, Western Australia to Wilson's Promontory, Victoria)
- Phyllopteryx taeniolatus (Lacepede, 1804) Common seadragon, weedy seadragon (Geraldton, Western Australia to Port Stephens (New South Wales), and around Tasmania)
- Solegnathus spinosissimus (Günther, 1870) Spiny pipehorse (Victoria, southern New South Wales and around Tasmania)
- Stigmatopora argus (Richardson, 1840) Spotted pipefish (Shark Bay, Western Australia to Sydney, New South Wales and around Tasmania.)
- Stigmatopora nigra (Kaup, 1856) Widebody pipefish (Rottnest Island Western Australia to Tangalooma, Queensland and around Tasmania. Also New Zealand.)
- Vanacampus phillipi (Lucas, 1891) Port Philip pipefish (Perth, Western Australia to southern New South Wales and around Tasmania.)

Family Pegasidae – Seamoths, dragonfishes

- Pegasus lancifer Sculptured seamoth (Kaup, 1861) (Great Australian Bight, Western Australia to Lakes Entrance, Victoria, and around Tasmania.)
- Pegasus volitans Slender seamoth (Linnaeus, 1758) (Tropical Australia south to Cockburn Sound, Western Australia, and to Bermagui, New South Wales)

Family Ambassidae – Glassfishes

- Ambassis jacksoniensis Port Jackson glassfish (Macleay, 1881) (Southern New South Wales to southern Queensland)

Family Scorpaenidae – Scorpionfishes

- Platycephalus caeruleopunctatus Bluespotted flathead (McCulloch, 1922) (Lakes Entrance, Victoria, to Moreton Bay, Queensland.)
- Scorpaena cardinalis Eastern red scorpionfish, red rock cod (Richardson, 1842) (Eastern Victoria to Noosa, Queensland. Also New Zealand)
- Scorpaena sumptuosa Western red scorpionfish (Castelnau, 1875) (Point Quobba to Esperance, Western Australia.)

Family Pteroididae – Lionfishes

- Dendrochirus brachypterus Dwarf lionfish (Cuvier, 1829) (Tropical Australia south to Houtman Abrolhos, Western Australia, and to Montague Island, New South Wales. Also widespread in the Indo-West Pacific region.)
- Pterois volitans Common lionfish (Linnaeus, 1758) (Tropical Australia south to Fremantle, Western Australia, and to Montague Island, New South Wales. Also widespread in the Indo-West Pacific region, and introduced into the North Atlantic.)

Family Tetrarogidae – Fortescues, waspfishes

- Centropogon australis Eastern fortescue (White, 1790) (Lakes Entrance, Victoria, to Hervey Bay, Queensland.)
- Glyptauchen panduratus Goblinfish (Richardson, 1850) (Rottnest Island, Western Australia, to Sydney, New South Wales, and around Tasmania.)
- Gymnapistes marmoratus Soldierfish, cobbler (Cuvier, 1829) (Fremantle, Western Australia, to Sydney, New South Wales, and around Tasmania.)

Family Neosebastidae – Gurnard perches, gurnard scorpionfishes

- Maxillicosta scabriceps Little gurnard perch (Whitley, 1935) (Exmouth Gulf, Western Australia, to Western Port, Victoria, and south to Tinderbox, Tasmania.)
- Neosebastes pandus Bighead gurnard perch (Richardson, 1842) (Houtman Abrolhos, Western Australia, to Gulf St Vincent, South Australia.)
- Neosebastes scorpaenoides Common gurnard perch (Guichenot, 1842) (Ceduna, South Australia, to Sydney, New South Wales, and around Tasmania.)

Family Sebastidae – Rockfishes

- Helicolenus percoides Reef ocean perch, red gurnard perch, sea perch (Richardson, 1842) (Albany, Western Australia, to Newcastle, New South Wales, and around Tasmania. Also New Zealand.)

Family Triglidae – Sea robins, gurnards

- Lepidotrigla papilio Spiny gurnard (Cuvier, 1829) (Perth, Western Australia, to eastern Victoria and around Tasmania.)
- Lepidotrigla pleuracanthica Eastern spiny gurnard (Richardson, 1845) (Eastern Victoria to southern Queensland.)
- Lepidotrigla vanessa Butterfly gurnard, cocky gurnard (Richardson, 1839) (Great Australian Bight, Western Australia, to Newcastle, New South Wales, and around Tasmania.)
- Pterygotrigla polyommata Latchet, sharp-beaked gurnard (Richardson, 1839) (Rottnest Island, Western Australia, to southern New South Wales and around Tasmania.)

Family Pataecidae – Prowfishes

- Aetapcus maculatus Warty prowfish (Günther, 1861) (Shark Bay, Western Australia, to Wilsons Promontory, Victoria, and south to Maria Island, Tasmania.)
- Pataecus fronto Red Indian fish (Richardson, 1844) (Exmouth, Western Australia, to southern Queensland.)

Family Gnathanacanthidae – Red velvetfishes

- Gnathanacanthus goetzeei Red velvetfish (Bleeker, 1855) (Jurien Bay, Western Australia, to Wilsons Promontory, Victoria, and around Tasmania.)

Family Aploactinidae – Velvetfishes

- Aploactisoma milesii Southern velvetfish (Richardson, 1850) (Shark Bay, Western Australia, to Sydney, New South Wales, and northern Tasmania.)

Family Platycephalidae – Flatheads

- Inegocia japonica Rusty Flathead (Tilesius, 1812) (Tropical Australia south to Fremantle, Western Australia. Also widespread in the Indo-West Pacific region.)
- Laeviprora inops Longhead flathead (Jenyns, 1840) (Shark Bay, Western Australia, to Kangaroo Island, South Australia.)
- Onigocia spinosa Midget flathead, spiny flathead (Temminck & Schlegel, 1842) (Tropical Australia south to Cockburn Sound, Western Australia. Also widespread in the Indo-West Pacific region.)
- Platycephalus bassensis Southern sand flathead (Cuvier, 1829) (Bremer Bay, Western Australia, to Jervis Bay, New South Wales, and around Tasmania.)
- Platycephalus endrachtensis Yellowtail flathead, bar-tailed flathead (Quoy & Gaimard, 1824) (Tropical Australia south to Fremantle, Western Australia, and to Port Hacking, New South Wales.)
- Platycephalus fuscus Dusky flathead (Cuvier, 1829) (Wilsons Promontory, Victoria, to Mackay, Queensland.)
- Platycephalus laevigatus Rock flathead, grass flathead (Cuvier, 1829) (Geographe Bay, Western Australia, to Nowra, New South Wales, and around Tasmania.)
- Platycephalus longispinis Longspine flathead (Macleay, 1884) (Carnarvon, Western Australia, to western South Australia, and Lakes Entrance, Victoria, to Moreton Bay, Queensland.)
- Platycephalus speculator Southern bluespotted flathead, yank flathead, Castelnau's flathead (Klunzinger, 1872) (Kalbarri, Western Australia, to eastern Victoria and northern Tasmania.)
- Neoplatycephalus richardsoni Tiger flathead (Castelnau, 1872) (Victoria to Sydney, New South Wales, and around Tasmania.)
- Thysanophrys cirronasus Tasselsnout flathead, rock flathead (Richardson, 1848) (Lancelin, Western Australia, to eastern South Australia and Montague Island, New South Wales, to Caloundra, Queensland.)

Family Congiopodidae – Pigfishes

- Congiopodus leucopaecilus Southern pigfish, whitenose pigfish (Richardson, 1846) (Jurien Bay, Western Australia, to St Vincent Gulf, South Australia.)

Family Serranidae – Rockcods, seaperches

- Acanthistius cinctus Yellowbanded wirrah (Günther, 1859) (Merimbula to Solitary Islands, New South Wales. Also Lord Howe Island, Norfolk Island and New Zealand.)
- Acanthistius ocellatus Eastern wirrah, old boot (Günther, 1859) (Eastern Victoria to southern Queensland and northeastern Tasmania. Also Lord Howe Island.)
- Acanthistius serratus Western wirrah (Cuvier, 1828) (Shark Bay, Western Australia, to Ceduna, South Australia.)
- Caesioperca sp. Red-lined perch (Rottnest Island to Cape Leeuwin, Western Australia.)
- Caesioperca lepidoptera Butterfly perch (Bloch & Schneider, 1801) (Albany, Western Australia, to Byron Bay, New South Wales, and around Tasmania. Also New Zealand.)
- Caesioperca rasor Barber perch (Richardson, 1839) (Albany, Western Australia, to Wilsons Promontory, Victoria, and around Tasmania.)
- Epinephelides armatus Breaksea cod, black-arse cod, tiger cod (Castelnau, 1875) (Shark Bay to Recherche Archipelago, Western Australia.)
- Epinephelus daemelii Black rockcod (Günther, 1876) (Cape Conran, Victoria, to Townsville, Queensland)
- Epinephelus rivulatus Chinaman rockcod (Valenciennes, 1830) (Kimberleys to Rottnest Island, Western Australia.)
- Hypoplectrodes annulatus Blackbanded seaperch, yellow-banded seaperch (Günther, 1859) (Wilsons Promontory, Victoria, to southern Queensland.)
- Hypoplectrodes maccullochi Halfbanded seaperch (Whitley, 1929) (Wilsons Promontory, Victoria, to Byron Bay, New South Wales, and south to Bicheno, Tasmania.)
- Hypoplectrodes nigroruber Banded seaperch (Cuvier, 1828) (Kalbarri, Western Australia, to The Entrance, New South Wales, and northern Tasmania.)
- Othos dentex Harlequin fish (Cuvier, 1828) (Jurien Bay, Western Australia, to Victor Harbor, South Australia.)

Family Callanthiidae – Rosy perches

- Callanthius australis Splendid perch, rosy perch (Ogilby, 1899) (Shark Bay, Western Australia, to Port Macquarie, New South Wales, and around Tasmania.)

Family Plesiopidae – Prettyfins, blue devilfishes, hulafishes

- Paraplesiops bleekeri Eastern blue devil (Günther, 1861) (Montague Island, New South Wales, to Gold Coast, Queensland.)
- Paraplesiops meleagris Southern blue devil, western blue devil (Peters, 1869) (Houtman Abrolhos, Western Australia, to Port Phillip Bay, Victoria.)
- Trachinops brauni Bluelined hulafish, Brauns hulafish (Allen, 1977) (Houtman Abrolhos to Recherche Archipelago, Western Australia.)
- Trachinops caudimaculatus Southern hulafish, blotched-tailed trachinops (McCoy, 1890) (Investigator Group, South Australia, to Wilsons Promontory, Victoria, and around Tasmania.)
- Trachinops noarlungae Yellowhead hulafish, Noarlunga hulafish (Glover, 1974) (Houtman Abrolhos, Western Australia, to Gulf St Vincent, South Australia.)
- Trachinops taeniatus Eastern hulafish (Günther, 1861) (Cape Conran, Victoria, to Noosa, Queensland.)

Family Pseudochromidae – Dottybacks

- Labracinus lineata Lined dottyback (Castelnau, 1875) (Tropical Australia south to Jurien Bay, Western Australia. Also widespread in the Indo-West Pacific region.)

Family Glaucosomatidae – Pearl perches

- Glaucosoma hebraicum West Australian dhufish, Westralian jewfish, jewie (Richardson, 1845) (Beagle Island to Recherche Archipelago, Western Australia.)
- Glaucosoma scapulare Pearl perch (Ramsay, 1881) (Sydney, New South Wales, to Yeppoon, Queensland.)

Family Terapontidae – Striped grunters

- Pelates sexlineatus Eastern striped grunter, eastern striped trumpeter (Quoy & Gaimard, 1824) (Narooma, New South Wales, to southern Queensland.)
- Pelates octolineatus Western striped trumpeter, striped perch, shitty (Jenyns, 1842) (Broome, Western Australia, to Gulf St Vincent, South Australia.)
- Pelsartia humeralis Sea trumpeter (Ogilby, 1899) (Houtman Abrolhos, Western Australia, to Kangaroo Island, South Australia.)

Family Apogonidae – Cardinalfishes, gobbleguts

- Apogon limenus Sydney cardinalfish (Randall & Hoese, 1988) (Merimbula, New South Wales, to Yeppoon, Queensland.)
- Apogon rueppellii Western gobbleguts (Günther, 1859) (Arnhem Land, NT, to Albany, Western Australia.)
- Apogon victoriae Western striped cardinalfish, red-striped cardinalfish (Günther, 1859) (Shark Bay to Cape Leeuwin, Western Australia.)
- Siphamia cephalotesWood's siphonfish (Castelnau, 1875) (Shark Bay, Western Australia, to southern Queensland.)
- Vincentia conspersa Southern cardinalfish (Klunzinger, 1872) (Ceduna, South Australia, to Wilsons Promontory, Victoria, and around Tasmania.)
- Vincentia punctata Orange cardinalfish (Klunzinger, 1879) (Rottnest Island, Western Australia, to Kangaroo Island, South Australia.)

Family Dinolestidae – Longfin pike

- Dinolestes lewini (Griffith, 1834) Longfin pike (Rottnest Island, Western Australia, to Port Macquarie, New South Wales, and around Tasmania.)

Family Sillaginidae – Whitings

- Sillago flindersi McKay, 1985 Eastern school whiting (Wilsons Promontory, Victoria, to Moreton Bay, Queensland, and eastern Tasmania.)
- Sillago maculata Quoy & Gaimard, 1824 Trumpeter whiting, winter whiting (Tropical Australia south to Geographe Bay, Western Australia, and to Narooma, New South Wales.)
- Sillaginodes punctata (Cuvier, 1829) King George whiting, spotted whiting, South Australian whiting (Jurien Bay, Western Australia, to northern New South Wales and northern Tasmania.)

Family Pomatomidae – Tailor, bluefishes

- Pomatomus saltatrix (Linnaeus, 1766) Tailor, chopper (Onslow, Western Australia, to Fraser Island, Queensland, and around Tasmania. Also widely distributed overseas.)

Family Carangidae – Trevallies

- Pseudocaranx georgianus (Cuvier, 1833) Silver trevally, white trevally, skipjack trevally, skippy (Lancelin, Western Australia, to northern New South Wales and around Tasmania. Also New Zealand.)
- Pseudocaranx wrighti (Whitley, 1931) Skipjack trevally, sand trevally (Exmouth Gulf, Western Australia, to eastern Bass Strait, Victoria, and Flinders Island, Tasmania.)
- Seriola lalandi Valenciennes, 1833 Yellowtail kingfish (Perth, Western Australia, to Capricorn Group, Queensland, and northern Tasmania.)
- Trachurus declivis (Jenyns, 1841) Common jack mackerel, horse mackerel, scad, cowanyoung (Shark Bay, Western Australia, to southern Queensland and around Tasmania. Also New Zealand.)
- Trachurus novaezelandiae Richardson, 1843 Yellowtail scad, yellowtail mackerel, yellowtail, yellowtail horse mackerel (North West Cape, Western Australia, to Wide Bay, Queensland. Also Lord Howe Island and New Zealand.)

Family Arripidae – Australian salmons

- Arripis georgianus (Valenciennes, 1831) Australian herring, tommy ruff, sea herring (Shark Bay, Western Australia, to Lakes Entrance, Victoria.)
- Arripis truttaceus (Cuvier, 1829) Western Australian salmon, cocky salmon, blackback salmon, bay trout, salmon trout (Kalbarri, Western Australia, to Eden, New South Wales, and around Tasmania.)
- Arripis trutta (Forster, 1801)Eastern Australian salmon, cocky salmon, blackback salmon, bay trout, salmon trout (Port Phillip Bay, Victoria, to Brisbane, Queensland, and around Tasmania. Also Lord Howe Island and New Zealand.)

Family Gerreidae – Silverbiddies, silverbellies

- Gerres subfasciatus Cuvier, 1830 Common silverbiddy, roach, common silverbelly (Tropical Australia south to Albany, Western Australia, and to Wollongong, New South Wales.)
- Parequula melbournensis (Castelnau, 1872) Silverbelly, lowfin (Rottnest Island, Western Australia, to Merimbula, New South Wales, and around Tasmania.)

Family Sparidae – Breams

- Acanthopagrus australis (Owen, 1853) Yellowfin bream, bream, silver bream (Lakes Entrance, Victoria, to Townsville, Queensland.)
- Acanthopagrus butcheri (Munro, 1949) Black bream (Shark Bay, Western Australia, to Mallacoota, Victoria, and around Tasmania.)
- Rhabdosargus sarba (Forsskål, 1775) Tarwhine (Coral Bay to Albany, Western Australia, and Lakes Entrance, Victoria, to Queensland. Also widespread overseas.)
- Pagrus auratus (Schneider, 1801) Snapper, cockney bream, red bream, squire, old man (Barrow Island, Western Australia, to Hinchinbrook Island, Queensland, and northern Tasmania. Also New Zealand, Japan and the Indo-Malayan region.)

Family Sciaenidae – Jewfishes, croakers, drum

- Argyrosomus japonicus (Temminck & Schlegel, 1843) Mulloway, jewfish, river kingfish, soapy, butterfish (Exmouth Gulf, Western Australia, to Burnett River, Queensland. Also southern Africa, east Asia.)

Family Haemulidae – Sweetlips, grunter breams

- Plectorhinchus flavomaculatus (Ehrenberg, 1830) Goldspotted sweetlips, netted morwong (Tropical Australia south to Geographe Bay, Western Australia, and to Moruya, New South Wales. Also widespread in the Indo-West Pacific region.)

Family Nemipteridae – Threadfin bream, spinecheeks

- Pentapodus vitta Quoy & Gaimard, 1824 Western butterfish (Dampier Archipelago to Geographe Bay, Western Australia.)

Family Mullidae – Goatfishes, red mullet

- Parupeneus spilurus (Bleeker, 1854) Blacksaddle goatfish (Tropical Australia south to Geographe Bay, Western Australia, and to Mallacoota, Victoria. Also Lord Howe Island, New Zealand and New Guinea.)
- Upeneichthys lineatus (Bloch & Schneider, 1801) Bluestriped goatfish, bluelined goatfish, red mullet (Mallacoota, Victoria, to southern Queensland.)
- Upeneichthys vlamingii (Cuvier, 1829) Bluespotted goatfish, southern goatfish, red mullet (Jurien Bay, Western Australia, to Wilsons Promontory, Victoria, and around Tasmania.)
- Upeneus tragula Richardson, 1846 Bartail goatfish (Tropical Australia south to Perth, Western Australia, and to Merimbula, New South Wales.)

Family Monodactylidae – Silver batfishes, pomfrets

- Schuettea scalaripinnis Steindachner, 1866 Eastern pomfret (Montague Island, New South Wales, to Noosa, Queensland.)
- Schuettea woodwardi (Waite, 1905) Western pomfret, Woodward's pomfret (Shark Bay, Western Australia, to Ceduna, South Australia.)

Family Pempheridae – Bullseyes, sweepers

- Parapriacanthus elongatus (McCulloch, 1911) Elongate bullseye, slender bullseye (Perth, Western Australia, to Disaster Bay, New South Wales, and around Tasmania.)
- Pempheris affinis McCulloch, 1911 Blacktip bullseye (Montague Island, New South Wales, to Hervey Bay, Queensland.)
- Pempheris compressa (Shaw, 1790) Smallscale bullseye (Cape Howe, Victoria, to Byron Bay, New South Wales, and Kent Group, Tasmania.)
- Pempheris klunzingeri McCulloch, 1911 Rough bullseye, Klunzinger's bullseye (Shark Bay, Western Australia, to Gulf St Vincent, South Australia.)
- Pempheris multiradiata Klunzinger, 1879 Bigscale bullseye, common bullseye, large-scaled bullseye (Jurien Bay, Western Australia, to Terrigal, New South Wales, and around Tasmania.)
- Pempheris ornata Mooi & Jubb, 1996 Orangelined bullseye (Dongara, Western Australia, to Kangaroo Island, South Australia.)

Family Kyphosidae – Drummers, rudderfishes

- Kyphosus cornelii (Whitley, 1944) Western buffalo bream (Coral Bay to Cape Leeuwin, Western Australia.)
- Kyphosus sydneyanus (Günther, 1886) Silver drummer, buffalo bream, buff bream, Sydney drummer (Shark Bay, Western Australia, to Moreton Bay, Queensland, and northern Tasmania. Also Lord Howe Island and New Zealand.)

Family Girellidae – Blackfishes

- Girella cyanea Macleay, 1881 Blue drummer, bluefish (Eden to Byron Bay, New South Wales. Also Lord Howe Island, Norfolk Island and New Zealand.)
- Girella elevata Macleay, 1881 Rock blackfish, eastern rock blackfish, black drummer (Wilsons Promontory, Victoria, to Noosa, Queensland, and eastern Tasmania south to St Helens. Also Lord Howe Island.)
- Girella tephraeops (J. Richardson, 1846) Rock blackfish (Eastern Indian Ocean: Western Australia.)
- Girella tricuspidata (Quoy & Gaimard, 1824) Luderick, blackfish (Adelaide, South Australia, to Hervey Bay, Queensland, and northern Tasmania.)
- Girella zebra (Richardson, 1846) Zebrafish (Jurien Bay, Western Australia, to Sydney, New South Wales, and around Tasmania.)

Family Scorpididae – Sweeps

- Atypichthys strigatus (Günther 1860) Mado (Apollo Bay, Victoria, to Noosa, Queensland, and south to Fortescue Bay, Tasmania. Also Lord Howe Island.)
- Microcanthus strigatus (Cuvier, 1831) Stripey, footballer (Exmouth Gulf to Cape Leeuwin, Western Australia, and Merimbula, New South Wales, to Capricorn Group, Queensland. Also Japan, China and Hawaii.)
- Neatypus obliquus Waite, 1905 Footballer sweep, western footballer (Shark Bay, Western Australia, to Port Lincoln, South Australia.)
- Scorpis aequipinnis Richardson, 1848 Sea sweep, snapjack (Shark Bay, Western Australia, to Jervis Bay, New South Wales, and around Tasmania.)
- Scorpis georgiana Valenciennes, 1832 Banded sweep (Coral Bay, Western Australia, to Kangaroo Island, South Australia.)
- Scorpis lineolata Kner, 1865 Silver sweep, sweep (Port Phillip Bay, Victoria, to Noosa, Queensland, and around Tasmania. Also Lord Howe Island and New Zealand.)
- Tilodon sexfasciatus (Richardson, 1842) Moonlighter, six-banded coral fish, butterfish (Jurien Bay, Western Australia, to Port Phillip Bay, Victoria, and Wynyard, Tasmania.)

Family Chaetodontidae – Butterflyfishes

- Amphichaetodon howensis (Waite, 1903)Lord Howe butterflyfish (Merimbula, New South Wales, to southern Queensland. Also Lord Howe Island and New Zealand.)
- Chaetodon guentheri Ahl, 1913 Gunther's butterflyfish (Merimbula, New South Wales, to Capricorn Group, Queensland.)
- Chelmonops curiosus Kuiter, 1986 Western talma, truncate coralfish, squareback butterflyfish (Shark Bay, Western Australia, to Robe, South Australia.)
- Chelmonops truncatus (Kner, 1859) Eastern talma, truncate coralfish (Merimbula, New South Wales, to Noosa, Queensland.)

Family Enoplosidae – Old wife

- Enoplosus armatus (Shaw, 1790) Old wife (Kalbarri, Western Australia, to Noosa, Queensland, and northern Tasmania.)

Family Pentacerotidae – Boarfishes

- Parazanclistius hutchinsi Hardy, 1983 Short boarfish, Hutchins' boarfish (Rottnest Island, Western Australia, to Port Phillip Bay, Victoria.)
- Pentaceropsis recurvirostris (Richardson, 1845) Longsnout boarfish (Rottnest Island, Western Australia, to Sydney, New South Wales, and around Tasmania.)

Family Pomacentridae – Damselfishes

- Chromis hypsilepis (Günther, 1867) Onespot puller (Mallacoota, Victoria, to Byron Bay, New South Wales, and south to Bicheno, Tasmania. Also Lord Howe Island, Norfolk Island and New Zealand.)
- Chromis klunzingeri Whitley, 1929 Blackhead puller (Houtman Abrolhos to Recherche Archipelago, Western Australia.)
- Mecaenichthys immaculatus (Ogilby, 1885) Immaculate damsel, false parma, blue puller (Merimbula, New South Wales, to southern Queensland.)
- Parma mccullochi Whitley, 1929 McCulloch's scalyfin, common scalyfin (Houtman Abrolhos to Recherche Archipelago, Western Australia.)
- Parma microlepis Günther, 1862 White-ear (Port Phillip Bay, Victoria, to Byron Bay, New South Wales, and south to Maria Island, Tasmania.)
- Parma occidentalis Allen & Hoese, 1975 Western scalyfin (Coral Bay to Cape Leeuwin, Western Australia.)
- Girdled scalyfin, girdled parma Parma unifasciata (Steindachner, 1867) (Montague Island, New South Wales, to Noosa, Queensland.)
- Parma oligolepis Whitley, 1929 Bigscale scalyfin (Sydney, New South Wales, to Cairns, Queensland.)
- Parma polylepis Günther, 1862 Banded scalyfin (Bass Point, New South Wales, to Capricorn Group, Queensland. Also Lord Howe Island, Norfolk Island and New Caledonia.)
- Parma victoriae (Günther, 1863) Scalyfin, Victorian scalyfin, rock perch (Dongara, Western Australia, to Wilsons Promontory, Victoria, and northern Tasmania.)

Family Cirrhitidae – Hawkfishes

- Cirrhitichthys aprinus (Cuvier, 1829) Blotched hawkfish (Tropical Australia south to Houtman Abrolhos, Western Australia, and to Merimbula, New South Wales. Also widespread in the Indo-West Pacific region.)
- Notocirrhitus splendens (Ogilby, 1889) Splendid hawkfish (Northern New South Wales. Also Lord Howe Island, Norfolk Island, and Kermadec Islands.)

Family Chironemidae – Kelpfishes

- Chironemus maculosus (Richardson, 1850) syn. Threpterius maculosus ((as T. maculosus) Silver spot Lancelin, Western Australia, to Port Phillip, Victoria, and northern Tasmania.)
- Chironemus marmoratus Günther, 1860 Eastern kelpfish (Mallacoota, Victoria, to Byron Bay, New South Wales, and northeastern Tasmania. Also New Zealand.)

Family Aplodactylidae – Marblefishes, sea carps

- Aplodactylus arctidens Richardson, 1839 Marblefish, southern seacarp, stinky groper (Investigator Group, South Australia, to Cape Conran, Victoria, and around Tasmania. Also New Zealand.)
- Aplodactylus lophodon (Günther, 1859) Rock cale, cockatoo fish, rock cocky, joey (Mallacoota, Victoria, to Byron Bay, New South Wales.)
- Aplodactylus westralis Russell, 1987 Western seacarp, cockatoo morwong (Rottnest Island to Recherche Archipelago, Western Australia.)

Family Cheilodactylidae – Morwongs

- Cheilodactylus ephippium McCulloch & Waite, 1916 Painted morwong (Central and northern New South Wales. Also Lord Howe Island, Norfolk Island, and New Zealand.)
- Cheilodactylus fuscus Castelnau, 1879 Red morwong (Eastern Bass Strait, Victoria, to Hervey Bay, Queensland. Also New Zealand.)
- Cheilodactylus gibbosus Richardson, 1841 Magpie morwong, western crested morwong (Shark Bay to Recherche Archipelago, Western Australia.)
- Cheilodactylus nigripes Richardson, 1850 Magpie perch (Albany, Western Australia, to Kiama, New South Wales, and south to Bruny Island, Tasmania.)
- Cheilodactylus rubrolabiatus Allen & Heemstra, 1976 Redlip morwong (Coral Bay, Western Australia, to Ceduna, South Australia.)
- Cheilodactylus spectabilis Hutton, 1872 Banded morwong, carp (Victor Harbor, South Australia, to Seal Rocks, New South Wales, and around Tasmania. Also New Zealand.)
- Cheilodactylus vestitus (Castelnau, 1879) Crested morwong, eastern magpie morwong (Port Hacking, New South Wales, to Capricorn Group, Queensland.)
- Dactylophora nigricans (Richardson, 1850) Dusky morwong, strongfish (Lancelin, Western Australia, to Port Phillip Bay, Victoria, and south to Maria Island, Tasmania.)
- Nemadactylus douglasii (Hector, 1875) Grey morwong, blue morwong, rubberlip perch (Wilsons Promontory, Victoria, to Moreton Bay, Queensland, and south to Storm Bay, Tasmania. Also New Zealand.)
- Nemadactylus macropterus (Bloch & Schneider, 1801) Jackass morwong, sea bream, silver perch (Rottnest Island, Western Australia, to Moreton Bay, Queensland, and around Tasmania. Also New Zealand, southern Africa and South America.)
- Nemadactylus valenciennesi (Whitley, 1937) Blue morwong, queen snapper (Shark Bay, Western Australia, to Wilsons Promontory, Victoria, and King Island, Tasmania.)

Family Latridae – Trumpeters

- Latridopsis forsteri (Castelnau, 1872) Bastard trumpeter (Robe, South Australia, to Sydney, New South Wales, and around Tasmania.)
- Latris lineata (Bloch & Schneider, 1801) Striped trumpeter, Tasmanian trumpeter, stripey (Albany, Western Australia, to Montague Island, New South Wales, and around Tasmania. Also New Zealand and Amsterdam Island.)
- Mendosoma lineatum (Guichenot, 1848) Real bastard trumpeter, telescope fish (Bruny Island to Freycinet Peninsula, Tasmania. Also New Zealand.)

Family Mugilidae – Mullets

- Aldrichetta forsteri (Valenciennes, 1836) Yellow-eye mullet, Coorong mullet (Shark Bay, Western Australia, to Newcastle, New South Wales, and around Tasmania.)
- Mugil cephalus Linnaeus, 1758 Sea mullet (Around Australia. Also widespread overseas.)

Family Sphyraenidae – Pikes, barracudas

- Sphyraena novaehollandiae Günther, 1860 Snook, shortfin pike, sea pike, pickhandle (Jurien Bay, Western Australia, to southern Queensland and northern Tasmania.)

Family Labridae – Wrasses

- Achoerodus gouldii (Richardson, 1843) Western blue groper (Houtman Abrolhos to Port Phillip, Victoria.)
- Achoerodus viridis (Steindachner, 1866) Eastern blue groper (Wilsons Promontory, Victoria, to Hervey Bay, Queensland, and Kent Group, Tasmania.)
- Anampses elegans Ogilby, 1889 Elegant wrasse (Southern to central New South Wales. Also Lord Howe Island, Norfolk Island and New Zealand.)
- Austrolabrus maculatus (Macleay, 1881) Blackspotted wrasse (Shark Bay, Western Australia, to Victor Harbor, South Australia, and Montague Island to Byron Bay, New South Wales.)
- Bodianus diana (Lacépède, 1801) Diana's pigfish (Tropical Australia south to Montague Island, New South Wales. Also widespread in the Indo-Pacific region.)
- Bodianus frenchii (Klunzinger, 1880) Foxfish, western foxfish (Dongara, Western Australia, to Yorke Peninsula, South Australia; eastern Victoria to Mooloolaba, Queensland; and northeastern Tasmania.)
- Choerodon rubescens (Günther, 1862) Baldchin groper (Coral Bay to Geographe Bay, Western Australia.)
- Coris auricularis (Valenciennes, 1839) Western king wrasse (Coral Bay to Recherche Archipelago, Western Australia.)
- Coris bulbifrons Randall & Kuiter, 1982 Doubleheader (Central New South Wales. Also Lord Howe Island and Norfolk Island.)
- Coris picta (Bloch & Schneider, 1801) Comb wrasse, combfish (Eastern Victoria to Moreton Bay, Queensland. Also Lord Howe Island, Norfolk Island and New Zealand.)
- Coris sandageri (Hector, 1884) Eastern king wrasse, Sandager's wrasse (Eastern Victoria to Solitary Islands, New South Wales. Also New Zealand.)
- Dotalabrus alleni Russell, 1988 Little rainbow wrasse (Jurien Bay to Recherche Archipelago, Western Australia.)
- Dotalabrus aurantiacus (Castelnau, 1872) Castelnau's wrasse, pretty polly (Rottnest Island, Western Australia, to Montague Island, New South Wales, and northern and eastern Tasmania.)
- Eupetrichthys angustipes Ramsay & Ogilby, 1888 Snakeskin wrasse (Houtman Abrolhos, Western Australia, to Solitary Islands, New South Wales, and Kent Group, Tasmania.)
- Halichoeres brownfieldi (Whitley, 1945) Brownfield's wrasse (Coral Bay to Recherche Archipelago, Western Australia.)
- Notolabrus fucicola (Richardson, 1840) Purple wrasse, kelpie, parrot fish, winter bream, saddled wrasse (Kangaroo Island, South Australia, to Montague Island, New South Wales, and around Tasmania. Also New Zealand.)
- Notolabrus gymnogenis (Günther, 1862) Crimsonband wrasse (Mallacoota, Victoria, to southern Queensland, and Kent Group, Tasmania. Also Lord Howe Island.)
- Notolabrus inscriptus (Richardson, 1848) Inscribed wrasse (Eden to Sydney, New South Wales. Also Lord Howe Island, Norfolk Island and New Zealand.) (Albany, Western Australia, to Sydney, New South Wales, and around Tasmania.)
- Notolabrus parilus (Richardson, 1850)Brownspotted wrasse, orange-spotted wrasse (Shark Bay, Western Australia, to Queenscliff, Victoria.)
- Notolabrus tetricus (Richardson, 1840) Bluethroat wrasse, bluenose, parrot fish, kelpie, winter bream, bluehead (Ceduna, South Australia, to Sydney, New South Wales, and around Tasmania.)
- Ophthalmolepis lineolata (Valenciennes, 1839) Southern maori wrasse, maori wrasse (Houtman Abrolhos, Western Australia, to southern Queensland, and Kent Group, Tasmania.)
- Pictilabrus laticlavius (Richardson, 1840) Senator wrasse (Houtman Abrolhos, Western Australia, to Byron Bay, New South Wales, and around Tasmania.)
- Pictilabrus viridis Russell, 1988 False senator wrasse (Jurien Bay to Recherche Archipelago, Western Australia.)
- Pseudolabrus biserialis (Klunzinger, 1880) Redband wrasse (Houtman Abrolhos to Recherche Archipelago, Western Australia.)
- Pseudolabrus luculentus (Richardson, 1848) Luculent wrasse (Cape Conran, Victoria, to Byron Bay, New South Wales. Also Lord Howe Island, Norfolk Island and New Zealand.)
- Pseudolabrus guentheri Bleeker, 1862 Gunther's wrasse (Montague Island, New South Wales, to Whitsunday Group, Queensland.)

Howe Island, Norfolk Island and New Zealand.)

- Pseudolabrus rubicundus (Macleay, 1881) Rosy wrasse (Albany, Western Australia, to Sydney, New South Wales, and around Tasmania.)
- Suezichthys aylingi Russell, 1985 Crimson cleaner wrasse, crimson wrasse, butcher's dick (Eastern Victoria to Seal Rocks, New South Wales, and eastern Tasmania. Also New Zealand.)
- Suezichthys cyanolaemus Russell, 1985 Bluethroat rainbow wrasse (Point Quobba to Albany, Western Australia.)

Family Odacidae – Rock whitings, weed whitings

- Haletta semifasciata (Valenciennes, 1840) Blue weed whiting, grass whiting, blue rock whiting, stranger, blue-arsed whiting (Fremantle, Western Australia, to Sydney, New South Wales, and around Tasmania.)
- Heteroscarus acroptilus (Richardson, 1846) Rainbow cale, rainbow fish (Kalbarri, Western Australia, to Newcastle, New South Wales, and south to Maria Island, Tasmania.)
- Neoodax balteatus (Valenciennes, 1840) Little weed whiting, ground mullet, little rock whiting (Fremantle, Western Australia, to Sydney, New South Wales, and around Tasmania.)
- Odax cyanomelas (Richardson, 1850) Herring cale (Kalbarri, Western Australia, to Coffs harbour, New South Wales, and south to Tasman Peninsula, Tasmania.)
- Siphonognathus attenuatus (Ogilby, 1897) Slender weed whiting (Rottnest Island, Western Australia, to Wilsons Promontory, Victoria, and south to Freycinet Peninsula, Tasmania.)
- Siphonognathus beddomei (Johnston, 1885) Pencil weed whiting, pencil rock whiting, pygmy rock whiting (Dongara, Western Australia, to Wilsons Promontory, Victoria, and around Tasmania.)
- Siphonognathus radiatus (Quoy & Gaimard, 1834) Long-rayed weed whiting

Family Pinguipedidae – Grubfishes, weevers

- Parapercis haackei (Steindachner, 1884) Wavy grubfish (Point Quobba, Western Australia, to Gulf St Vincent, South Australia.)
- Parapercis ramsayi Steindachner, 1884 Spotted grubfish (Perth, Western Australia, to Kangaroo Island, South Australia, and Montague Island to Byron Bay, New South Wales.)

Family Bovichthyidae – Thornfishes

- Bovichtus angustifrons (Regan, 1913) Dragonet, thornfish, marblefish (Ceduna, South Australia, to Eden, New South Wales, and around Tasmania.)
- Pseudophritis urvillii (Valenciennes, 1831) Congolli, freshwater flathead, sandy, tupong (Streaky Bay, South Australia, to Bega, New South Wales, and around Tasmania.)

Family Blennidae – Blennies

- Omobranchus anolius (Valenciennes, 1836) Oyster blenny (Spencer gulf, South Australia to the Queensland coast of the Gulf of Carpentaria)
- Parablennius intermedius (Ogilby, 1915) Horned blenny (Merimbula, New South Wales, to Queensland.)
- Parablennius tasmanianus (Richardson, 1849) Tasmanian blenny (Ceduna, South Australia, to Eden, New South Wales, and around Tasmania.)
- Petroscirtes lupus (De Vis, 1885) Brown sabretooth blenny (Merimbula, New South Wales, to southern Queensland. Also New Caledonia.)
- Plagiotremus rhinorhynchos (Bleeker, 1852) Bluestriped fangblenny, blue-lined sabretooth blenny (Tropical Australia south to Walpole, Western Australia, and to Merimbula, New South Wales. Also widespread in the Indo-West Pacific region.)
- Plagiotremus tapeinosoma (Bleeker, 1857) Piano fangblenny, hit and run blenny, yellow sabretooth blenny (Tropical Australia south to Rottnest Island, Western Australia, and to Merimbula, New South Wales. Also widespread in the Indo-West Pacific region.)

Family Tripterygiidae – Triplefins, threefins

- Forsterygion varium (Schneider, 1801) Variable threefin, many-rayed threefin (Southeastern Tasmania. Also New Zealand.)
- Helcogramma decurrens McCulloch & Waite, 1918 Blackthroat triplefin, yellowback threefin (Point Quobba, Western Australia, to Victor Harbor, South Australia.)
- Lepidoblennius haplodactylus Steindachner, 1867 Eastern jumping blenny, jumping joey (Western Port, Victoria, to Byron Bay, New South Wales.)
- Lepidoblennius marmoratus (Macleay, 1878)Western jumping blenny (Rottnest Island, Western Australia, to Cape Jervis, South Australia.)
- Trinorfolkia clarkei (Morton, 1888) Clark's threefin, common threefin, Macleay's threefin (Rottnest Island, Western Australia, to Coffs Harbour, New South Wales, and around Tasmania.)

Family Clinidae – Weedfishes

- Cristiceps australis Valenciennes, 1836 Southern crested weedfish (Geraldton, Western Australia, to southern Queensland and around Tasmania.)
- Heteroclinus johnstoni (Saville-Kent, 1886) Johnston's weedfish (Kangaroo Island, South Australia, to Port Phillip Bay, Victoria, and around Tasmania.)
- Heteroclinus nasutus (Günther, 1861) Largenose weedfish (Port Phillip Bay, Victoria, to Minniewater, New South Wales.)
- Heteroclinus perspicillatus (Valenciennes, 1836) Common weedfish (Port Lincoln, South Australia, to Merimbula, New South Wales, and around Tasmania.)
- Heteroclinus tristis (Klunzinger, 1872) Longnose weedfish, Forster's weedfish (Recherche Archipelago, Western Australia, to Sydney, New South Wales, and around Tasmania.)

Family Ophiclinidae – Snake blennies

- Ophiclinus gabrieli Waite, 1906 Frosted snake blenny, Gabriel's snakeblenny (Kangaroo Island, South Australia, to Wilsons Promontory, Victoria, and northern Tasmania.)
- Ophiclinus gracilis Waite, 1906 Blackback snake blenny (Rottnest Island, Western Australia, to Sydney, New South Wales, and around Tasmania.)
- Sticharium dorsale Günther, 1867 Slender snake blenny, sand crawler (Cape Naturaliste, Western Australia, to Sydney, New South Wales, and northern Tasmania.)

Family Callionymidae – Dragonets, stinkfishes

- Eocallionymus papilio (Günther, 1864) Painted stinkfish (Kalbarri, Western Australia, to Port Stephens (New South Wales), and around Tasmania.)
- Foetorepus calauropomus (Richardson, 1844) Common stinkfish (Perth, Western Australia, to southern Queensland and around Tasmania.)
- Pseudocalliurichthys goodladi (Whitley, 1944) Longspine stinkfish, Goodlad's stinkfish (Exmouth Gulf to Esperance, Western Australia.)
- Repomucenus calcaratus (Macleay, 1881) Spotted dragonet (Southwest Western Australia to Kangaroo Island, South Australia, and southern New South Wales to Queensland.)

Family Gobiidae – Gobies

- Arenigobius bifrenatus (Kner, 1865) Bridled goby (Fremantle, Western Australia, to Moreton Bay, Queensland, and around Tasmania.)
- Bathygobius kreffti (Steindachner 1866) Krefft's goby, frayed-fin goby (Spencer Gulf, South Australia, and southern New South Wales to southern Queensland.)
- Callogobius depressus (Ramsay & Ogilby, 1886) Flathead goby (Dongara, Western Australia, to Byron Bay, New South Wales, and around Tasmania.)
- Favonigobius lateralis (Macleay, 1881) Southern longfin goby (Shark Bay, Western Australia, to central Queensland and around Tasmania.)
- Nesogobius sp. Groove-cheek goby (Rottnest Island, Western Australia, to Sydney, New South Wales.)
- Nesogobius hinsbyi (McCulloch & Ogilby, 1919) Hinsby's goby, orange-spotted goby (Port Phillip Bay, Victoria, and eastern, southern and western Tasmania.)
- Nesogobius maccullochi Hoese & Larson, 2006 Girdled goby (Eastern South Australia to eastern Victoria and around Tasmania.)
- Nesogobius pulchellus (Castelnau, 1872) Sailfin goby, Castelnau's goby (Fremantle, Western Australia, to Sydney, New South Wales, and around Tasmania.)
- Tasmanogobius gloveri Hoese, 1991 Glover's tasmangoby (Kangaroo Island, South Australia, to Western Port, Victoria, and around Tasmania.)

Family Uranoscopidae – Stargazers

- Kathetostoma laeve (Bloch & Schneider, 1801) Common stargazer (Esperance, Western Australia, to northern New South Wales and around Tasmania.)

Family Leptoscopidae – Sandfishes, sand stargazers

- Crapatalus munroi Last & Edgar, 1987 Pink sandfish, Munro's pygmy-stargazer (Victoria and around Tasmania.)

Family Gempylidae – Gemfishes

- Thyrsites atun (Euphrasen, 1791) Barracouta, snoek, couta (Shark Bay, Western Australia, to Moreton Bay, Queensland, and around Tasmania. Also occurs widely around the southern hemisphere in temperate latitudes.)

Family Centrolophidae – Trevallas

- Hyperoglyphe antarctica (Carmichael, 1819) Antarctic butterfish, bluenose warehou, deepsea trevally, blue eye trevalla, bluenose sea bass, or deep sea trevalla (Southwest Atlantic: Argentina. Southeast Atlantic and Western Indian Ocean: South Africa. Southwest Pacific: New Zealand and Australia (including Western Australia)).
- Seriolella brama (Günther, 1860) Blue warehou, warehou, snotgall trevalla, snotty-nose trevalla, Portland hake (South Australia to New South Wales and around Tasmania. Also New Zealand.)

Family Scombridae – Mackerels, tunas

- Sarda australis (Macleay, 1881) Australian bonito (Eastern Victoria to southern Queensland and eastern Tasmania.)
- Scomber australasicus Cuvier, 1832 Blue mackerel, slimy mackerel (Around the Australian mainland and Tasmania. Also widespread in southwest Pacific waters.)
- Thunnus maccoyi Castelnau, 1872 Southern bluefin tuna (Western Australia to southern Queensland and around Tasmania. Also widespread in the southern hemisphere.)

Family Siganidae – Rabbitfishes, spinefeet

- Siganus nebulosus (Quoy & Gaimard, 1825) Black rabbitfish, black spinefoot, happy moments (Shark Bay to Fremantle, Western Australia, and Eden, New South Wales, to Yeppoon, Queensland.)

Family Paralichthyidae – Sand flounders

- Pseudorhombus jenynsii (Bleeker, 1855) Smalltooth flounder (Fremantle, Western Australia, to southern Queensland.)

Family Pleuronectidae – Righteye flounders

- Ammotretis rostratus Günther, 1862 Longsnout flounder, sole (Augusta, Western Australia, to New South Wales and around Tasmania.)
- Ammotretis lituratus (Richardson, 1844) Spotted flounder, sole (Spencer Gulf, South Australia, to eastern Victoria and around Tasmania.)
- Ammotretis elongatus McCulloch, 1914 Elongate flounder (Geraldton, Western Australia, to eastern Victoria and Goose Island, Tasmania.)
- Rhombosolea tapirina (Günther, 1862) Greenback flounder (Southern Western Australia to southern New South Wales and around Tasmania. Also New Zealand.)

Family Soleidae – Soles

- Aseraggodes haackeanus (Steindachner, 1883) Southern sole (Perth, Western Australia, to Gulf St Vincent, South Australia.)
- Aseraggodes lenisquamis Randall, 2005 Peppered sole (New South Wales.)
- Brachirus nigra (Macleay, 1880) Black sole (Port Phillip Bay, Victoria, to southern Queensland.)
- Synclidopus macleayana (Ramsay, 1881) Narrowbanded sole (Sydney, New South Wales, to Mooloolaba, Queensland.)

Family Cynoglossidae – Tongue soles

- Cynoglossus broadhursti Waite, 1905 Southern tongue sole (Carnarvon, Western Australia, to Gulf St Vincent, South Australia.)
- Paraplagusia bilineata (Bloch, 1787) Lemon tongue sole (Tropical Australia south to Mandurah, Western Australia, and to southern New South Wales.)

Family Monacanthidae – Leatherjackets, filefishes

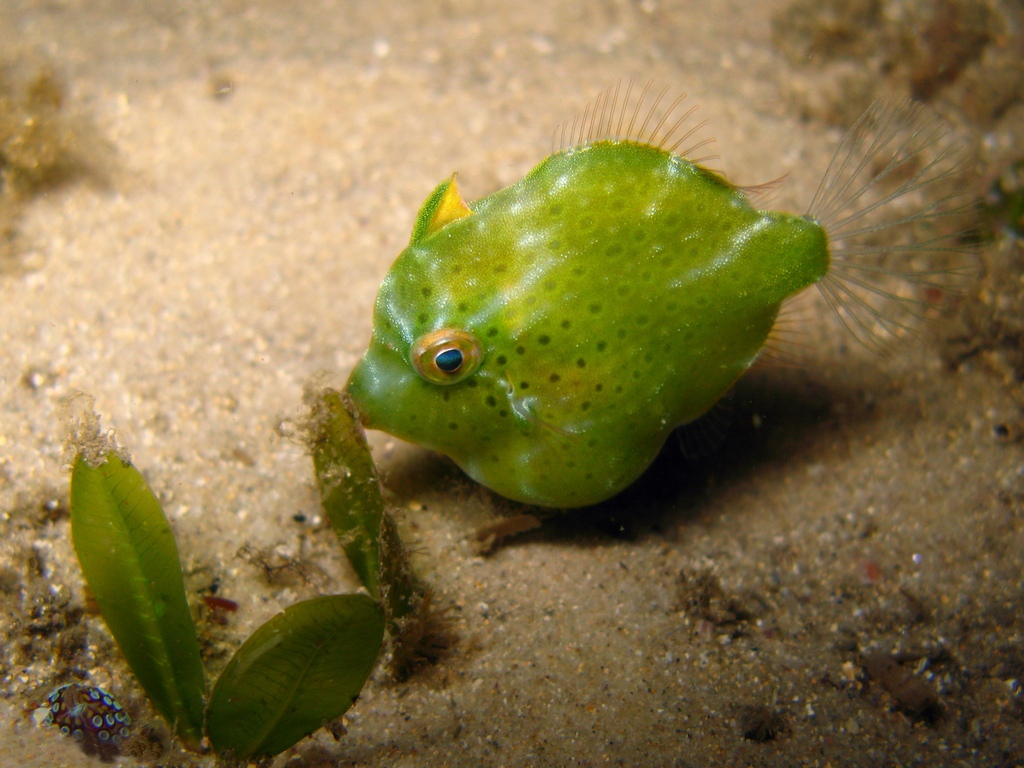
Brachaluteres jacksonianus (Pygmy leatherjacket)

- Acanthaluteres brownii (Richardson, 1846) Spinytail leatherjacket, Brown's leatherjacket (Rottnest Island, Western Australia, to Kangaroo Island, South Australia.)
- Acanthaluteres spilomelanurus (Quoy & Gaimard, 1824) Bridled leatherjacket (Fremantle, Western Australia, to Sydney, New South Wales, and around Tasmania.)
- Acanthaluteres vittiger (Castelnau, 1873) Toothbrush leatherjacket (Dongara, Western Australia, to Coffs Harbour, New South Wales, and around Tasmania.)
- Brachaluteres jacksonianus (Quoy & Gaimard, 1824) Southern pygmy leatherjacket (Lancelin, Western Australia, to Moreton Bay, Queensland, and around Tasmania.)
- Eubalichthys bucephalus (Whitley, 1931) Black reef leatherjacket, Whitley's leatherjacket (Houtman Abrolhos, Western Australia, to Broughton Island, New South Wales.)
- Eubalichthys cyanoura Hutchins, 1987 Bluetail leatherjacket (Dongara, Western Australia, to Adelaide, South Australia.)
- Eubalichthys gunnii (Günther, 1870) Gunn's leatherjacket, velvet leatherjacket (Port Lincoln, South Australia, to Wilsons Promontory, Victoria, and around Tasmania.)
- Eubalichthys mosaicus (Ramsay & Ogilby, 1886) Mosaic leatherjacket (Dongara, Western Australia, to Noosa, Queensland, and northern Tasmania.)
- Meuschenia australis (Donovan, 1824) Brownstriped leatherjacket (Robe, South Australia, to Wilsons Promontory, Victoria, and around Tasmania.)
- Meuschenia flavolineata Hutchins, 1977 Yellowstriped leatherjacket (Dongara, Western Australia, to Broughton Island, New South Wales, and northern Tasmania.)
- Meuschenia freycineti (Quoy & Gaimard, 1824) Sixspine leatherjacket (Jurien Bay, Western Australia, to Broughton Island, New South Wales, and around Tasmania.)
- Meuschenia galii (Waite, 1905) Bluelined leatherjacket (Shark Bay, Western Australia, to Wilsons Promontory, Victoria.)
- Meuschenia hippocrepis (Quoy & Gaimard, 1824) Horseshoe leatherjacket (Houtman Abrolhos, Western Australia, to Wilsons Promontory, Victoria, and south to Bicheno, Tasmania.)
- Meuschenia scaber (Forster, 1801) Velvet leatherjacket, cosmopolitan leatherjacket (Cape Naturaliste, Western Australia, to Sydney, New South Wales, and around Tasmania. Also New Zealand.)
- Meuschenia trachylepis (Günther, 1870) Yellowfin leatherjacket (Eastern Victoria to southern Queensland.)
- Meuschenia venusta Hutchins, 1977 Stars-and-stripes leatherjacket (Shark Bay, Western Australia, to Sydney, New South Wales, and northern Tasmania.)
- Monacanthus chinensis (Osbeck, 1765 Fanbelly leatherjacket) (Tropical Australia south to Geographe Bay, Western Australia, and to Western Port, Victoria. Also widespread in the Indo-West Pacific region.)
- Nelusetta ayraudi (Quoy & Gaimard, 1824) Ocean jacket, chinaman leatherjacket (North West Cape, Western Australia, to southern Queensland.)
- Scobinichthys granulatus (White, 1790) Rough leatherjacket (Shark Bay, Western Australia, to Maroochydore, Queensland, and northern Tasmania.)
- Thamnaconus degeni (Regan, 1903) Bluefin leatherjacket, Degen's leatherjacket (Great Australian Bight, Western Australia, to Wilsons Promontory, Victoria, and around Tasmania.)

Family Aracanidae – Temperate boxfishes

- Anoplocapros amygdaloides Fraser-Brunner, 1941 Western smooth boxfish (Shark Bay, Western Australia, to Great Australian Bight, South Australia.)
- Anoplocapros inermis (Fraser-Brunner, 1935) Eastern smooth boxfish, blue boxfish, robust boxfish (Western Port, Victoria, to southern Queensland.)
- Anoplocapros lenticularis (Richardson, 1841) Whitebarred boxfish, humpback boxfish (Dongara, Western Australia, to Lorne, Victoria.)
- Aracana aurita (Shaw, 1798) Shaw's cowfish (Dongara, Western Australia, to southern New South Wales and around Tasmania.)
- Aracana ornata (Gray, 1838) Ornate cowfish (Esperance, Western Australia, to Mallacoota, Victoria, and around Tasmania.)

Family Ostraciidae – Boxfishes, cowfishes, trunkfishes

- Tetrosomus gibbosus (Linnaeus, 1758) Humpback turretfish (Tropical Australia south to Albany, Western Australia, and to Cape Conran, Victoria. Also widespread in the Indo-West Pacific region.)

Family Tetraodontidae – Toadfishes, pufferfishes

- Contusus brevicaudus Hardy, 1981 Prickly toadfish (Rottnest Island, Western Australia, to Jervis Bay, New South Wales, and around Tasmania.)
- Omegophora armilla (Waite & McCulloch, 1915) Ringed toadfish (Lancelin, Western Australia, to Botany Bay, New South Wales, and around Tasmania.)
- Omegophora cyanopunctata Hardy & Hutchins, 1981 Bluespotted toadfish (Rottnest Island, Western Australia, to Gulf St Vincent, South Australia.)
- Polyspina piosae (Whitley, 1955) Orangebarred puffer (Rottnest Island, Western Australia, to Kangaroo Island, South Australia.)
- Tetractenos glaber (Freminville, 1813) Smooth toadfish (Port Lincoln, South Australia, to Moreton Bay, Queensland, and around Tasmania.)
- Torquigener pleurogramma (Regan, 1903) Weeping toadfish, banded toado (Coral Bay, Western Australia, to Adelaide, South Australia, and Narooma, New South Wales, to Hervey Bay, Queensland. Also Lord Howe Island.)
- Torquigener squamicaudata (Ogilby, 1911) Scalytail toadfish, brushtail toadfish (Wollongong, New South Wales, to Yeppoon, Queensland.)

Family Diodontidae – Porcupine fishes

- Dicotylichthys punctulatus Kaup, 185 Threebar porcupine fish 5 (Southern New South Wales to southern Queensland and Flinders Island, Tasmania.)
- Diodon nicthemerus Cuvier, 1818 Globefish, porcupine fish (Dongara, Western Australia, to Seal Rocks, New South Wales, and around Tasmania.)

=== Class Reptilia ===
- Dermochelys coriacea (Vandelli, 1761) Leathery turtle, luth (Around the Australian mainland and Tasmania. Also widespread overseas.)

=== Class Aves ===
- Eudyptula minor (Forster, 1781) Little penguin, blue penguin, fairy penguin (Fremantle, Western Australia, to Mooloolaba, Queensland, and around Tasmania. Also New Zealand.)
- Puffinus tenuirostris (Temminck, 1835) Short-tailed shearwater, muttonbird, moonbird, squab (St Francis Island, South Australia, to Broughton Island, New South Wales, and around Tasmania. Migrates to North Pacific.)

=== Class Mammalia ===
==== Order Pinnipedia ====
- Arctocephalus forsteri (Lesson, 1828) New Zealand fur seal (Albany, Western Australia, to eastern South Australia and Tasmania. Also New Zealand and associated subantarctic islands.)
- Arctocephalus pusillus (Schreber, 1976) Australian fur seal (Lady Julia Percy Island, Victoria, to Seal Rocks, New South Wales, and around Tasmania. Also southern Africa.)
- Neophoca cinerea (Péron, 1816) Australian sea lion (Houtman Abrolhos, Western Australia, to Kangaroo Island, South Australia.)

==== Order Cetacea ====
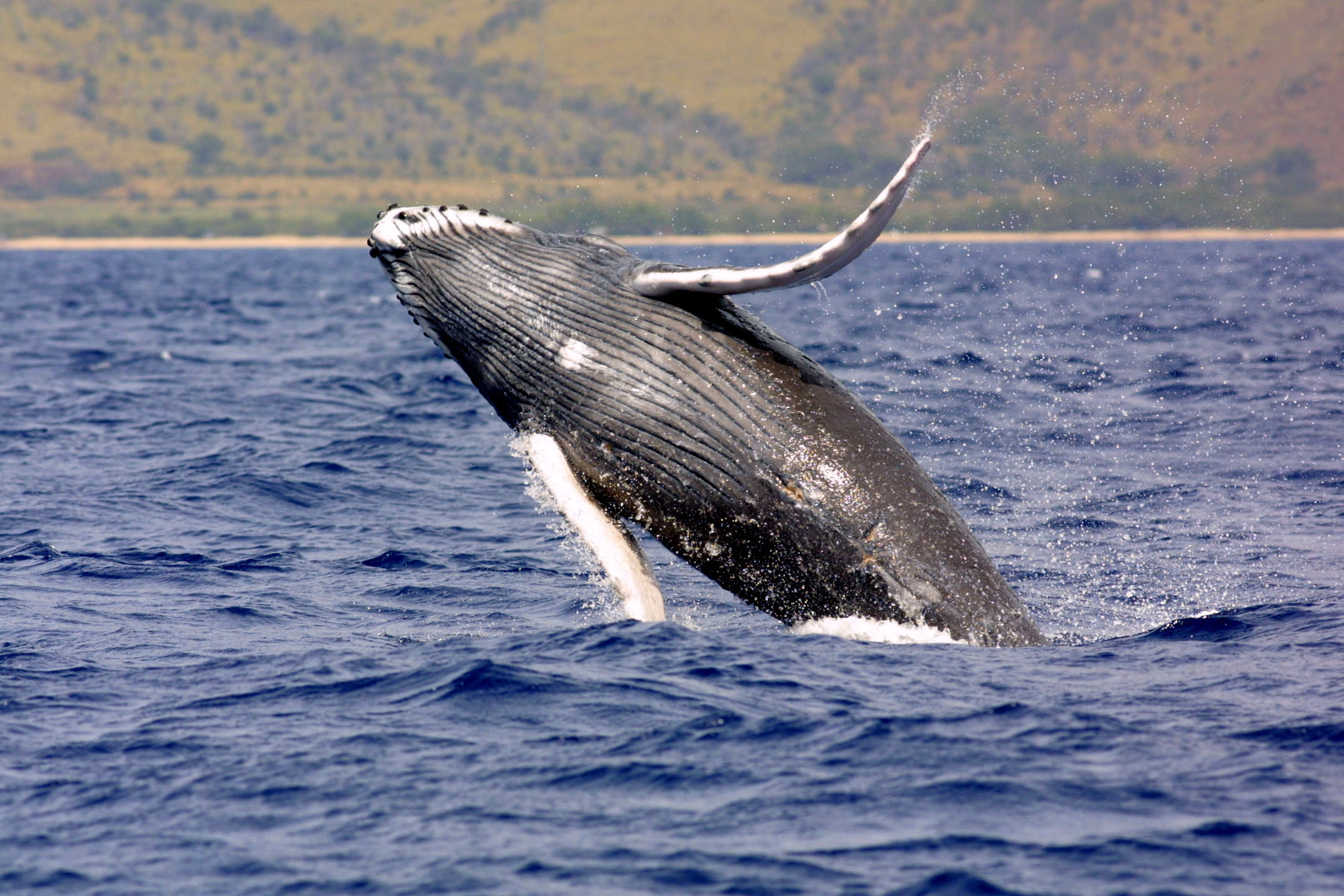
Megaptera novaeangliae (Humpback whale)

- Delphinus delphis (Linnaeus, 1758) Common dolphin (Around Australian mainland and Tasmania. Also widespread overseas.)
- Eubalaena australis (Desmoulins, 1822) Southern right whale (Southern and eastern mainland of Australia and Tasmania. Also widespread in the southern hemisphere.)
- Globicephala macrorhynchus (Gray, 1846) Short-finned pilot whale (Western, northern and eastern Australian mainland and northern Tasmania. Also widespread in tropical and warm-temperate waters overseas.)
- Megaptera novaeangliae (Borowski, 1781) Humpback whale (Around Australian mainland and Tasmania. Also widespread overseas.)
- Orcinus orca (Linnaeus, 1758) Killer whale, orca (Western, southern and eastern mainland of Australia and Tasmania. Also widespread overseas.)
- Tursiops aduncus (Ehrenberg, 1832) Indo-Pacific bottlenose dolphin (Around Australian mainland and Tasmania. Also widespread overseas.)

== Geographical position of places mentioned in species ranges ==
- Abrolhos Island
- Adelaide South Australia. 34.92889°S 138.60083°E
- Albany, Western Australia 35.0228°S 117.8814°E
- Alexander Bay, Western Australia 33.88749°S 122.77560°E
- Amsterdam Island37.82583°S 77.55472°E
- Anderson Inlet, Victoria 38.633°S 145.783°E
- Anglesea, Victoria 38.40639°S 144.18694°E
- Angourie, New South Wales 29.47917°S 153.35944°E
- Apollo Bay, Victoria 38.750°S 143.650°E
- Arnhem Land, Northern Territory 12.7308389°S 134.5928139°E
- Arrawarra, New South Wales 30.05812°S 153.20680°E
- Augusta, Western Australia 34.312°S 115.159°E
- Babel Island, Tasmania 39.933°S 148.317°E
- Backstairs Passage, South Australia 35.6908°S 138.0686°E
- Ballina, New South Wales 28.83333°S 153.53333°E
- Barrow Island (Western Australia) 20.798°S 115.406°E
- Bass Point, New South Wales34.59722°S 150.90000°E
- Bass Strait Islands, Tasmania
- Bass Strait, Victoria 40°S 146°E
- Batemans Bay, New South Wales35.70806°S 150.17444°E
- Beachport, South Australia37.500°S 140.017°E
- Beagle Island40.333°S 147.917°E
- Bega, New South Wales36.667°S 149.833°E
- Bermagui, New South Wales36.41667°S 150.06667°E
- Bicheno, Tasmania 41.867°S 148.283°E
- Bluff Point, Western Australia28.735°S 114.623°E
- Botany Bay, New South Wales 33.99778°S 151.23278°E
- Bowen, Queensland20.017°S 148.233°E
- Bremer Bay, Western Australia34.394°S 119.376°E
- Brisbane River, Queensland27.40000°S 153.15000°E
- Brisbane, Queensland27°28′22″S 153°01′40″E
- Broome, Western Australia17°57′43″S 122°14′10″E
- Broughton Island, New South Wales 32.61583°S 152.31722°E
- Brunswick Heads, New South Wales28.533°S 153.550°E
- Bruny Island, Tasmania43.367°S 147.283°E
- Bunbury, Western Australia33.34000°S 115.63917°E
- Burleigh Heads, Queensland28.104°S 153.436°E
- Burnett Heads, Queensland24.767°S 152.400°E
- Burnett River, Queensland24.767°S 152.400°E
- Bushy Island, Queensland20.950°S 150.083°E
- Busselton, Western Australia33.64778°S 115.34583°E
- Byron Bay, New South Wales 28.64306°S 153.61500°E
- Cairns, Queensland16.92556°S 145.77528°E
- Caloundra, Queensland 26.800°S 153.133°E
- Canal Rocks, Western Australia33.66803°S 114.99387°E
- Cape Adieu, South Australia32.00000°S 132.15179°E
- Cape Barren Island, Tasmania40.402°S 147.991°E
- Cape Bridgewater, Victoria38.36667°S 141.40000°E
- Cape Conran, Victoria 37.81288°S 148.73016°E
- Cape Cuvier, Western Australia 24.22325°S 113.39141°E
- Cape Everard, Victoria37°48′11″S 149°16′32″E
- Cape Flattery, Queensland14.94529°S 145.34627°E
- Cape Hawke, New South Wales 32°12′S 152°34′E
- Cape Howe, on the border of Victoria and New South Wales 37°30′S 149°58′E
- Cape Jaffa, South Australia36.95784°S 139.67009°E
- Cape Le Grande, Western Australia34.01767°S 122.11386°E
- Cape Leeuwin, West Australia 34.37417°S 115.13583°E
- Cape Liptrap, Victoria 38.900°S 145.922°E
- Cape Liptrap, Western Australia
- Cape Marino, South Australia35.4304°S 138.50961°E
- Cape Melville, Queensland 14.34917°S 144.64361°E
- Cape Moreton, Queensland 27.02917°S 153.46639°E
- Cape Naturaliste, Western Australia 33.53139°S 115.00444°E
- Cape Northumberland, South Australia 38.06083°S 140.66250°E
- Cape Otway, Victoria 38.850°S 143.517°E
- Cape Paterson, Victoria 38.6717°S 145.6198°E
- Cape York, Queensland10.683°S 142.533°E
- Capricorn Group, Queensland23.24833°S 151.77806°E
- Carnarvon, Western Australia24.884°S 113.661°E
- Ceduna, South Australia 32.117°S 133.667°E
- Cervantes, Western Australia30.5°S 115.066°E
- Clarence River, New South Wales 29.71667°S 153.61667°E
- Cockburn Sound, Western Australia 32.17056°S 115.72389°E
- Coffin Bay, South Australia. 34.617°S 135.467°E,
- Coffs Harbour, New South Wales30.30228°S 153.118896°E
- Collaroy, New South Wales33.730°S 151.300°E
- Cooktown, Queensland15.46667°S 145.28333°E
- Coolangatta, Queensland28.16667°S 153.53333°E
- The Coorong, South Australia36.04917°S 139.55361°E
- Coral Bay, Western Australia23.14472°S 113.77639°E
- Cottesloe, Western Australia31.993°S 115.757°E
- Cowaramup, Western Australia33.85°S 115.11°E
- Cox's Bight, Tasmania 43.52306°S 146.23917°E
- Crowdy Head, New South Wales 31.8450°S 152.7550°E
- Currumbin, Queensland28.136°S 153.483°E
- Dampier Archipelago, Western Australia 20.533°S 116.600°E
- Dampier, Western Australia 20.66°S 116.71°E
- D'Anville Bay, South Australia
- Darwin, Northern Territory12.45000°S 130.83333°E
- Deal Island, Tasmania39.47750°S 147.33889°E
- Denmark, Western Australia34.96000°S 117.35306°E
- D'Entrecasteaux Channel, Tasmania43.217°S 147.283°E
- Derwent estuary, Tasmania 43.05083°S 147.37722°E
- Disaster Bay, New South Wales37.258°S 150.046°E
- Discovery Bay, Victoria 38.050°S 140.867°E
- Dongara, Western Australia29.25°S 114.93°E
- Double Island Point, Queensland 25.933°S 153.183°E
- Double Island, Queensland16.726°S 145.684°E
- Dunsborough, Western Australia33.61667°S 115.10000°E
- Eaglehawk Neck, Tasmania43.01667°S 147.92583°E
- East Gippsland, Victoria
- Eastern Bass Strait, Victoria
- Eddystone Point, Tasmania
- Eden, New South Wales37.06667°S 149.90000°E
- Elliston, South Australia33.65000°S 134.88333°E
- Encounter Bay, South Australia 35.583°S 138.733°E
- Erith Island, Tasmania 39.450°S 147.283°E
- Esperance, Western Australia33.861°S 121.892°E
- Eucla, Western Australia31.675°S 128.883°E
- Evans Head, New South Wales29.11667°S 153.43333°E
- Exmouth Gulf, Western Australia 22.167°S 114.300°E
- Eyre Peninsula, South Australia 34.333°S 135.750°E
- Flinders Island, Tasmania40.000°S 148.117°E
- Flinders, Victoria38.474°S 145.022°E
- Fortescue Bay, Tasmania 43.13639°S 147.96278°E
- Foul Bay, Western Australia
- Fraser Island, Queensland25.217°S 153.133°E
- Fremantle Western Australia. 32.05694°S 115.74389°E
- Freycinet Peninsula, Tasmania 42.21°S 148.305278°E
- Furneaux Group, Tasmania40.167°S 148.083°E
- Gabo Island, Victoria 37.559067°S 149.911375°E
- Geographe Bay, Western Australia33.583°S 115.250°E
- Georges Bay, Tasmania 41.31639°S 148.29056°E
- Geraldton, Western Australia28.77917°S 114.61444°E
- Gnaraloo, Western Australia23.82111°S 113.52583°E
- Gold Coast, Queensland 28.01667°S 153.40000°E
- Goose Island, Tasmania 40.30139°S 147.79500°E
- Great Australian Bight, South Australia 33°S 130°E
- Green Cape, New South Wales 37.258°S 150.046°E
- Green Head, Western Australia 30.050°S 114.967°E
- Gulf of Carpentaria, Queensland 14°S 139°E
- Gulf St Vincent South Australia 35°S 138°E
- Gulfs region, South Australia
- Hastings Point, New South Wales 28.36250°S 153.58028°E
- Heard Island 53.10000°S 73.51667°E
- Heron Island, Queensland 23.4420000°S 151.9140000°E
- Hervey Bay, Queensland 25.28528°S 152.87278°E
- Hinchinbrook Island, Queensland 18.22944°S 146.23278°E
- Hopetoun, Western Australia 33.949°S 120.124°E
- Houtman Abrolhos 28.717°S 113.783°E
- Inverloch, Victoria 38.6334°S 145.7872°E
- Investigator Group, South Australia 33.75000°S 134.50000°E
- Investigator Strait, South Australia 35.39°S 137.28°E
- Jervis Bay, New South Wales 35.11972°S 150.73250°E
- Jurien Bay, Western Australia 30.297°S 115.042°E
- Kalbarri, Western Australia 27.71°S 114.16°E
- Kangaroo Island, South Australia 35.833°S 137.250°E
- Kent Group, Tasmania 39.46667°S 147.30833°E
- Keppel Bay, Queensland 39.46667°S 147.30833°E
- Kerguelen Island 49.250°S 69.167°E
- Kermadec Islands 29.27694°S 177.92333°W
- Kiama, New South Wales 34.67083°S 150.85417°E
- Kilcunda, Victoria38.900°S 145.783°E
- King George Sound, Western Australia 35.033°S 117.933°E
- King Island, Tasmania 39.867°S 143.983°E
- Kimberley, Western Australia16°S 126°E
- Lacepede Bay, South Australia 36.78083°S 139.74278°E
- Lady Julia Percy Island, Victoria 38°25′30″S 142°00′00″E
- Laguna Bay, Queensland
- Lake Burrill, New South Wales35.38333°S 150.45000°E
- Lakes Entrance, Victoria 37.867°S 147.983°E
- Lancelin, Western Australia 31.014°S 115.33°E
- Little Swanport, Tasmania 42.31194°S 147.99833°E
- Lizard Island, Queensland 14.66889°S 145.45944°E
- Lord Howe Island 31.550°S 159.083°E
- Lorne, Victoria 38.53333°S 143.96667°E
- Low Isles, Queensland 16.386°S 145.559°E
- Mackay, Queensland 21.14111°S 149.18611°E
- Mallacoota, Victoria 37.550°S 149.750°E
- Mandurah, Western Australia 32.52889°S 115.72306°E
- Margaret River, Western Australia 33.95500°S 115.07500°E
- Margate, Tasmania 43.02944°S 147.26167°E
- Maria Island, Tasmania42.633°S 148.083°E
- Marion Bay, Tasmania42.797°S 147.923°E
- Maroochydore, Queensland26.650°S 153.100°E
- Merimbula, New South Wales 36.89806°S 149.90111°E
- Minniewater, New South Wales
- Montague Island, New South Wales 36.250°S 150.217°E
- Monte Bello Islands, Western Australia 20.417°S 115.533°E
- Mooloolaba, Queensland 26.682°S 153.118°E
- Moore River, Western Australia31.367°S 115.483°E
- Moreton Bay, Queensland27.250°S 153.250°E
- Moreton Island, Queensland27.167°S 153.400°E
- Moruya, New South Wales 35.91111°S 150.08056°E
- Mullaloo, Western Australia 31.783°S 115.738°E
- Murray River, Western Australia32.58333°S 115.77139°E
- Nadgee Reserve, New South Wales 37.300°S 149.933°E
- Narooma, New South Wales 36.20000°S 150.13333°E
- New Caledonia21.25°S 165.30°E
- Newcastle, New South Wales 32.917°S 151.750°E
- Ningaloo, Western Australia 22.667°S 113.650°E
- Noosa, Queensland 26.38861°S 153.034806°E
- Norfolk Island 29.03°S 167.95°E
- North Reef, Queensland 23.18528°S 151.90361°E
- North Stradbroke Island, Queensland 27.583°S 153.467°E
- North West Cape Western Australia. 22.23°S 113.96°E
- Nowra, New South Wales 34.88333°S 150.60000°E
- Nuyts Archipelago, South Australia 32.32889°S 133.62528°E
- Onslow, Western Australia 21.63333°S 115.11667°E
- Otway Ranges, Victoria38.77333°S 143.55750°E
- Pearson Island, South Australia33.75000°S 134.50000°E
- Perth, Western Australia31.95222°S 115.85889°E
- Point Cloates, Western Australia 22.717°S 113.667°E
- Point Hicks, Victoria 37.80306°S 149.27556°E
- Point Maude, Western Australia
- Point Peron, Western Australia 32.26528°S 115.68611°E
- Point Quobba, Western Australia 24.49010°S 113.40809°E
- Point Samson, Western Australia
- Point Sinclair, South Australia 32.10456°S 132.97978°E
- Port Curtis, Queensland 23.84889°S 151.26250°E
- Port Davey, Tasmania 43.33°S 145.94°E
- Port Fairy, Victoria 38.367°S 142.233°E
- Port Gregory, Western Australia 28.18333°S 114.25000°E
- Port Hacking, New South Wales 34.06111°S 151.10000°E
- Port Hedland Western Australia. 20.310°S 118.601°E
- Port Lincoln, South Australia. 34.73222°S 135.85861°E
- Port MacDonnell, South Australia 38.05000°S 140.68333°E
- Port Macquarie, New South Wales 31.43333°S 152.90000°E
- Port Maud, Western Australia
- Port Molle, Queensland
- Port Phillip Bay, Victoria 38.150°S 144.867°E
- Port Phillip Heads, Victoria 38.27917°S 144.71528°E
- Port Phillip, Victoria. 38.150°S 144.867°E
- Port River, South Australia 34.750°S 138.500°E
- Port Sinclair, South Australia
- Port Stephens (New South Wales) 32.69917°S 152.12389°E
- Port Willunga, South Australia 35.266°S 138.465°E
- Portland, Victoria 38.333°S 141.600°E
- Portsea, Victoria| 38.320°S 144.713°E
- Proserpine, Queensland 20.40167°S 148.58139°E
- Queenscliff, Victoria 38.267°S 144.650°E
- Recherche Archipelago, Western Australia 33.917°S 121.883°E
- Richmond River, New South Wales
- Robe, South Australia37.150°S 139.750°E
- Rockhampton, Queensland23.3750°S 150.5117°E
- Rockingham, Western Australia32.281°S 115.727°E
- Rottnest Island, Western Australia32°00′07″S 115°31′01″E
- San Remo, Victoria 38°31′0″S 145°22′0″E
- Sandon, New South Wales
- Seacliff, South Australia35°2′S 138°31′E
- Seal Rocks, New South Wales32°25′13″S 152°30′27″E
- Shark Bay, Western Australia. 25.500°S 113.500°E
- Shellharbour, New South Wales34.583°S 150.867°E
- Solitary Islands, New South Wales
- Southport, Queensland 27.967°S 153.400°E
- Spencer Gulf, South Australia 34.417°S 136.750°E
- St Francis Island, South Australia
- St Helens, Tasmania 41.317°S 148.233°E
- Storm Bay, Tasmania 43.14°S 147.53°E
- Streaky Bay, South Australia32.79722°S 134.21111°E
- Swain Reefs, Queensland 21.23944°S 151.84667°E
- Swan River estuary, Western Australia31.94722°S 115.91611°E
- Swan River, Western Australia 31.94722°S 115.91611°E
- Sydney, New South Wales 33.859972°S 151.21111°E
- Tamar estuary, Tasmania 41.067°S 146.783°E
- Tangalooma, Queensland27.17667°S 153.37583°E
- Tasman Peninsula, Tasmania 43.08°S 147.86°E
- Tathra, New South Wales36.73333°S 149.96667°E
- Terrigal, New South Wales33.448011°S 151.444461°E
- The Entrance, New South Wales33.34722°S 151.49611°E
- Tin Can Bay, Queensland25.91667°S 153.00000°E
- Tinderbox, Tasmania
- Torres Strait, Queensland 9.833°S 142.500°E
- Townsville, Queensland 19.25639°S 146.81833°E
- Trial Bay, New South Wales 30.867°S 153.050°E
- Tweed Heads, New South Wales 28.18333°S 153.55000°E
- Two Rocks, Western Australia 31.495°S 115.588°E
- Twofold Bay, New South Wales 37.067°S 149.900°E
- Ulladulla, New South Wales 35.34861°S 150.46778°E
- Victor Harbor, South Australia 35.55000°S 138.61667°E
- Waldegrave Island, South Australia
- Walkerville, Victoria 38.85000°S 145.98333°E
- Walpole, Western Australia 34.98°S 116.7°E
- Waratah Bay, Victoria 38.86667°S 146.00000°E
- Warrnambool, Victoria 38.38°S 142.48°E
- West Island, South Australia 35.60833°S 138.59167°E
- Western Port, Victoria 38.367°S 145.333°E
- Whitsunday Group, Queensland 20.300°S 148.933°E
- Wide Bay, Queensland
- Wilsons Promontory, Victoria 39°02′S 146°23′E
- Wollongong, New South Wales34°25′59″S 150°52′59″E
- Wynyard, Tasmania41.00000°S 145.71667°E
- Yanchep, Western Australia31.55°S 115.634°E
- Yeppoon, Queensland23.133°S 150.733°E
- Yorke Peninsula, South Australia

== See also ==
- List of seaweeds and marine flowering plants of Australia (temperate waters)
- List of marine animals of the Cape Peninsula and False Bay
