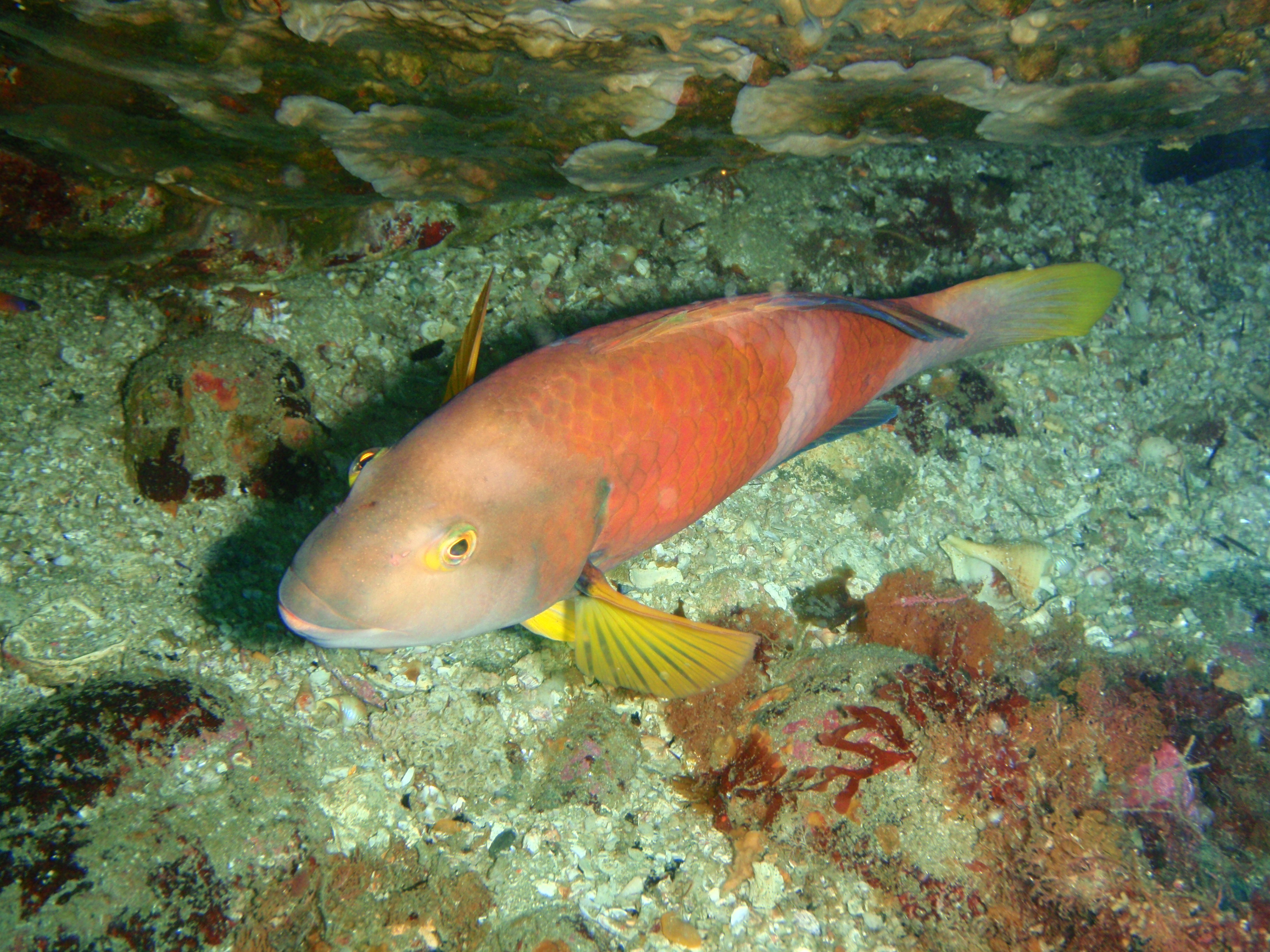
- Terminal phase
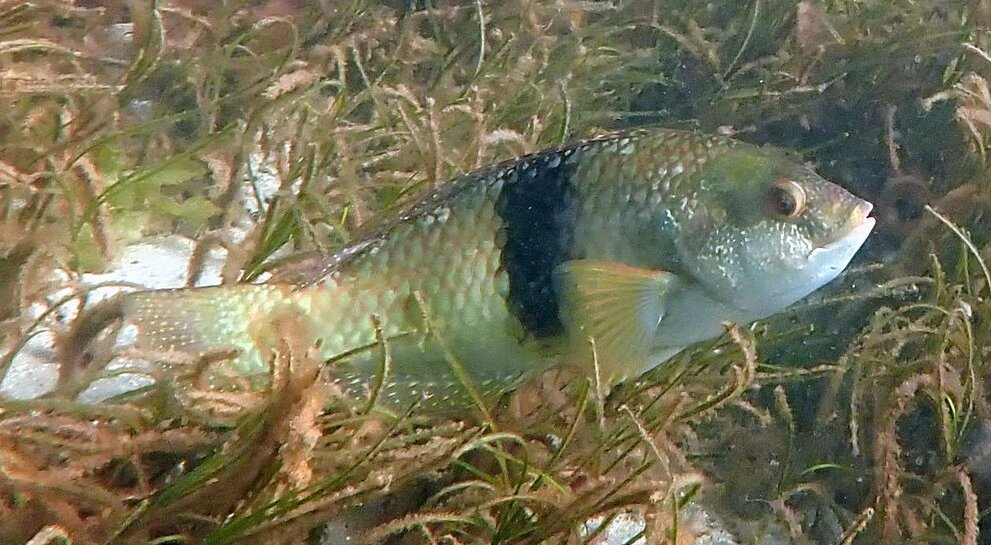
- Initial phase

Conservation status
- Least Concern (IUCN 3.1)

Scientific classification
- Kingdom: Animalia
- Phylum: Chordata
- Class: Actinopterygii
- Order: Labriformes
- Family: Labridae
- Genus: Notolabrus
- Species: N. tetricus

Binomial name
- Notolabrus tetricus Richardson, 1840

Synonyms
- List: Labrus tetricus Richardson, 1840; Pseudolabrus tetricus (Richardson, 1840); Tautoga tetrica (Richardson, 1840); Labrichthys bleekeri Castelnau, 1872; Pseudolabrus bleekeri (Castelnau, 1872); Labrichthys richardsoni Castelnau, 1872; Pseudolabrus richardsonii (Castelnau, 1872); Labrichthys vestita Castelnau, 1872; Pseudolabrus vestitus (Castelnau, 1872); Labrichthys cuvieri Castelnau, 1873; Labrichthys cyanogenys Ramsay & Ogilby, 1887; Pseudolabrus cyanogenys (Ramsay & Ogilby, 1887)

= Blue-throated wrasse =

Species of fish

The blue-throated wrasse (Notolabrus tetricus), also known as the bluehead, bluehead parrotfish, bluenose, bluenose parrotfish, bluethroat parrotfish, blue-throat wrasse, kelpie, lilac banded parrotfish, rocky bream, rocky cod, rotfish or winter bream, is a species of marine ray-finned fish from the family Labridae, the wrasses. It is found in the Indian and Pacific Ocean off the south-eastern coasts of Australia.

== Taxonomy ==
Notolabrus tetricus was first formally described in 1840 as Labrus tetricus by Scottish naturalist John Richardson (1787-1865) with the type locality given as Port Arthur in Tasmania. The specific name tetricus means "grim", a reference to the somewhat forbidding appearance of large males.

This species has been reported to hybridize with Notolabrus fucicola.

== Description ==
The body of the blue throated wrasse is moderately deep, and its snout is somewhat rounded. The males vary in colour and can have bodies which have greyish, greenish-blue or reddish-orange background colour. The head is pale with a blue chin and throat, the pectoral, pelvic and anal fins are yellow. There is an obvious, thick white vertical bar around the middle part of the body. Females and juveniles are greenish or brownish with a mottled pattern, they frequently show a large vertical patch with smaller white patches on the body next to it. Older females develop paler colouration to the rear of the vertical bar. This species can attain a total length of 50 centimetres (20 in) but the most common size for males is 30 to 45 centimetres (12 to 18 in) while females are normally 20 to 35 centimetres (7.9 to 13.8 in).

== Distribution ==
The blue-headed wrasse is endemic to the waters of south eastern Australia where it is found from Newcastle, New South Wales and Sydney in New South Wales south to Victoria and Tasmania, east to South Australia. They are ones of the dominant species of reef fish off northern Tasmania and southern Australia.

== Habitat ==
The blue-headed wrasse occurs in sheltered to exposed rocky reefs, frequently being recorded where there is sea weeds as deep as 160 metres (520 ft). The adults are normally to be found near the sea bed and prefer deeper waters than the juvenile fish. The smaller fish are found in shallower water than the adults where they frequent beds of kelp and other seaweeds, as well as sea grass.

== Biology ==
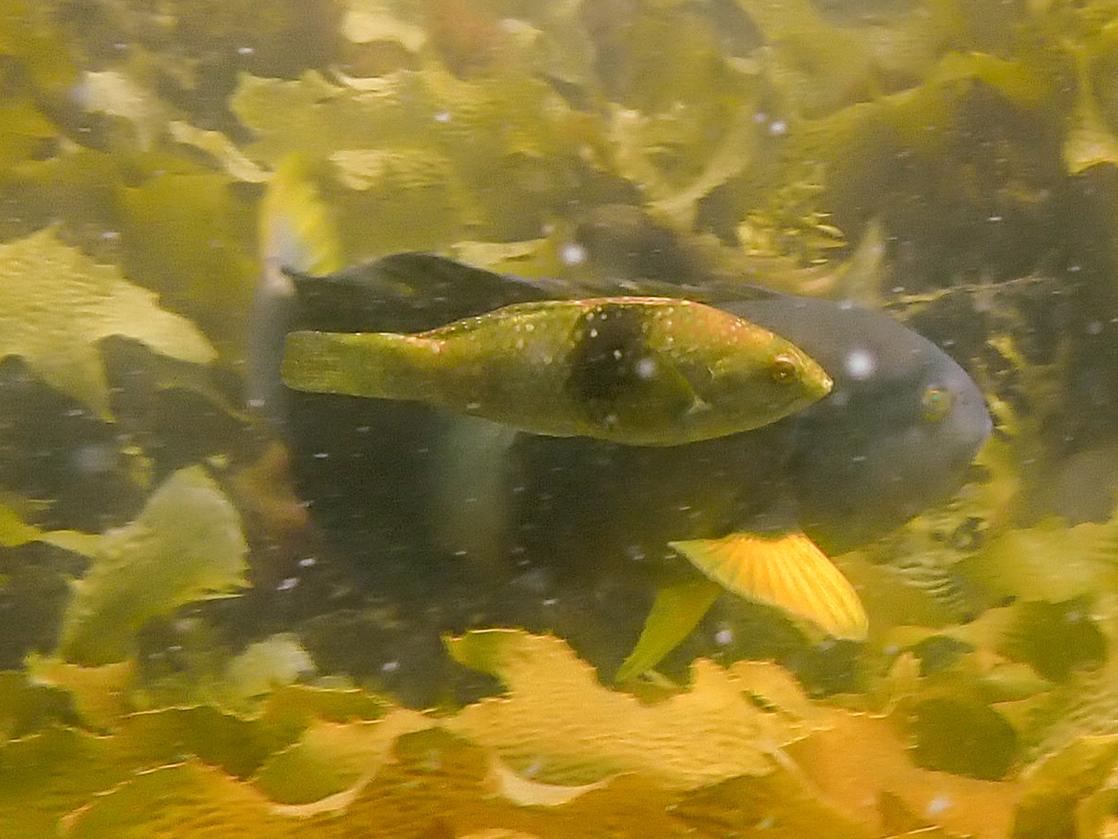
Initial phase (front) compared to terminal phase (back)

It is a carnivorous fish which mainly feeds on molluscs and crustaceans. The blue-throated wrasse is a protogynous hermaphrodite, females change sex into males, which happens after they attain 4 years of age, and this occurs in 12% of females each year. This oviparous species spawns in the spring and form pairs to do so. It lives in harems of a single large male and a number of females. This is a long-lived species which lives in excess of 15 years.

== Human usage ==
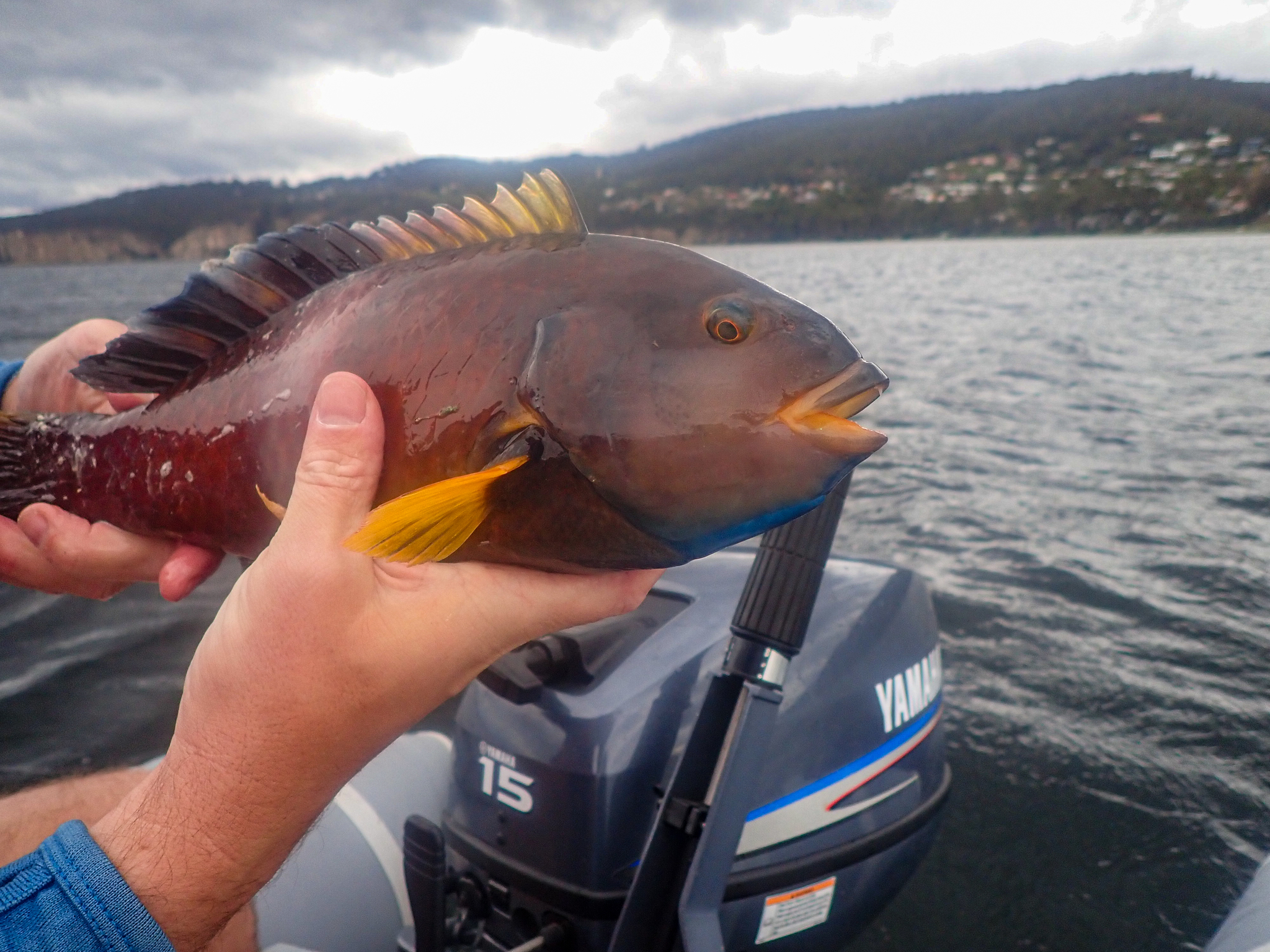
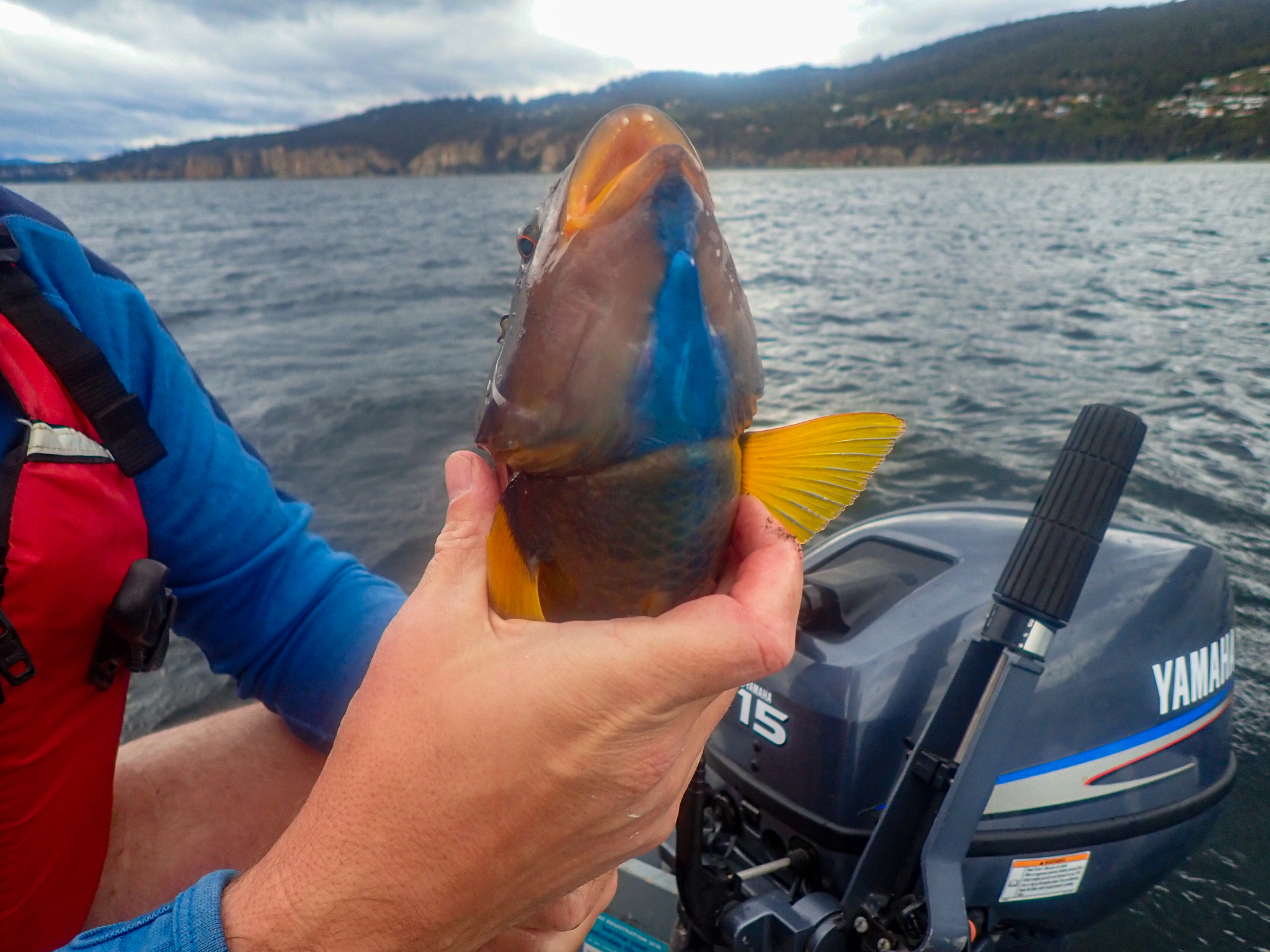
Terminal phase, showing the blue-coloured throat

Blue-throated wrasse are a quarry species for recreational and commercial fisheries. Live fish have been marketed since the early 1990s and the total catch of this species and of N. fucicola increased from less than 10 tonnes to nearly |60 tonnes in 1995/96. The main market is restaurants in Sydney. It is frequently caught using hook and line but it is also taken by trawlers and by commercial gillnets. Spearfishers also take this species, and it is common bycatch in lobster fisheries. Some states in Australia have set bag limits.

== Conservation ==
The blue-throated wrasse is subject to a minimum size limit in Vicorie (28 cm) and in Tasmania (30 cm) and fishing licenses are restricted in each of thee states. The biology of this species makes it vulnerable to fishing pressure as the large, territorial males are most easily taken and this leads to a reduction in breeding success and lower recruitment into the population, There are concerns that the larger minimum size for catch in Tasmania does not provide adequate protection.

Habitat deterioration caused by pollution and sedimentation may also affect this species.

== Gallery ==
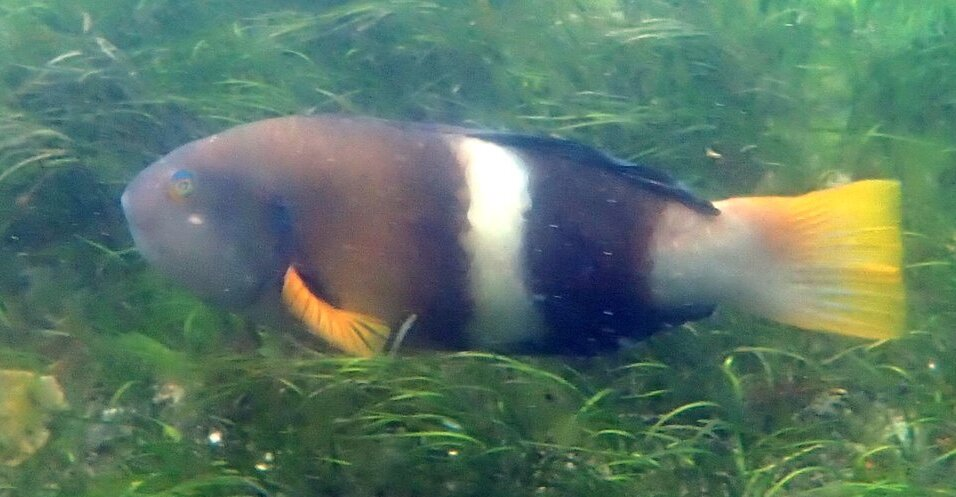
Terminal phase

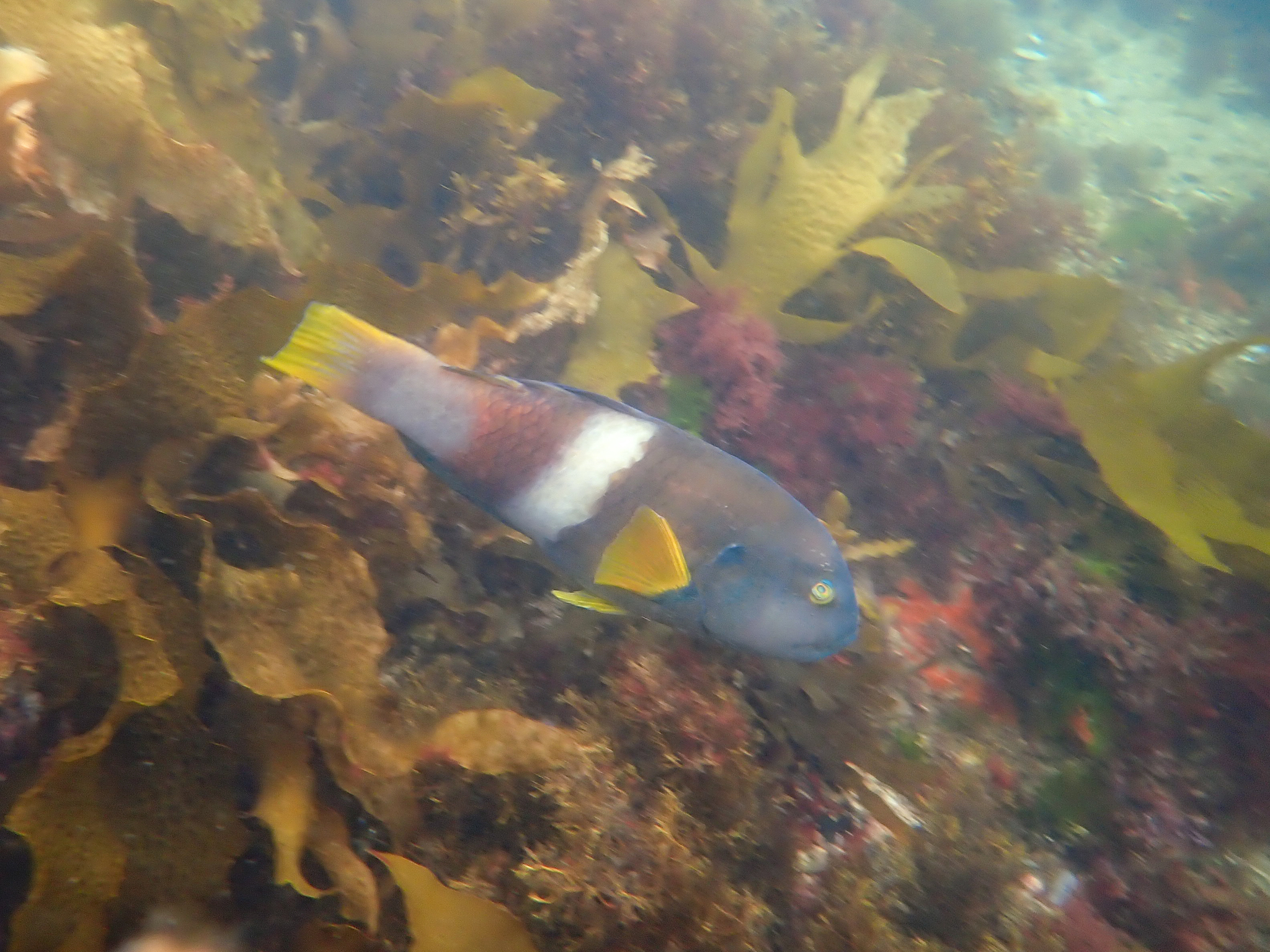
Terminal phase

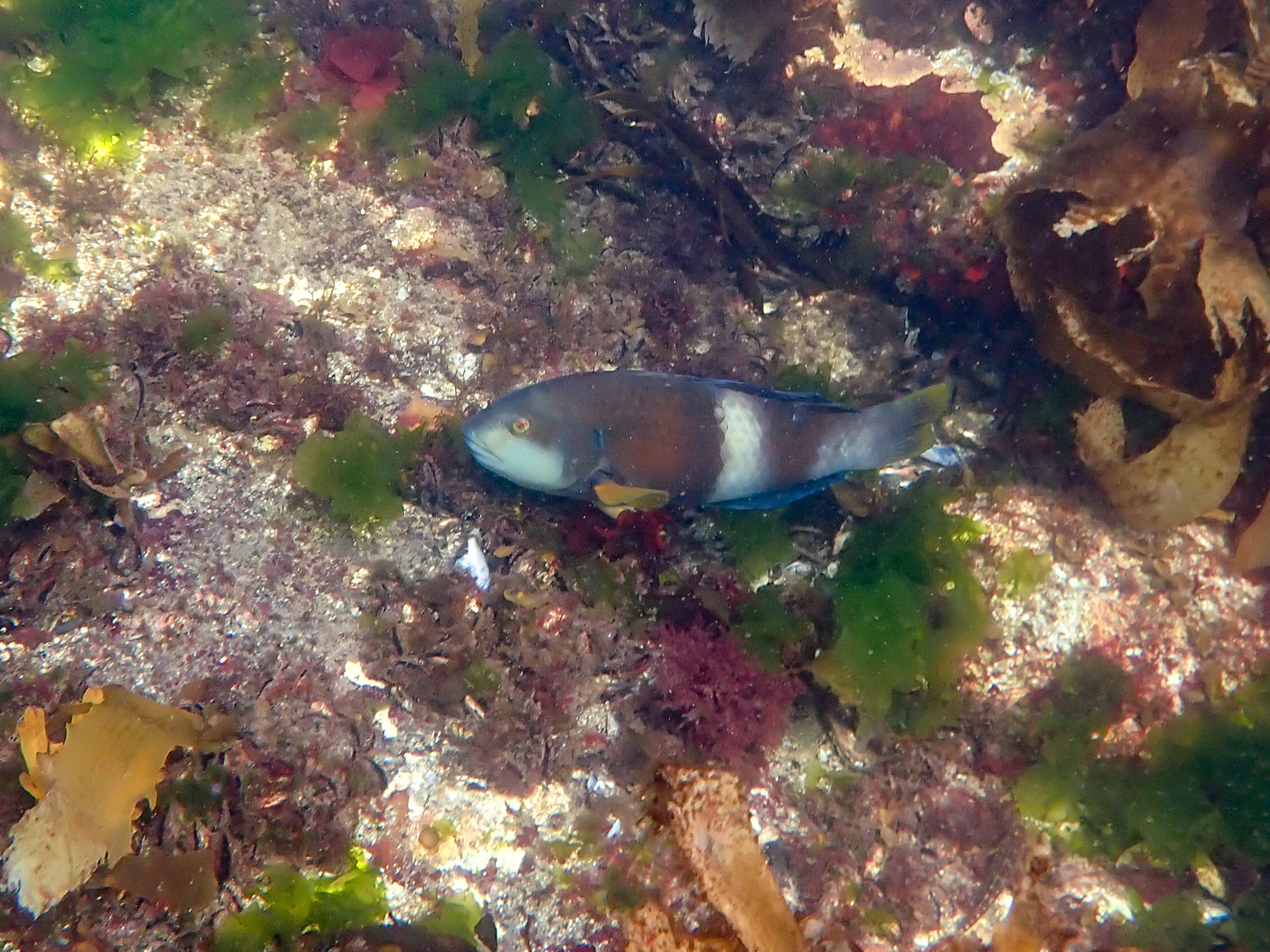
Terminal phase

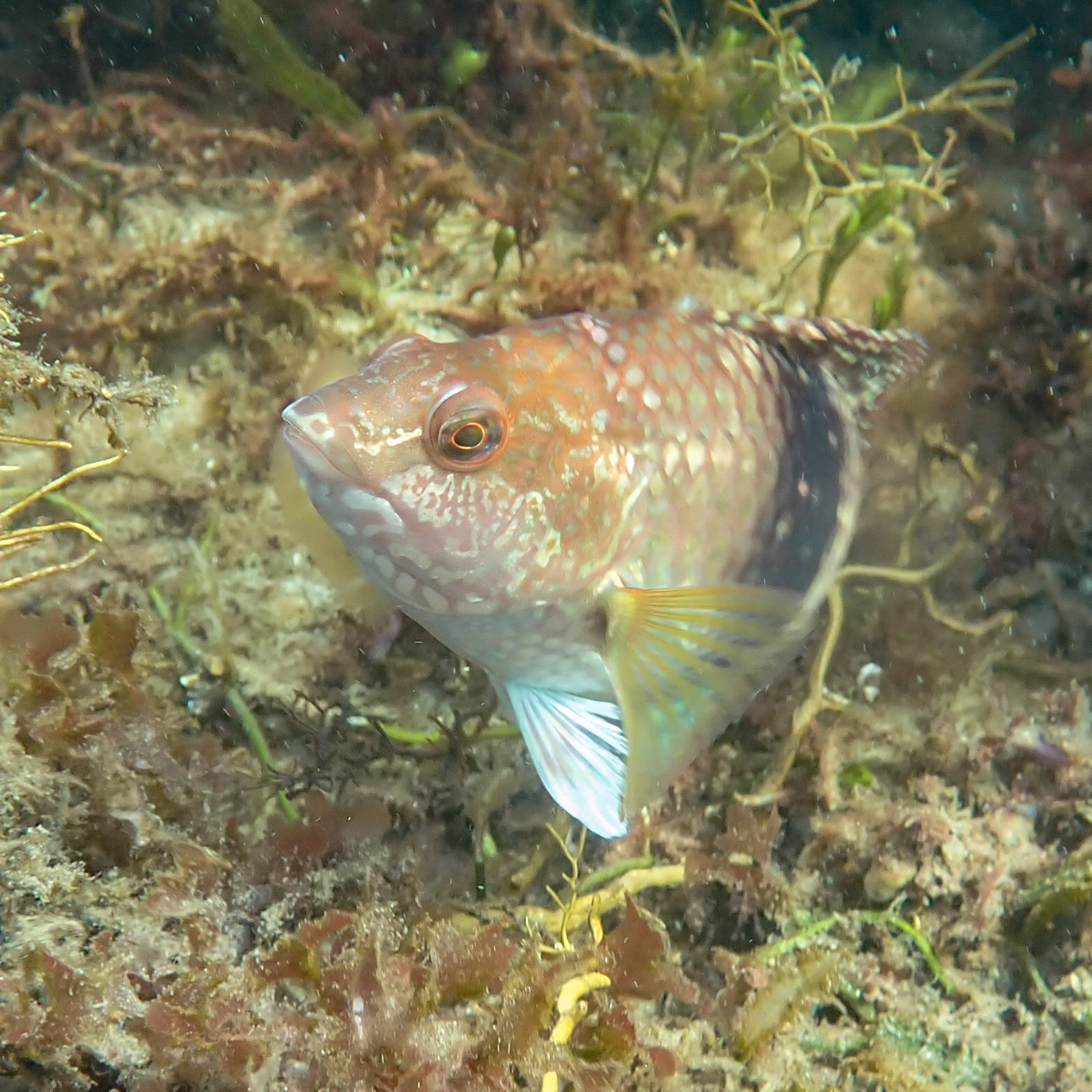
Initial phase

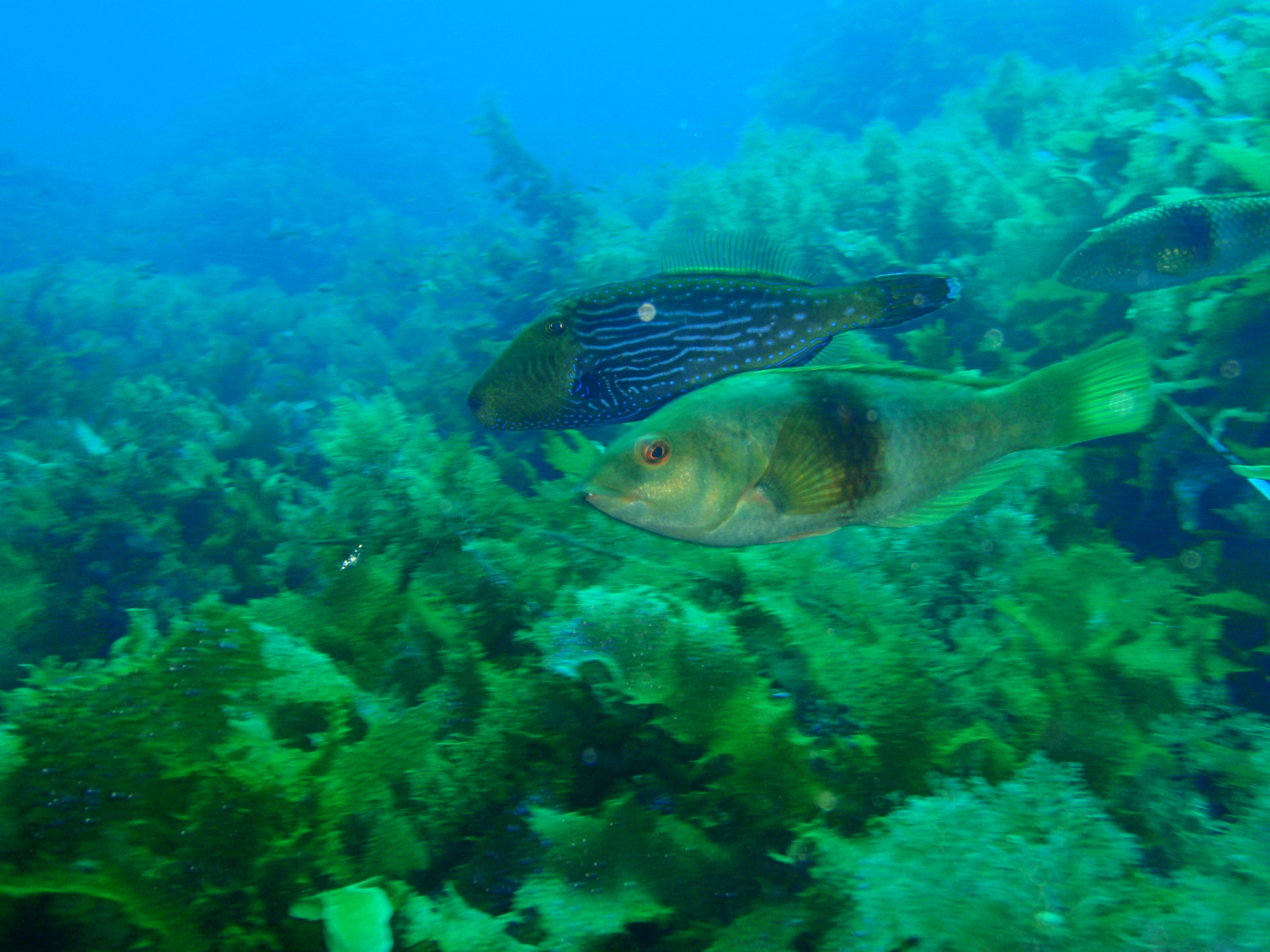
Initial phase, with a blue-lined leatherjacket (Meuschenia galii)

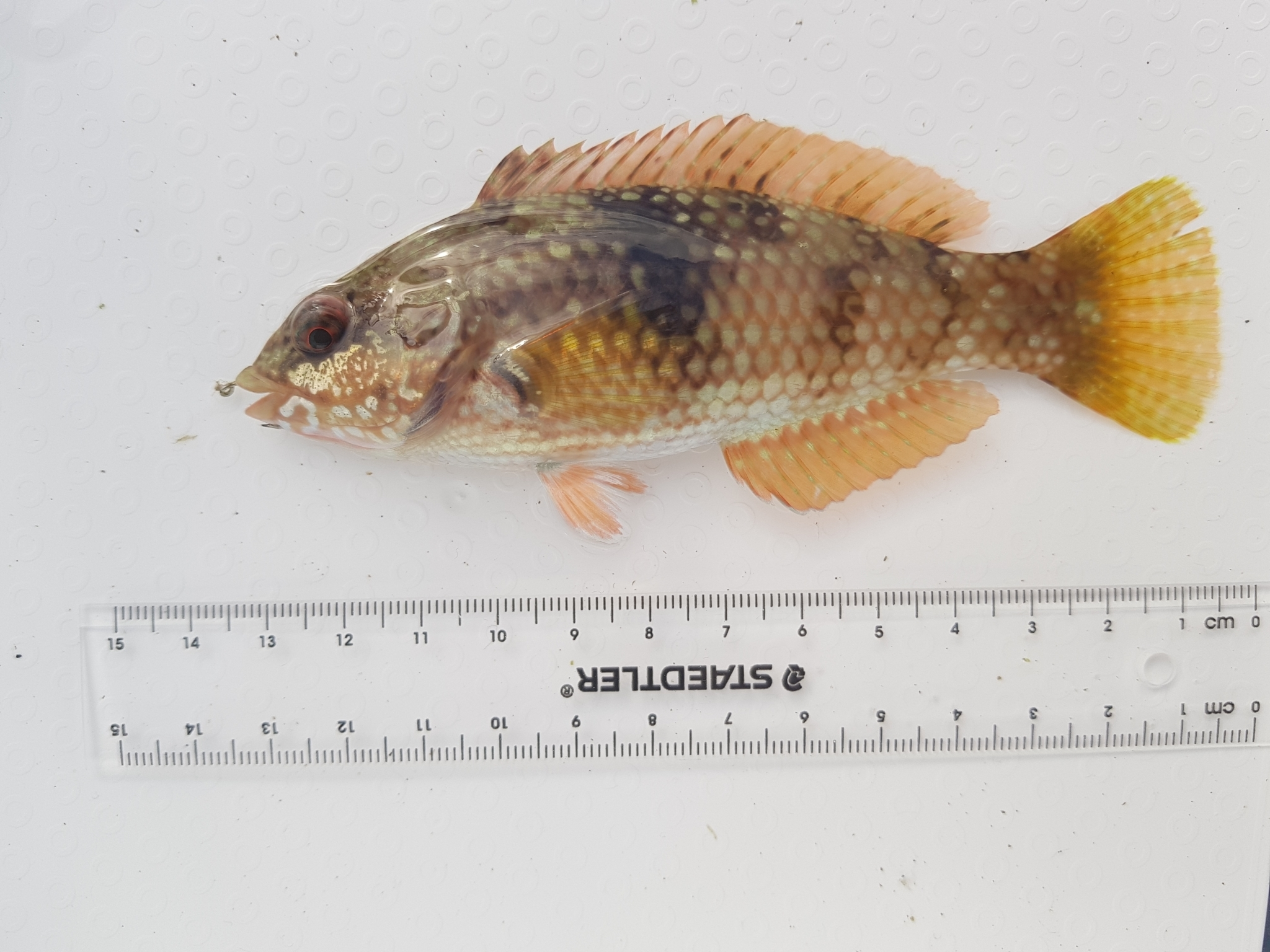
Juvenile

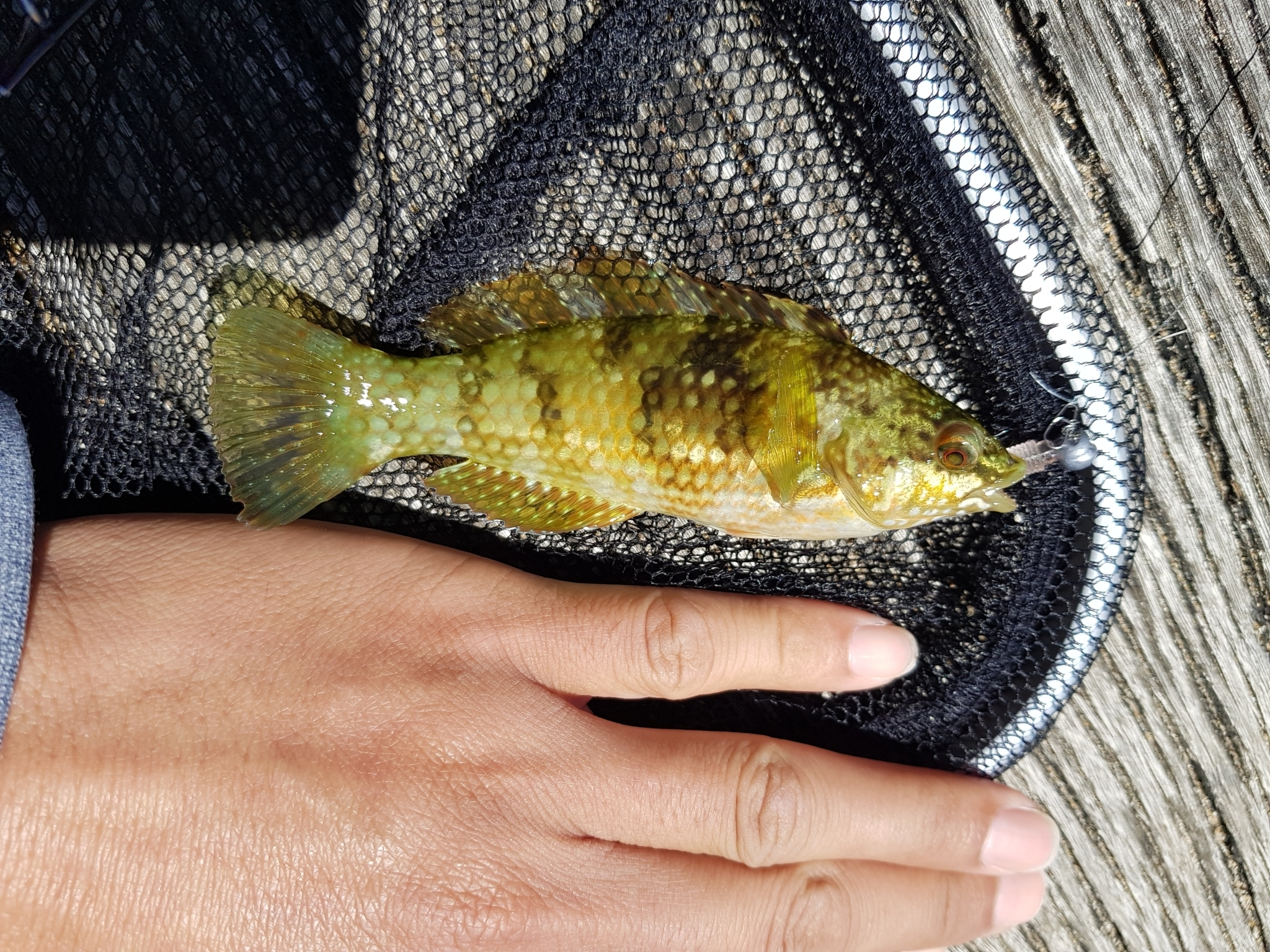
Juvenile

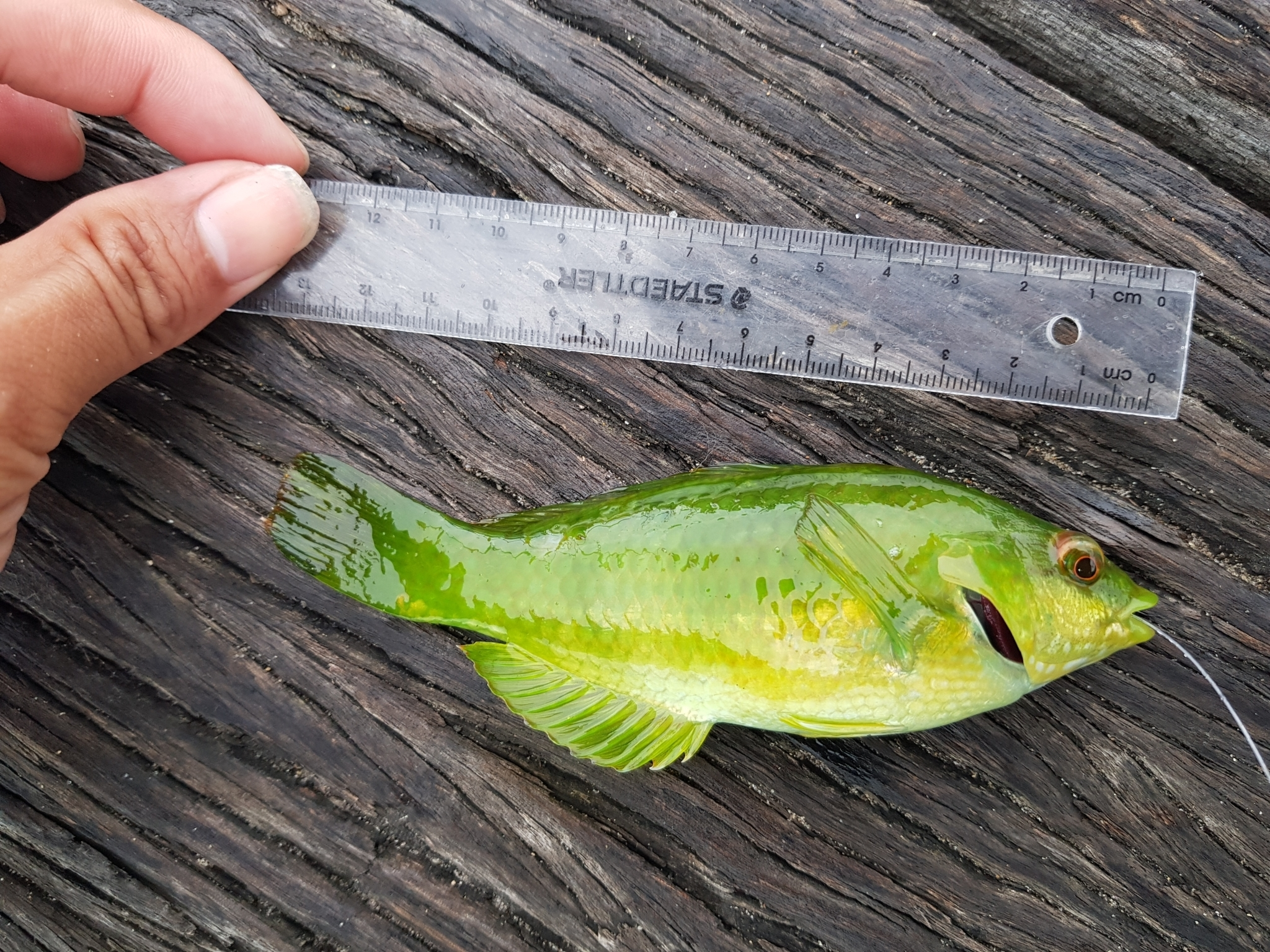
Juvenile
