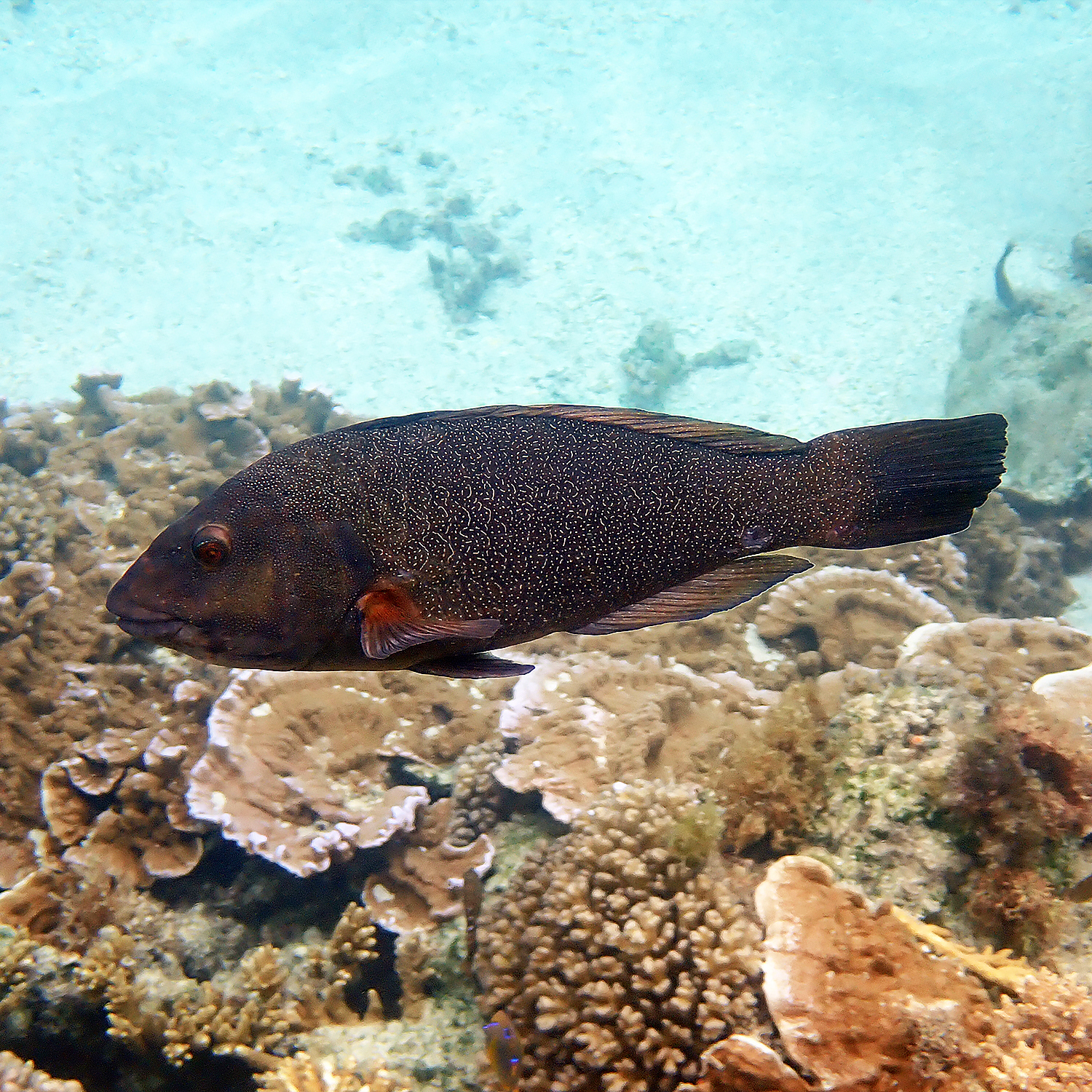
- Terminal phase
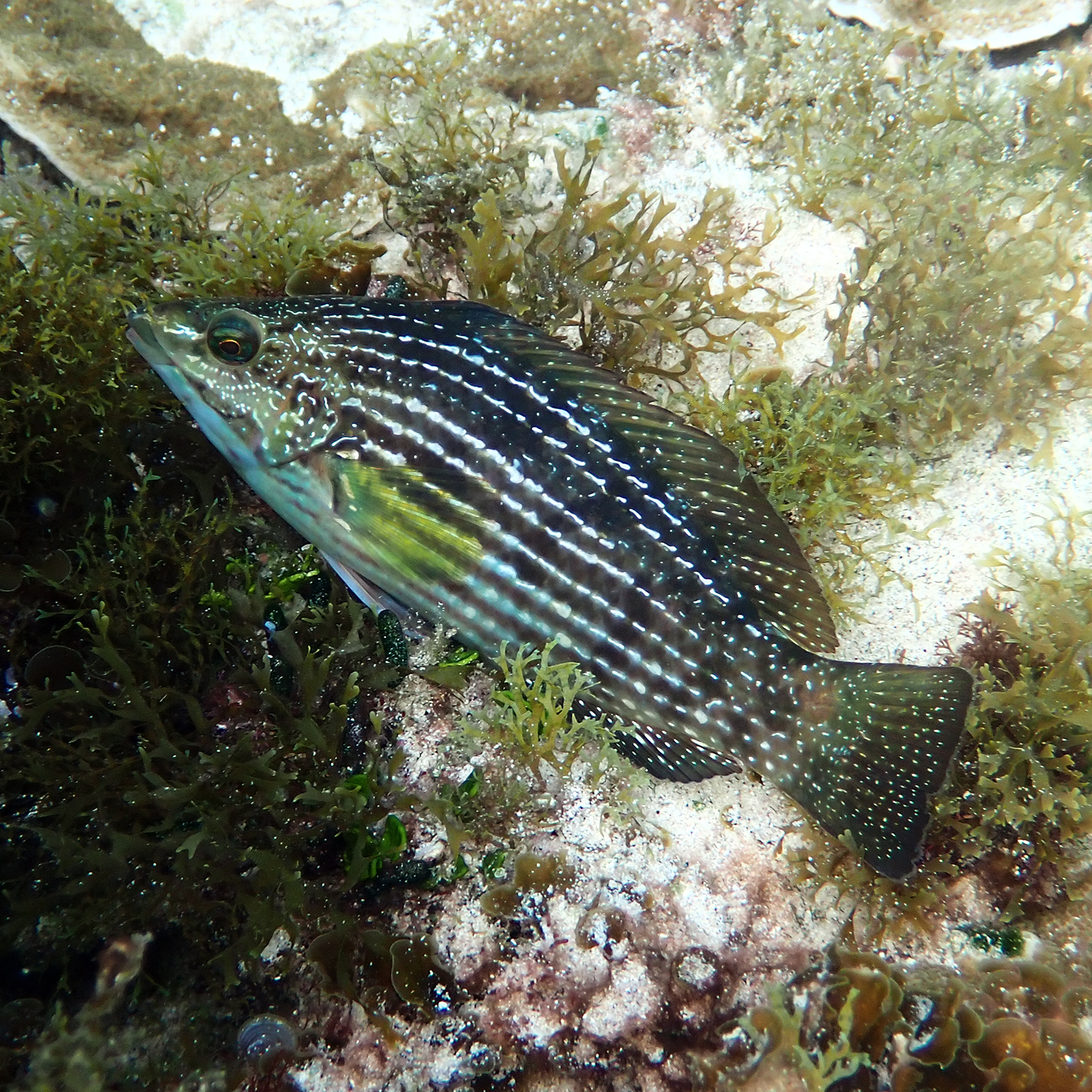
- Initial phase

Conservation status
- Least Concern (IUCN 3.1)

Scientific classification
- Kingdom: Animalia
- Phylum: Chordata
- Class: Actinopterygii
- Order: Labriformes
- Family: Labridae
- Genus: Notolabrus
- Species: N. inscriptus

Binomial name
- Notolabrus inscriptus (J. Richardson, 1848)

Synonyms
- Labrus inscriptus J. Richardson, 1848; Labrichthys inscripta (J. Richardson, 1848); Pseudolabrus inscriptus (J. Richardson, 1848); Tautoga inscripta J. Richardson, 1848 (ambiguous)

= Inscribed wrasse =

Species of fish

The inscribed wrasse (Notolabrus inscriptus) is a species of marine ray-finned fish from the family Labridae, the wrasses. It is found in the southwestern Pacific Ocean.

== Taxonomy ==
The inscribed wrasse was first formally described as Labrus inscriptus in 1848 by the Scottish naturalist John Richardson (1787-1865) with the type locality given as Norfolk Island. This species has been recorded as hybridising with Notolabrus fucicola.

== Description ==
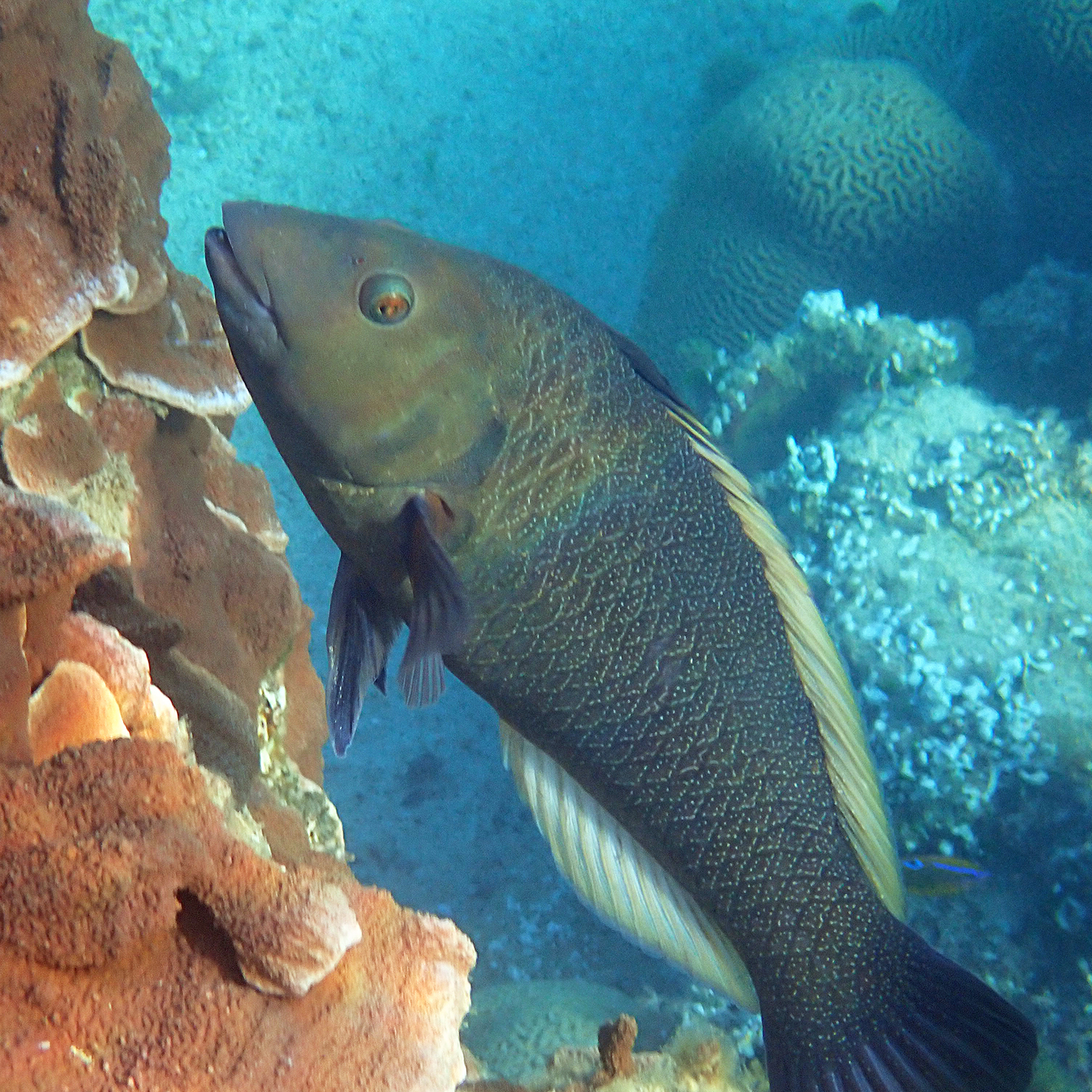
At Norfolk Island

The inscribed wrasse is a large species within its genus with the largest males measured at 325 mm in standard length; it is said to reach 50 cm (20 in) in standard length.

The small juvenile fish are greenish with white markings and an eyespot on the soft part of the dorsal fin and another on the anal fin. The females are brown with white markings on their scales that create thin longitudinal stripes. The males are bluish-grey in colour with the body showing an irregular pattern which resembles scribbles and which give rise to the species common and its specific name. The males also have white dorsal and anal fins.

== Distribution ==
The inscribed wrasse is native to eastern Australia including Lord Howe Island and Norfolk Island, the Kermadec Islands, and the northeast coast of the North Island in New Zealand where its range extends from Cape Reinga to East Cape. This is an uncommon species off Australian coasts but is abundant off Lord Howe Island, Norfolk Island and the Kermadecs.

== Habitat and biology ==
The inscribed wrasses can be found around kelp beds on rocky reefs at depths around 17 m (56 ft). It is carnivorous, feeding on benthic invertebrates mostly molluscs and crustaceans. Like other species in the genus Notolabrus the males of this species form harems within a territory defended by a male, in this species harems average six females or juveniles.

== Gallery ==
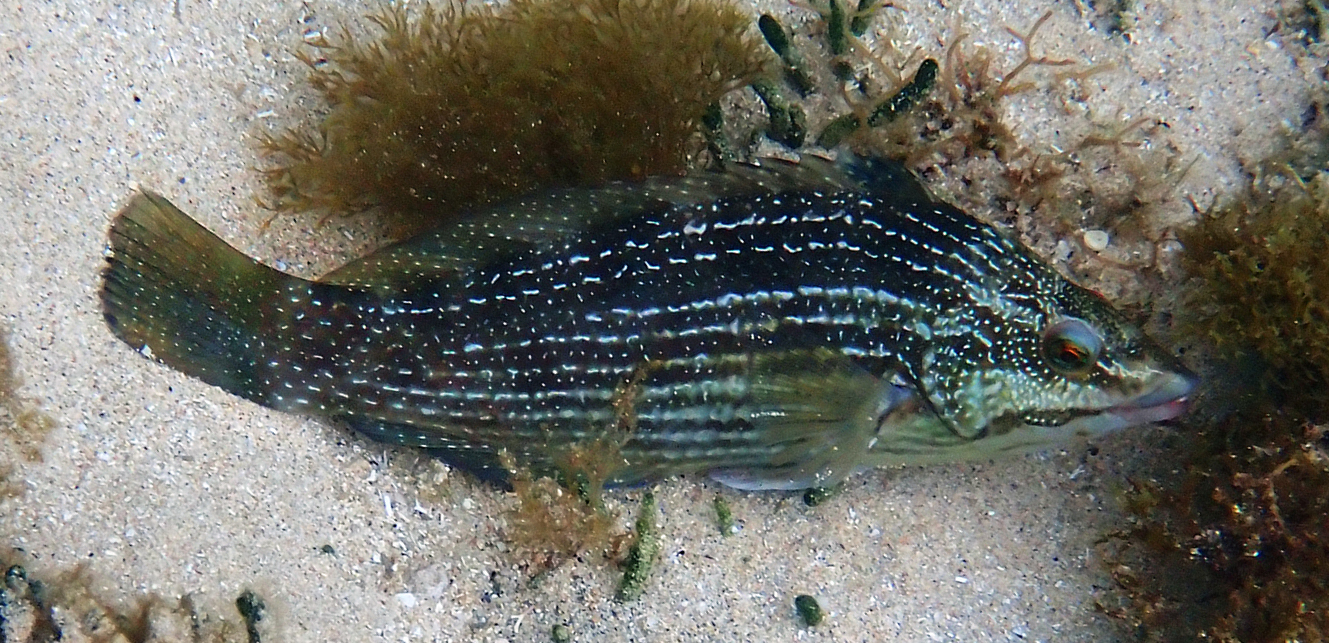
Initial phase

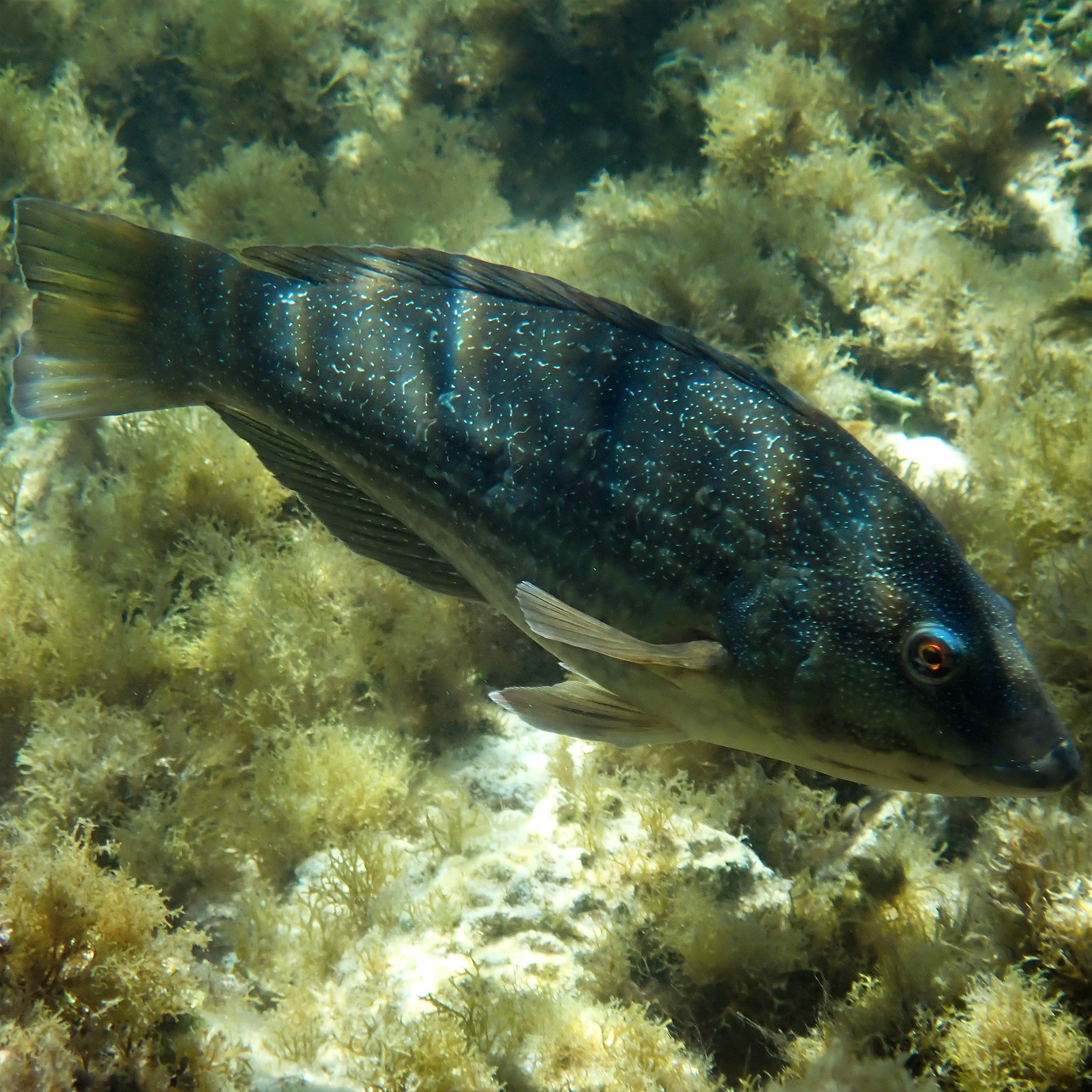
Transitioning between initial and terminal phase

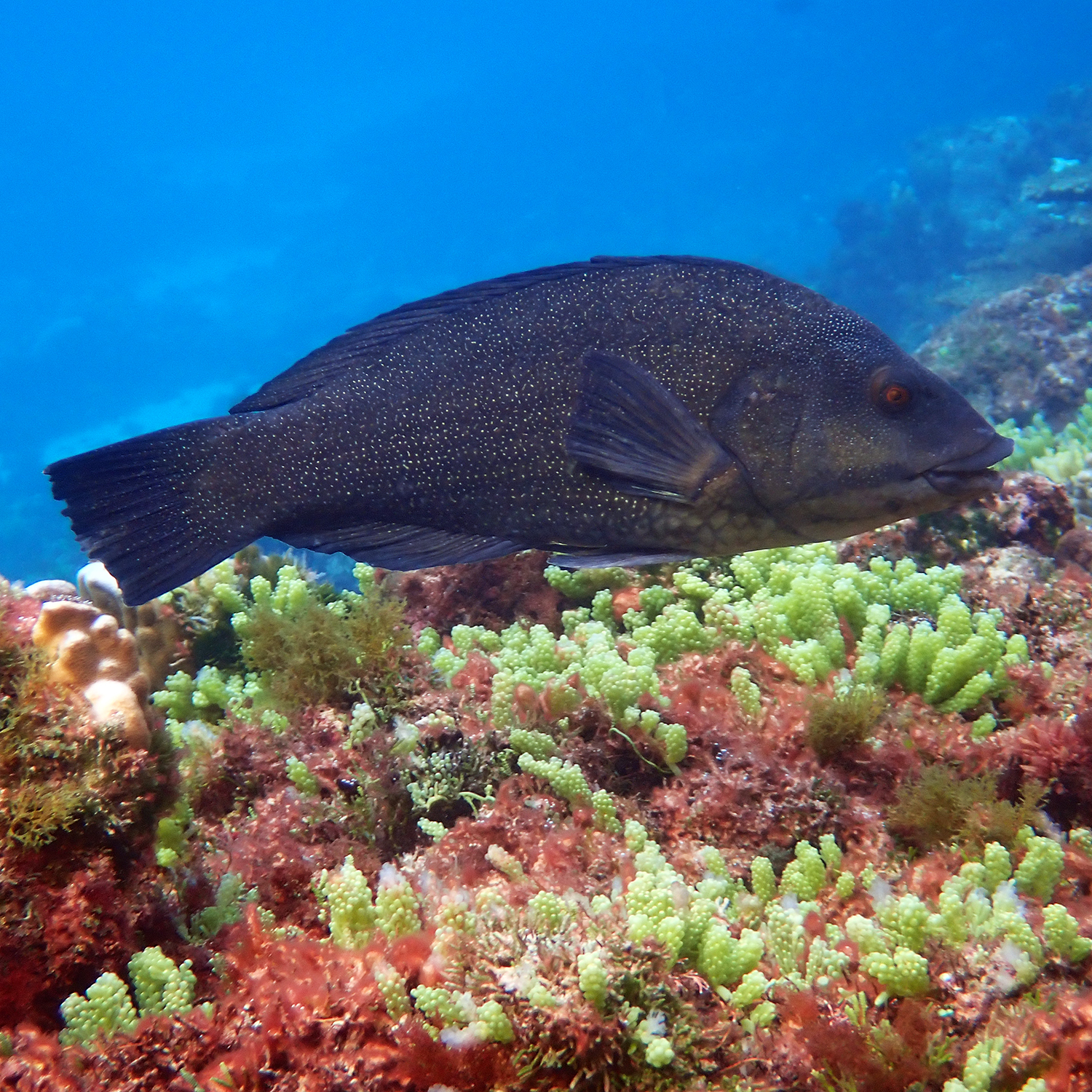
Terminal phase
