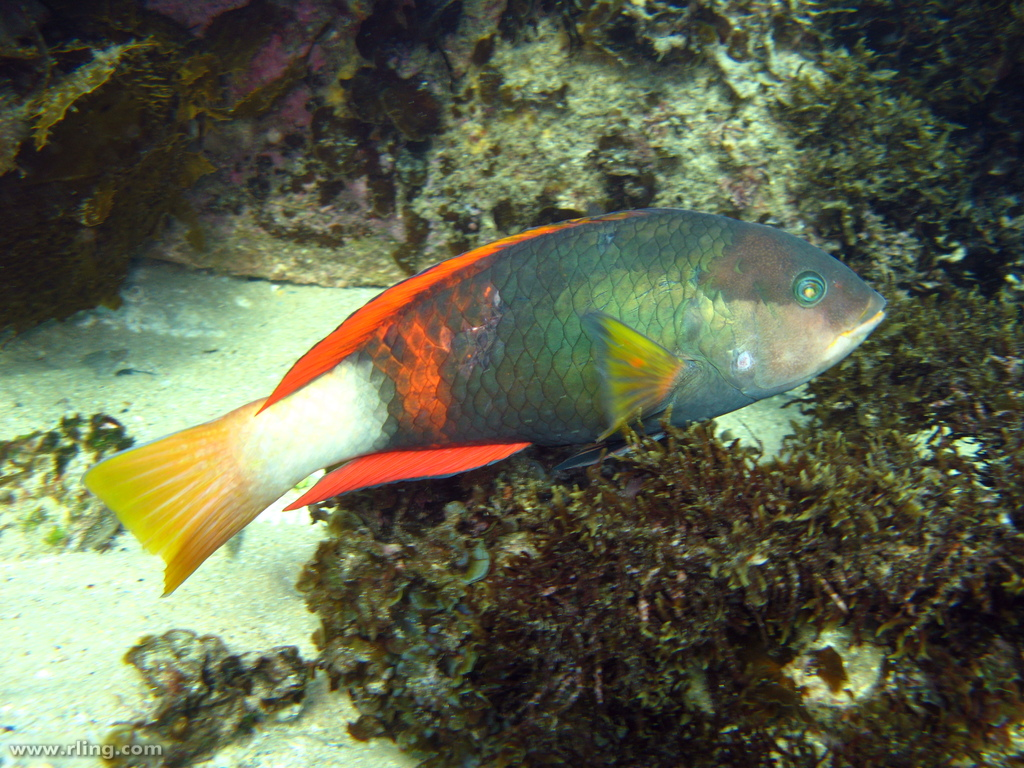
- male
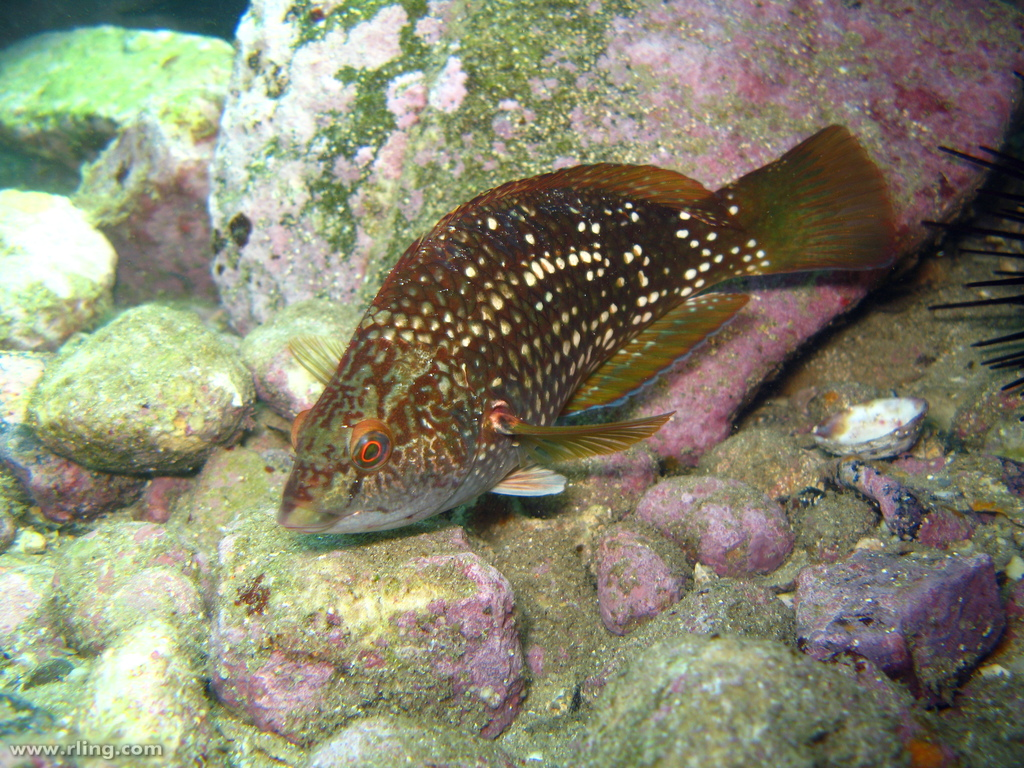
- female

Conservation status
- Least Concern (IUCN 3.1)

Scientific classification
- Kingdom: Animalia
- Phylum: Chordata
- Class: Actinopterygii
- Division: Teleostei
- Order: Labriformes
- Family: Labridae
- Genus: Notolabrus
- Species: N. gymnogenis

Binomial name
- Notolabrus gymnogenis (Günther, 1862)

Synonyms
- Notolabrus gymnogenis (Günther, 1862); Pseudolabrus cyprinaceous Whitley, 1931; Labrichthys gymnogenis Günther, 1862; Pseudolabrus gymnogenis (Günther, 1862); Labrichthys nigromarginatus Macleay, 1878; Pseudolabrus nigromarginatus (Macleay, 1878)

= Notolabrus gymnogenis =

Species of fish

Notolabrus gymnogenis, commonly known as the crimson banded wrasse, is a species of fish in the family Labridae. This colourful fish is endemic to Eastern Australia.

== Description ==
This species grows to ~40 cm, and is like many wrasses, its colour changes over different stages of its life. Juveniles are greenish brown with rows of white spots along the sides. Females are reddish to brownish-orange with rows of white spots along the sides. Males are brightly coloured with red dorsal and anal fins, a red band around the rear of the body, a white caudal peduncle and a yellow caudal fin. The largest male recorded had a standard length of 23 centimetres (9.1 in).

== Biology ==
Notolabrus gymnogenis, like other wrasses, utilizes suction to bring food into its mouth. This is accompanied by crushing teeth that it uses to get through the shells of its prey, primarily decapods. propels itself through the water with its ray fins. These fins are not connected to the main skeleton, instead they attach to the fish through muscles and ligaments. The fins themselves are made up of bone-like rays that can articulate to change the area of the fin. This allows this fish to have highly precise locomotion. This fish is protogynous, being born female and changing sex to a male later on in life, at a standard length of 13–20 centimetres (5.1–7.9 in). This change is linked to complex brain changes resulting from natural maturation and environmental pressures. The males gather a harem of around 10 females and juveniles into their territory. This is an oviparous fish which forms pairs to spawn.

== Distribution ==
The fish is found in coastal waters of eastern Australia from Hervey Bay, Queensland to Lakes Entrance, Victoria and also in Tasmania. It has also been recorded from Lord Howe Island. They typically favor cooler waters in the region of South Eastern Australia where they are most commonly found. While found in both deep and shallow reefs they typically favor deeper waters. When water temperature increases in their habitat they move to cooler areas within their range. As a result, their populations have declined in shallow reefs and increased in deep inshore reefs as a consequence of global ocean temperatures increasing with climate change.

== Conservation ==
Like all fish that inhabit Australia's coastal waters, Notolabrus gymnogenis faces habitat loss from climate change. The Great Barrier Reef has degraded greatly as a consequence of anthropogenic climate change. Since 2016, there have been five major coral bleaching events.

== Behaviour ==
Males are territorial and will defend a territory against other males. When feeding, small Notolabrus gymnogenis favored ambush hunting to consume amphipods, decapods, and gastropods. Larger individuals prefer to patrol exposed sections of rocky reefs for larger decapods. In addition to solo hunting, they will sometimes utilize multi-species fish foraging associations. They will pair up with an octopus to catch prey flushed out of spaces only the octopus can reach. During this interaction, the fish will not hunt the octopus and will drive away other fish attempting to pair up with the octopus. There is no active cooperation between the two species, rather the fish is following the octopus because it makes more prey available and the octopus does not protest because the fish is not bothering it. Human interference with Notolabrus gymnogenis causes an increase in caution. Individuals that live in protected areas, where fishing is not allowed, and half as cautious of potential predators than fish living in fished areas. It is theorized that increased caution is a learned response to near misses with humans. Larger fishes were cautious of potential predators, however, the reason is still not entirely clear.

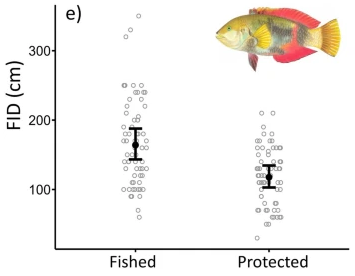
The FID (distance a predator can approach before the prey animal flees) of Crimson Banded Wrasse in fish v.s. protected areas.

== Distribution ==
Notolabrus gymnogenis are benthic coastal reef inhabitants and are commonly found on reef in New South Wales. Found in depths of 4–53 metres (13–174 ft). They typically favor cooler waters in the region of South Eastern Australia where they are most commonly found. While found in both deep and shallow reefs they typically favor deeper waters. When water temperature increases in their habitat they move to cooler areas within their range. As a result, their populations have declined in shallow reefs and increased in deep inshore reefs as a consequence of global ocean temperatures increasing with climate change.

== Human usage ==
Notolabrus gymnogenis is a quarry for recreational fishing and has also been recorded being sold commercially in the Sydney Fish market 2005.
