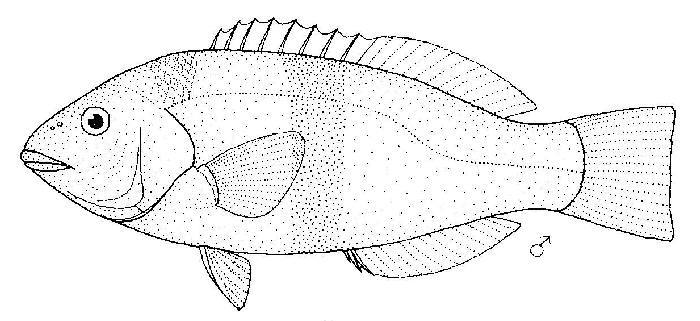
- Drawing by Dr Tony Ayling

Conservation status
- Least Concern (IUCN 3.1)

Scientific classification
- Kingdom: Animalia
- Phylum: Chordata
- Class: Actinopterygii
- Order: Labriformes
- Family: Labridae
- Genus: Notolabrus
- Species: N. cinctus

Binomial name
- Notolabrus cinctus (F. W. Hutton, 1877)

Synonyms
- Labrichthys cincta F. W. Hutton, 1877; Pseudolabrus cinctus (F. W. Hutton, 1877)

= Girdled wrasse =

Species of fish

The girdled wrasse, Notolabrus cinctus, is a species of wrasse native to the waters around the South Island and southeastern North Island of New Zealand, including the Chatham Islands and Snares Islands, where it can be found at depths from 15 to 91 m (49 to 299 ft). The males of this species can reach 29.9 cm (11.8 in) in standard length, while the females only reach 29.1 cm (11.5 in). There are two colour phases with older fish developing a large, dusky belt around the body. This is not associated with changing sex which happens about three years after the development of the belt. They feed on molluscs and small crustacea. They occur on rocky reefs, where they are common.
