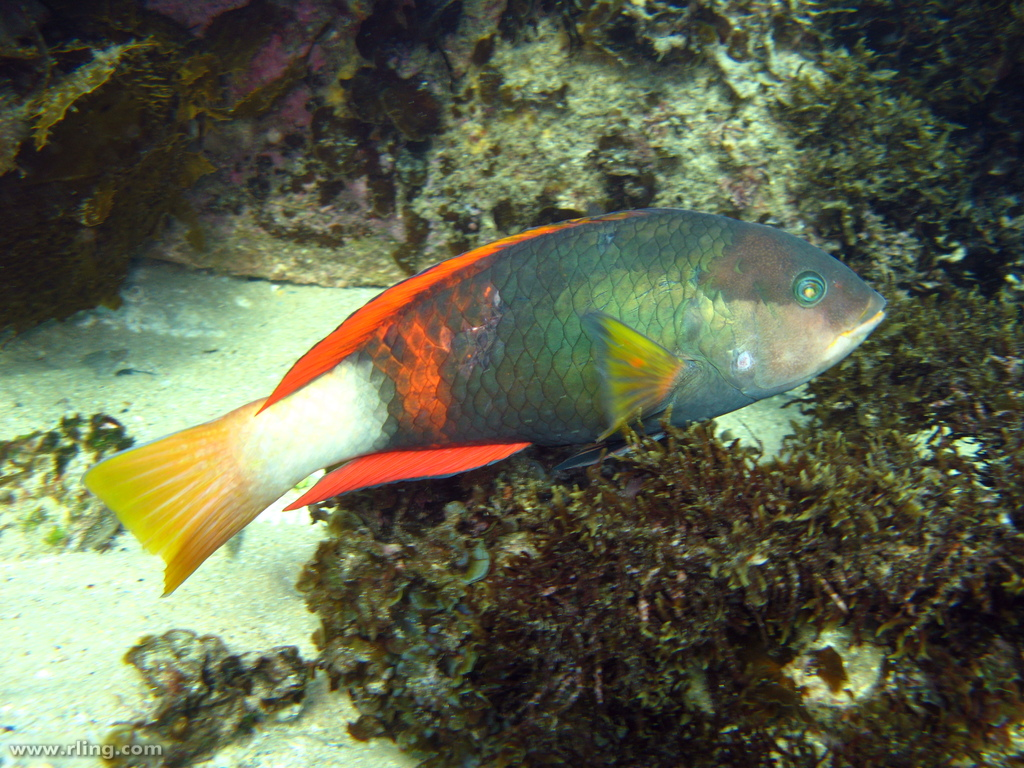
- Crimsonband wrasse (N. gymnogenis), male

Scientific classification
- Kingdom: Animalia
- Phylum: Chordata
- Class: Actinopterygii
- Order: Labriformes
- Family: Labridae
- Subfamily: Pseudolabrinae
- Genus: Notolabrus; B. C. Russell, 1988

Type species
- Labrus fucicola J. Richardson, 1840

= Notolabrus =

Genus of fishes

Notolabrus is a genus of wrasses native to the eastern Indian Ocean and the southwestern Pacific Ocean from Australia to New Zealand.

== Species ==
The seven currently recognized species in this genus are:

Species	Common name	Image (terminal phase)
Notolabrus celidotus (Bloch & J. G. Schneider, 1801)	spotty	
Notolabrus cinctus (F. W. Hutton, 1877)	girdled wrasse	
Notolabrus fucicola (J. Richardson, 1840)	banded parrotfish, yellow-saddled wrasse	
Notolabrus gymnogenis (Günther, 1862)	crimsonband wrasse	
Notolabrus inscriptus (J. Richardson, 1848)	inscribed wrasse	
Notolabrus parilus (J. Richardson, 1850)	brown-spotted wrasse	
Notolabrus tetricus (J. Richardson, 1840)	blue-throated wrasse	
