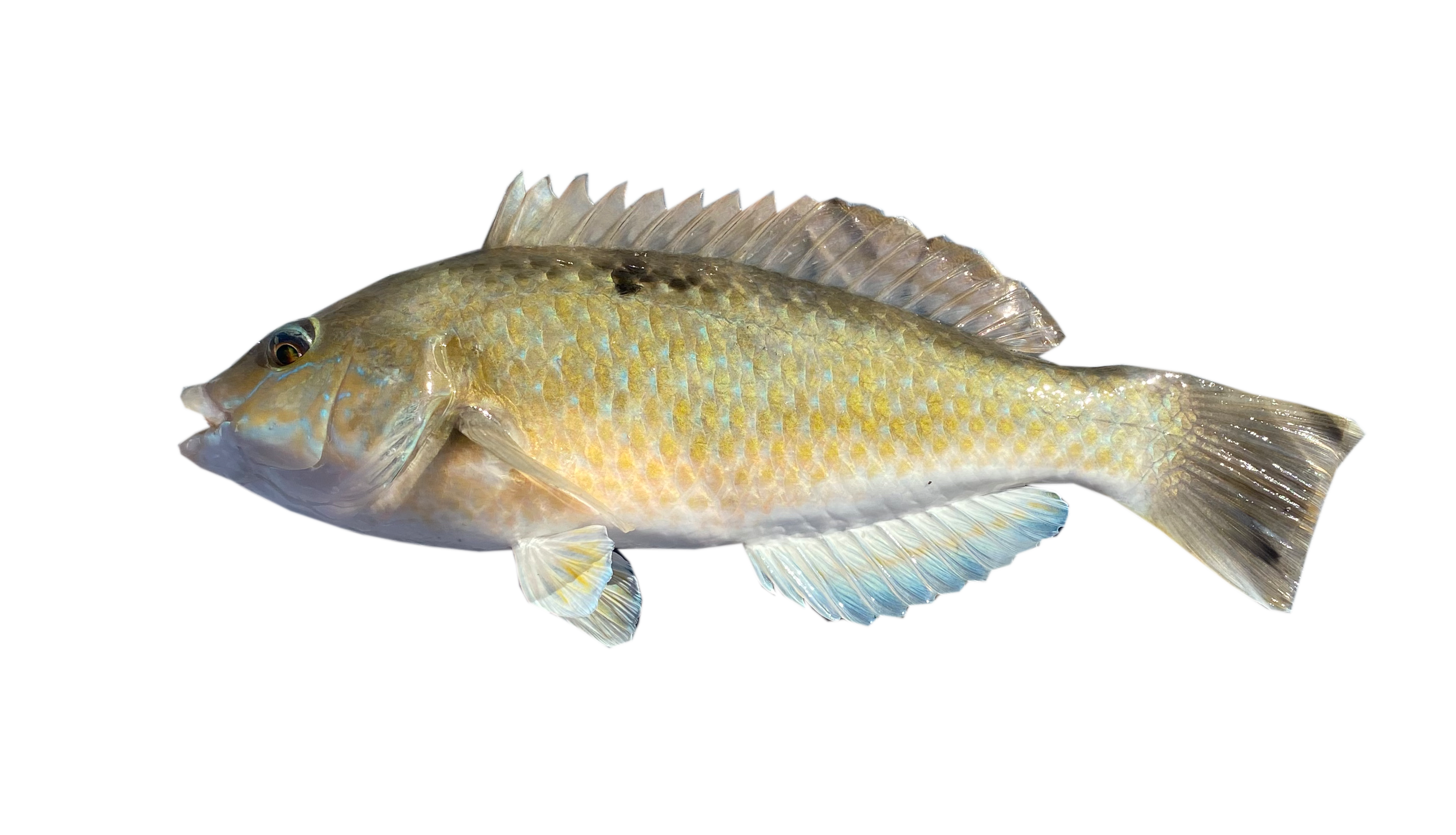

Conservation status
- Least Concern (IUCN 3.1)

Scientific classification
- Kingdom: Animalia
- Phylum: Chordata
- Class: Actinopterygii
- Order: Labriformes
- Family: Labridae
- Genus: Notolabrus
- Species: N. celidotus

Binomial name
- Notolabrus celidotus (Bloch & J. G. Schneider, 1801)

Synonyms
- Labrus celidotus Bloch & J. G. Schneider, 1801; Julis celidotus (Bloch & J. G. Schneider, 1801); Labrichthys celidota (Bloch & J. G. Schneider, 1801); Pseudolabrus celidotus (Bloch & J. G. Schneider, 1801); Labrus poecilopleura Valenciennes, 1839; Labrus botryocosmus J. Richardson, 1846; Labrichthys botryocosmus (J. Richardson, 1846)

= Spotty (fish) =

Species of fish

The spotty or paketi (Notolabrus celidotus) is a species of wrasse endemic to the waters around New Zealand, including Stewart Island and the surrounding areas. It can be found on reefs at depths from 22 to 145 m (72 to 476 ft), though most common in shallower parts of that range. This species can reach 23.9 cm (9.4 in) in standard length.

== Names ==
In English, Notolabrus celidotus is commonly known as the paketi or the spotty. In the indigenous Māori language, it is known as paketi or pākirikiri (also spelt paekirikiri).

== Biology ==
Like other wrasses, spotties begin life as females. Once they reach a length of 13–19 cm at the age of 3–4 years, some of the largest fish may turn into males. Male spotties stake out territories in which they maintain a harem of roughly 20 females that they aggressively defend from other males. When a male dies, the dominant female in the harem will change sex over a few days and take over control of both the harem and territory. This social structure keeps the sex ratio strongly biased towards females. Spawning usually occurs from late July to the end of October.

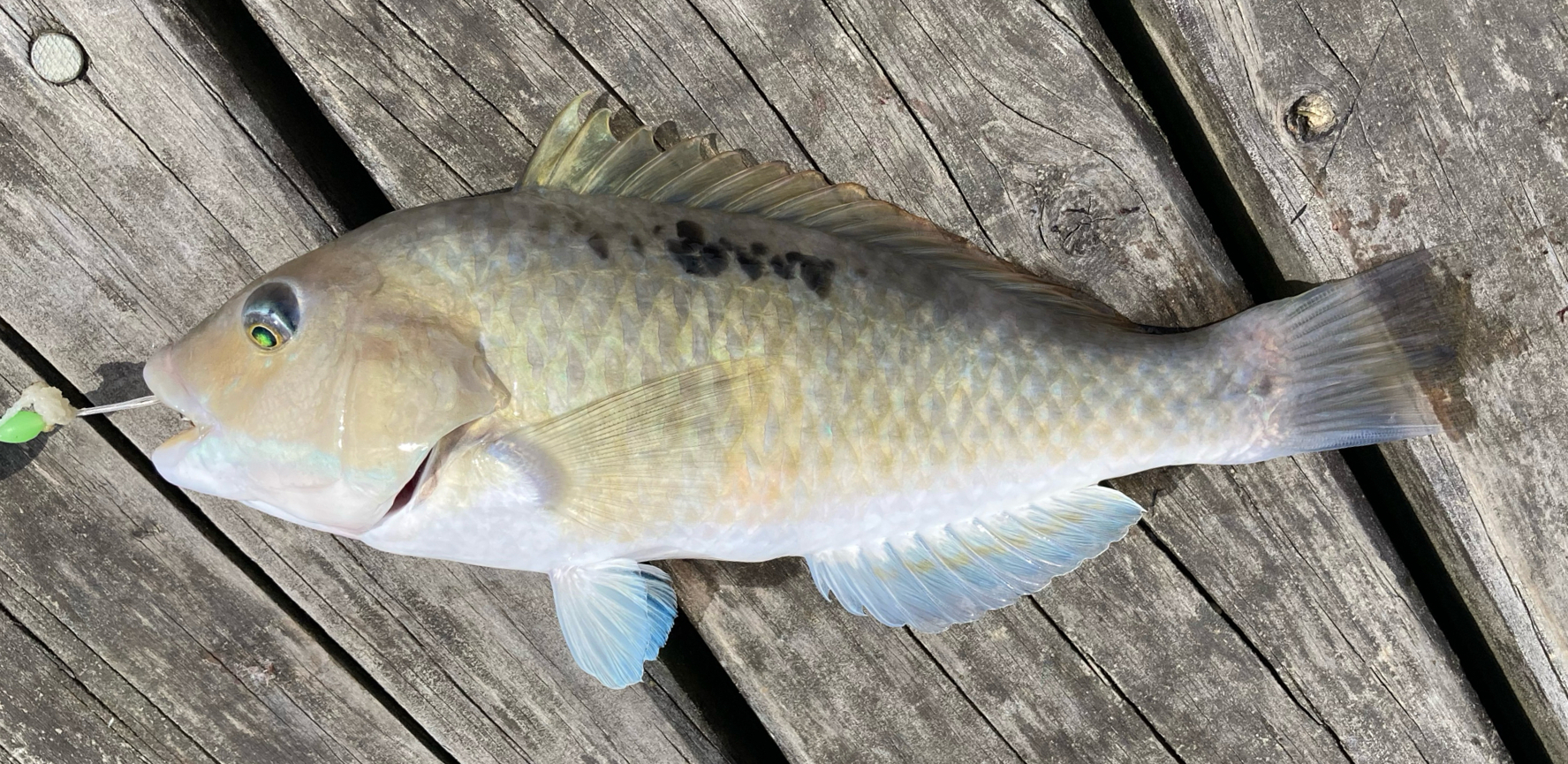
Terminal phase

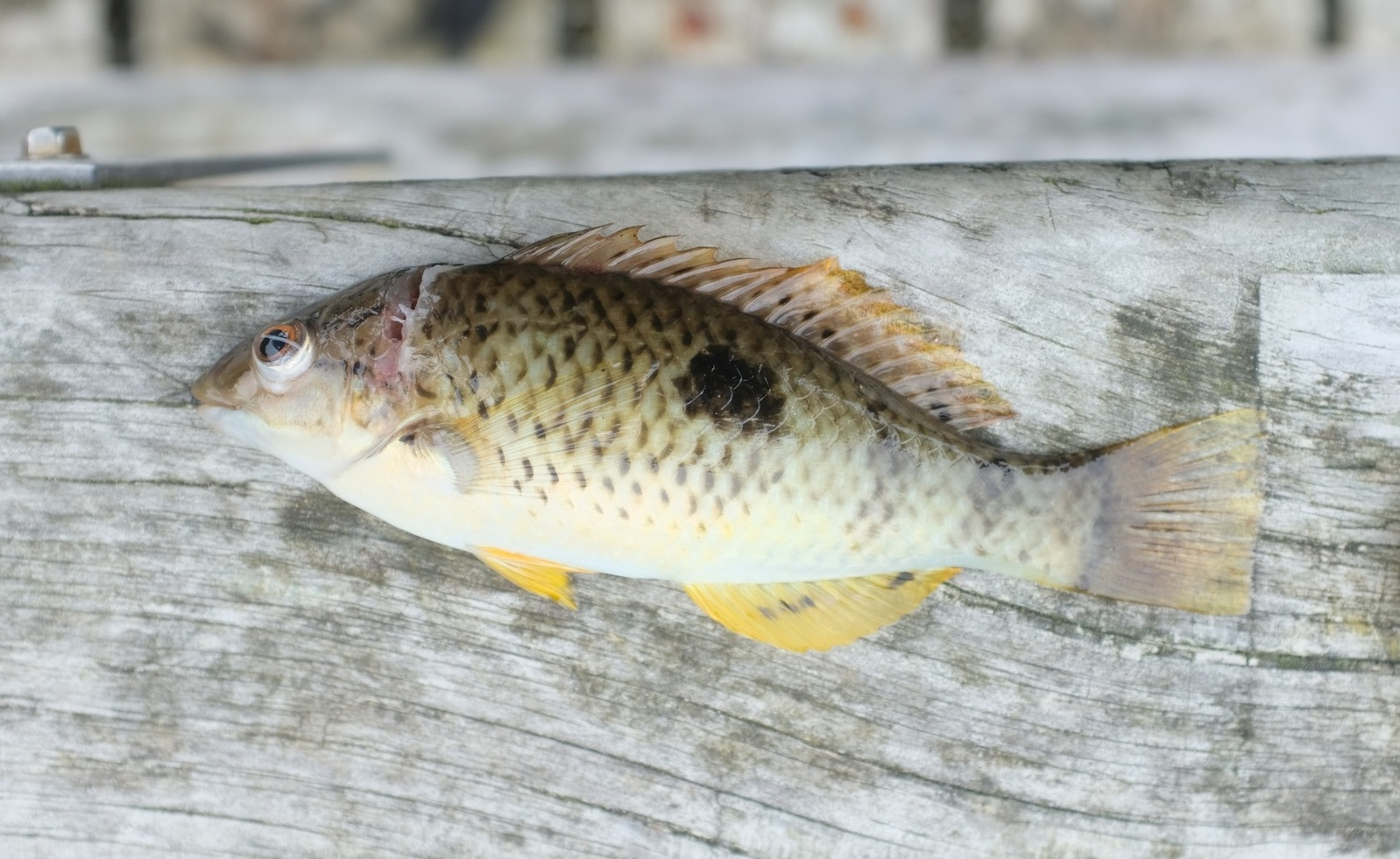
Initial phase
