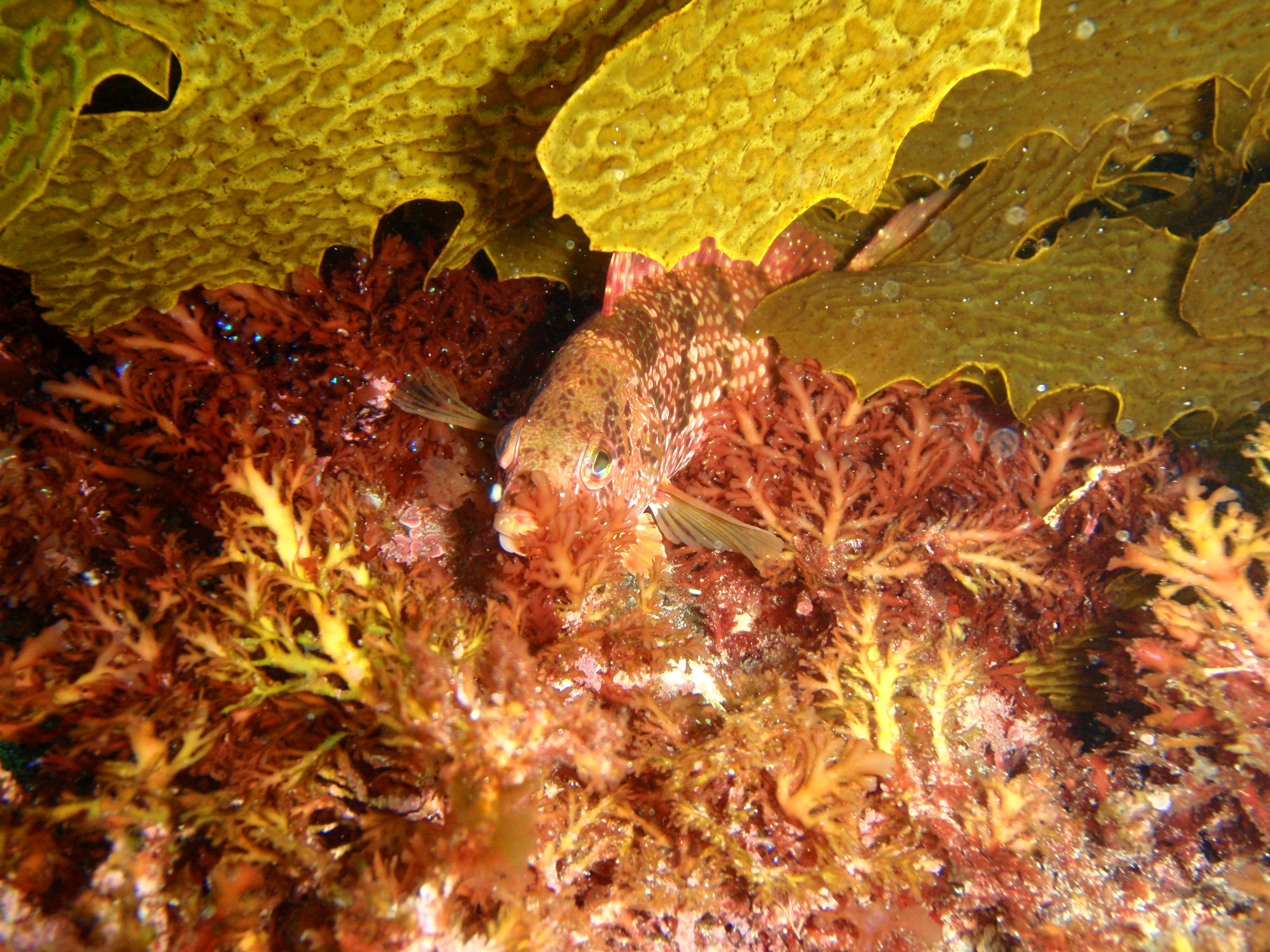
- female
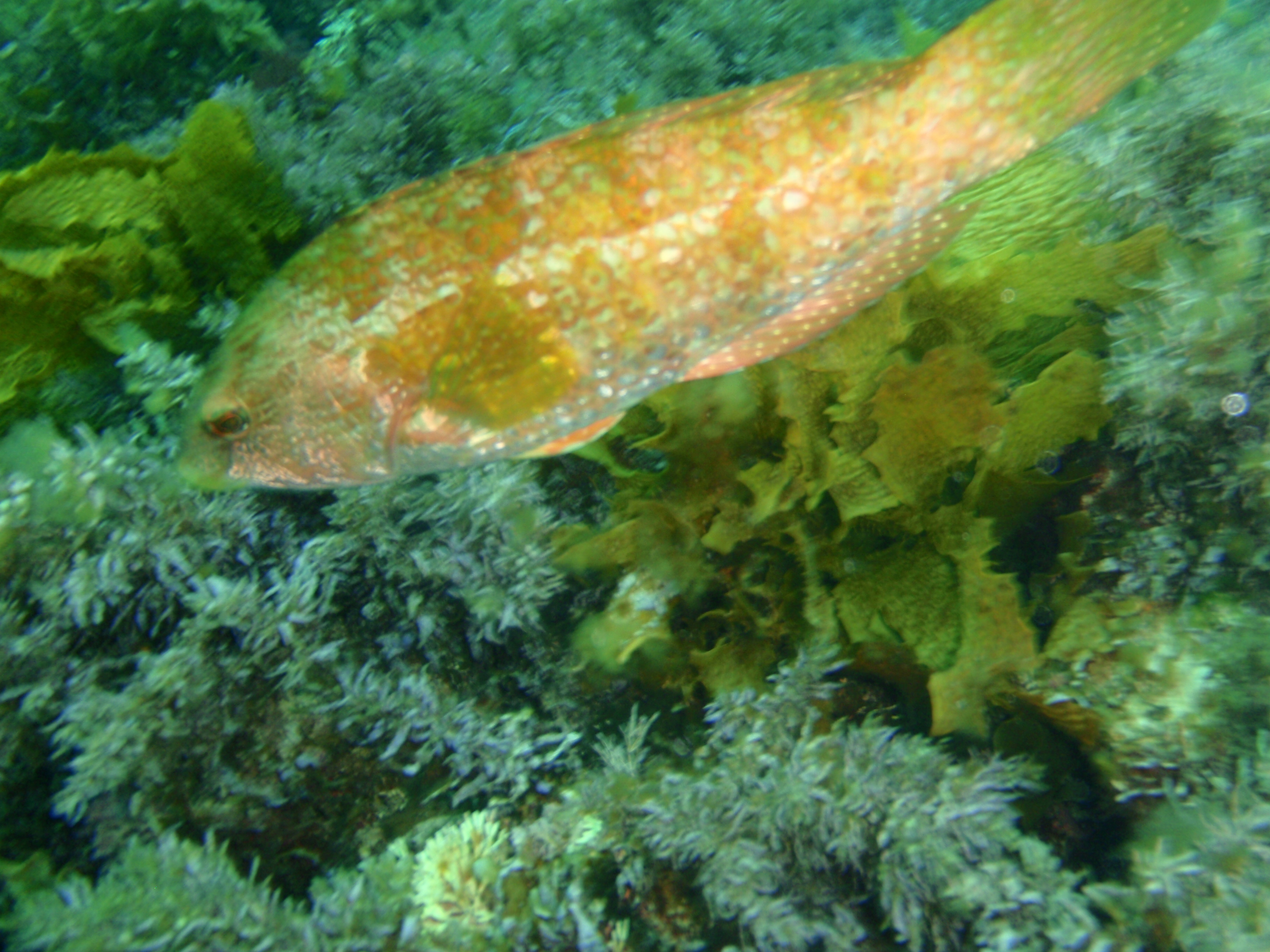
- male

Conservation status
- Least Concern (IUCN 3.1)

Scientific classification
- Kingdom: Animalia
- Phylum: Chordata
- Class: Actinopterygii
- Order: Labriformes
- Family: Labridae
- Genus: Notolabrus
- Species: N. parilus

Binomial name
- Notolabrus parilus (John Richardson, 1850)

Synonyms
- Tautoga parila Richardson, 1850; Labrichthys parila (Richardson, 1850); Pseudolabrus parila (Richardson, 1850); Pseudolabrus parilus (Richardson, 1850); Labrichthys punctulata Günther, 1862; Pseudolabrus punctulatus (Günther, 1862); Labrichthys bostockii Castelnau, 1873; Pseudolabrus bostockii (Castelnau, 1873); Labrichthys edelensis Castelnau, 1873; Pseudolabrus edelensis (Castelnau, 1873); Labrichthys convexus Castelnau, 1875; Pseudolabrus convexus (Castelnau, 1875); Labrichthys rubra Castelnau, 1875; Pseudolabrus ruber (Castelnau, 1875); Labrichthys unicolor Castelnau, 1875; Pseudolabrus unicolor (Castelnau, 1875)

= Brownspotted wrasse =

Species of fish

The brownspotted wrasse (Notolabrus parilus), also known as the blue-spotted parrotfish, brown-spotted parrotfish and orangespotted wrasse, is a species of marine ray-finned fish from the family Labridae, the wrasses. It is found in the Indian Ocean off the western and southern coasts of Australia.

== Description ==
The brownspotted wrasse is a relatively large species of wrasse with specimens measuring up to 31.2 centimetres (12.3 in) in standard length. The males of this specie have a dark brown or greyish brown background colour, with an interrupted horizontal white band running the length of the body. They also have gold or brown markings on their scales. The females and juveniles are a lighter shade of brown than the males or may be greenish, with white blotches on scales, and grey and brown barring across body.

== Distribution ==
The brownspotted wrasse is distributed from Shark Bay, Western Australia around the southern coastline of Australia as far as southern Victoria. They are most numerous off Western Australia, especially off the south western coast of the state, they are less abundant in South Australia and Victoria is the edge of their range where they are very rare.

== Habitat and biology ==
The brownspotted wrasse is found in the vicinity of rocky reefs with seaweeds, it prefers sheltered, moderately exposed and slightly more exposed areas. It occurs at depths of 1–20 metres (3.3–65.6 ft) but has been recorded at greater depths. The juveniles are sometimes recorded in beds of sea grass. This species is a carnivore which feeds on a variety of benthic invertebrates found in areas with a sand substrate, among sea grass and seaweeds. They prey upon gastropods, amphipods, isopods, prawns, crabs and echinoids.

This species is a protogynous hermaphrodite, it switches sex from female to male at some stage in its life cycle. The change occurs when the fish attains a standard length of 175–200 millimetres (6.9–7.9 in). Spawning takes place the late austral winter to early spring. The eggs are laid among seagrass and reef habitats with the eggs and larvae being pelagic.

== Species description and etymology ==
Notolabrus parilus was first formally described in 1850 as Tautoga parila by Scottish naturalist John Richardson (1787-1865) with the type locality given as King George Sound in Western Australia. The specific name parila is the name given to this species by the aboriginal inhabitants of Port George Sound area.
