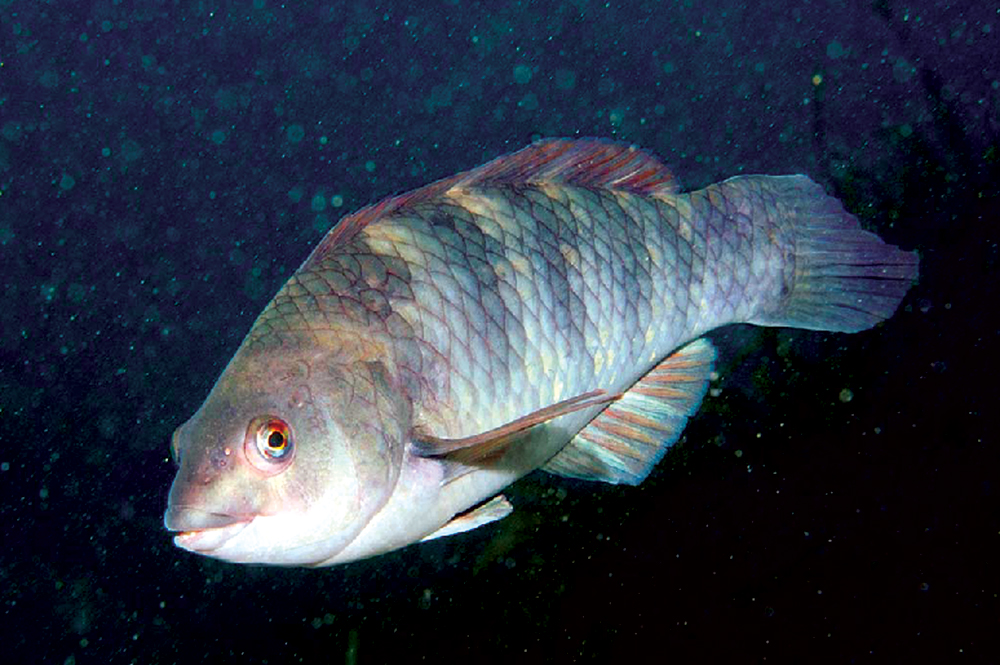

Conservation status
- Least Concern (IUCN 3.1)

Scientific classification
- Kingdom: Animalia
- Phylum: Chordata
- Class: Actinopterygii
- Division: Teleostei
- Order: Labriformes
- Family: Labridae
- Genus: Notolabrus
- Species: N. fucicola

Binomial name
- Notolabrus fucicola (J. Richardson, 1840)

Synonyms
- Labrus fucicola J. Richardson, 1840; Labrichthys fucicola (J. Richardson, 1840); Pseudolabrus fucicola (J. Richardson, 1840); Pseudolabrus pittensis Waite, 1910

= Notolabrus fucicola =

Species of fish

Notolabrus fucicola, the banded parrotfish, blue wrasse, kelpie, New Zealand banded wrasse, purple parrotfish, saddled wrasse, Southern purple wrasse, Southern wrasse, winter bream or yellow-saddled wrasse, is a species of wrasse native to the eastern Indian Ocean, off eastern Australia and all around New Zealand on rocky, weedy reef areas. Aging work in New Zealand suggested these wrasses can live at least 35 years.

== Taxonomy ==
Notolabrus fucicola was first formally described as Labrus fucicola in 1840 by the Scottish naturalist John Richardson (1787-1865) with the type locality being given as Port Arthur, Tasmania. When Barry C. Russell described the genus Notolabrus in 1988, he designated Labrus fucicola as its type species.

== Description ==
Notolabrus fucicola is the largest wrasse species occurring in New Zealand's waters. Its It grows to a length of 45 centimetres (18 in) in Australian waters but can be slightly larger around New Zealand, where they can reach lengths of 60 centimetres (24 in) and weights of up to 5 kilograms (11 lb). This species has quite a deep body and shows variable colouring, the young adult fish are reddish-brown mottled with green and orange and the adults are green-brown in colour with shades of purple and fuzzy yellowish vertical bars on their body and fins. Juveniles are a similar colour to young adults but have yellow markings.

== Distribution ==
Notolabrus fucicola is found in the south eastern Indian Ocean and the south western Pacific Ocean in Australia and New Zealand. It is found throughout New Zealand including the Three Kings Islands, Stewart Island and Snares Island. In Australia it is found off the south east from southern New South Wales, Victoria to eastern South Australia, as well as Tasmania.

== Habitat and biology ==
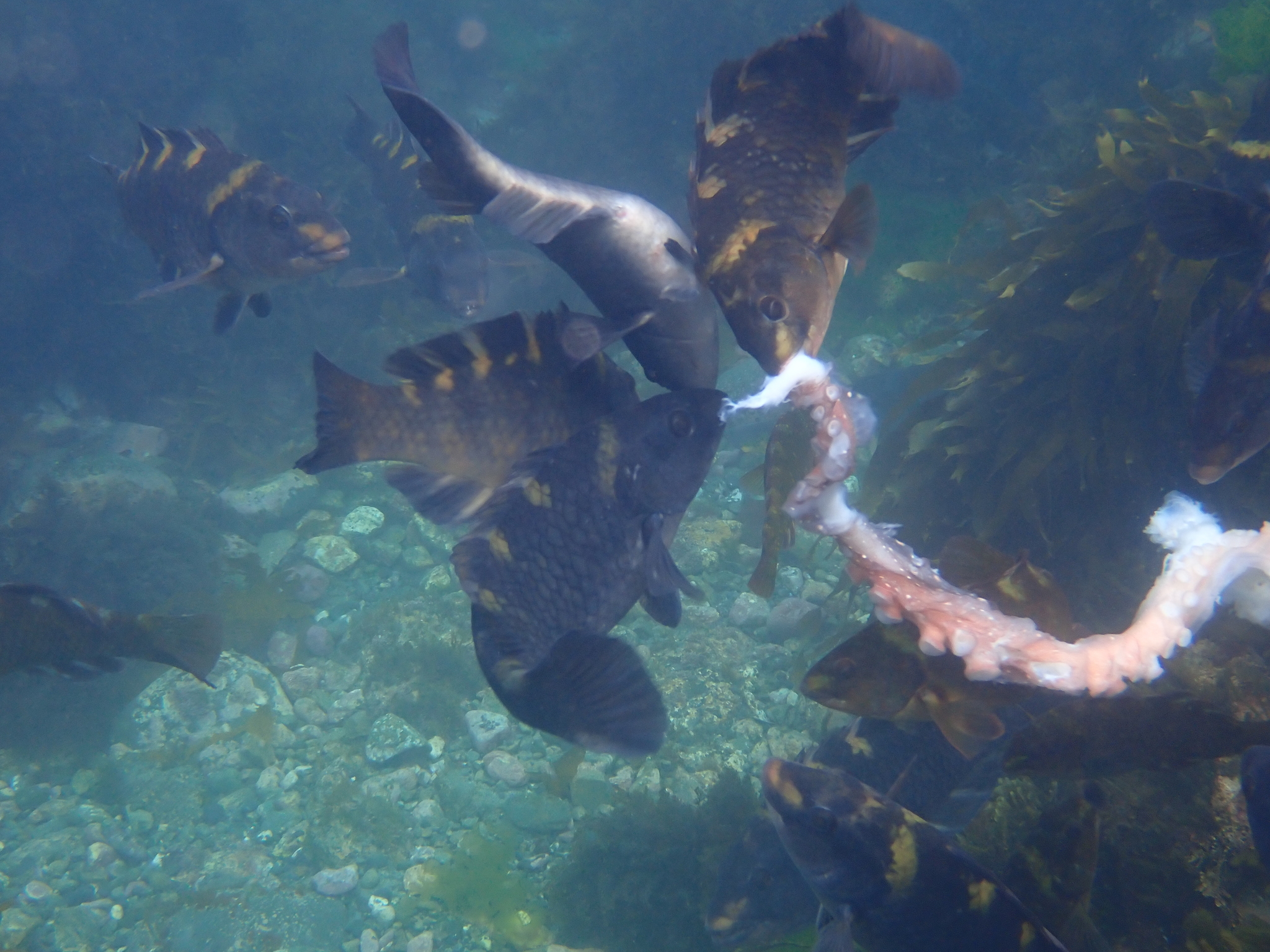
Feeding on an octopus

They are selective foragers which eat crustaceans such as chitons, limpets, barnacles, mollusks, crabs, and sea urchins. As they grow their diet undergoes change with the smaller fish, of lengths between 10 and 18 centimetres (3.9 and 7.1 in) feeding mostly on amphipods and isopods, while the larger fish prey mainly on bivalves, crabs, and gastropods. It occurs in beds of kelp and over rocky reefs which have some exposure to tides and currents at depths of 1–90 metres (3.3–295.3 ft). These are territorial fish which are long-live, often over 20 years old, and they defend their territories aggressively.

Notolabrus fucicola spawn in the southern Spring and Summer from July through to December, they do not spawn synchronously. Many other wrasses are protogynous hermaphrodites but this species is a secondary gonochorist, in which individual fish change sex before they reach sexual maturity. It has two colour forms, but it is not sexually dimorphic. In any population there will be just one morphological type of male. Workers have, so far, been unable to find any individuals with gonads in transition from female to male but particular environmental or social conditions may still be involved in inducing sex change in at least some of the fishes in a population. Unlike other wrasses which are protogynous hermaphrodites populations of Notolabrus fucicola can have large individuals of both sexes.

== Human usage ==
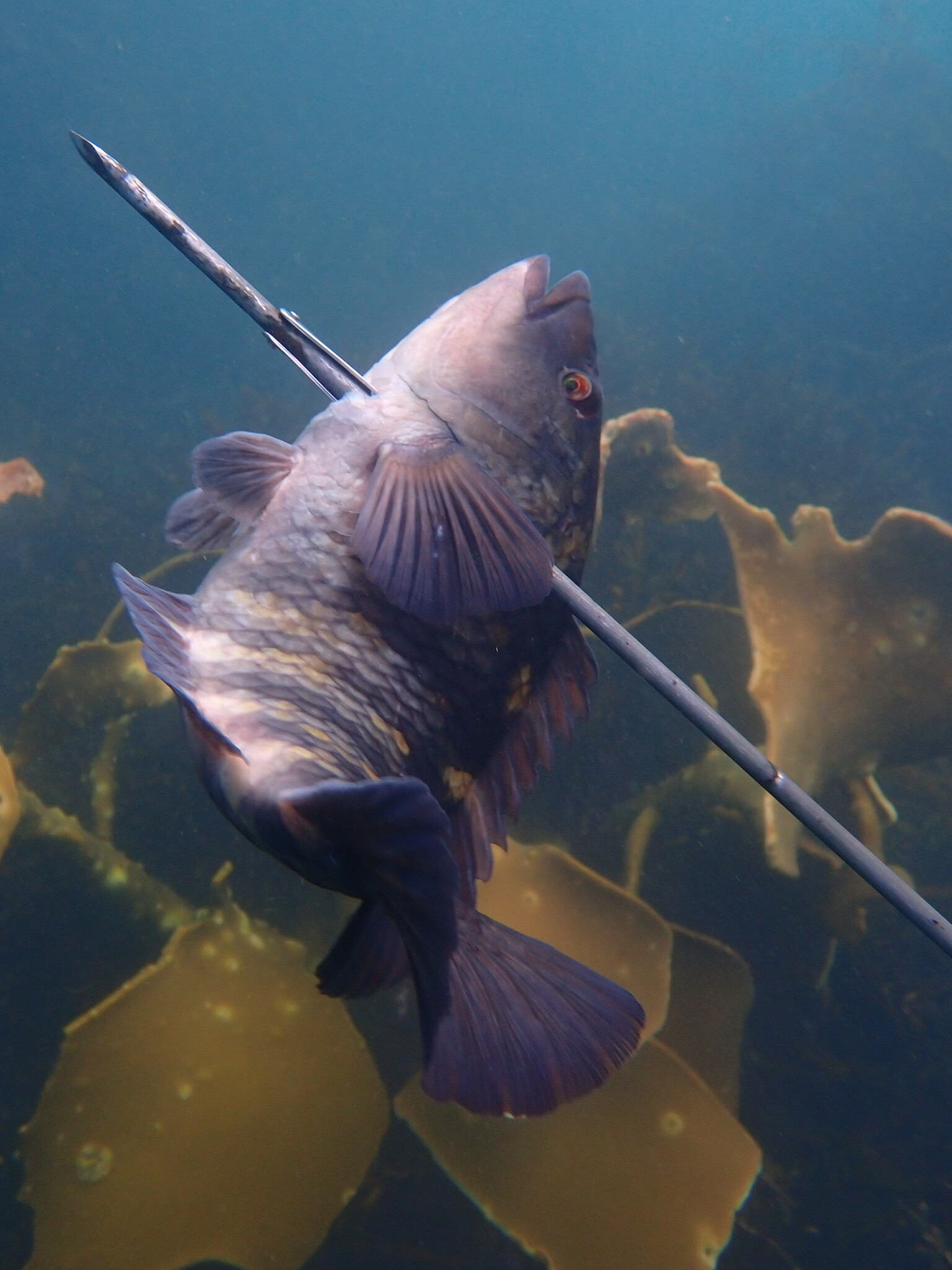
Spearfishing catch, in New Zealand

Notolabrus fucicola is a quarry species for both commercial fisheries and recreational anglers. They have been known to bite divers, leaving a scraping wound. Off the coasts of Victoria and Tasmania this species is caught by commercial fishermen using traps and on hand-lines to be sold as live fish. In Tasmanian waters and off eastern South Australia is a common bycatch in the lobster fishery, when caught it is frequently kept for use as bait. It is a quarry species for anglers and spear fishers too.

== Conservation ==
Notolabrus fucicola are easy to catch, because of their territorial nature and the aggressive competition with other fishes for food, and are caught from rocks, boats, and piers, There have been areas where they have undergone local population declines which have overfishing as their most likely cause but sedimentation and nutrient pollution may also affect the condition of their inshore reef habitat. In Victoria there is a legal minimum length and the commercial fishery licenses are capped at 51. In Tasmania The minimum legal size is 30 centimetres (12 in) and the authorities have issued 58 fishing licences. Notolabrus fucicola occur in several marine protected areas within its distribution. Although the IUCN classify this fish as Least Concern they recommend that further research is required on the population of this species, especially on the effects fisheries have, and the population trends should be studied at the same time.

== Gallery ==
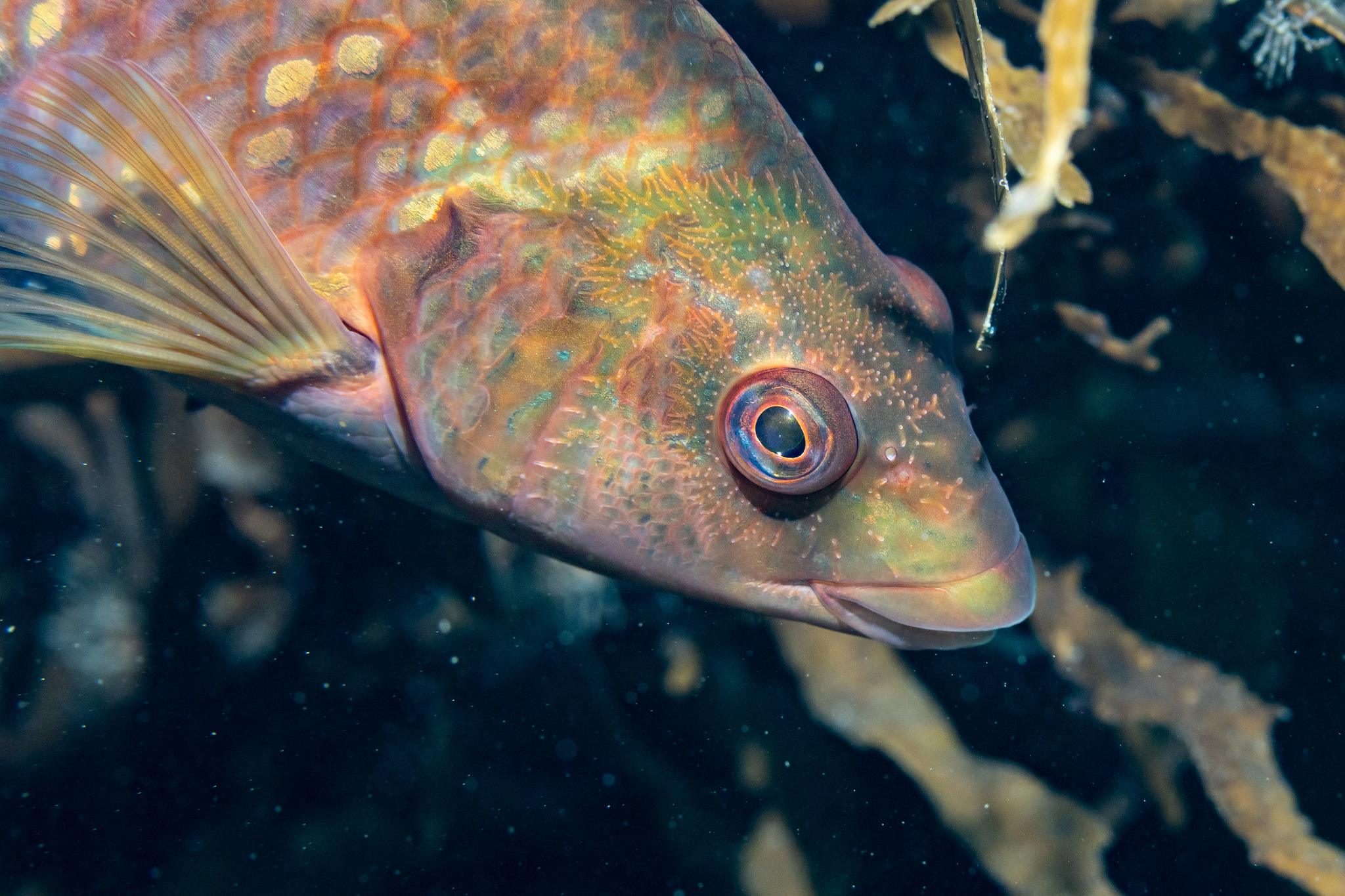

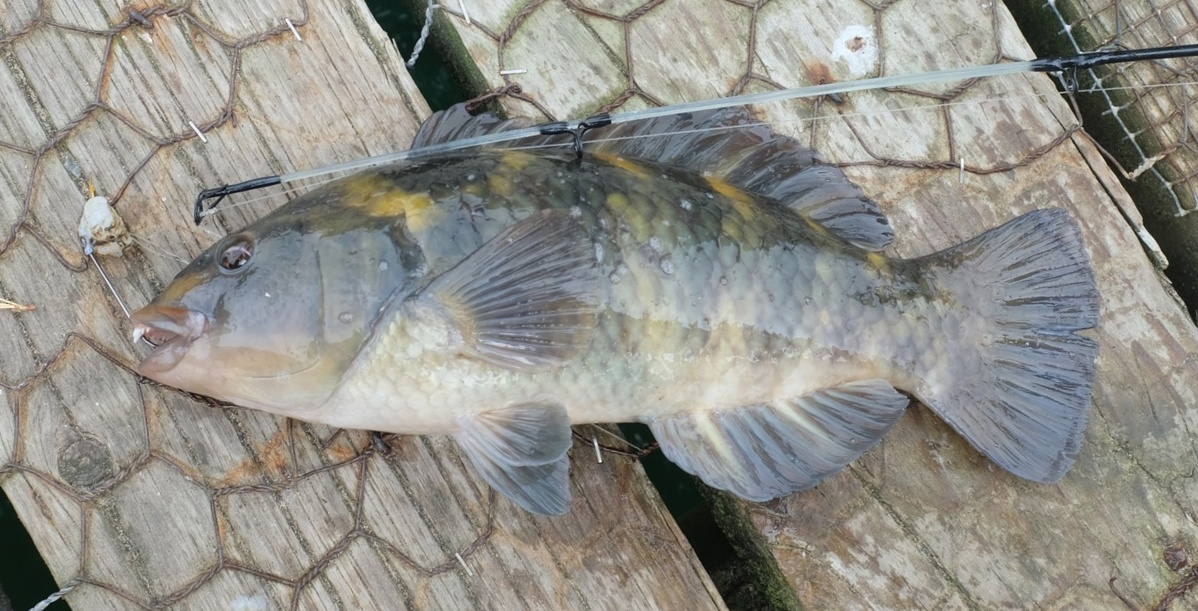

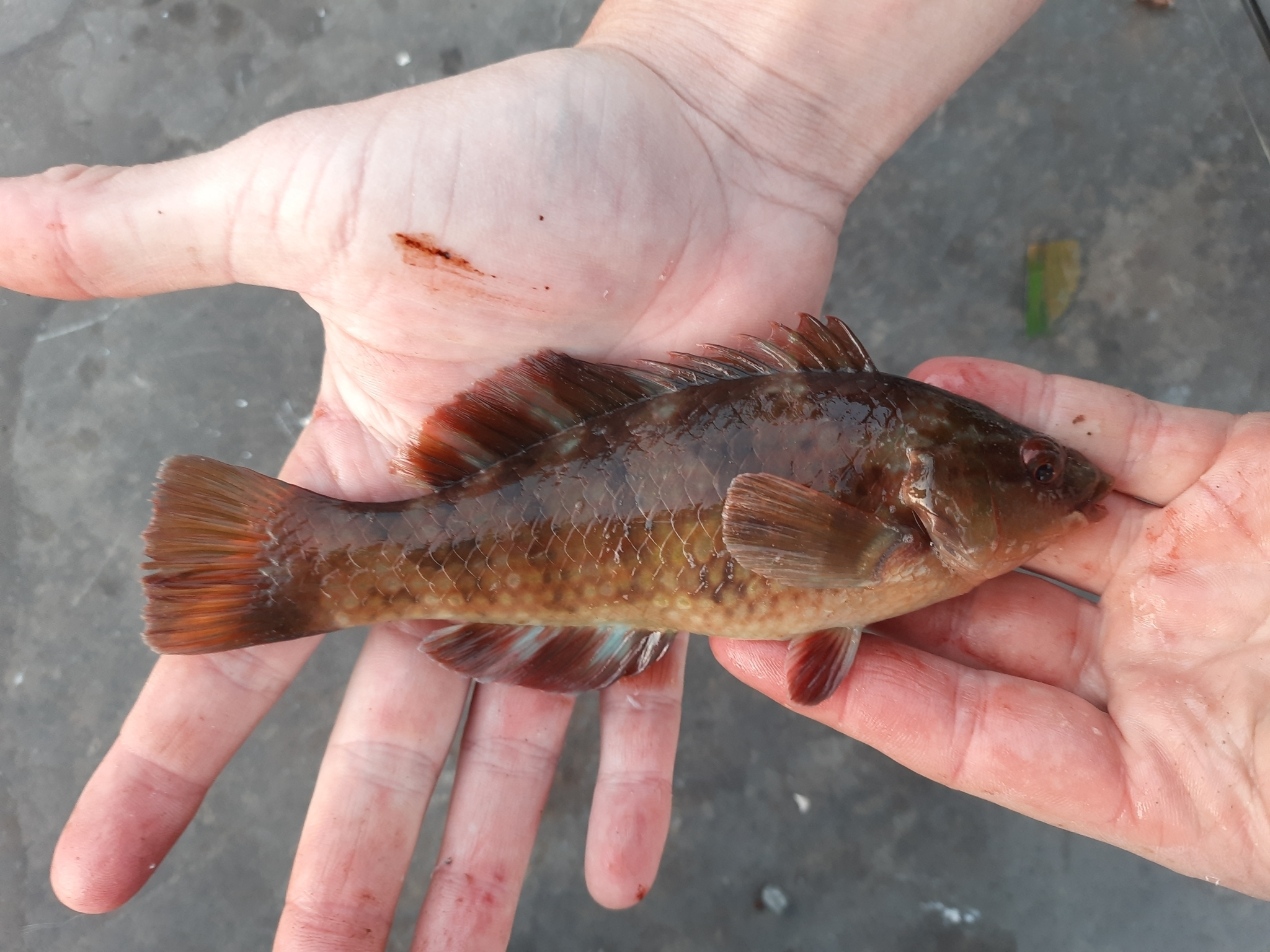

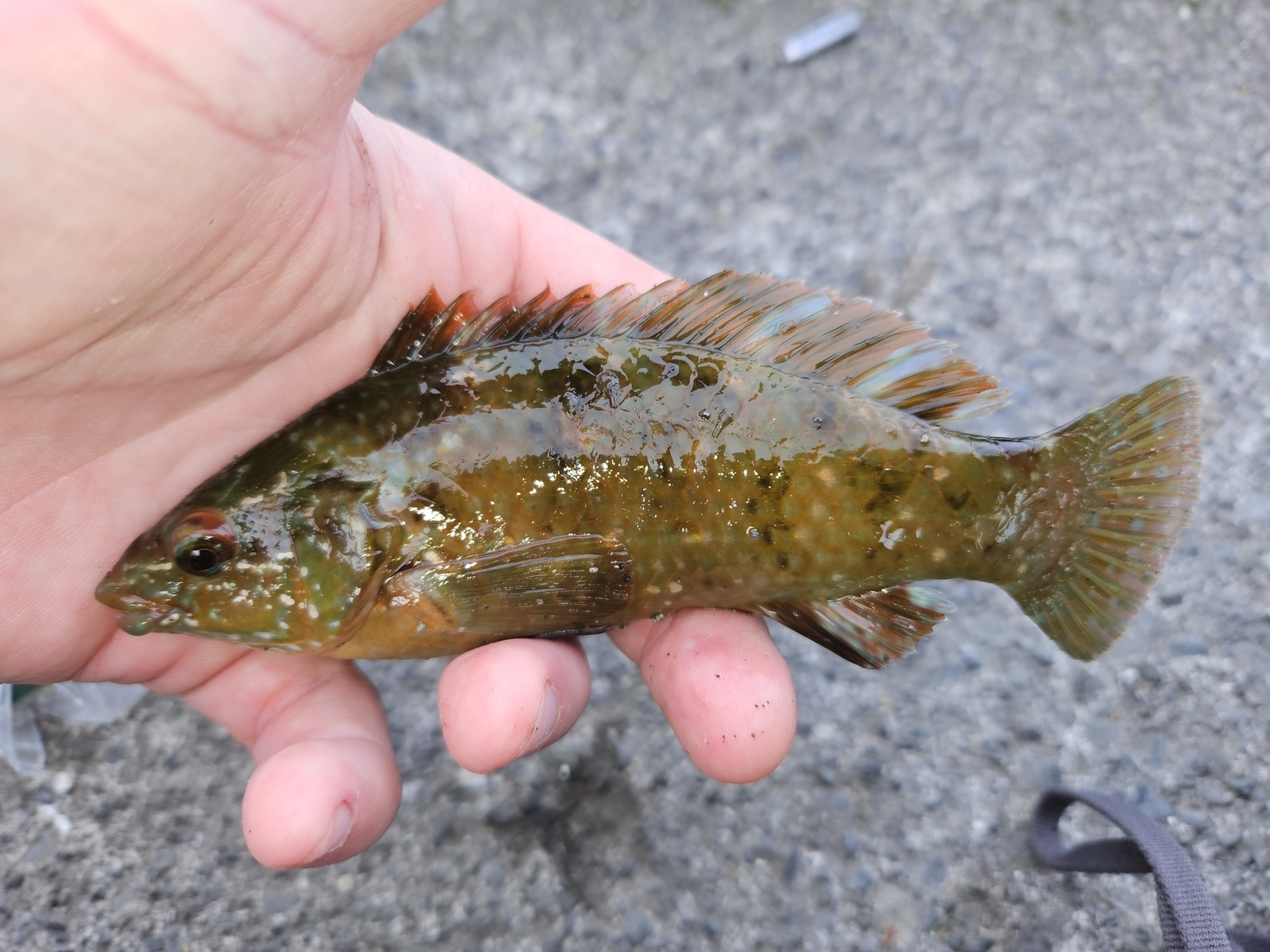

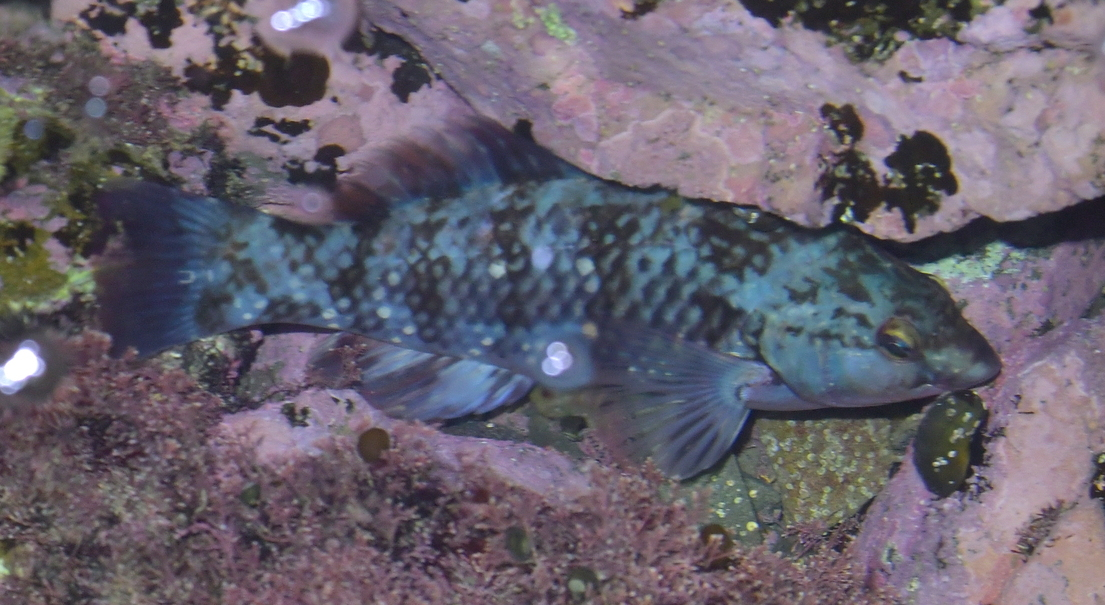

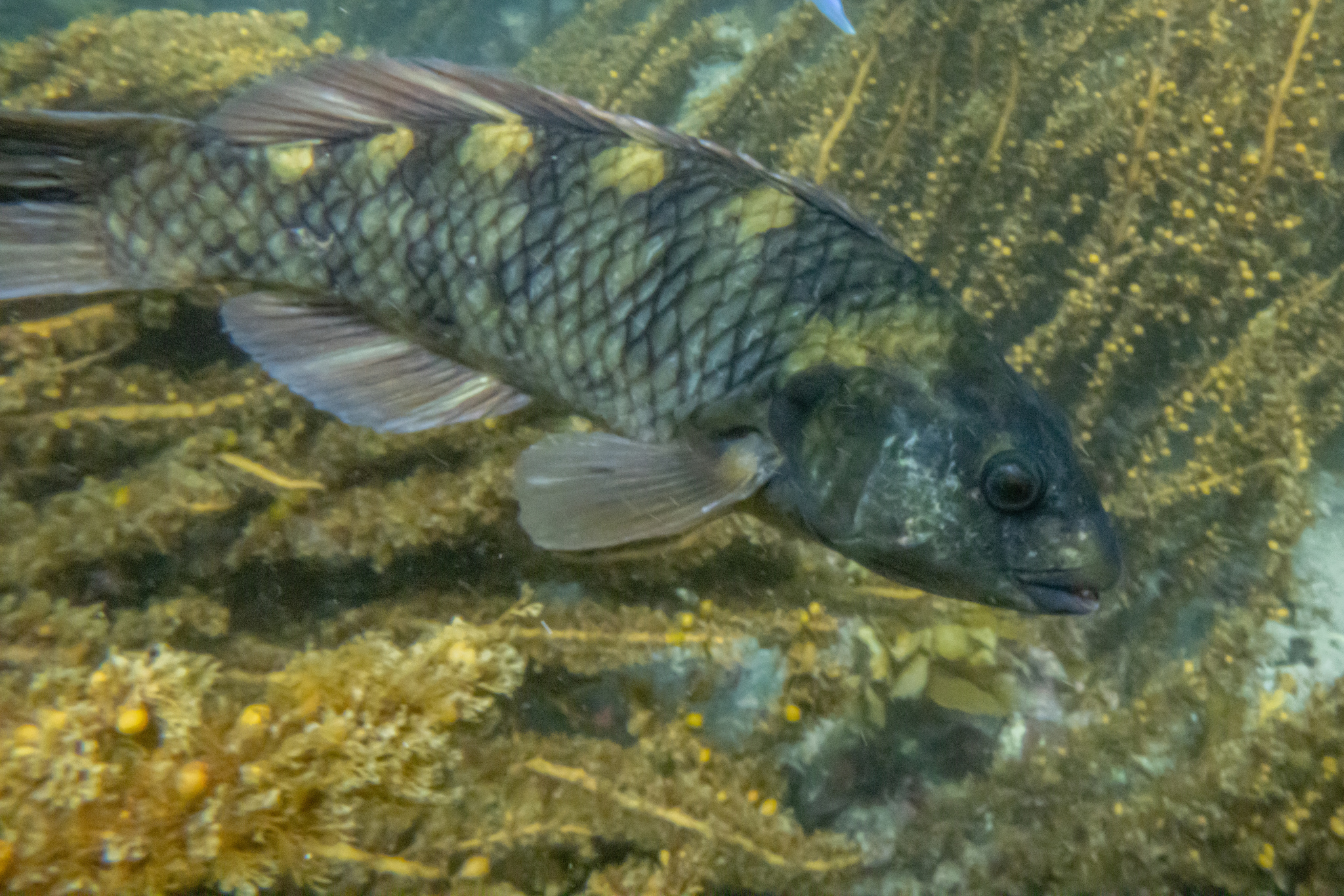

Feeding on an octopus
