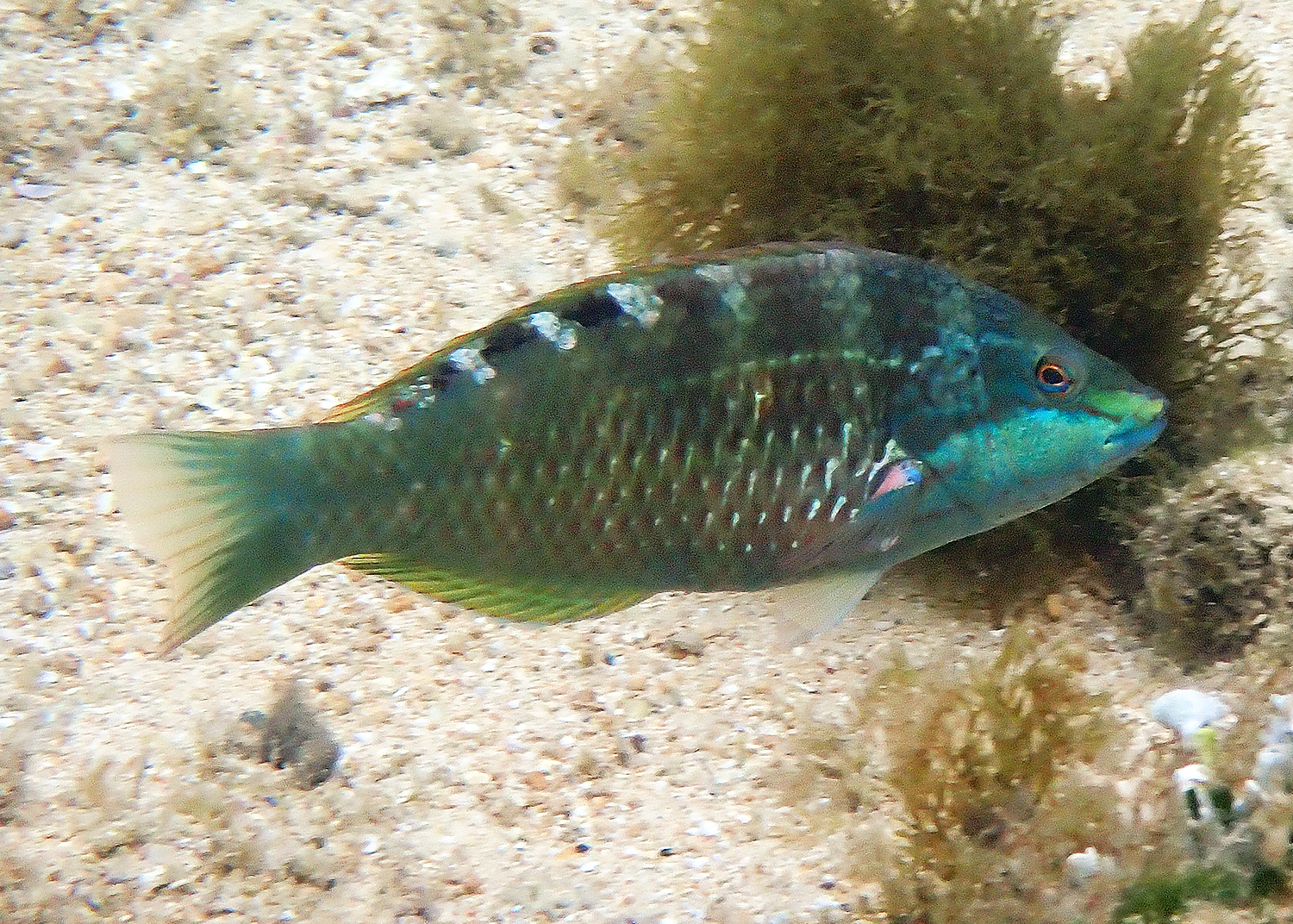
- Pseudolabrus luculentus

Scientific classification
- Kingdom: Animalia
- Phylum: Chordata
- Class: Actinopterygii
- Division: Teleostei
- Order: Labriformes
- Family: Labridae
- Subfamily: Pseudolabrinae; Bleeker, 1862

Genus
- Austrolabrus; Doratonotus; Dotalabrus; Eupetrichthys; Malapterus; Notolabrus; Pictilabrus; Pseudolabrus; Suezichthys

= Pseudolabrinae =

Tribe of freshwater fish

The pseudolabrine wrasses or parrotwrasses (not to be confused with parrotfish) are saltwater fish of the subfamily Pseudolabrinae, a subgroup of the wrasse family. They are distributed throughout the temperate Pacific and Indian Oceans, being absent from tropical (low latitude) waters, with the exception of Doratonotus, which inhabits the tropical Atlantic.

== Taxonomy ==
The pseudolabrine wrasses were originally conceived as a subgroup of the julidine wrasses in 1988. In 2005, Westneat and Alfaro recognized that the group was monophyletic and likely the sister group of Julidini, and thus tentatively proposed the creation of the tribe Pseudolabrini. This classification was additionally supported by Hughes et al in 2023. It was reclassified as a subfamily by Brownstein et al (2025), and the Catalog of Fishes has followed this treatment.

== Genera ==
As per Eschmeyer's Catalog of Fishes:

Genus	Image
Austrolabrus	A. maculatus
Doratonotus	D. megalepis
Dotalabrus	D. aurantiacus
Eupetrichthys	E. angustipes
Malapterus	M. reticulatus
Notolabrus	N. gymnogenis
Pictilabrus	P. laticlavius
Pseudolabrus	P. biserialis
Suezichthys	S. arquatus
