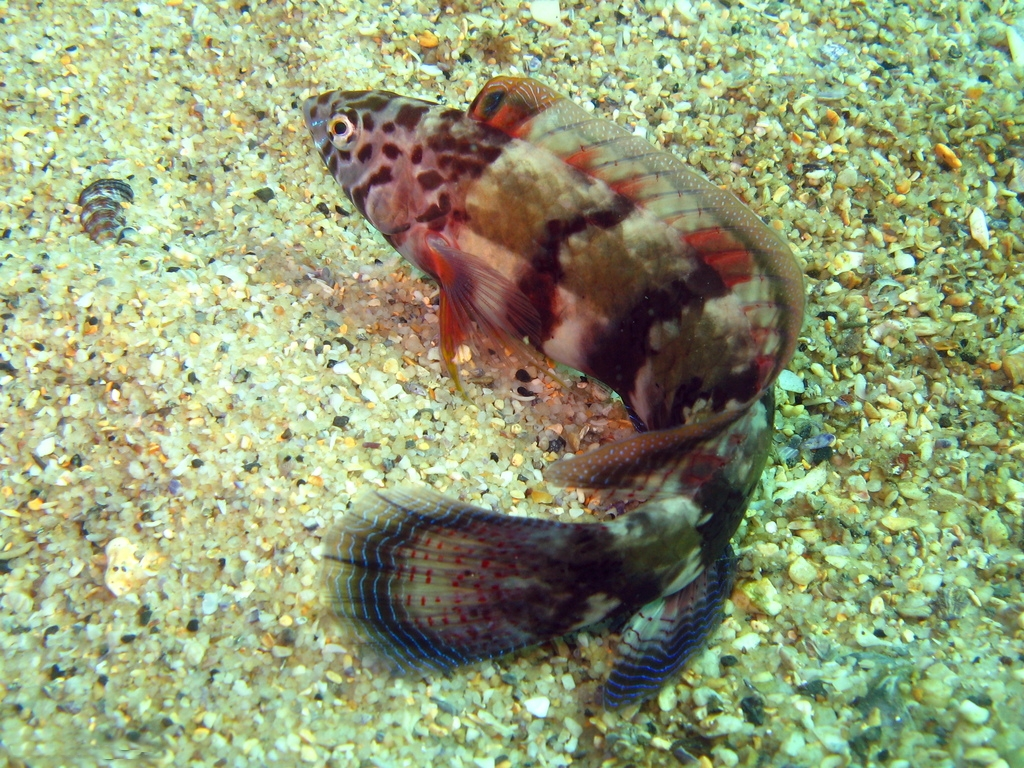

Conservation status
- Least Concern (IUCN 3.1)

Scientific classification
- Kingdom: Animalia
- Phylum: Chordata
- Class: Actinopterygii
- Order: Labriformes
- Family: Labridae
- Subfamily: Pseudolabrinae
- Genus: Eupetrichthys; E. P. Ramsay & J. D. Ogilby, 1888
- Species: E. angustipes

Binomial name
- Eupetrichthys angustipes E. P. Ramsay & J. D. Ogilby, 1888

= Snakeskin wrasse =

Species of fish

The snakeskin wrasse (Eupetrichthys angustipes), also known as the slender parrotfish or slender wrasse, is a species of wrasse native to the coastal waters of southern Australia. It inhabits rocky reefs down to about 17 m (56 ft). This species grows to a standard length of 12.4 cm (4.9 in). This species is the only known member of its genus.

The snakeskin wrasse can be recognised by its shape and colour. It is often observed swimming slightly above the seabed, with its head pointing obliquely upwards.

The snakeskin wrasse is a small slim wrasse with variable colouration and patterning; its body can be greyish, maroon, brownish or dark green above, which is sharply demarcated from the pale underside. There are five wide oblique bands along the flanks and irregular dark spots on the head. These fish swim in short bursts near the sea bed, at an angle with the head held up and making a nodding motion. At rest, they often adopt a curled position, or lie on their sides, raising their heads away from the bottom.
