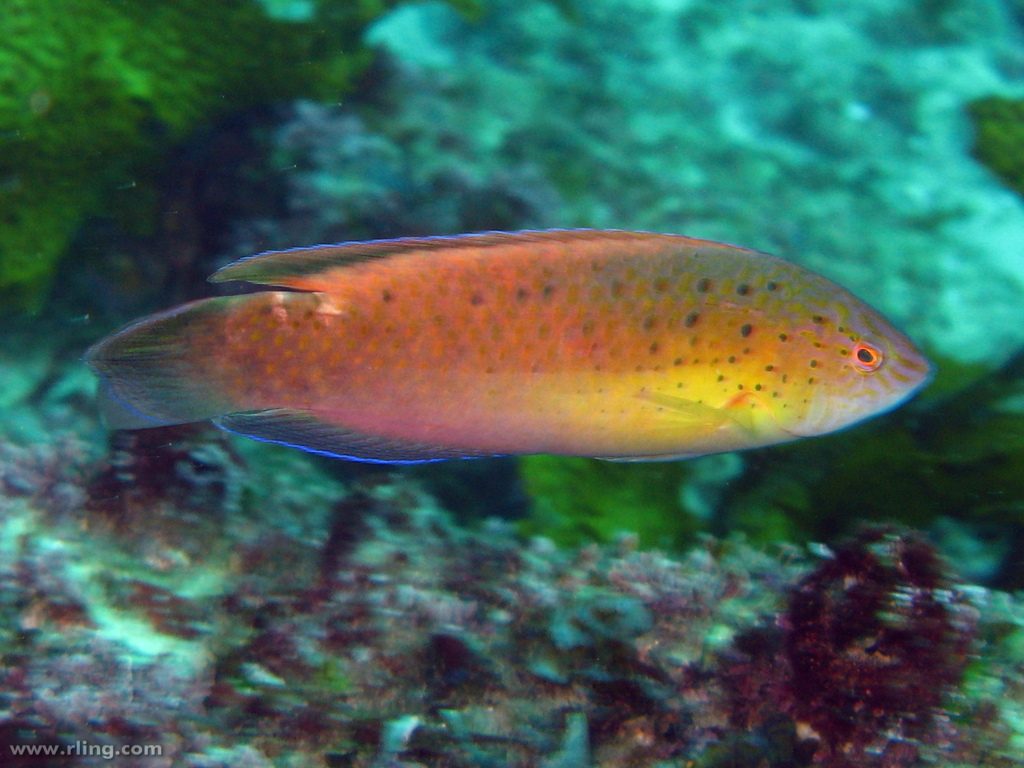

Conservation status
- Least Concern (IUCN 3.1)

Scientific classification
- Kingdom: Animalia
- Phylum: Chordata
- Class: Actinopterygii
- Order: Labriformes
- Family: Labridae
- Subfamily: Pseudolabrinae
- Genus: Austrolabrus; Steindachner, 1884
- Species: A. maculatus

Binomial name
- Austrolabrus maculatus (W. J. Macleay, 1881)

Synonyms
- Labrichthys maculata W. J. Macleay, 1881

= Black-spotted parrotfish =

Species of fish

The black-spotted parrotfish (Austrolabrus maculatus), also known as the black-spotted wrasse, is a species of wrasse native to the coast of southern Australia, where it is found in inshore waters at depths of from 10 to 40 metres (33 to 131 ft). This species grows to a length of 12.6 cm (5.0 in). This species is the only known member of its genus.
