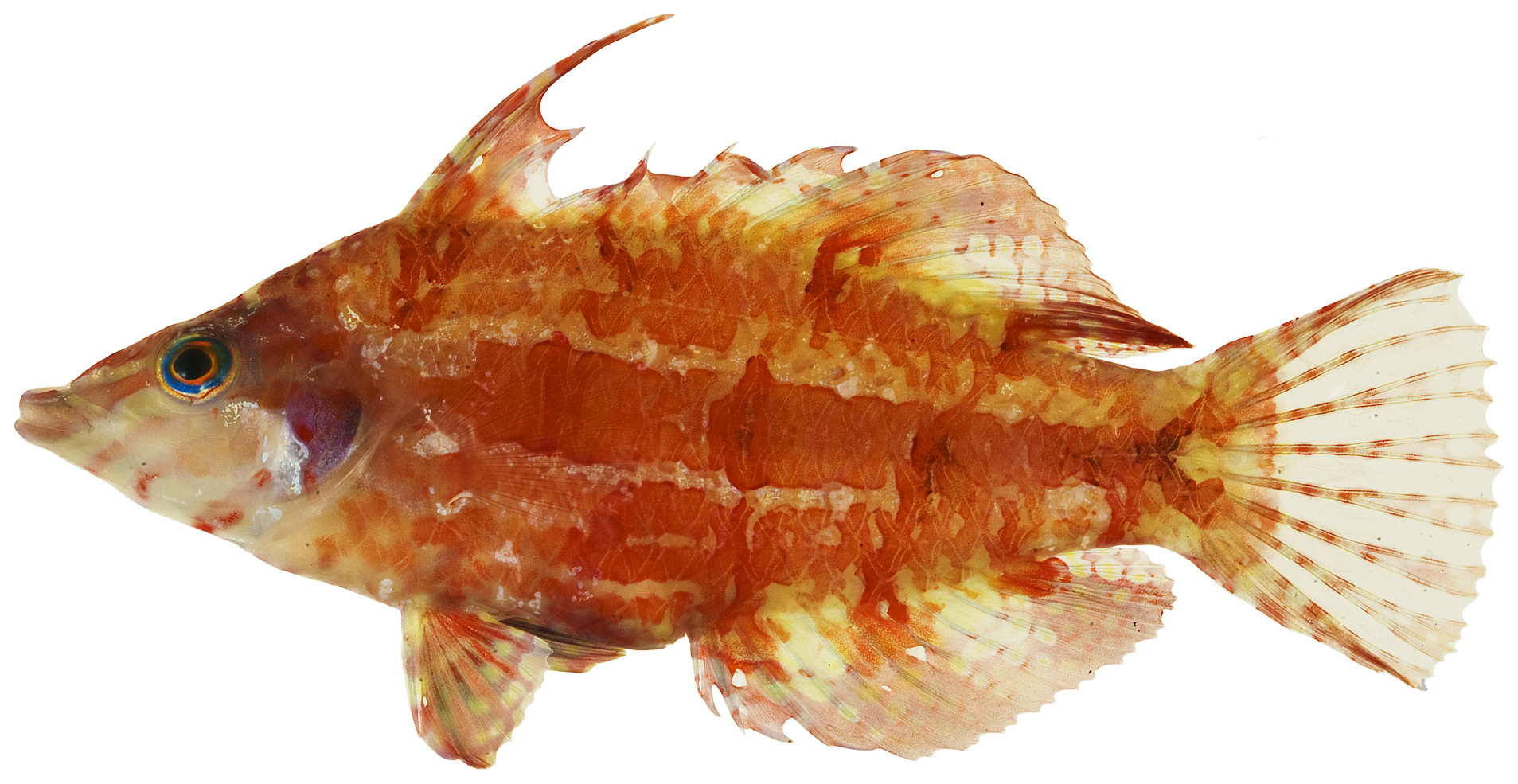

Conservation status
- Least Concern (IUCN 3.1)

Scientific classification
- Kingdom: Animalia
- Phylum: Chordata
- Class: Actinopterygii
- Division: Teleostei
- Order: Labriformes
- Family: Labridae
- Subfamily: Pseudolabrinae
- Genus: Doratonotus; Günther, 1861
- Species: D. megalepis

Binomial name
- Doratonotus megalepis Günther, 1862

Synonyms
- Genus: Antonichthys Bauchot & Blanc, 1961; Species: Doratonotus thalassinus D. S. Jordan & C. H. Gilbert, 1884; Doratonotus decoris Evermann & M. C. Marsh, 1899; Antonichthys wetmorelloides Bauchot & Blanc, 1961

= Dwarf wrasse =

Species of fish

The dwarf wrasse, Doratonotus megalepis, is a species of wrasse native to tropical waters of the western Atlantic Ocean from Florida, United States, to Brazil and in the eastern Atlantic from around Ile Las Rolas, São Tomé, and the Cape Verde Islands. It is found in beds of turtle grass at depths of 1 to 15 m (3.3 to 49.2 ft), where its green coloration allows it to blend in with its surroundings. This species grows to a total length of 9.4 cm (3.7 in). It can be found in the aquarium trade. This species is the only known member of its genus.
