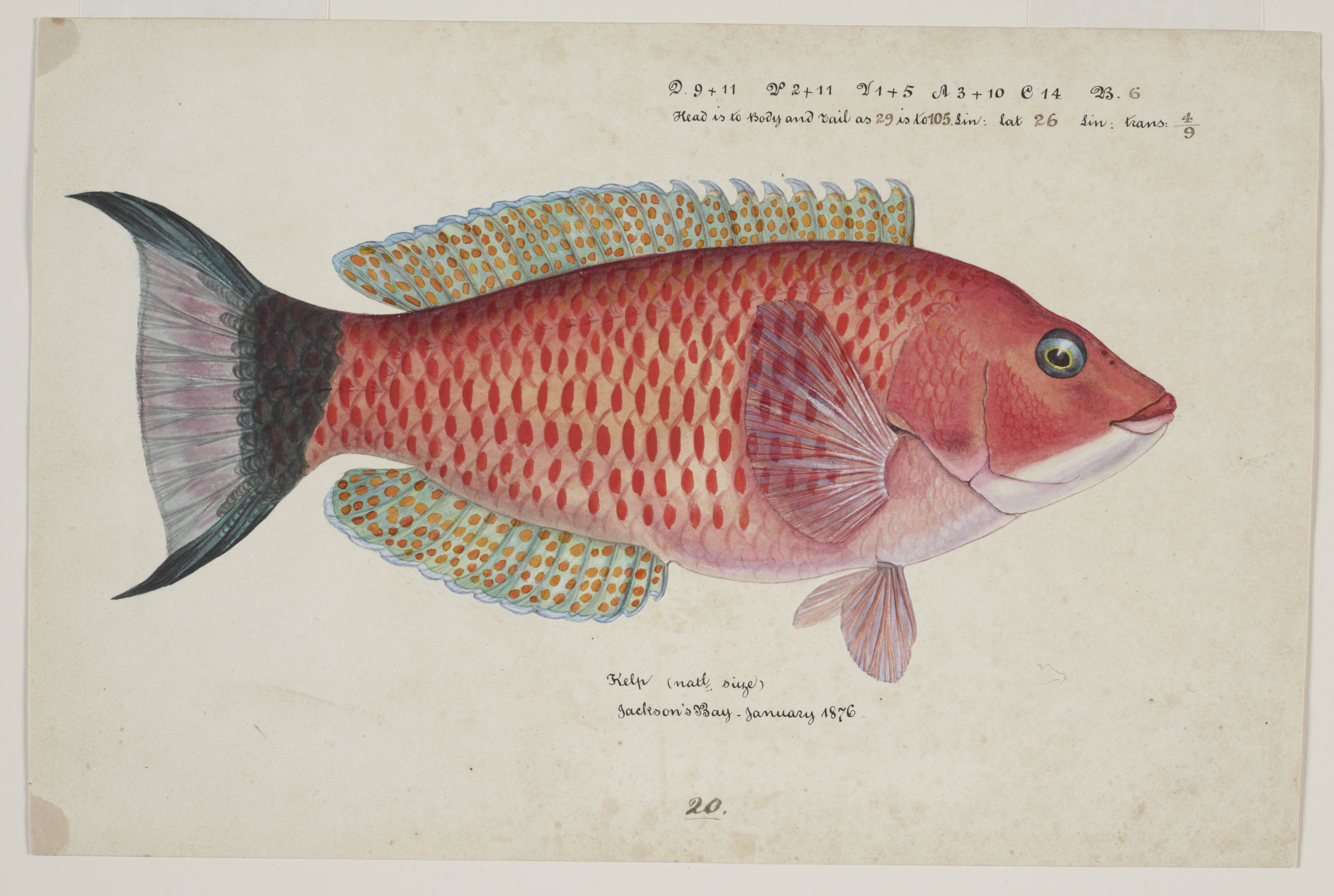

Conservation status
- Least Concern (IUCN 3.1)

Scientific classification
- Kingdom: Animalia
- Phylum: Chordata
- Class: Actinopterygii
- Order: Labriformes
- Family: Labridae
- Genus: Pseudolabrus
- Species: P. miles

Binomial name
- Pseudolabrus miles (J. G. Schneider & J. R. Forster, 1801)

Synonyms
- Labrus miles J. G. Schneider & J. R. Forster, 1801; Julis miles (J. G. Schneider & J. R. Forster, 1801); Labrichthys miles (J. G. Schneider & J. R. Forster, 1801); Labrus coccineus J. R. Forster, 1801 (ambiguous); Labrichthys roseipunctata F. W. Hutton, 1880; Pseudolabrus roseipunctatus (F. W. Hutton, 1880); Pseudolabrus cossyphoides Steindachner, 1900

= Scarlet wrasse =

Species of fish

Pseudolabrus miles, the scarlet wrasse, is a species of wrasse endemic to the waters around New Zealand. It is an inhabitant of reefs where it can be found at depths of from 4 to 40 metres (13 to 131 ft), though usually deeper than 10 metres (33 ft). Males of this species can reach a length of 27.2 centimetres (10.7 in) SL while females are slightly smaller at 26.9 centimetres (10.6 in).

== Gallery ==
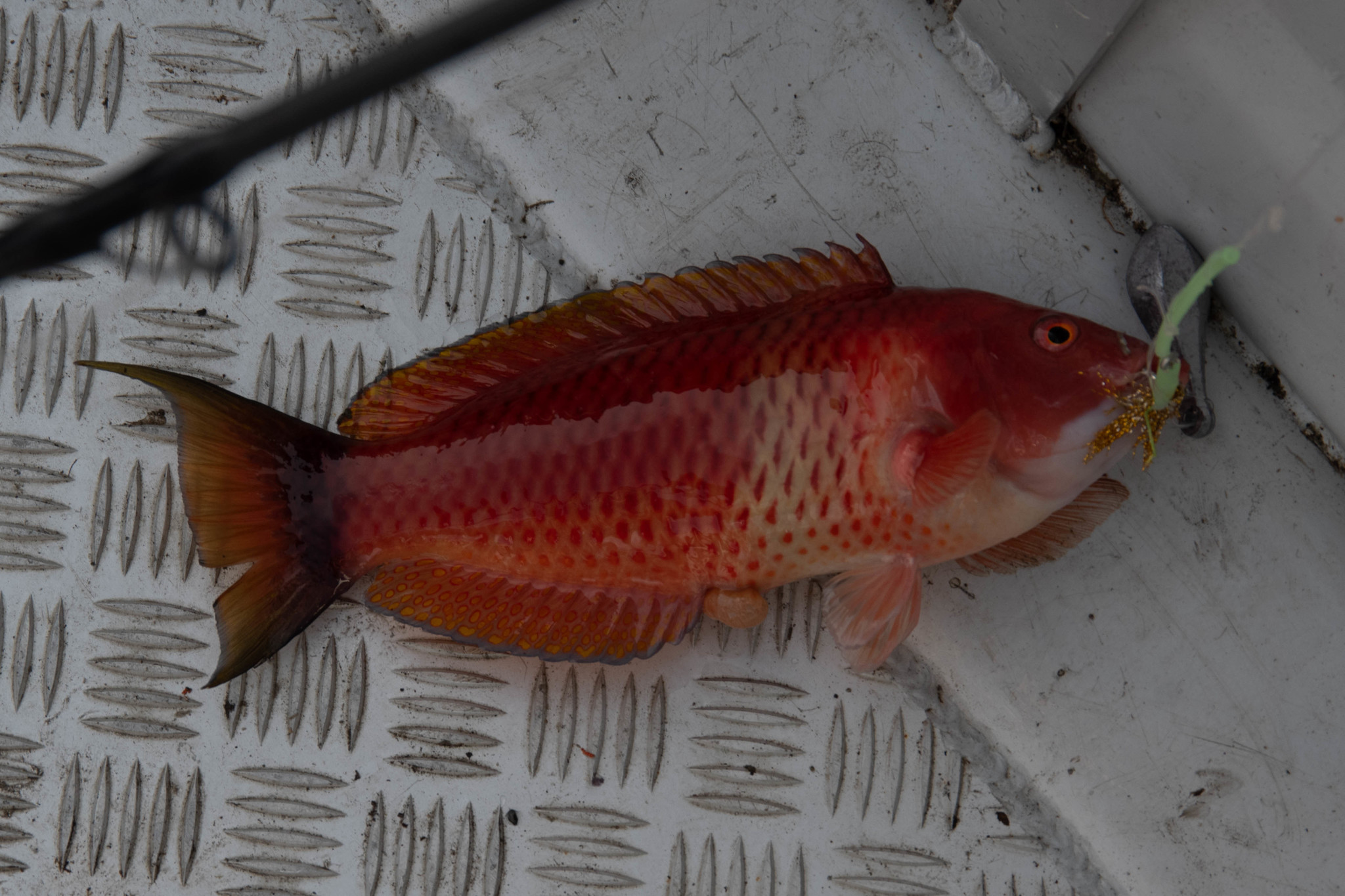

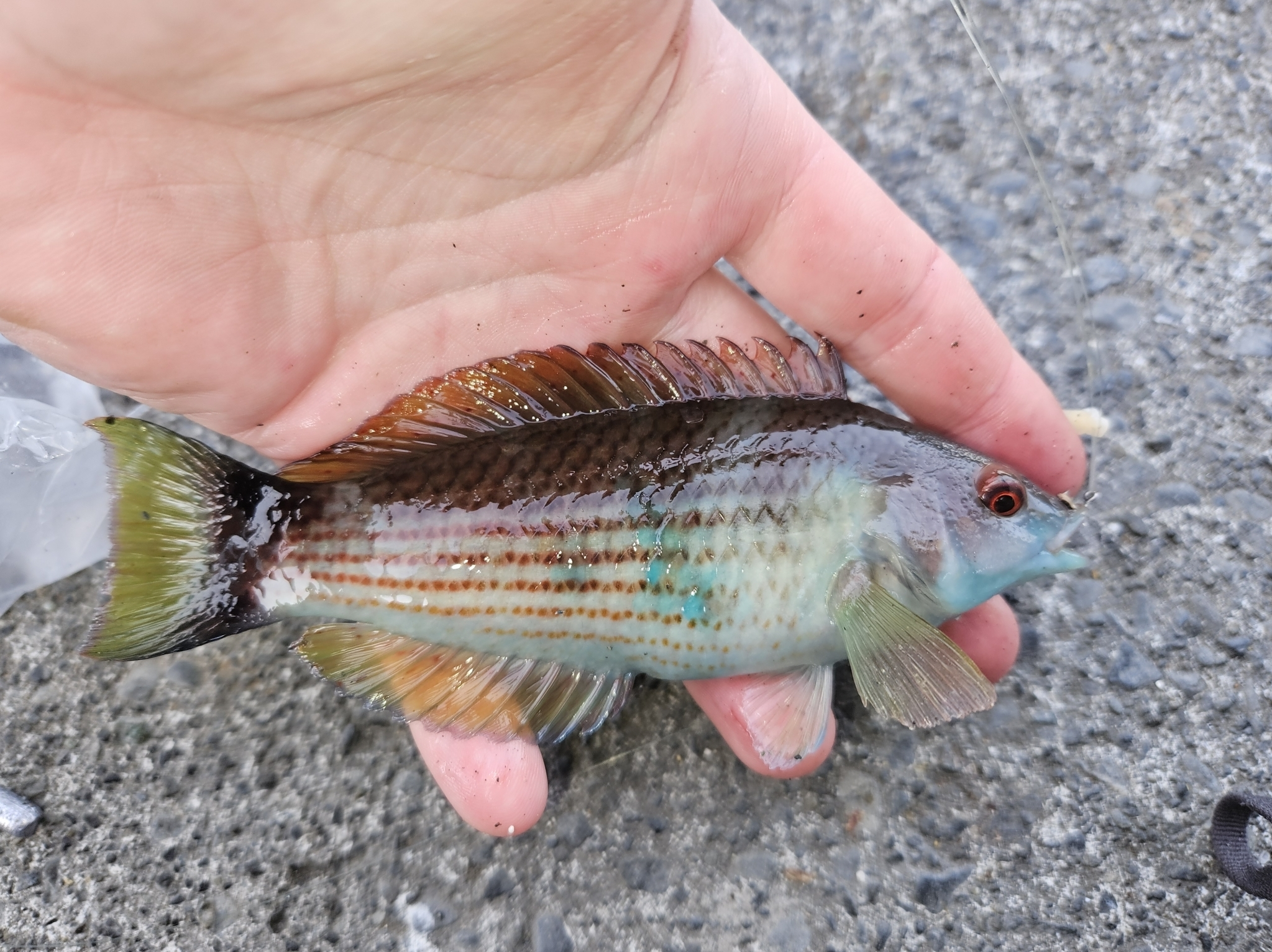

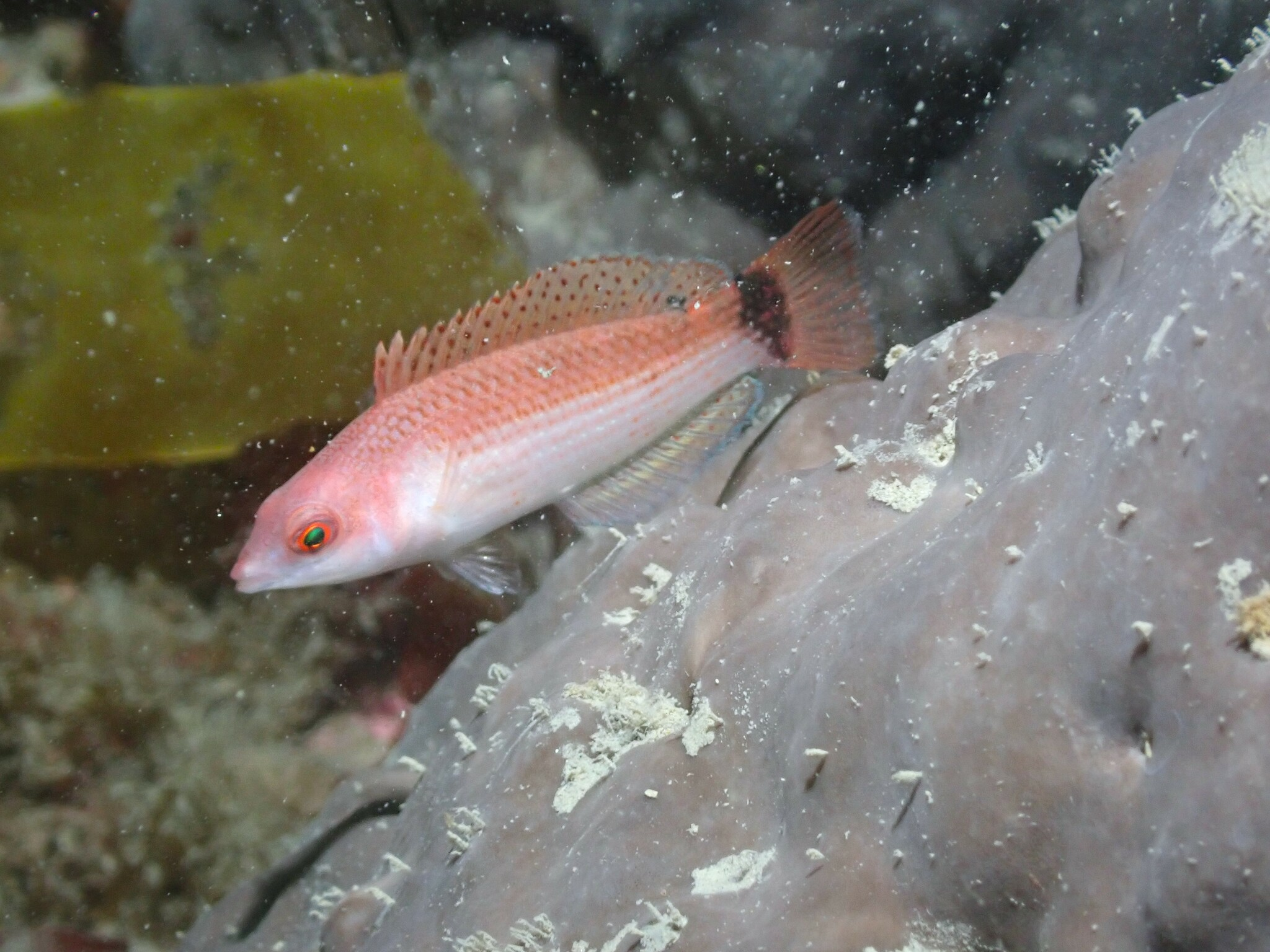

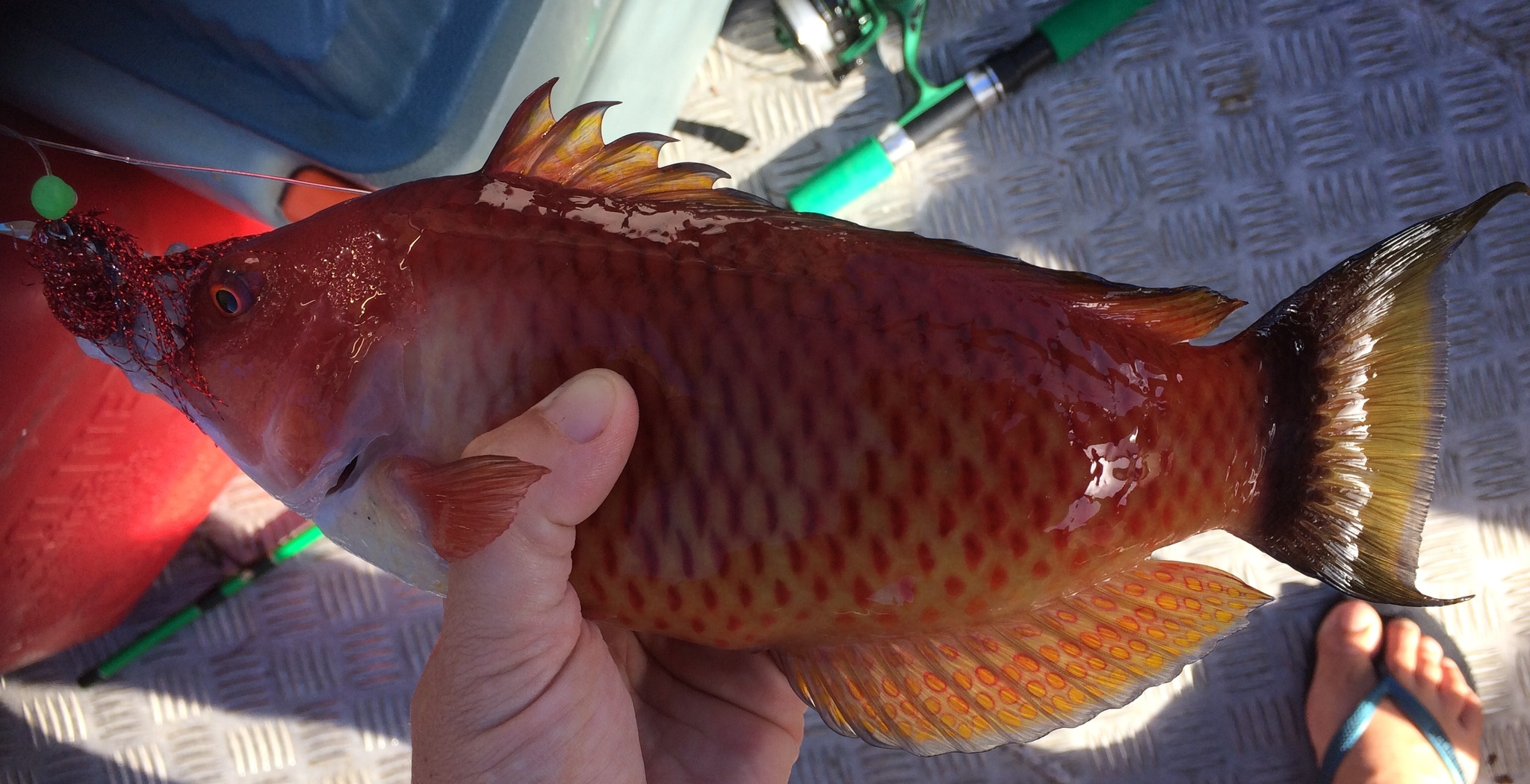
