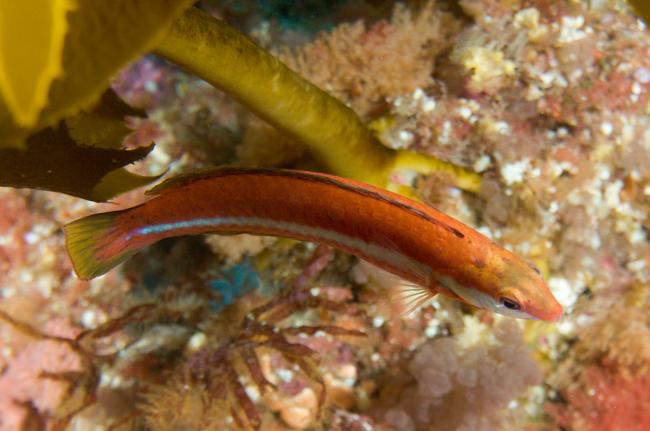
- male

Conservation status
- Least Concern (IUCN 3.1)

Scientific classification
- Kingdom: Animalia
- Phylum: Chordata
- Class: Actinopterygii
- Order: Labriformes
- Family: Labridae
- Genus: Suezichthys
- Species: S. aylingi

Binomial name
- Suezichthys aylingi B. C. Russell, 1985

= Crimson cleaner fish =

Species of fish

The crimson cleaner fish (Suezichthys aylingi), or butcher's dick in Australia, is a species of wrasse native to the southwestern Pacific Ocean around Australia and New Zealand. This species inhabits patches of sand on reefs at depths of from 6 to 100 metres (20 to 328 ft). It is a cleaner fish. Males of this species can reach a length of 11.7 centimetres (4.6 in) SL while females only reach 8.6 centimetres (3.4 in).
