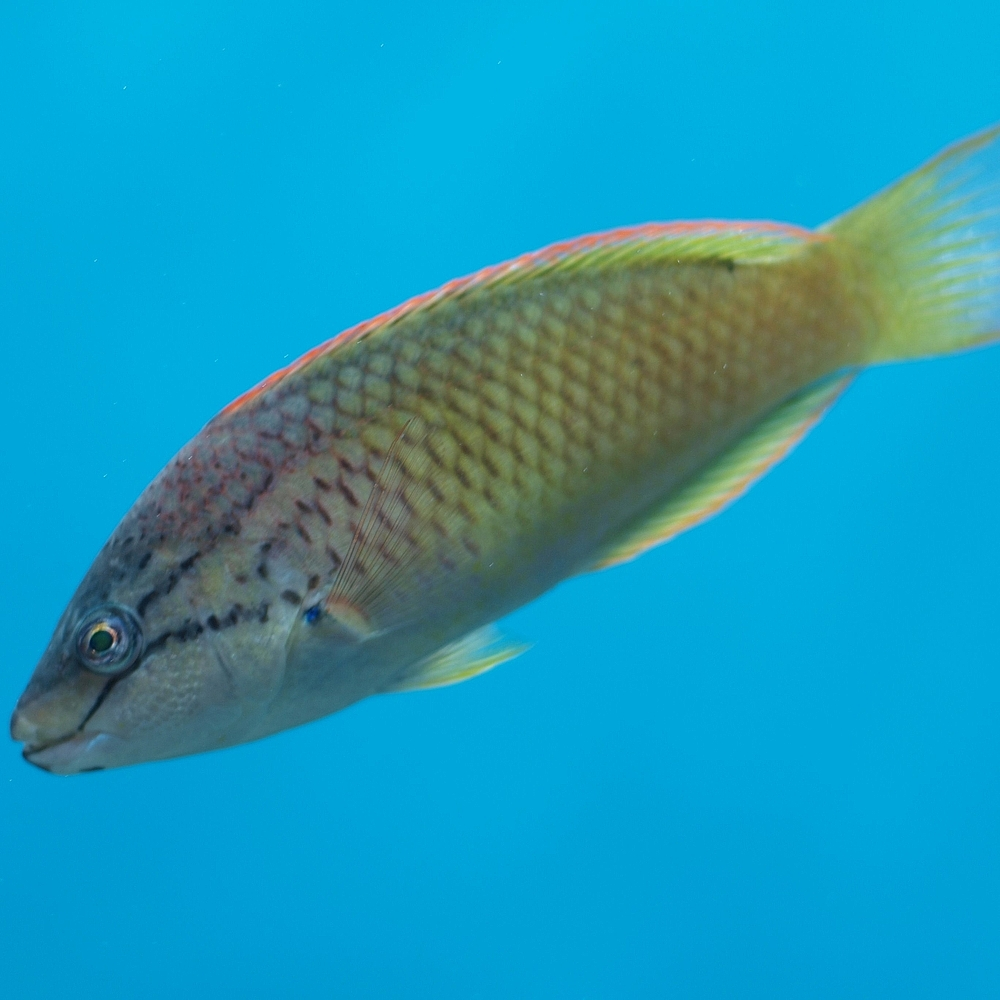

Conservation status
- Least Concern (IUCN 3.1)

Scientific classification
- Kingdom: Animalia
- Phylum: Chordata
- Class: Actinopterygii
- Order: Labriformes
- Family: Labridae
- Genus: Pseudolabrus
- Species: P. eoethinus

Binomial name
- Pseudolabrus eoethinus (Richardson, 1846)

Synonyms
- Labrus eoethinus Richardson, 1846; Labrus rubiginosus Temminck & Schlegel, 1845

= Pseudolabrus eoethinus =

Species of fish

Pseudolabrus eoethinus, the red naped wrasse, is a species of marine ray-finned fish from the wrasse family, Labridae. It is found in the northwestern Pacific off the coast of Japan, Taiwan and in the South China Sea. This small species of wrasse, with a standard length of up to 207 millimetres (8.1 in), which is common on rocky reefs, in waters no deeper than 30 metres (98 ft). This species lives in small harems made up of a single territorial male and a number of females. Spawning takes place from mid-November to mid-December with the fish pairing up and spawning within the male's territory. P. eoethinus associates with the Spottedtail morwong (Cheilodactylus (Goniistius) zonatus), feeding mainly on crustaceans and molluscs. This species was first formally described as Labrus eoethinus by the Scottish naturalist and naval surgeon John Richardson (1787-1865) in 1846 with the type locality given as Canton, China. Previously, Coenraad Jacob Temminck & Hermann Schlegel applied the name Labrus rubiginosus to specimens they examined but this name was invalid although Pieter Bleeker used this name for the Type species of his new genus, Pseudolabrus in 1862.
