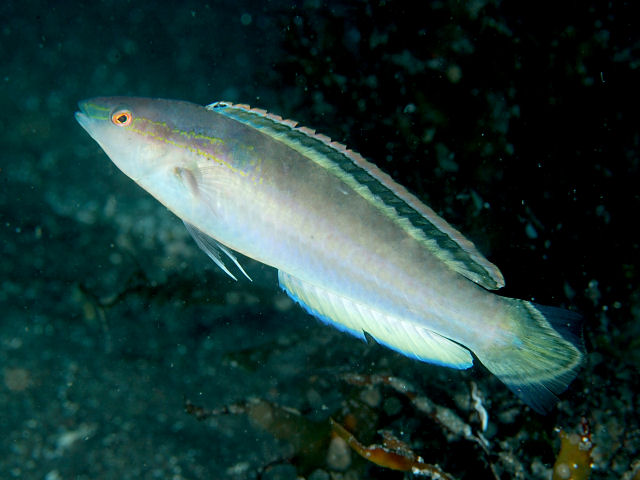
- Slender Wrasse (S. gracilis)

Scientific classification
- Kingdom: Animalia
- Phylum: Chordata
- Class: Actinopterygii
- Order: Labriformes
- Family: Labridae
- Subfamily: Pseudolabrinae
- Genus: Suezichthys; J. L. B. Smith, 1958

Type species
- Labrichthys caudavittatus Steindachner, 1898

Synonyms
- Suezia J. L. B. Smith, 1957 (preoccupied in Calanoida, Crustacea (Suezia R. Gurney, 1927 - jr. synonym of Ridgewayia I. Thompson & A. Scott, 1903)); Nelabrichthys B. C. Russell, 1983

= Suezichthys =

Genus of fishes

Suezichthys is a genus of wrasses native to the southeastern Atlantic Ocean through the Indian Ocean to the Pacific Ocean.

== Species ==
The currently recognized species in this genus are:

- Suezichthys arquatus B. C. Russell, 1985 (rainbow slender wrasse)
- Suezichthys aylingi B. C. Russell, 1985 (crimson cleaner fish)
- Suezichthys bifurcatus B. C. Russell, 1986 (striped trawl wrasse)
- Suezichthys caudavittatus (Steindachner, 1898) (spottail wrasse)
- Suezichthys cyanolaemus B. C. Russell, 1985 (bluethroat rainbow wrasse)
- Suezichthys devisi (Whitley, 1941) (gracilis wrasse)
- Suezichthys gracilis (Steindachner & Döderlein (de), 1887) (slender wrasse)
- Suezichthys notatus (Kamohara, 1958) (northern rainbow wrasse)
- Suezichthys ornatus (Carmichael, 1819)
- Suezichthys rosenblatti B. C. Russell & Westneat, 2013 (spotted rainbow wrasse)
- Suezichthys russelli J. E. Randall, 1981 (Russell's wrasse)
- Suezichthys soelae B. C. Russell, 1985 (Soela wrasse)
