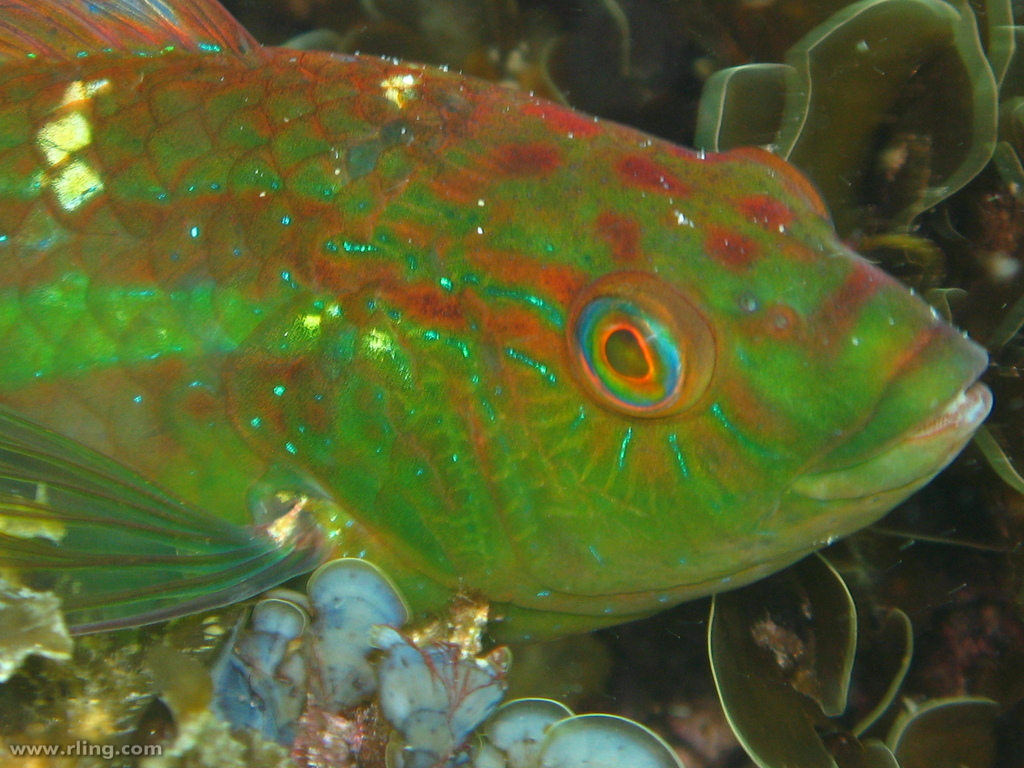
- Pictilabrus laticlavius

Scientific classification
- Kingdom: Animalia
- Phylum: Chordata
- Class: Actinopterygii
- Order: Labriformes
- Family: Labridae
- Subfamily: Pseudolabrinae
- Genus: Pictilabrus; T. N. Gill, 1891

Type species
- Labrus laticlavius J. Richardson, 1840

= Pictilabrus =

Genus of fishes

Pictilabrus is a genus of wrasses endemic to the eastern Indian Ocean waters of Australia first discovered in 1940.

== Species ==
The currently recognized species in this genus are:

- Pictilabrus brauni Hutchins & S. M. Morrison, 1996 (Braun's wrasse)
- Pictilabrus laticlavius (J. Richardson, 1840) (patrician wrasse)
- Pictilabrus viridis B. C. Russell, 1988 (false senator wrasse)
