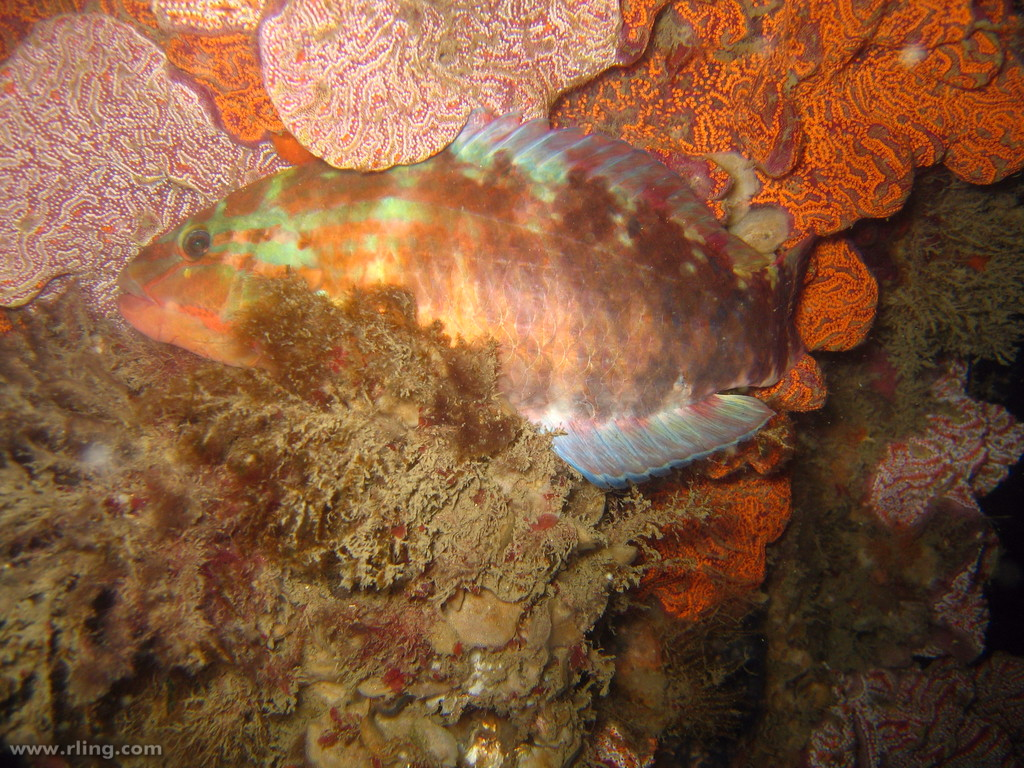
- Sleeping among ascidians

Conservation status
- Least Concern (IUCN 3.1)

Scientific classification
- Kingdom: Animalia
- Phylum: Chordata
- Class: Actinopterygii
- Order: Labriformes
- Family: Labridae
- Genus: Pseudolabrus
- Species: P. guentheri

Binomial name
- Pseudolabrus guentheri Bleeker, 1862

Synonyms
- Labrichthys güntheri (Bleeker, 1862); Labrichthys australis Steindachner, 1866; Pseudolabrus richardsonii Steindachner, 1867; Labrichthys dorsalis Macleay, 1881; Pseudolabrus dorsalis (Macleay, 1881); Labrichthys melanura Macleay, 1881; Pseudolabrus melanurus (Macleay, 1881); Labrichthys dux De Vis, 1883; Labrichthys cruentatus De Vis, 1885; Labrichthys sexlineatus De Vis, 1885; Labrichthys rex De Vis, 1885; Labrichthys maculatus De Vis, 1885

= Pseudolabrus guentheri =

Species of fish

Pseudolabrus guentheri, or Gunther's wrasse, is a ray-finned fish from the wrasse family. It was named for Albert Günther.

== Habitat ==
Gunther's wrasse is a marine species which inhabits rocky and coral reefs generally in shallow water up to 20m in depth. The species feeds on small benthic crustaceans.

== Distribution ==
The species is exclusively known from subtropical eastern Australia, occurring in Queensland as far north as Lindeman Island, and in New South Wales as far south as Botany Bay.

== Name ==
The specific name of this fish honours the British-German ichthyologist and herpetologist Albert Günther 1830-1914).
