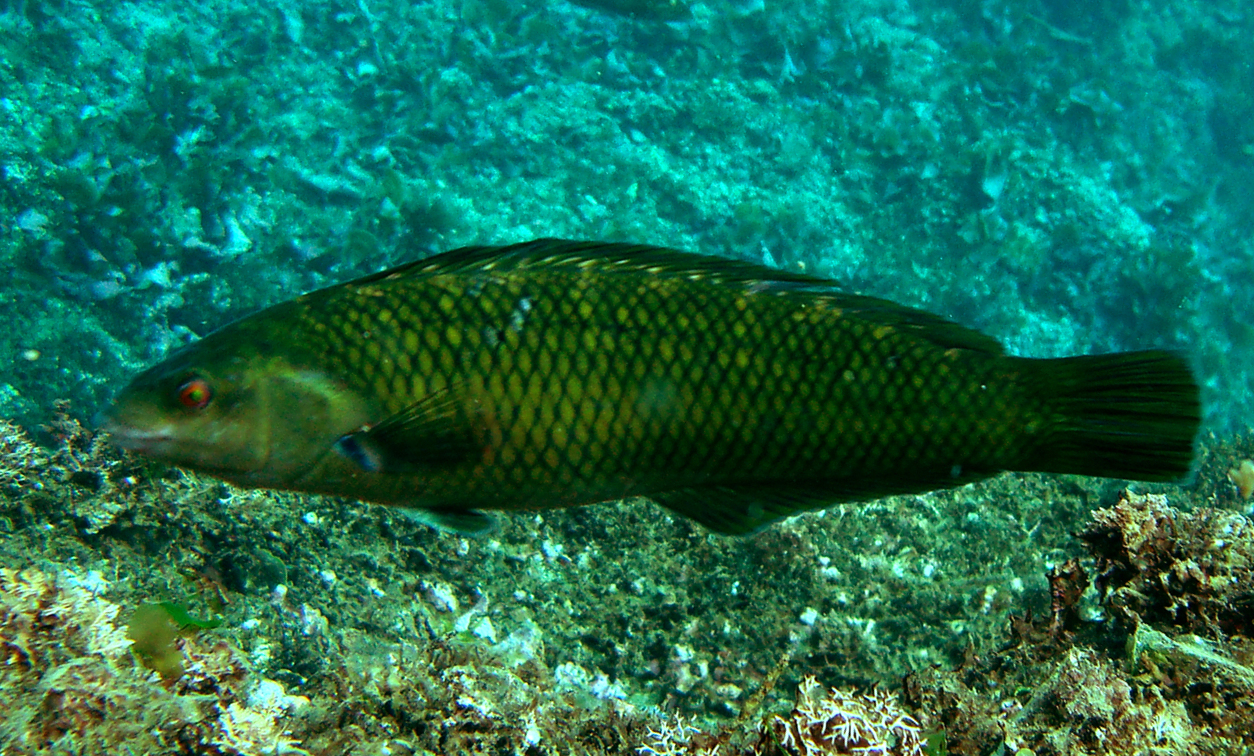

Conservation status
- Data Deficient (IUCN 3.1)

Scientific classification
- Kingdom: Animalia
- Phylum: Chordata
- Class: Actinopterygii
- Division: Teleostei
- Order: Labriformes
- Family: Labridae
- Subfamily: Pseudolabrinae
- Genus: Malapterus; Valenciennes, 1839
- Species: M. reticulatus

Binomial name
- Malapterus reticulatus Valenciennes, 1839

Synonyms
- Genus: Hospilabrus Whitley, 1931; Malacopterus Günther 1862; Neolabrus Steindachner, 1875; Species: Neolabrus fenestratus Steindachner, 1875

= Malapterus =

Species of fish

Malapterus reticulatus is a species of wrasse endemic to the Juan Fernández Islands in the southeastern Pacific Ocean. It is a cleaner of species in the genus Scorpis, eating the isopod ectoparasites in their mouths. This species is the only known member of its genus. It is found in shallow, coastal waters over rocky reefs.
