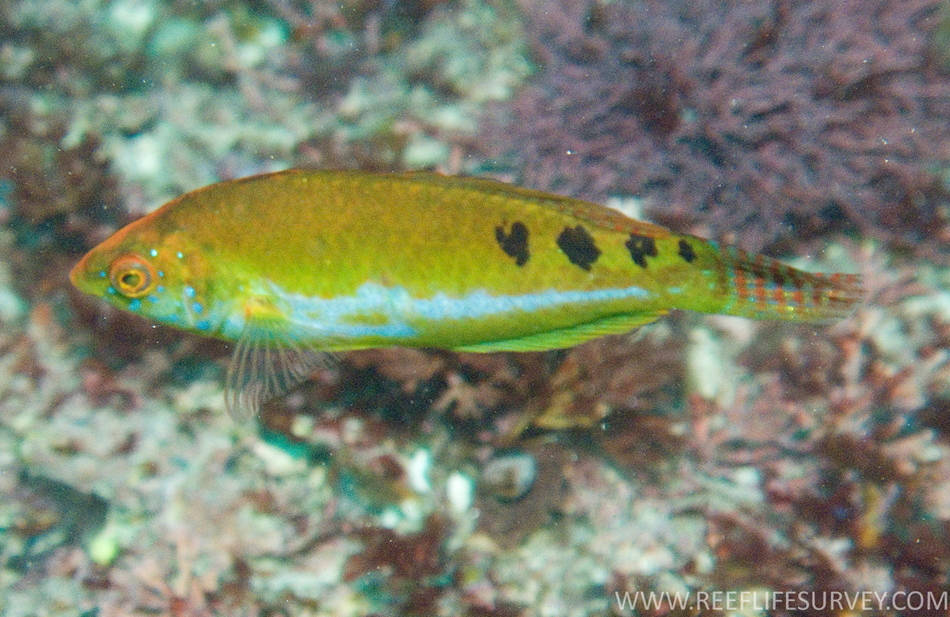

Conservation status
- Least Concern (IUCN 3.1)

Scientific classification
- Kingdom: Animalia
- Phylum: Chordata
- Class: Actinopterygii
- Order: Labriformes
- Family: Labridae
- Genus: Dotalabrus
- Species: D. alleni

Binomial name
- Dotalabrus alleni Russell, 1988

= Little rainbow wrasse =

Species of fish

The little rainbow wrasse (Dotalabrus alleni) is a species of marine ray-finned fish which is classified within the wrasse family Labridae. It is found in the south eastern Indian Ocean off Western Australia from the Recherche Archipelago north to the Houtman Abrolhos islands. The specific name honours Dr. Gerald R. Allen who collected the holotype and a number of paratypes, and the brought Barry Russell's attention to this taxon so that he could describe it.
