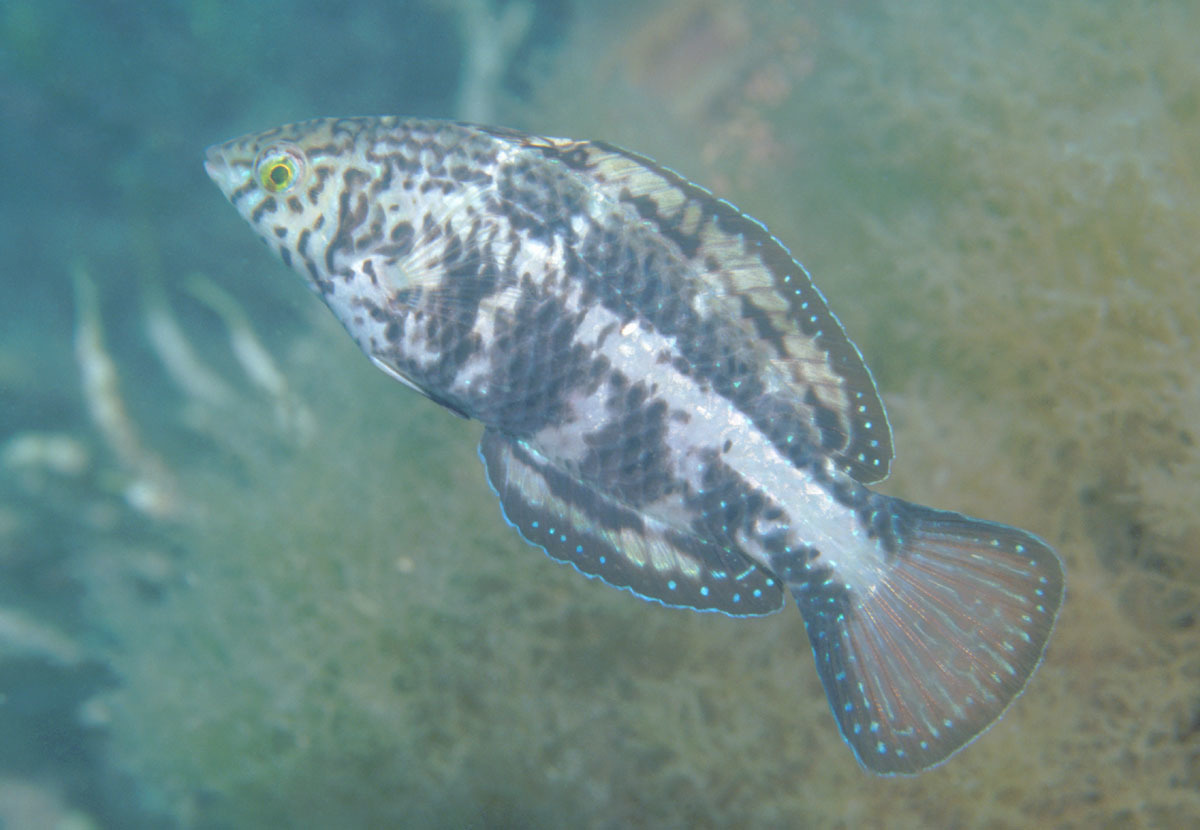
- Dotalabrus aurantiacus

Scientific classification
- Kingdom: Animalia
- Phylum: Chordata
- Class: Actinopterygii
- Division: Teleostei
- Order: Labriformes
- Family: Labridae
- Subfamily: Pseudolabrinae
- Genus: Dotalabrus; Whitley, 1930

Type species
- Cheilinus aurantiacus Castelnau, 1872

= Dotalabrus =

Genus of fishes

Dotalabrus is a genus of wrasses native to the Indian Ocean coasts of Australia.

== Species ==
The currently recognized species in this genus are:

- Dotalabrus alleni B. C. Russell, 1988 (little rainbow wrasse)
- Dotalabrus aurantiacus (Castelnau, 1872) (Castelnau's wrasse)
