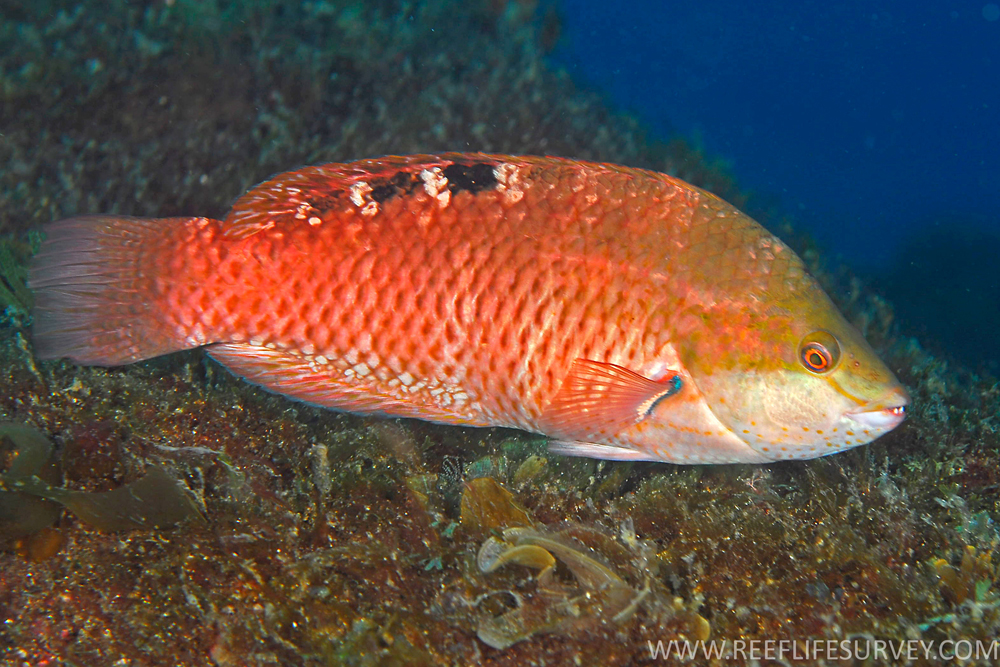

Conservation status
- Least Concern (IUCN 3.1)

Scientific classification
- Kingdom: Animalia
- Phylum: Chordata
- Class: Actinopterygii
- Order: Labriformes
- Family: Labridae
- Genus: Pseudolabrus
- Species: P. luculentus

Binomial name
- Pseudolabrus luculentus (J. Richardson, 1848)

Synonyms
- Labrus luculentus J. Richardson, 1848; Labrichthys luculenta (J. Richardson, 1848); Tautoga luculenta J. Richardson, 1848 (ambiguous)

= Orange wrasse =

Species of fish

The orange wrasse (Pseudolabrus luculentus) is a species of wrasse native to the Pacific Ocean from Australia to New Zealand and the Kermadec Islands. It is found in inshore waters at depths from 10 to 50 metres (33 to 164 ft). It can reach a length of 17 centimetres (6.7 in) SL. It can also be found in the aquarium trade.

== Morphology ==
Female and juvenile orange wrasses are primarily orange with five vertical white bars on their bodies and yellow markings on their heads. Females also have yellow dorsal and anal fins, white spots or lines on the lower half of the body, and white horizontal stripes below the eyes. Male orange wrasses are red-brown and have black-and-white squares beneath the rays of their dorsal fin.

== Distribution and habitat ==
Orange wrasses are found in temperate marine habitats near New Zealand, around the Kermadec Islands, Norfolk Island, the Three Kings Islands, and North-East North Island. In Boat Cove, in the Kermadec Islands, orange wrasses are the most common fish across the reef, with densities of up to 37 per 500 m² in shallow water, and 30 per 500 m² in deep water. Distribution throughout the Kermadec Island has been recorded at various sites, including Lord Howe Island & New South Wales. 70% of the shallow water population (3-6 meters) and 85% of the deep water population (14-20 meters) in Boat Cove consisted of juvenile orange wrasses. Other labrids are abundant in Boat Cove as well.

== Behavior ==
=== Diet ===
Orange wrasses are carnivorous, eating benthic invertebrates such as small crustaceans. Females and juveniles are also facultative cleaners, although they rely less on cleaning for food, and more on benthic feeding.

=== Reproduction and life cycle ===
These fishes form pairs during breeding and are oviparous, meaning that their eggs hatch after being laid. Females spawn eggs from March to October, and the surviving offspring will mature after a year. Orange wrasses are also protogynous hermaphrodites, so the females change sex into males.

== Taxonomy ==
=== Etymology ===
The name "luculentus", meaning splendid, was given due to the species's bright colors.
