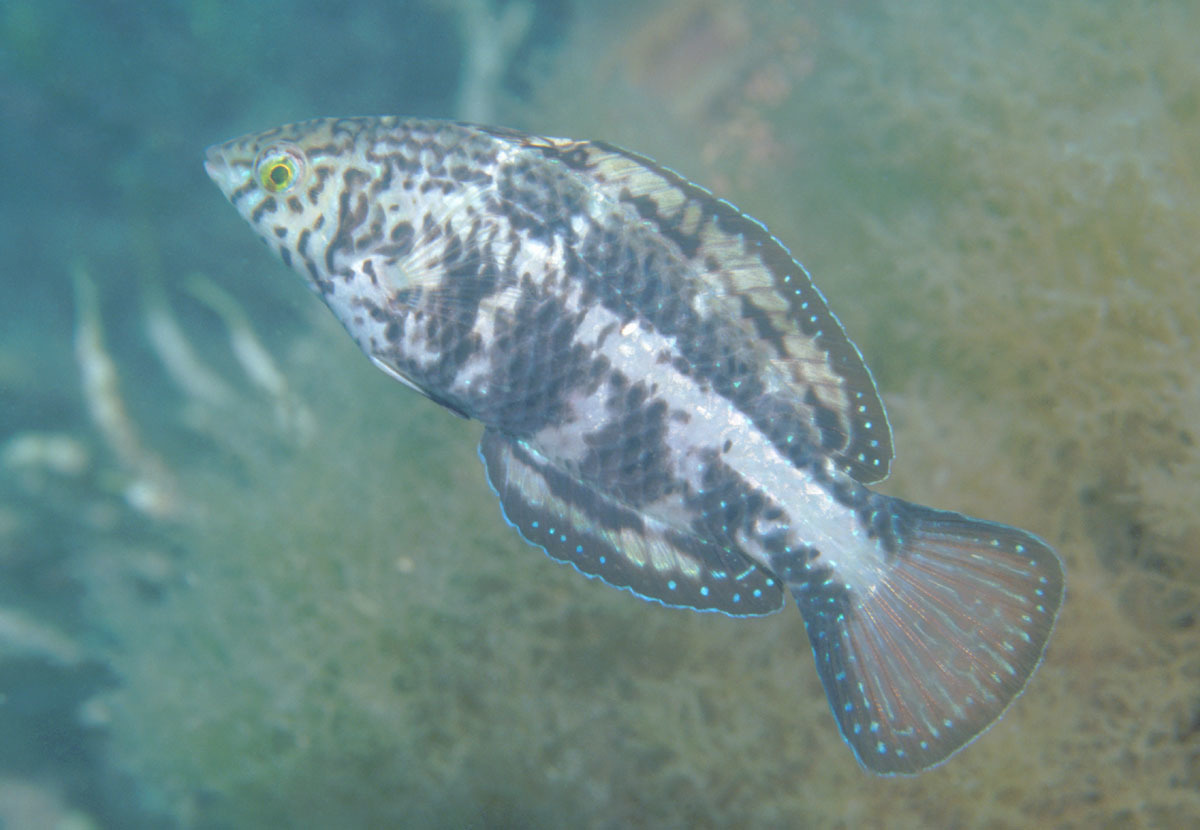

Conservation status
- Least Concern (IUCN 3.1)

Scientific classification
- Kingdom: Animalia
- Phylum: Chordata
- Class: Actinopterygii
- Order: Labriformes
- Family: Labridae
- Genus: Dotalabrus
- Species: D. aurantiacus

Binomial name
- Dotalabrus aurantiacus (Castelnau, 1872)

Synonyms
- Cheilinus aurantiacus Castelnau, 1872; Labrichthys elegans Steindachner, 1883; Labrichthys macleayi Herzenstein, 1896; Pseudolabrus aurantiacus (Castelnau, 1872); Pseudolabrus elegans (Steindachner, 1883); Pseudolabrus macleayi (Herzenstein, 1896)

= Dotalabrus aurantiacus =

Species of fish

Dotalabrus aurantiacus, Castelnau's wrasse, is a species of wrasses native to the Indian Ocean coasts of Australia. It is the type species of its genus. The type locality is Adelaide, St. Vincent Gulf, South Australia.

== See also ==
- List of marine animals of Australia (temperate waters)
