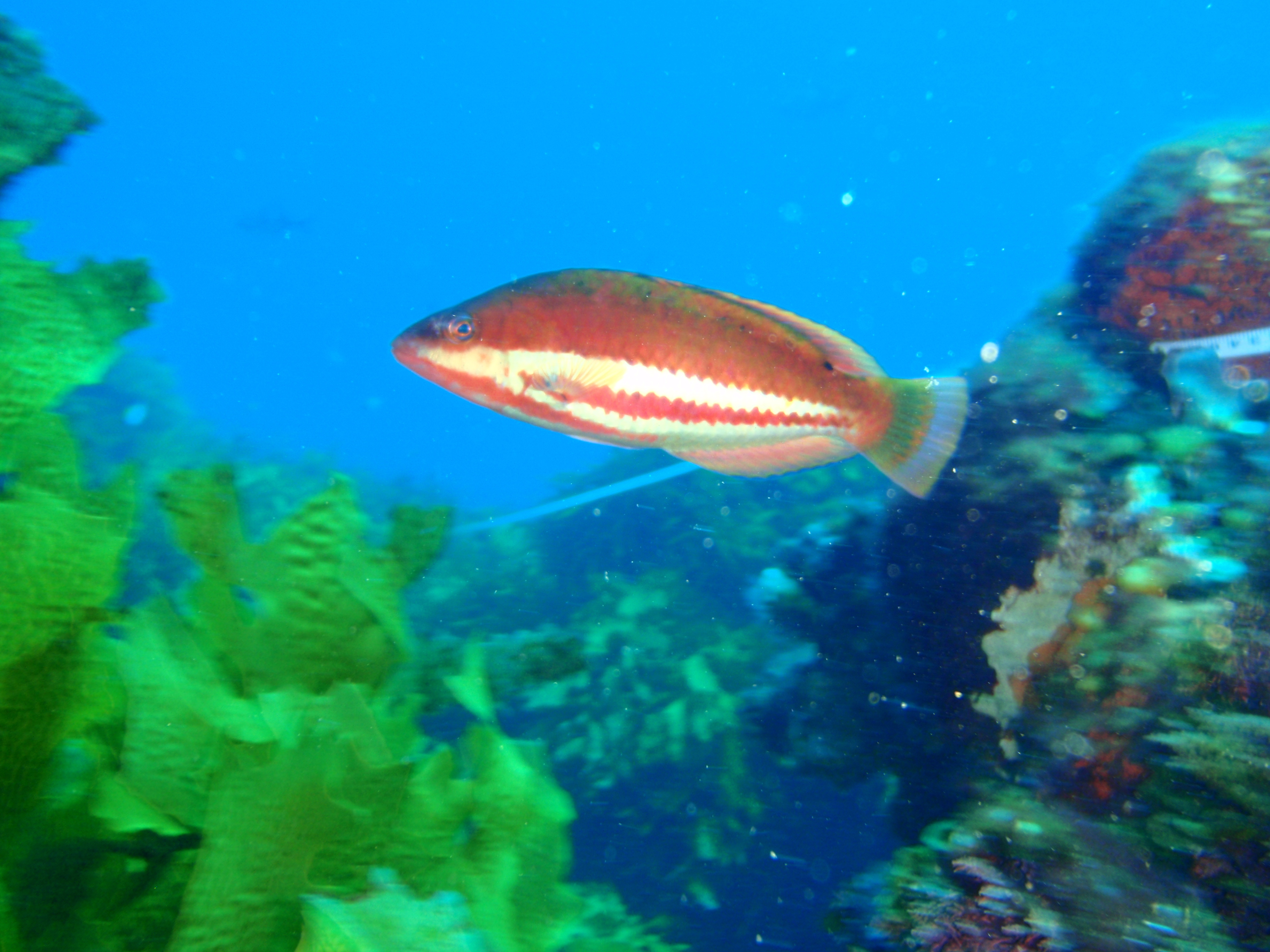
- Redband wrasse (P. biserialis)

Scientific classification
- Domain: Eukaryota
- Kingdom: Animalia
- Phylum: Chordata
- Class: Actinopterygii
- Order: Labriformes
- Family: Labridae
- Genus: Pseudolabrus; Bleeker, 1862

Type species
- Labrus rubiginosus Temminck & Schlegel, 1845

Synonyms
- Lunolabrus Whitley, 1933

= Pseudolabrus =

Genus of fishes

Pseudolabrus is a genus of wrasses native to the eastern Indian Ocean and the Pacific Ocean.

== Species ==
The 12 currently recognized species in this genus are:

- Pseudolabrus biserialis (Klunzinger, 1880) (redband wrasse)
- Pseudolabrus eoethinus (J. Richardson, 1846) (red-naped wrasse)
- Pseudolabrus fuentesi (Regan, 1913) (Fuentesi's wrasse)
- Pseudolabrus gayi (Valenciennes, 1839)
- Pseudolabrus guentheri Bleeker, 1862 (Günther's wrasse)
- Pseudolabrus japonicus (Houttuyn, 1782)
- Pseudolabrus luculentus (J. Richardson, 1848) (orange wrasse)
- Pseudolabrus miles (J. G. Schneider & J. R. Forster, 1801) (scarlet wrasse)
- Pseudolabrus rubicundus (W. J. Macleay, 1881) (rosy wrasse)
- Pseudolabrus semifasciatus (Rendahl (de), 1921) (half-barred wrasse)
- Pseudolabrus sieboldi Mabuchi & Nakabo, 1997
- Pseudolabrus torotai B. C. Russell & J. E. Randall, 1981
