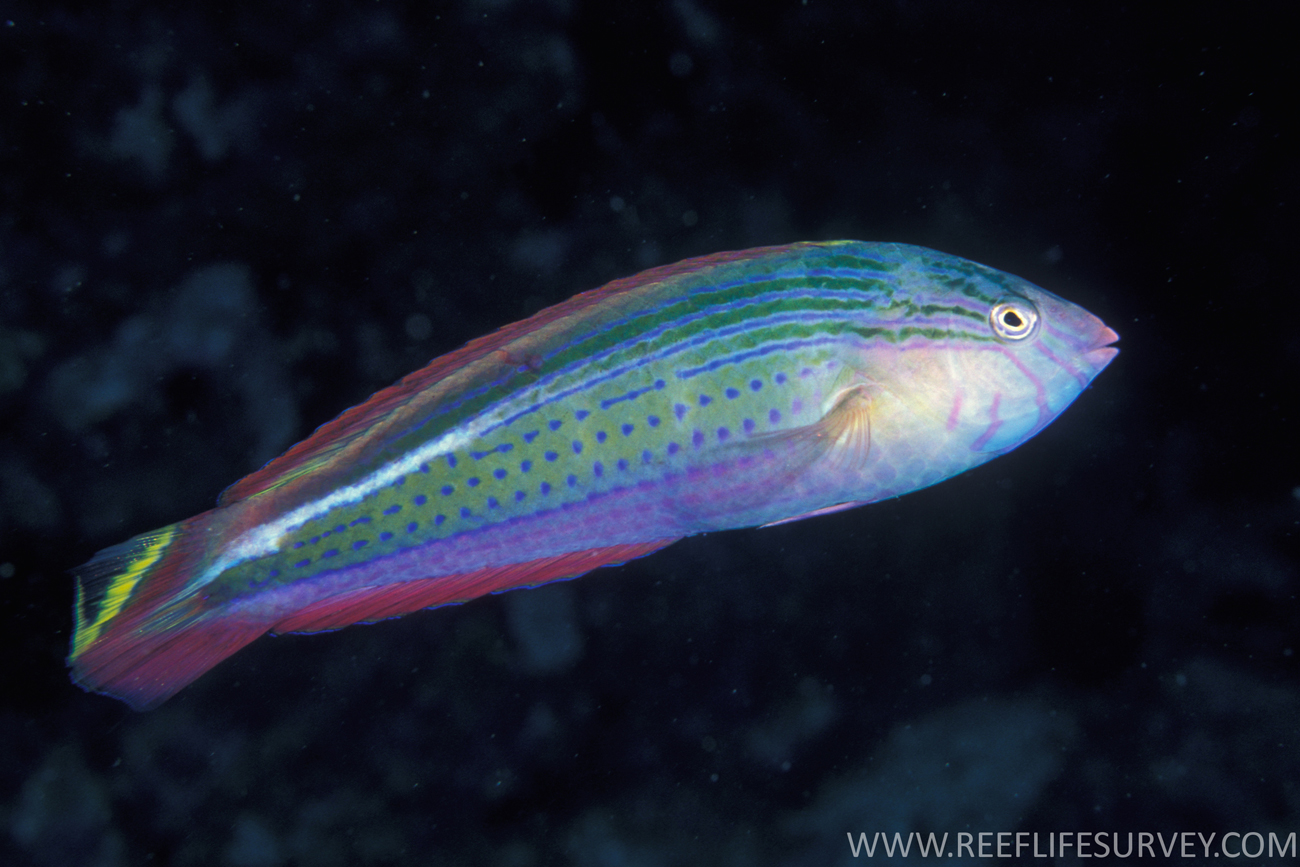

Conservation status
- Least Concern (IUCN 3.1)

Scientific classification
- Kingdom: Animalia
- Phylum: Chordata
- Class: Actinopterygii
- Order: Labriformes
- Family: Labridae
- Genus: Suezichthys
- Species: S. arquatus

Binomial name
- Suezichthys arquatus B. C. Russell, 1985

= Rainbow slender wrasse =

Species of fish

The rainbow slender wrasse (Suezichthys arquatus), also known as the painted rainbow wrasse, is a species of marine ray-finned fish, a wrasse from the family Labridae. It is native to the western Pacific Ocean where it is found from Japan to Australia and east to New Zealand. It occurs on reefs at depths from 13 to 100 m (43 to 328 ft), usually over patches of sand. This species can reach 13.5 cm (5.3 in) in total length.
