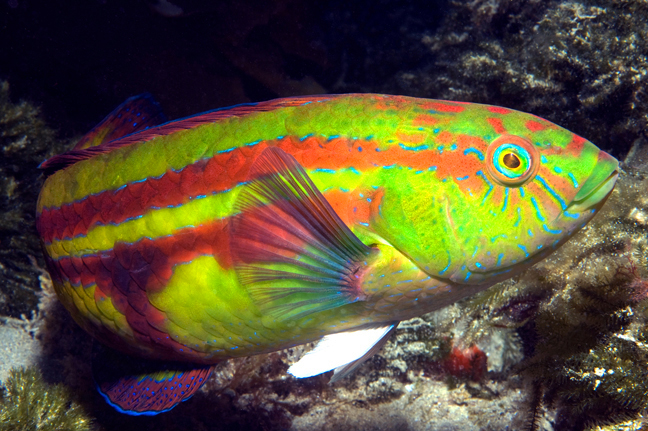
- Male
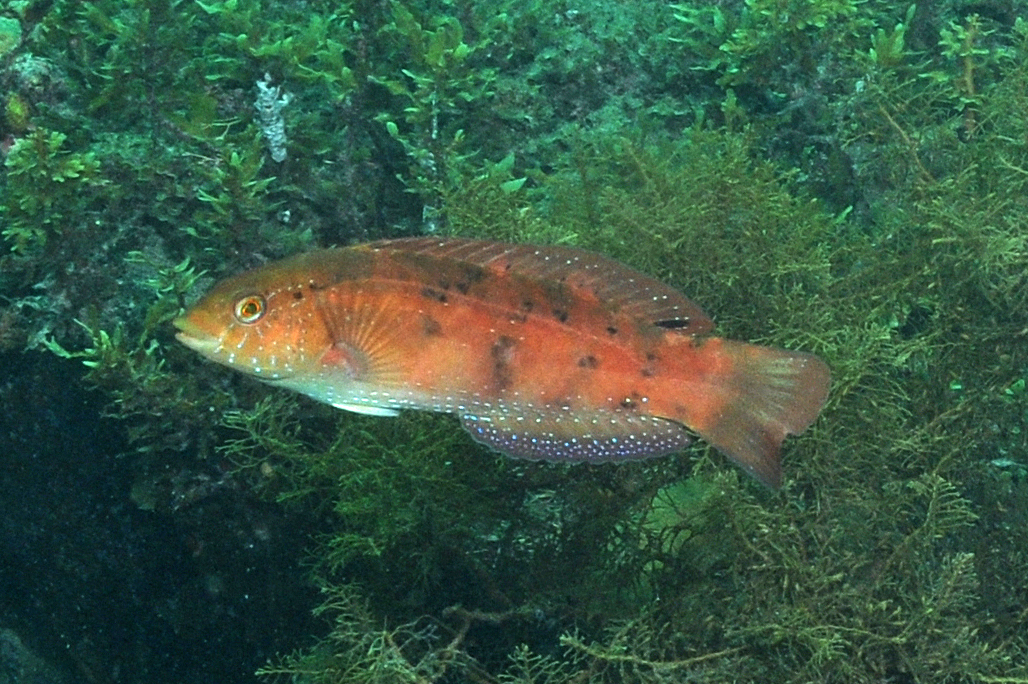
- Female

Conservation status
- Least Concern (IUCN 3.1)

Scientific classification
- Kingdom: Animalia
- Phylum: Chordata
- Class: Actinopterygii
- Order: Labriformes
- Family: Labridae
- Genus: Pictilabrus
- Species: P. laticlavius

Binomial name
- Pictilabrus laticlavius (Richardson, 1840)

Synonyms
- List: Labrus laticlavius Richardson, 1840; Labrichthys laticlavius (Richardson, 1840); Pseudolabrus laticlavius (Richardson, 1840); Tautoga laticlavia (Richardson, 1840); Hemigymnus bleasdalei Castelnau, 1875; Labrichthys labiosa Macleay, 1881; Eupetrichthys gloveri Scott, 1974

= Pictilabrus laticlavius =

Species of fish

Pictilabrus laticlavius, the patrician wrasse, the senator wrasse, the green parrotfish or the purplebanded wrasse is a species of marine ray-finned fish from the family Labridae, the wrasses. It is found in the eastern Indian Ocean and the south western Pacific Oceans off the temperate coasts of southern Australia.

== Taxonomy ==
Pictilabrus lacticlavius was first formally described as Labrus lacticlavius in 1840 by the Scottish naval surgeon and naturalist John Richardson (1787-1865) with the type locality given as Port Arthur in Tasmania. When the American ichthyologist T.N. Gill described the genus Pictilabrus in 1891 he designated Labrus lacticlavius as its type species.

=== Etymology ===
The genus name is a compound of picti meaning "painted" and labrus which is the type genus of the wrasse family, Labridae, and may derive from the Greek labrax meaning a specific type of fish. The specific name refers to the blue spots on the fins which Richardson considered to resemblethe clavi on the borders of the Roman patrician clothing.

== Description ==
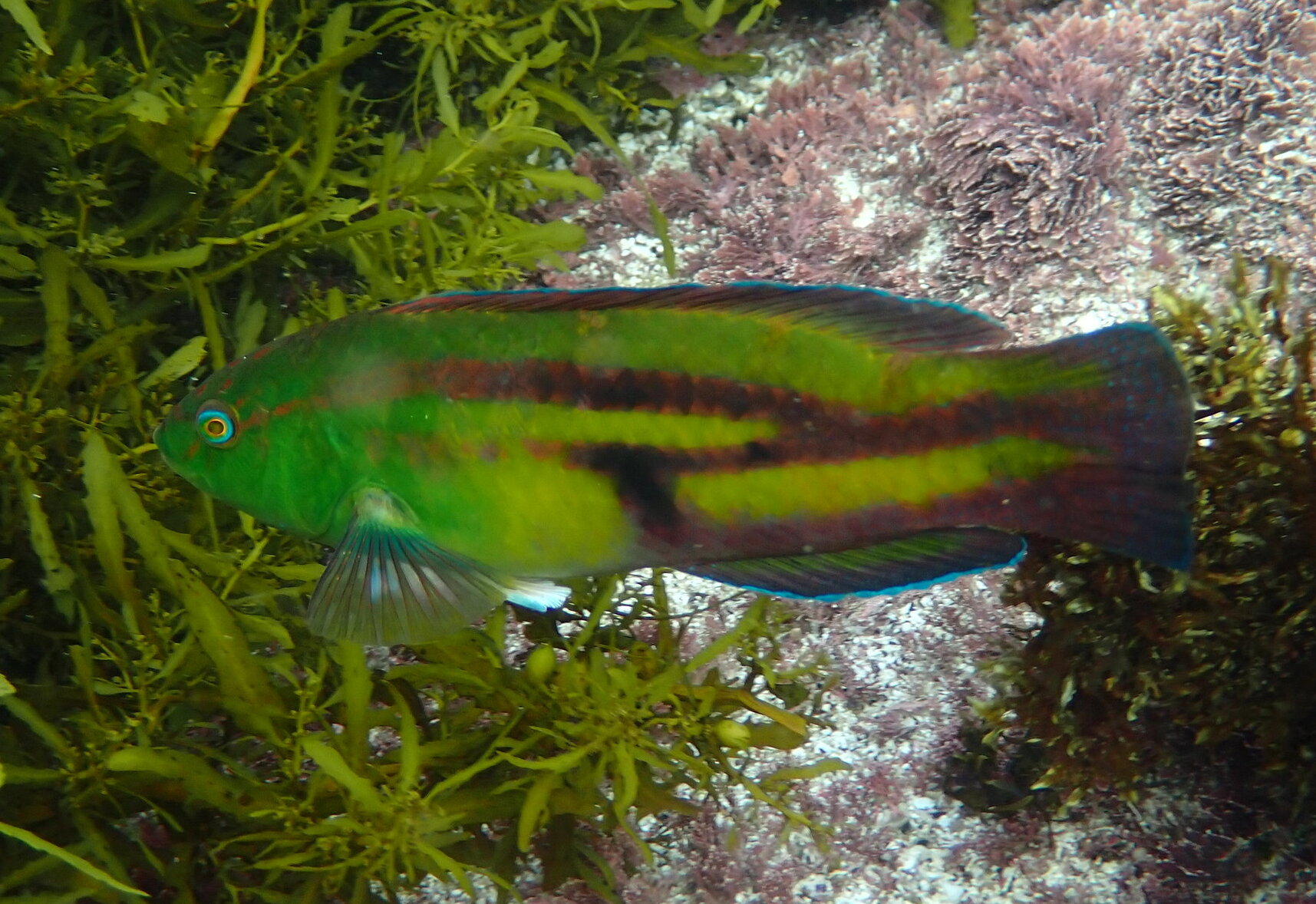
Male

Pictilabrus laticlavius has a moderately deep laterally compressed body, in which the height is 26-32% of its standard length. The head is quite large and is equipped with relatively large eyes and a small mouth in which the upper jaw does not reach the eye. The jaws are armed with small, canine-like teeth, the front pair in the lower jaw and the front two pairs in the upper jawbeing enlarged and recurved and there is and enlarged canine on each side of the posterior end of the upper jaw. This species has moderately large, cycloid scales which are firmly attached and which cover its body, although the head is naked apart from one to three rows scales on the cheek and eight to ten large scales on the gill cover. The lateral-line shows an abrupt downwards curve below the rearmost spines in the dorsal fin. The dorsal fin is continuous, with an elongated base and it is uniform in height along its length. The anal fin is similar to the posterior portion of the dorsal fin and is placed opposite it. The caudal fin is truncate while the pectoral fins are short and rounded and the pelvic fins are aloe short and are positioned with their origins underneath the base of the pectoral fins and do not reach the vicinity of the anus.

The males of this species are mainly green with maroon or purplish stripes along their flanks. The females and juveniles are reddish to greenish-brown in colour and have a row of black spots above their lateral line as well as 4-5 blackish bars on their lower flanks and a black spot on the posterior portion of the dorsal fin.

== Distribution ==
Pictilabrus lacticlavius is endemic to the waters off temperate southern Australia from New South Wales to southern Western Australia, its distribution extends from Byron Bay in New South Wales to the Houtman Abrolhos in Western Australia and extends to Tasmania

== Biology ==
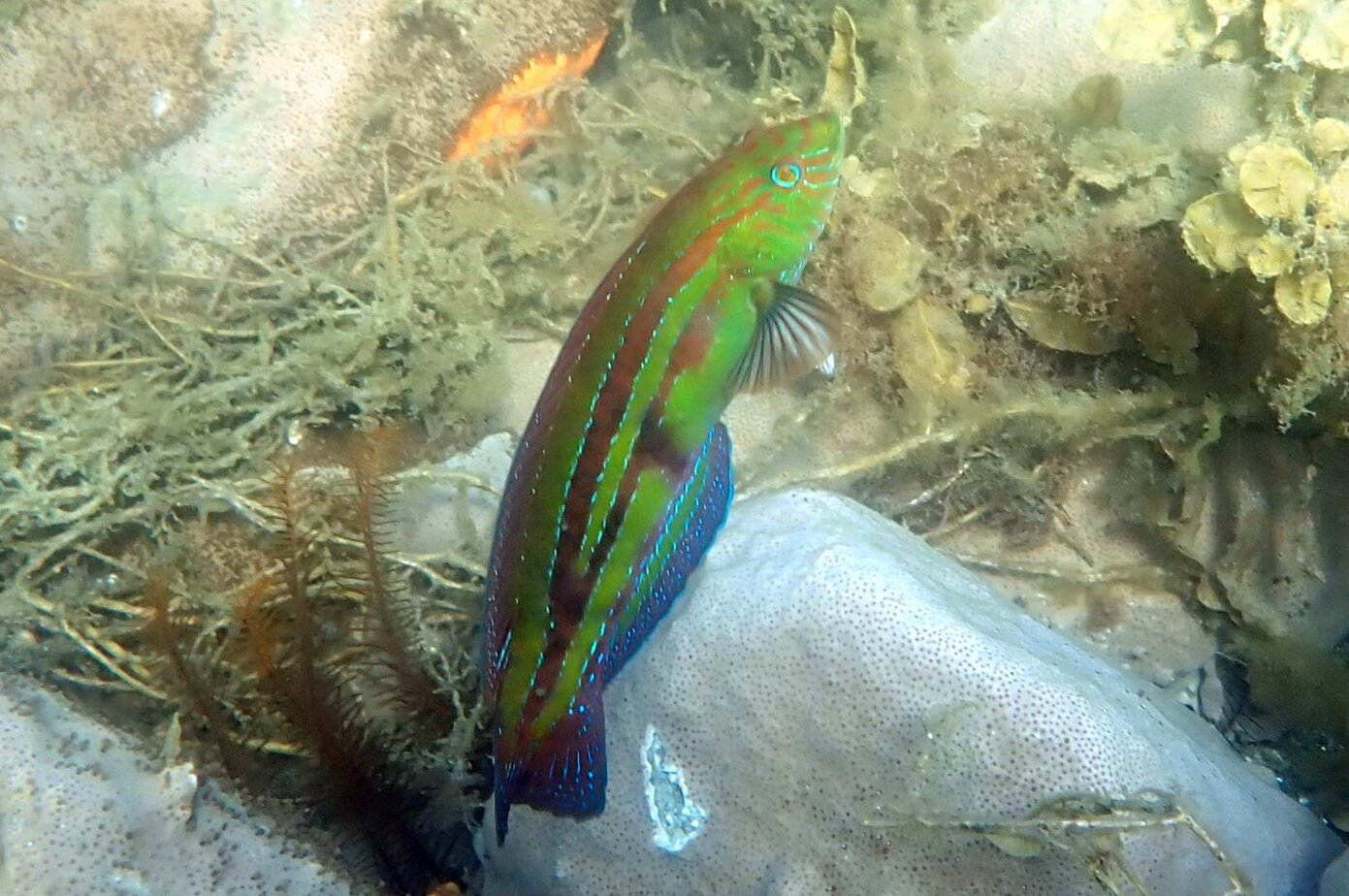
Male

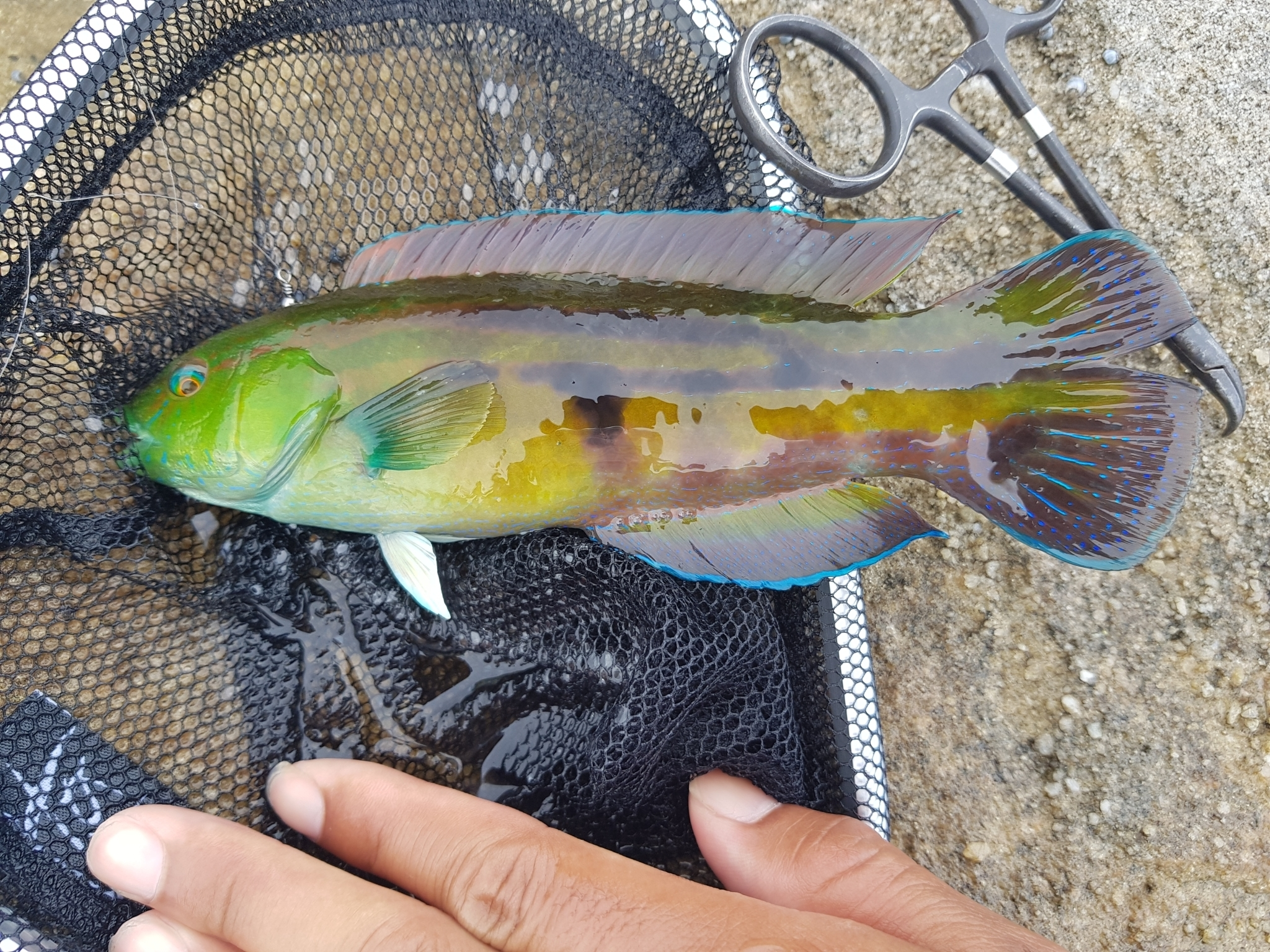
Male

Pictilabrus lacticlavius lives in rock reefs which are clothed in weed, occurruing to depths of 40 metres (130 ft). This is a carnivorous species and its prey includes a variety of invertebrates including gastropods, amphipods and small shrimps and crabs.

Like many wrasse, P. lacticlaviatus is a protogynous hermaphrodite and shows sexual dichromatism in which the females hold territories which overlap while the males, at least when breeding, guard an exclusive territory. The spawining season depends on locale, occurring earlier in the Spring farther north and later in the cooler waters of the southern parts of its range. They can reach sexual maturity within a year and with a total length of greater than 95 millimetres (3.7 in). In 3 years they can reach a total length of 180 millimetres (7.1 in) and they live for at least 4.8 years and they may live as long as 10 years. They change sex from female to male when they attain a total length of approximately 130–150 millimetres (5.1–5.9 in), which is at an age of around 2 years old in New South Wales and may take between at least 3 and 5 plus years in Tasmania.

== Human usage ==
Pictilabrus lacticlavius is a quarry species for angling and may also be caught as bycatch by commercial fisheries.
