= Mather (surname) =

Mather is an English surname and may refer to:

== People ==
- Alonzo C. Mather (1848–1941), president of the Mather Stock Car Company
- Barrie-Jon Mather (born 1973), Great Britain and England international rugby league and rugby union player
- Barry Mather (1909–1982), Canadian journalist
- Bruce Mather (born 1939), Canadian composer
- Cameron Mather (born 1973), Scottish international rugby union player
- Carol Mather (1919–2006), British Army officer and Conservative Member of Parliament
- Cotton Mather (1663–1728), Puritan minister
- David Mather (cricketer) (born 1975), English cricketer
- Elizabeth Mather (1815–1882), American writer
- Evan Mather (born 1970), American landscape architect, urban designer and filmmaker
- Fred Mather (1833–1900), United States pisciculturist
- Frederic Gregory Mather (1844–1925), United States journalist
- Frank Jewett Mather (1868–1953), American art critic
- George R. Mather (1911–1993), American four-star general
- Hiram F. Mather (1796–1868), New York politician
- Increase Mather (1639–1723), Puritan minister
- James Mather (politician) (1750–1821), Mayor of New Orleans
- Jim Mather (born 1947), Scottish politician
- Joe Mather (born 1982), American baseball player
- John Mather (disambiguation), several people
- Keir Mather (born 1998), British politician
- Kenneth Mather (1911–1990), British geneticist
- Kevin Mather, American baseball executive and accountant
- Kevin Mather (archer) (born 1982), American archer and skier
- Kirtley F. Mather (1888–1978), American geologist
- Malcolm B. Mather (1898–1980), British aerial observer
- Margrethe Mather (1886–1939), American photographer and painter
- Melissa Mather, Australian physicist
- Moses Mather (1719–1806), Connecticut clergyman
- Mysterious Dave Mather (1851–unknown), American gunfighter
- Patricia Mather (1925–2012), Australian zoologist
- Percy C. Mather (1884–1933), British missionary to China
- Richard Mather (1596–1669), American Congregational clergyman
- Richard B. Mather (1913–2014), American Sinologist
- Richard Henry Mather (1835–1890), American professor of Greek at Amherst College
- Ronald Mather (1927–2011), English rugby league footballer of the 1950s for Lancashire, and Wigan
- Stephen Mather (1867–1930), American industrialist, conservationist, and first director of the National Park Service
- Weslyn Mather (1945–2015), Canadian politician
- William G. Mather (1857–1951), head of the Cleveland-Cliffs Iron Company
- William Williams Mather (1804–1859), United States geologist

== Fictional characters ==
- Lowell Mather, sitcom character

== See also ==
- Mathers
