= Aplidium abditum =

Scientific classification
- Domain: Eukaryota
- Kingdom: Animalia
- Phylum: Chordata
- Subphylum: Tunicata
- Class: Ascidiacea
- Order: Aplousobranchia
- Family: Polyclinidae
- Genus: Aplidium
- Species: A. abditum

Binomial name
- Aplidium abditum (Kott, 2006)

Species of sea squirt

Aplidium abditum is a sea squirt in the family Polyclinidae and was first described in 2006 by Patricia Kott, from a specimen (SAM E3268) collected at 6-8 m depth at Port Davey, Tasmania.
