= Richard Mather (disambiguation) =

Richard Mather (1596–1669) was a Puritan minister in colonial Boston.

Other people named Richard Mather include:

- Richard B. Mather (1913–2014), American sinologist
- Richard Henry Mather (1835–1890), American professor of Greek
- Richard "Dick" Mather (1941–1997), Canadian politician

== See also ==
- Richard Mathers
