= Aplidium acroporum =

Scientific classification
- Domain: Eukaryota
- Kingdom: Animalia
- Phylum: Chordata
- Subphylum: Tunicata
- Class: Ascidiacea
- Order: Aplousobranchia
- Family: Polyclinidae
- Genus: Aplidium
- Species: A. acroporum

Binomial name
- Aplidium acroporum (Kott, 1992)

Species of sea squirt

Aplidium acroporum is a sea squirt in the family Polyclinidae and was first described in 1992 by Patricia Kott, from a specimen collected at off Spencer Gulf, SA.
