= Aplidiopsis sabulosa =

Scientific classification
- Domain: Eukaryota
- Kingdom: Animalia
- Phylum: Chordata
- Subphylum: Tunicata
- Class: Ascidiacea
- Order: Aplousobranchia
- Family: Polyclinidae
- Genus: Aplidiopsis
- Species: A. sabulosa

Binomial name
- Aplidiopsis sabulosa Kott. 1992

Species of tunicate

Aplidiopsis sabulosa is a species of sea-squirt in the family Polyclinidae, and was first described in 1992 by Patricia Kott.

It is found in waters off South Australia.
