= Aplidiopsis confluata =

Scientific classification
- Kingdom: Animalia
- Phylum: Chordata
- Subphylum: Tunicata
- Class: Ascidiacea
- Order: Aplousobranchia
- Family: Polyclinidae
- Genus: Aplidiopsis
- Species: A. confluata

Binomial name
- Aplidiopsis confluata Kott. 1992
- Holotype locality (QM GH5514) Ninepin Island, TAS

Species of tunicate

Aplidiopsis confluata is a species of sea-squirt in the family Polyclinidae, and was first described in 1992 by Patricia Kott.

It is known only from its type locality in Tasmania.
