= Aplidium abyssum =

Scientific classification
- Kingdom: Animalia
- Phylum: Chordata
- Subphylum: Tunicata
- Class: Ascidiacea
- Order: Aplousobranchia
- Family: Polyclinidae
- Genus: Aplidium
- Species: A. abyssum

Binomial name
- Aplidium abyssum (Kott, 1969)

Species of sea squirt

Aplidium abyssum is a sea squirt in the family Polyclinidae and was first described in 1969 by Patricia Kott,

As with all sea squirts, this species is sessile. It is found in Antarctic waters at depths ranging from 3500 – 6250 metres.
