= Synoicum syrtis =

Scientific classification
- Kingdom: Animalia
- Phylum: Chordata
- Subphylum: Tunicata
- Class: Ascidiacea
- Order: Aplousobranchia
- Family: Polyclinidae
- Genus: Synoicum
- Species: S. syrtis

Binomial name
- Synoicum syrtis Kott, 2006
- Holotype site QM G308757)

Species of tunicate

Synoicum syrtis is a sea squirt in the family Polyclinidae and was first described in 2006 by Patricia Kott, from a specimen (QM G308757) collected at a depth of 63 metres from the Great Barrier Reef.
