= Aplidium laticum =

Scientific classification
- Kingdom: Animalia
- Phylum: Chordata
- Subphylum: Tunicata
- Class: Ascidiacea
- Order: Aplousobranchia
- Family: Polyclinidae
- Genus: Aplidium
- Species: A. laticum

Binomial name
- Aplidium laticum (Kott, 2006)
- Type site Banks Strait

Species of sea squirt

Aplidium laticum is a sea squirt in the family Polyclinidae and was first described in 2006 by Patricia Kott.
