= Aplidium formosum =

Scientific classification
- Domain: Eukaryota
- Kingdom: Animalia
- Phylum: Chordata
- Subphylum: Tunicata
- Class: Ascidiacea
- Order: Aplousobranchia
- Family: Polyclinidae
- Genus: Aplidium
- Species: A. formosum

Binomial name
- Aplidium formosum (Kott, 2006)

Species of sea squirt

Aplidium formosum is a sea squirt in the family Polyclinidae and was first described in 2006 by Patricia Kott, from a specimen (SAM E2899) collected at 3 m depth in Port Adelaide, South Australia.
