= Synoicum sphinctorum =

Scientific classification
- Domain: Eukaryota
- Kingdom: Animalia
- Phylum: Chordata
- Subphylum: Tunicata
- Class: Ascidiacea
- Order: Aplousobranchia
- Family: Polyclinidae
- Genus: Synoicum
- Species: S. sphinctorum

Binomial name
- Synoicum sphinctorum Kott, 2006

Species of sea squirt

Synoicum sphinctorum is a sea squirt in the family Polyclinidae and was first described in 2006 by Patricia Kott, from a specimen (SAM E3283) collected from a rock wall at a depth of 10-14 metres between Western River Cove and Snug Cove on Kangaroo Island.
