= Aplidiopsis mammillata =

Scientific classification
- Domain: Eukaryota
- Kingdom: Animalia
- Phylum: Chordata
- Subphylum: Tunicata
- Class: Ascidiacea
- Order: Aplousobranchia
- Family: Polyclinidae
- Genus: Aplidiopsis
- Species: A. mammillata

Binomial name
- Aplidiopsis mammillata Kott. 1992

Species of tunicate

Aplidiopsis mammillata is a species of sea-squirt in the family Polyclinidae, and was first described in 1992 by Patricia Kott.

It is found in the IMCRA region of Spencer Gulf Shelf Province (in the waters off South Australia).
