= James Mather =

James Mather may refer to:

- James Mather (politician) (c. 1750–1821), mayor of New Orleans
- James Mather (sound editor), British sound editor
- James Mather (1738–1796), co-founder of whaling company Mather & Co.

== See also ==
- Jim Mather (born 1947), Scottish National Party politician
- James Mathers (disambiguation)
