= Synoicum adareanum =

Scientific classification
- Domain: Eukaryota
- Kingdom: Animalia
- Phylum: Chordata
- Subphylum: Tunicata
- Class: Ascidiacea
- Order: Aplousobranchia
- Family: Polyclinidae
- Genus: Synoicum
- Species: S. adareanum

Binomial name
- Synoicum adareanum Herdman, 1902

Synonyms
- Amaroucium steineni (Michaelsen, 1907); Atopogaster incerta (Hartmeyer, 1909); Lissamaroucium magnum Sluiter, 1906; Macroclinum incertum Hartmeyer, 1909; Macroclinum magnum (Sluiter, 1906); Oxycorynia mawsoni Harant & Vernieres, 1938; Polyclinum adareanum Herdman, 1902; Synoicum steineni Michaelsen, 1907

Species of sea squirt

Synoicum adareanum is a species of sea squirt that inhabits the Antarctic sea floor around the Anvers Island archipelago. Within the species, a bacterium has been identified that is a member of a new and previously unstudied genus, Candidatus Synoicihabitans palmerolidicus.
