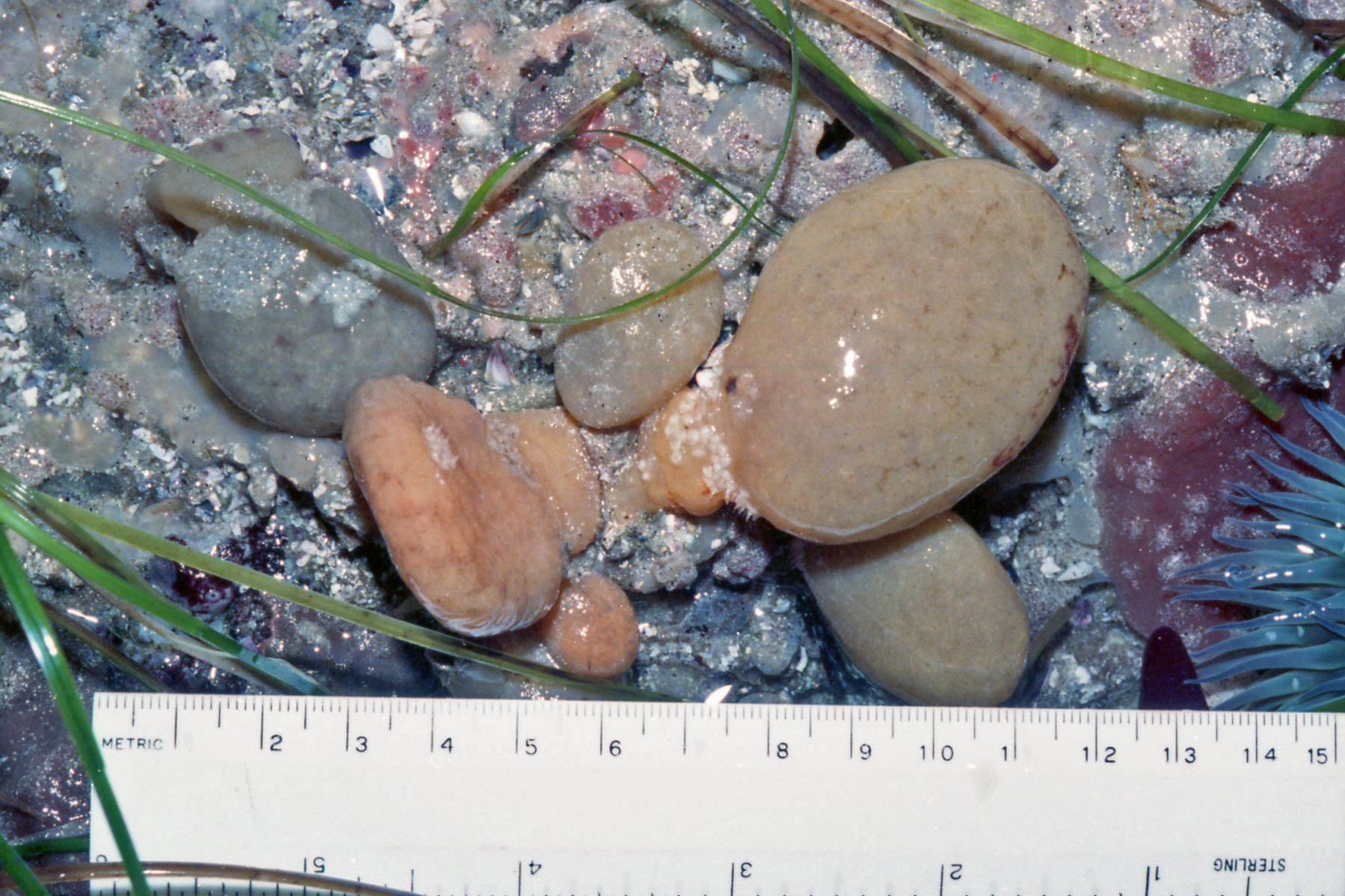
- A cluster of colonies of the compound ascidian Polyclinum planum attached to a rock at -1.0 ft MLLW in the intertidal zone at the Hopkins Marine Station, Pacific Grove, California, USA

Scientific classification
- Kingdom: Animalia
- Phylum: Chordata
- Subphylum: Tunicata
- Class: Ascidiacea
- Order: Aplousobranchia
- Family: Polyclinidae
- Genus: Polyclinum
- Species: P. planum

Binomial name
- Polyclinum planum (Ritter & Forsyth, 1917)

= Polyclinum planum =

Species of sea squirt

Polyclinum planum is a compound ascidian commonly known as the elephant ear tunicate. It is an ascidian tunicate in the family Polyclinidae. Ascidians are also known as sea squirts.

== Description ==
Polyclinum planum colonies are variable in color ranging from olive greenish to brown to yellowish tan. Colonies of this species have a tough flexible peduncle located along one margin of the zooid-bearing lobe by which they are attached to a hard substrate. The pharynx of each zooid (colony member) has 13-17 rows of stigmata (ciliated openings) that they use for filter-feeding. The zooid-bearing lobe is roughly spherical in colonies less than 1 or 2 cm in diameter, the lobe becomes laterally compressed into sort of a tongue or pancake shape as the colony increases in size, and the lobe can be 2.5 to more than 10 times wider than it is thick. Each zooid in the colony maintains its own oral siphon (incurrent opening) while the cloacal siphon (excurrent opening) empties into a pocket-like cloacal opening that is shared by multiple zooids.

== Distribution and habitat ==
The geographic range of P. planum extends from the lowest levels of the rocky intertidal zone to depths of 30+meters along the Pacific coast of North America, from northern California south to Baja California A few species surveys report this species in Japan and Peru, but P. planum is best documented in California.

Intertidal individuals are attached to sides and upper surfaces of rocks at -1.0 MLLW and below, while subtidal individuals are most typically found attached to vertical rock surfaces.

== Development and life history ==
Young Polyclinum planum colonies appeared every month of the year at intertidal research plots at the southern end of Monterey Bay, California, USA, and these colonies survived on average for about 5.5 months, though the longest lived colony monitored to date lived 24 months. Colonies grow rapidly by a form of cloning described below. Because the growth of colonies of P. planum is indeterminate it becomes impossible to estimate a colony's age by its size after only a few months.

Mature colonies produce eggs year round. The eggs develop into ascidian tadpole larvae, thus named because of their general similarity in shape to frog tadpoles, though ascidian tadpole larvae are much smaller and anatomically different than those of frog tadpoles. Embryos and larvae develop while residing in the excurrent atrium of the parent zooid, and larvae are released into the water when they are competent to swim. Once in the water these non-feeding larvae are initially photo-positive and swim upward for a 2–10 minutes when their behavior changes and they become photo-negative and swim to the bottom where they attach to any available hard substrate.

Larvae undergo metamorphosis and become filter-feeding zooids within 5–15 minutes of settlement. A newly settled individual is called an oozooid and is the founding member of a new P. planum colony. The oozooid is covered by a protective outer covering that it secretes. This covering is called the tunic and is made of a cellulose material called tunicin. Cellulose is, by the way, a highly unusual material for any animal ro secrete since it is normally produced by plants. When an oozooid acquires sufficient size it undergoes a form of cloning called strobilation during which its body is pinched into 2 to 6 buds (also known as strobilae) which are still protected by the tunic. Each bud subsequently develops into a fully functional zooid by regeneration. When these daughter zooids get large enough they also undergo strobilation, and the colony increases in size as new zooids are produced.

Because P. planum colonies increase in size through cloning, every zooid in a colony is genetically identical to each other. In addition, colonies of P. planum have never been observed to fragment as some other kinds of clonal animals do.

== Ecology ==
The ecology of Polyclinum planum is not well documented, though like almost all other tunicates it makes its living by filter feeding, also known as suspension feeding. Rows of small cilia-lined openings called stigmata are found in the wall of this each zooid's large pharynx. Beating of cilia pulls water and small particles into the pharynx through the incurrent oral siphon. At the same time a long thin structure called the endostyle that is located along the ventral wall of the pharynx secretes a thin sheet of mucus that is continuously drawn dorsally along the inner walls of the pharynx. Water that enters the pharynx passes through the mucous sheet but particles including phytoplankton, detritus, etc., become trapped in the mucus which is continuously rolled into a rope and swallowed by the zooid at the dorsal margin of the pharynx. Water exiting the pharynx enters a space called the atrium and then exits the body via the cloacal siphon (excurrent opening).

P. planum is reported to harbor more kinds of surface bacteria and protists than another tunicate Cystodytes lobatus which apparently discourages bacterial settlement via chemical deterrents that P. planum lacks.

The only known predator of P. planum is the leather seastar Dermasterias imbricata which is also known to feed on a wide variety of sponges, cnidarians, and ascidians though the impact of seastar predation on populations of P. planum is not known. Most prospective predators are believed to be discouraged from preying on P. planum due to high levels of polyclinal, a sulfated polyhydroxy benzaldehyde that it produces and which is found in highest concentrations in the outermost layer of tunic material.

An unidentified amphipod crustacean is known to excavate a narrow slit in the outer tunic layer of intertidal P. planum, crawl into the slit with its carapace facing into the tunic and feeding appendages outward, and remain there indefinitely. This situation is definitely beneficial to the amphipod, but the effect of the relationship on the tunicate remains a mystery.

The greatest known ecological threat to intertidal P. planum colonies is dislodgement by heavy surf or wave action, and larger colonies are more susceptible to being ripped off of rocks and washed away during a storm or in heavy surf than smaller colonies,

Evidence from one study suggests that the intertidal range of P. planum, designated as a southern species along the Pacific coast of North America, may be shifting northward under the influence of warming due to global climate change
