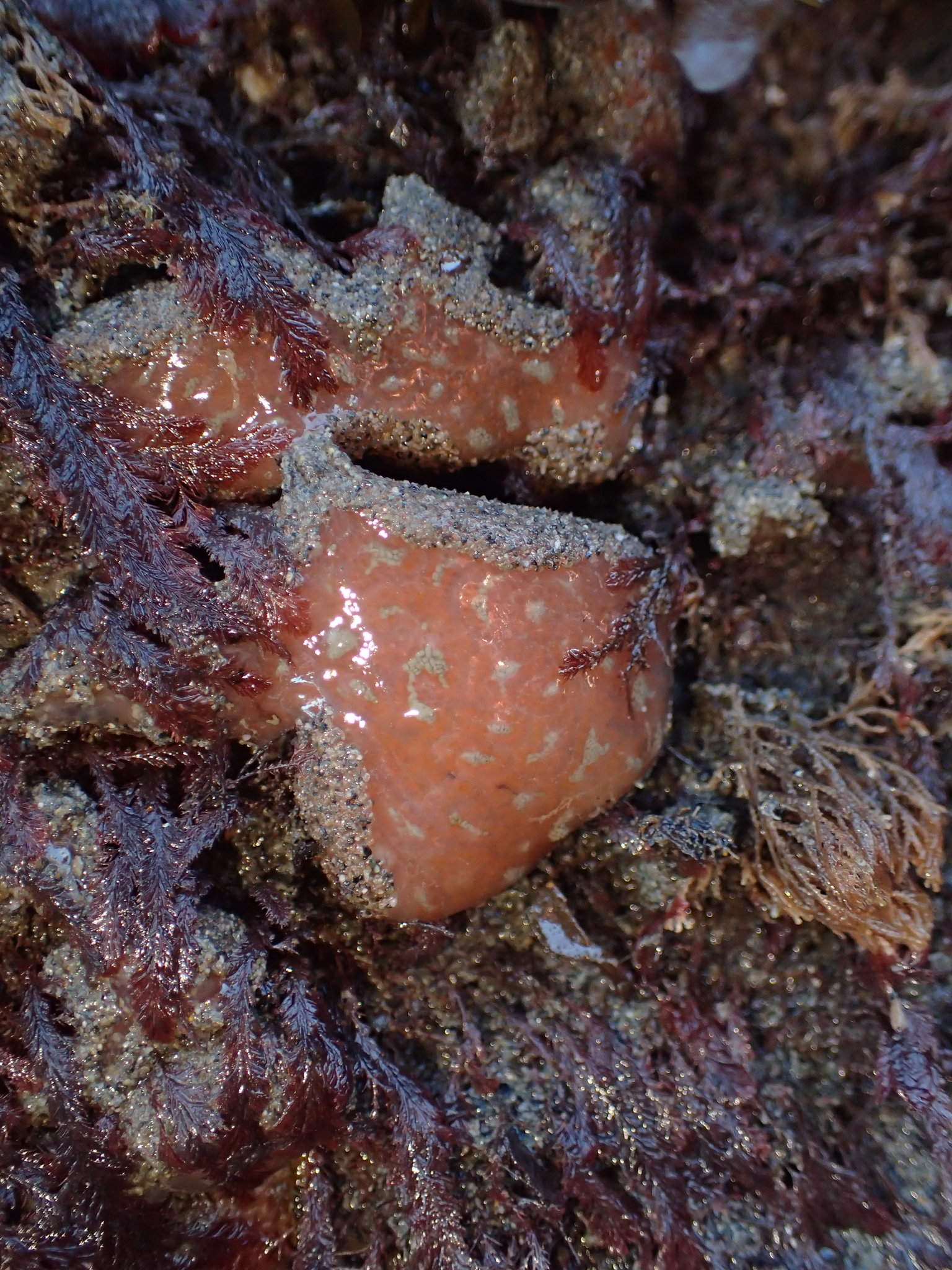

Scientific classification
- Kingdom: Animalia
- Phylum: Chordata
- Subphylum: Tunicata
- Class: Ascidiacea
- Order: Aplousobranchia
- Family: Polyclinidae
- Genus: Aplidium
- Species: A. solidum

Binomial name
- Aplidium solidum (Ritter & Forsyth, 1917)

Synonyms
- Amaroucium solidum Ritter & Forsyth, 1917; Aplidium arboratum Kott, 1963; Aplidium incrustans (Herdman, 1891); Psammaplidium fragile Herdman, 1891; Psammaplidium incrustans Herdman, 1891; Psammaplidium lobatum Herdman, 1891; Psammaplidium solidum Herdman, 1891; Synoicum investum Kott, 1963

= Aplidium solidum =

Species of tunicate

Aplidium solidum is a species of colonial sea squirts, a tunicate in the family Polyclinidae. It is commonly known as the red ascidian or sea pork.

== Description ==
Aplidium solidum is a compound tunicate forming sheets or slabs up to 20 cm across on rocks and other hard substrates. The tunic is gelatinous but firm in consistency, 2 to 3 cm thick and a red or pink colour. The individual zooids are bright red, 12 mm long and arranged in small systems. There are usually 13 to 15 rows of gill-like perforations in the pharynx of each.

== Distribution ==
The type location of Aplidium solidum is Pemba Island, Tanzania and it is also found in Australian waters. It occurs on the west coast of North America from British Columbia south to California where it is common on rocks, especially among the holdfasts of kelp forests, and pilings. It occurs in the intertidal zone and at depths down to 40 metres.

== Biology ==
Aplidium solidum is a filter feeder. Water is sucked into the interior of the organism through an oral aperture and then expelled through a larger one, common to all the zooids in the system. Phytoplankton and other small organisms get trapped in mucus threads secreted by the endostyle.

This tunicate breeds in the spring and summer and broods its larvae in its atrial cavity.

The nudibranch, Hermissenda crassicornis, feeds on this tunicate.
