= Aplidium stellatum =

Scientific classification
- Kingdom: Animalia
- Phylum: Chordata
- Subphylum: Tunicata
- Class: Ascidiacea
- Order: Aplousobranchia
- Family: Polyclinidae
- Genus: Aplidium
- Species: A. stellatum

Binomial name
- Aplidium stellatum (Verrill, 1871)

Species of sea squirt

Aplidium stellatum, commonly known as the Atlantic sea pork, is a species of sea squirt in the family Polyclinidae. Colonies of the sea squirt often get stranded on beaches, confusing beachgoers with their appearance. The common name of the sea squirt comes from its appearance often being similar to salt pork in shape and color.

== Description ==
The Atlantic sea pork is a colonial tunicate that can be red, pink, orange, or white. Colonies form on substrates and attach with a wide basal surface. These colonies typically form as irregularly shaped mounds that are firm and hard to the touch. Within the colony, zooids are regularly spaced.

Individual zooids appear round, oval, or elongated within the colony and open up into depressions. Zooids grow up to about 15 mm long, with the thorax and abdomen being 3 to 5mm long and the posterior abdomen being about 10 mm long. The zooid's brachial siphon has six short, round lobes. Along each side of the thorax are about 15 thin longitudinal muscles. The brachial sac has 12 to 14 rows of stigmata of about 15 stigmata per half row.

== Distribution ==
The Atlantic sea pork is found across the Western Atlantic from the Gulf of Maine to the eastern side of the Gulf of Mexico.

== Biology ==
Similar to most other tunicates, the Atlantic sea pork uses acidity as a way to deter predation and epibiotas. The acidity of the Atlantic sea pork comes from within its tunic and can reach pH levels below 3.0.
