= Aplidium albicans =

Scientific classification
- Kingdom: Animalia
- Phylum: Chordata
- Subphylum: Tunicata
- Class: Ascidiacea
- Order: Aplousobranchia
- Family: Polyclinidae
- Genus: Aplidium
- Species: A. albicans

Binomial name
- Aplidium albicans (Milne Edwards, 1841)

Synonyms
- Amaroucium albicans Milne Edwards, 1841

Sea squirt, source of toxin aplidine

Aplidium albicans is a toxic sea squirt native to the Mediterranean Sea.

== Range ==
Native to the Mediterranean Sea. Population density is sparse in its native range.

== Toxins ==
A. albicans contains aplidine (aplidin, plitidepsin), found by Steiner et al 2015 and Borjan et al 2015 to be a cytotoxin (due to its apoptotic effect) and antiangiogenic. The toxin is structurally and functionally almost identical to toxins produced by the genus Tistrella of marine bacteria.

== Aquaculture ==
Aquaculture of A. albicans has not been economically feasible as of 2008.
