= John Mather =

John Mather may refer to:

== Authors and academics ==
- John Mather (academic) (before 1680–after 1748), English administrator at University of Oxford
- John Mather (artist) (1848–1916), Australian landscape painter and art teacher
- John Baxter Mather (1853–1940), Scottish-born newspaper proprietor, painter and art critic in South Australia
- John N. Mather (1942–2017), American mathematician at Princeton
- John C. Mather (born 1946), American Nobel Prize–winning astrophysicist and cosmologist

== Businessmen ==
- John Mather (businessman) (1827–1907), Canadian pioneer in milling
- John T. Mather (1854–1928), American industrialist and philanthropist

== Politicians ==
- John C. Mather (New York politician) (1813–1882), American state legislator and commissioner
- John Perkins Cushing Mather (1816–1891), American state legislator and judge in Connecticut
- John B. Mather (c.1845–1892), Canadian businessman and alderman in Winnipeg

== Others ==
- John Mather (cricketer) (1821–1870), English-born Australian first-class player for Victoria
- John Eugene Mather (1907–1966), American radio, film and TV actor, stage name Jack Mather

== See also ==
- John Mathers, Blue Paint Killer on 2002 List of CSI: Crime Scene Investigation characters#Adversaries
