= Mathers =

Mathers is an English surname and may refer to:

- Edward Peter Mathers (1850–1924), British journalist and newspaper proprietor
- Edward Powys Mathers (1892–1939), British translator and poet
- George Mathers, 1st Baron Mathers (1886–1965), Scottish politician
- "Helen Mathers", pen-name of English author Ellen Buckingham Mathews (1853–1920)
- Frank Mathers (1924–2005), Canadian hockey player and member of the Hockey Hall of Fame
- James Mathers (disambiguation)
- Jerry Mathers (born 1948), American actor
- Marshall Bruce Mathers III (born 1972), birth name of Eminem, American rapper, songwriter, producer, artist and actor
- Moina Mathers (1865–1928), artist and occultist, wife of Samuel Liddell MacGregor Mathers
- Mojo Mathers (born 1966), New Zealand politician
- Paul Mathers (born 1970), Scottish footballer and coach
- Peter Mathers (1931–2004), Australian author and playwright
- Richard Mathers (born 1983), English rugby league player
- Samuel Liddell MacGregor Mathers (1854–1918), English co-founder of the Hermetic Order of the Golden Dawn

== See also ==
- Mather (surname)
