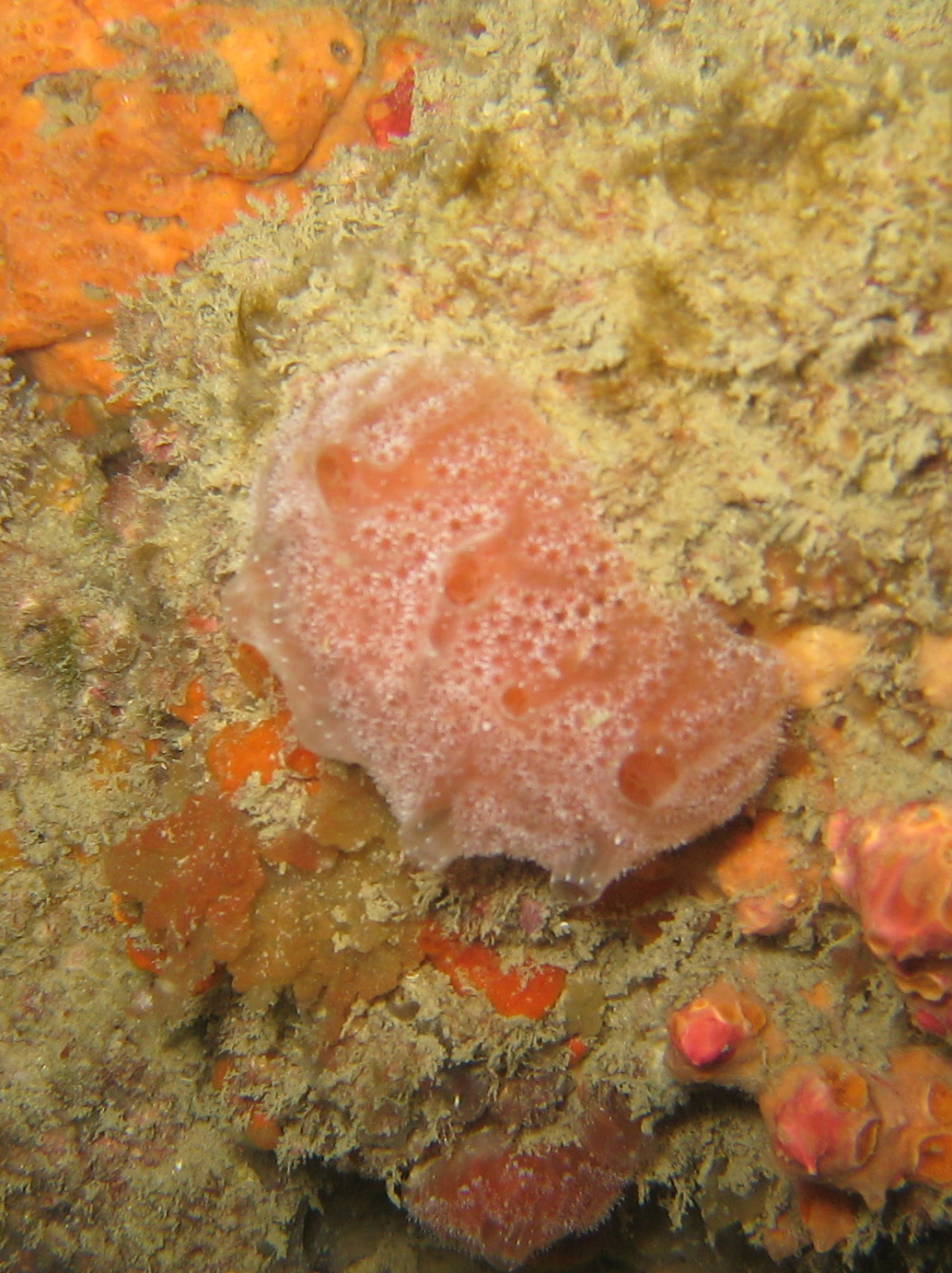

Scientific classification
- Kingdom: Animalia
- Phylum: Chordata
- Subphylum: Tunicata
- Class: Ascidiacea
- Order: Aplousobranchia
- Family: Polyclinidae
- Genus: Aplidium
- Species: A. elegans

Binomial name
- Aplidium elegans (Giard, 1872)

Synonyms
- Fragarium elegans Giard, 1872 (original combination); Fragaroides aurantiacum (Maurice, 1888); Parascidia elegans (Giard, 1872); Sidnyum elegans (Giard, 1872)

= Aplidium elegans =

Species of sea squirt

Aplidium elegans, the sea-strawberry, is a species of colonial sea squirt, a benthic tunicate in the family Polyclinidae and class Ascidiacea. It is native to shallow waters in the Atlantic Ocean and Mediterranean Sea. It is also found in between France and the United Kingdom.

== Description ==
Aplidium elegans form firm, flattened globular masses, that look like pink cushions from 3 to 4 cm long. The color is striking, with large white papillae around the inhalant siphons of the zooids and deep pink coloration of the colony. The arrangement of the zooids in the colony gives a meandering pattern, with cloacal canals between zooids. The zooids are embedded in a common test and grouped around sinuous, irregular cloacal canals. The oral siphons are slightly prominent and bordered of eight small white lobes. Colonial ascidians, like other benthic invertebrates show great morphological variability in terms of shape, size and color in response to both genetic characteristics and local environmental conditions.

== Distribution and habitat ==
Aplidium elegans is found in the Atlantic Ocean, Mediterranean Sea, and the English Channel. The colonies are found on rocks in waters 5 meters to 20 meters deep. Also can be found on moderately exposed rocky sites, usually with moderate tidal streams, attached to rocks. The colony is around 50mm broad and 15mm thick.

== Biology ==
Aplidium elegans colony is made up of a couple different parts. The zooid is the individual animal, and in a colony, there are multiple zooids. The colony has a test or tunica which is a thick layer secreted by the mantle, containing cellulose and protecting the animal. Every zooid has an oral siphon, which is an opening through which water is drawn into the ascidian to collect nutrients. Each individual also has a cloaca through which water is expelled.
