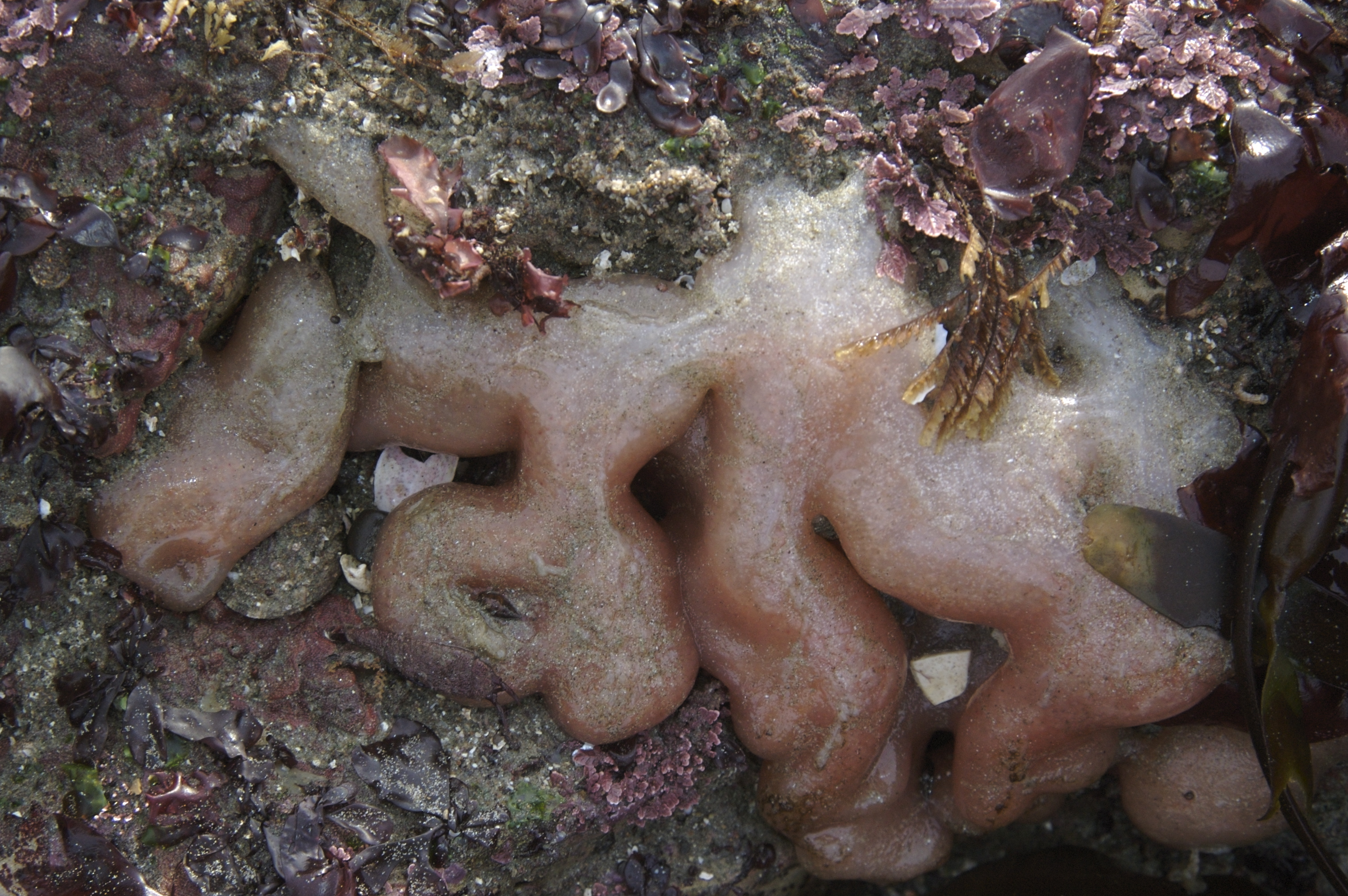
- Aplidium californicum

Scientific classification
- Kingdom: Animalia
- Phylum: Chordata
- Subphylum: Tunicata
- Class: Ascidiacea
- Order: Aplousobranchia
- Family: Polyclinidae
- Genus: Aplidium; Savigny, 1816

Species
- See text

Synonyms
- Alidium Oken, 1829; Alipidium Della Valle, 1882; Amaroucium Milne Edwards, 1841; Fragaroides Maurice, 1888; Macrenteron Redikorzev, 1927

= Aplidium =

Genus of tunicates

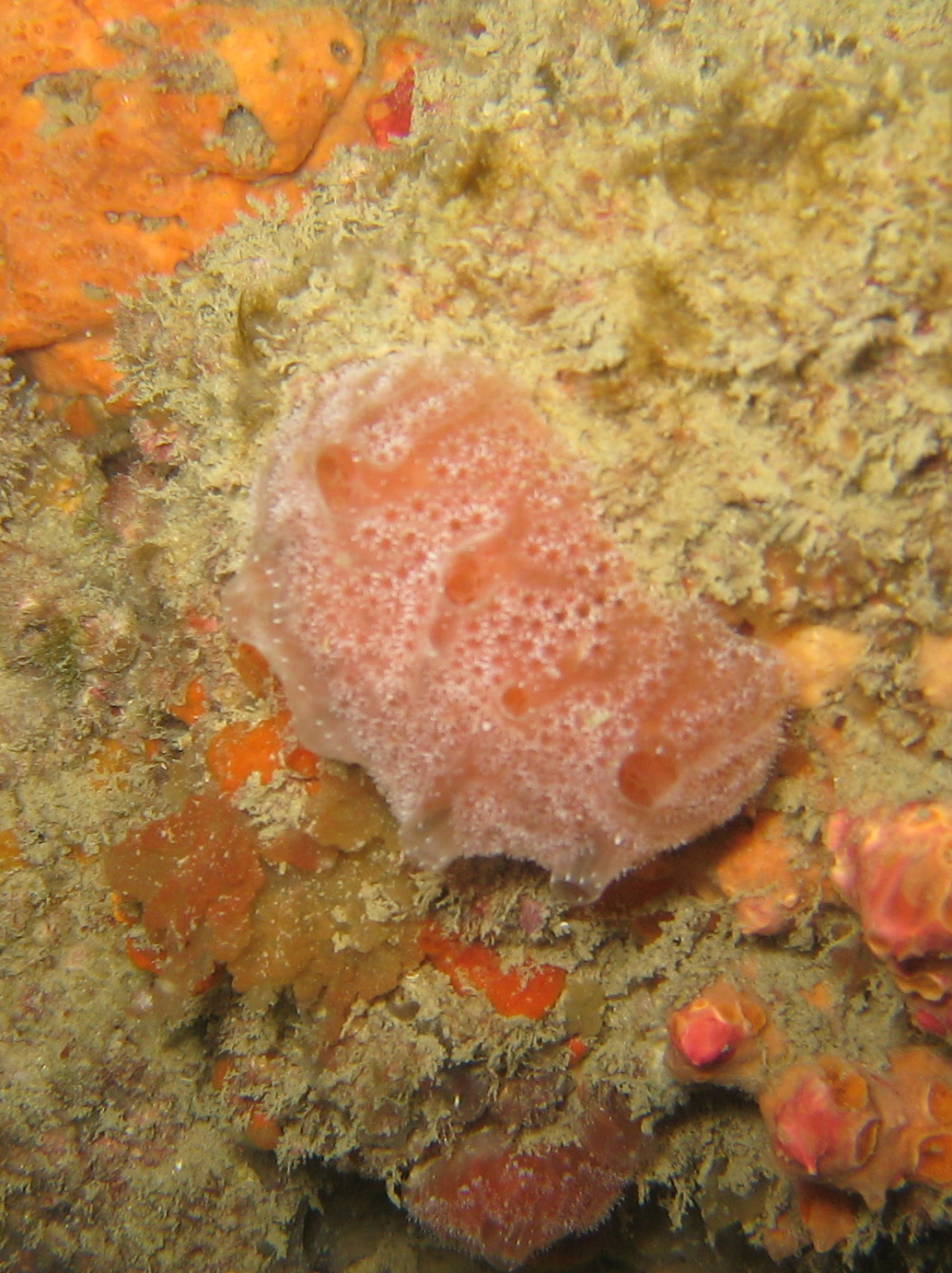
Aplidium elegans

Aplidium is a genus of colonial sea squirts, tunicates in the family Polyclinidae. There are about 188 species in the genus found in shallow waters around the world.

== Species ==
The following species are listed in this genus according to the World Register of Marine Species:

- Aplidium abditum Kott, 2006
- Aplidium abyssum Kott, 1969
- Aplidium accarense (Millar, 1953)
- Aplidium acropodium Monniot & Gaill, 1978
- Aplidium acroporum Kott, 1992
- Aplidium adamsi Brewin, 1946
- Aplidium aegeaensis (Hartmeyer, 1904)
- Aplidium agulhaense (Hartmeyer, 1912)
- Aplidium albicans (Milne-Edwards, 1841)
- Aplidium altarium (Sluiter, 1909)
- Aplidium amorphatum Kott, 1963
- Aplidium amphibolum Millar, 1982
- Aplidium annulatum Sluiter, 1906
- Aplidium antillense (Gravier, 1955)
- Aplidium appendiculatum (Michaelsen, 1923)
- Aplidium arenatum (Van Name, 1945)
- Aplidium areolatum (Delle Chiaje, 1828)
- Aplidium asperum Drasche, 1883
- Aplidium aurorae (Harant & Vernières, 1938)
- Aplidium australiense Kott, 1963
- Aplidium bacculum Kott, 1992
- Aplidium balleniae Monniot & Monniot, 1983
- Aplidium benhami (Brewin, 1946)
- Aplidium bermudae (Van Name, 1902)
- Aplidium bilinguae Monniot & Monniot, 1983
- Aplidium bilingula Monniot & Monniot, 2006
- Aplidium brementi (Harant, 1925)
- Aplidium brevilarvacium Kott, 1963
- Aplidium brevisiphonis Millar, 1964
- Aplidium breviventer Monniot & Monniot, 2001
- Aplidium broomeiensis Millar, 1963
- Aplidium caelestis Monniot, 1987
- Aplidium caeruleum (Sluiter, 1906)
- Aplidium californicum (Ritter & Forsyth, 1917)
- Aplidium cellis Monniot, 1987
- Aplidium cerebrum Monniot & Monniot, 2001
- Aplidium challengeri Brunetti, 2007
- Aplidium chthamalum Millar, 1982
- Aplidium circulatum (Hartmeyer, 1912)
- Aplidium circumvolutum (Sluiter, 1900)
- Aplidium claviforme Hartmeyer, 1912
- Aplidium clivosum Kott, 1992
- Aplidium coei (Ritter, 1901)
- Aplidium colelloides (Herdman, 1886)
- Aplidium colini Monniot & Monniot, 1999
- Aplidium confusum Sanamyan, 2000
- Aplidium congregatum Kott, 1992
- Aplidium conicum (Olivi, 1792)
- Aplidium coniferum Kott, 1963
- Aplidium constellatum (Verrill, 1871)
- Aplidium constrictum (Sluiter, 1900)
- Aplidium controversum Monniot & Monniot, 1996
- Aplidium convergens Monniot & Monniot, 2006
- Aplidium cottrelli (Brewin, 1957)
- Aplidium crateriferum (Sluiter, 1909)
- Aplidium crustatum Monniot, Monniot, Griffiths & Schleyer, 2001
- Aplidium crustum Kott, 2008
- Aplidium cunhense Millar, 1967
- Aplidium cyaneum Monniot & Monniot, 1983
- Aplidium cyclophorum Monniot & Monniot, 2001
- Aplidium dakarensis (Peres, 1948)
- Aplidium densum (Giard, 1872)
- Aplidium depressum Sluiter, 1909
- Aplidium diaphanum (Drasche, 1883)
- Aplidium didemniformis Monniot & Gaill, 1978
- Aplidium directum Kott, 1973
- Aplidium disiphonium (Beniaminson, 1975)
- Aplidium distaplium Kott, 1992
- Aplidium draschei Brunetti, 2007
- Aplidium dubium (Ritter, 1899)
- Aplidium effrenatum (Herdman, 1886)
- Aplidium elatum Kott, 1972
- Aplidium elegans (Giard, 1872)
- Aplidium enigmaticum Monniot C. & Monniot F., 1973
- Aplidium erythraeum (Michaelsen, 1919)
- Aplidium eudistomum Kott, 2008
- Aplidium exiguum (Herdman, 1886)
- Aplidium exile (Van Name, 1902)
- Aplidium falklandicum Millar, 1960
- Aplidium fistulosum Monniot & Monniot, 1991
- Aplidium flavolineatum (Sluiter, 1898)
- Aplidium fluorescum Kott, 1992
- Aplidium foliaceum (Sluiter, 1900)
- Aplidium formosum Kott, 2006
- Aplidium fragile (Redikorzev, 1927)
- Aplidium fuegiense (Cunningham, 1871)
- Aplidium fumigatum Herdman, 1886
- Aplidium funginum (Sluiter, 1898)
- Aplidium galeritum (Hartmeyer, 1912)
- Aplidium gastrolineatum Kott, 1992
- Aplidium gelasinum Kott, 1992
- Aplidium gelatinosum (Medioni, 1970)
- Aplidium geminatum Kott, 1992
- Aplidium gibbulosum (Savigny, 1816)
- Aplidium gilvum Millar, 1982
- Aplidium glabrum (Verrill, 1871)
- Aplidium glaphyrum Millar, 1982
- Aplidium globosum (Herdman, 1886)
- Aplidium gracile Monniot & Monniot, 1983
- Aplidium griseum Kott, 1992
- Aplidium grisiatum Kott, 1998
- Aplidium haesitans Monniot, Monniot, Griffiths & Schleyer, 2001
- Aplidium haouarianum (Pérès, 1956)
- Aplidium herdmani Brunetti, 2007
- Aplidium hians (Monniot & Gaill, 1978)
- Aplidium hortulus Brunetti, 2007
- Aplidium hyacinthum Kott, 2008
- Aplidium hyalinum (Pérès, 1956)
- Aplidium imbutum Monniot & Monniot, 1983
- Aplidium incubatum Kott, 1992
- Aplidium indicum (Renganathan & Monniot, 1984)
- Aplidium inflorescens Kott, 1992
- Aplidium intextum Monniot & Monniot, 2001
- Aplidium inversum (Pérès, 1959)
- Aplidium irregulare (Herdman, 1886)
- Aplidium jacksoni Kott, 1963
- Aplidium japonicum (Tokioka, 1949)
- Aplidium knoxi (Brewin, 1956)
- Aplidium kottae Brunetti, 2007
- Aplidium kurilense (Beniaminson, 1974)
- Aplidium laevigatum (Herdman, 1886)
- Aplidium laticum Kott, 2006
- Aplidium lebedi Sanamyan, 1998
- Aplidium lenticulum Kott, 1992
- Aplidium lineatum Monniot & Monniot, 1996
- Aplidium litum Monniot & Monniot, 2006
- Aplidium lobatum Savigny, 1816
- Aplidium lodix Kott, 1992
- Aplidium longithorax Monniot, 1987
- Aplidium longum Monniot, 1970
- Aplidium loricatum (Harant & Vernières, 1938)
- Aplidium lubricum (Sluiter, 1898)
- Aplidium lunacratum Kott, 1992
- Aplidium macrolobatum Kott, 1992
- Aplidium magellanicum Sanamyan & Schories, 2003
- Aplidium magnilarvum Kott, 1992
- Aplidium marchei (Monniot, 1969)
- Aplidium maritimum (Brewin, 1958)
- Aplidium maroccanum (Sluiter, 1927)
- Aplidium maru Monniot & Monniot, 1987
- Aplidium mauritaniae Sluiter, 1915
- Aplidium mediterraneum (Hartmeyer, 1909)
- Aplidium meridianum (Sluiter, 1906)
- Aplidium mernooensis (Brewin, 1956)
- Aplidium millari Monniot & Monniot, 1994
- Aplidium minisculum Kott, 1992
- Aplidium miripartum Monniot & Monniot, 1983
- Aplidium monile Monniot, Monniot, Griffiths & Schleyer, 2001
- Aplidium monoophorum Millar, 1975
- Aplidium monotonicum (Tokioka, 1954)
- Aplidium multilineatum Kott, 1992
- Aplidium multipapillatum Millar, 1975
- Aplidium multiplicatum Sluiter, 1909
- Aplidium multisulcatum Millar, 1977
- Aplidium mutabile (Sars, 1851)
- Aplidium nadaense (Nishikawa, 1980)
- Aplidium nema Monniot F. & Monniot C., 1976
- Aplidium nordmanni (Milne-Edwards, 1841)
- Aplidium nottii (Brewin, 1951)
- Aplidium novaezealandiae Brewin, 1952
- Aplidium oamaruensis (Brewin, 1950)
- Aplidium ocellatum Monniot C. & Monniot F., 1987
- Aplidium opacum Kott, 1963
- Aplidium ordinatum (Sluiter, 1906)
- Aplidium ornatum Kott, 1992
- Aplidium orthium Millar, 1982
- Aplidium ovum Monniot & Gaill, 1978
- Aplidium paessleri (Michaelsen, 1907)
- Aplidium pallidum (Verrill, 1871)
- Aplidium panis Kott, 2008
- Aplidium pantherinum (Sluiter, 1898)
- Aplidium paralineatum Kott, 1992
- Aplidium parastigmaticum Kott, 1992
- Aplidium parvum Kott, 1963
- Aplidium patriciae Brunetti, 2007
- Aplidium pellucidum (Leidy, 1855)
- Aplidium pentatrema (Monniot, 1972)
- Aplidium pererratum (Sluiter, 1912)
- Aplidium peresi Monniot, 1970
- Aplidium peruvianum Sanamyan & Schories, 2004
- Aplidium petrense Michaelsen, 1916
- Aplidium petrosum Kott, 1992
- Aplidium phortax (Michaelsen, 1924)
- Aplidium pictum Monniot & Monniot, 2001
- Aplidium pliciferum (Redikorzev, 1927)
- Aplidium polarsterni Tatian, Antacli & Sahade, 2005
- Aplidium polybunum (Redikorzev, 1927)
- Aplidium polyglossum Redikorzev, 1930
- Aplidium polytrema (Monniot C. & Monniot F., 1983)
- Aplidium powelli (Brewin, 1958)
- Aplidium profundum (Sluiter, 1909)
- Aplidium proliferum (Milne-Edwards, 1841)
- Aplidium pronum Kott, 1975
- Aplidium propinquum (Van Name, 1945)
- Aplidium protectans (Herdman, 1899)
- Aplidium pseudolobatum (Pérès, 1956)
- Aplidium pseudoradiatum Millar, 1982
- Aplidium punctum (Giard, 1873)
- Aplidium pusillum Monniot & Monniot, 1991
- Aplidium quadrisulcatum Millar, 1960
- Aplidium quadriversum Millar, 1982
- Aplidium quinquesulcatum Millar, 1977
- Aplidium radiatum (Sluiter, 1906)
- Aplidium radicosum (Monniot C. & Monniot F., 1979)
- Aplidium recumbens (Herdman, 1886)
- Aplidium retiforme (Herdman)
- Aplidium rhabdocormi Nishikawa, 1990
- Aplidium ritteri (Sluiter, 1895)
- Aplidium robustum Kott, 1992
- Aplidium rosaceum Monniot & Monniot, 2001
- Aplidium rosarium Kott, 1992
- Aplidium rubricollum Kott, 1963
- Aplidium rubripunctum Monniot & Monniot, 1997
- Aplidium rubrum (Tokioka, 1962)
- Aplidium ruzickai Sanamyan & Gleason, 2009
- Aplidium sacciferum Monniot & Monniot, 2001
- Aplidium sagamiense (Tokioka, 1967)
- Aplidium sagresensis Ramos-Espla, Turon & Vazquez, 1993
- Aplidium sarasinorum (Fiedler)
- Aplidium scabellum (Michaelsen, 1924)
- Aplidium schaudinni Hartmeyer, 1903
- Aplidium schultzei Hartmeyer, 1913
- Aplidium scyphus Monniot & Monniot, 1991
- Aplidium seeligeri Millar, 1960
- Aplidium siderum Monniot & Monniot, 1983
- Aplidium siphonum (Brewin, 1956)
- Aplidium soldatovi (Redikorzev, 1937)
- Aplidium solidum (Ritter & Forsyth, 1917)
- Aplidium solum Monniot & Monniot, 1974
- Aplidium spauldingi (Ritter, 1907)
- Aplidium spitzbergense Hartmeyer, 1903
- Aplidium spongiforme (Herdman, 1886)
- Aplidium stanleyi Millar, 1960
- Aplidium stellatum (Verrill, 1871)
- Aplidium stelliferum (Sluiter, 1900)
- Aplidium tabachniki Sanamyan & Sanamyan, 1999
- Aplidium tabarquensis Ramos-Espla, 1991
- Aplidium tabascum Kott, 1992
- Aplidium takii (Tokioka, 1959)
- Aplidium tasmaniensis Sanamyan & Sanamyan, 1999
- Aplidium tenuicaudum (Beniaminson, 1974)
- Aplidium thomasi Brewin, 1948
- Aplidium thomsoni Brewin, 1946
- Aplidium translucidum (Ritter, 1901)
- Aplidium traustedti Millar, 1977
- Aplidium tridentatum (Daumézon, 1909)
- Aplidium triggsense Kott, 1963
- Aplidium tuberosum Kott, 2008
- Aplidium turbinatum (Savigny, 1816)
- Aplidium undulatum Monniot & Gaill, 1978
- Aplidium unicornum Millar, 1982
- Aplidium uouo Monniot & Monniot, 1987
- Aplidium urgorrii Vazquez, 1994
- Aplidium uteute Monniot & Monniot, 1987
- Aplidium vanhoeffeni Hartmeyer, 1911
- Aplidium variabile (Herdman, 1886)
- Aplidium vastum (Sluiter, 1912)
- Aplidium vemense Millar, 1968
- Aplidium vexillum Monniot & Gaill, 1978
- Aplidium violaceum (Hartmeyer, 1912)
- Aplidium vulcanium Monniot & Monniot, 2001
- Aplidium wroomeiensis Millar, 1963
- Aplidium yamazii (Tokioka, 1949)
- Aplidium yezoense Tokioka, 1967
