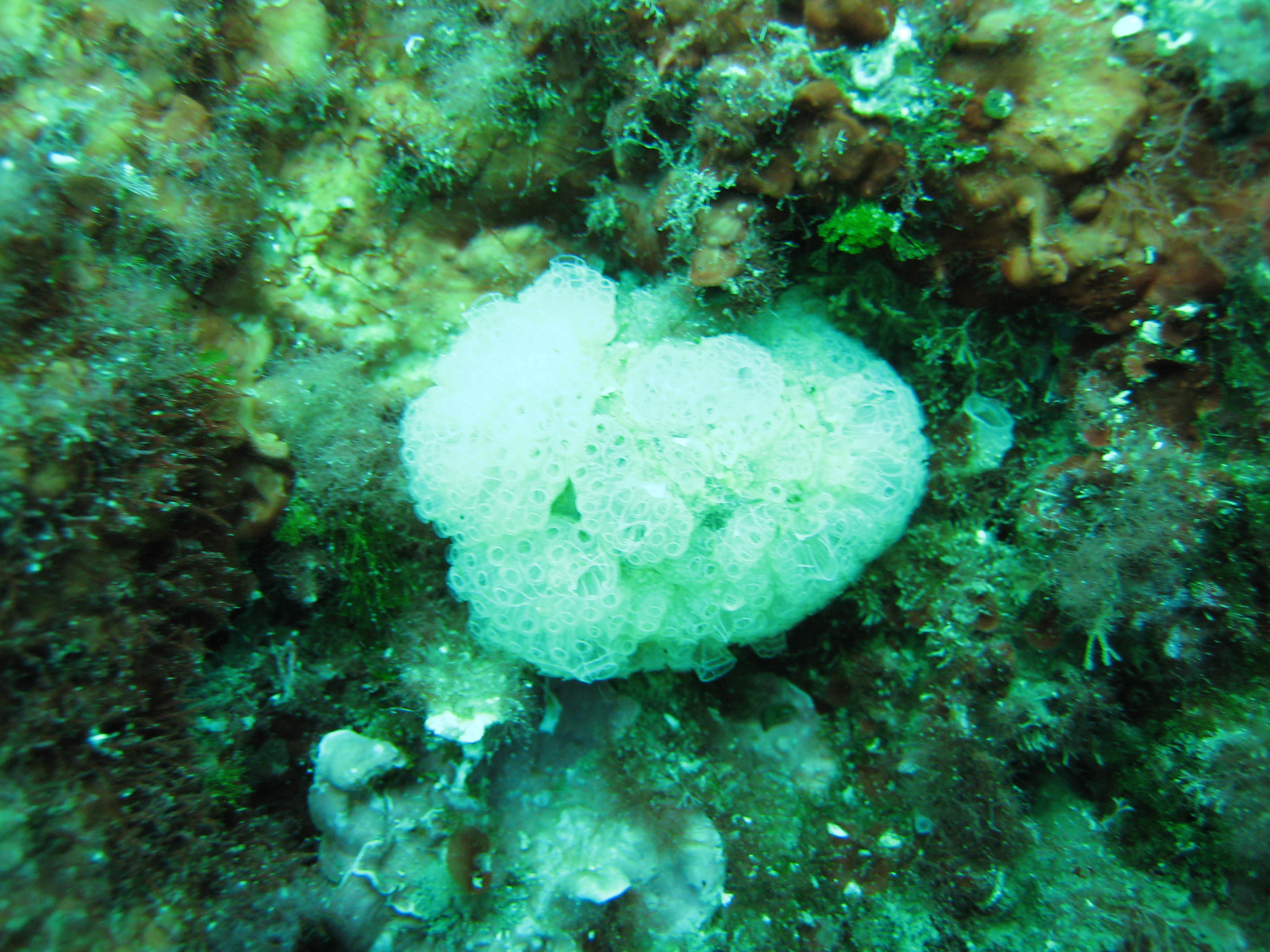
- Polyclinum aurantium

Scientific classification
- Kingdom: Animalia
- Phylum: Chordata
- Subphylum: Tunicata
- Class: Ascidiacea
- Order: Aplousobranchia
- Family: Polyclinidae
- Genus: Polyclinum
- Species: P. aurantium

Binomial name
- Polyclinum aurantium Milne-Edwards, 1841

Synonyms
- Glossophorum sabulosum (Giard, 1872); Polyclinum cerebriforme Alder & Hancock, 1912; Polyclinum sabulosum Giard, 1872

= Polyclinum aurantium =

Species of sea squirt

Polyclinum aurantium is a species of colonial sea squirt, a tunicate in the family Polyclinidae. It is native to shallow water in the northeastern Atlantic Ocean and Mediterranean Sea.

== Description ==
Polyclinum aurantium forms globular or flat-topped mounds consisting of a number of zooids immersed in a common tunic. Each zooid has its own buccal siphon with six lobes, through which it draws in water, and the colony has a small number of common cloacal siphons, each with a long tongue-like projection, through which water is expelled. The individual zooids are up to 6 mm (0.24 in) long, and the colony is yellowish-brown or yellowish-grey and often coated with sand.

== Distribution and habitat ==
Polyclinum aurantium is native to the northeastern Atlantic Ocean. Its range extends from Norway southwards to the Mediterranean Sea. It occurs on rocks and other hard substrates at depths down to about 100 m (328 ft).
