= David John Weston =

British flying ace

- Born: 14 November 1898; Wandsworth, London, England
- Died: Unknown
- Military career
- Allegiance: England
- Branch: Royal Air Force
- Rank: Lieutenant
- Unit: No. 20 Squadron RAF
- Awards: Distinguished Flying Cross

Lieutenant David John Weston DFC (born 14 November 1898, date of death unknown) was a British World War I flying ace credited with thirteen aerial victories. All of his wins were over enemy fighter planes.

== Military service ==
Weston was commissioned 12 August 1917. He joined 20 Squadron at about the same time, late 1917. Weston scored his victories with either one of two observer aces—Walter Noble or Ernest Deighton—manning the guns in the rear seat. Weston and Noble scored a double victory on 25 January 1918 to begin both their victory rolls. Weston later scored triple victories on 19 May 1918, with Deighton, and 30 June, again with Noble; his last triumph was on 2 July, when he destroyed a Fokker D.VII over the Gheluvelt-Menen Road. His final tally showed that he had shot down six uncontrollably and destroyed seven enemy fighter aircraft. For his actions, he received the Distinguished Flying Cross, which was announced on 3 August 1918.

== Honours and awards ==
Distinguished Flying Cross (DFC)

Lt. David John Weston.

A bold and skilful airman, who has accounted for six enemy machines.

He has been generally engaged against superior numbers and always with success.
