= Mather Hospital =

- Northwell Health
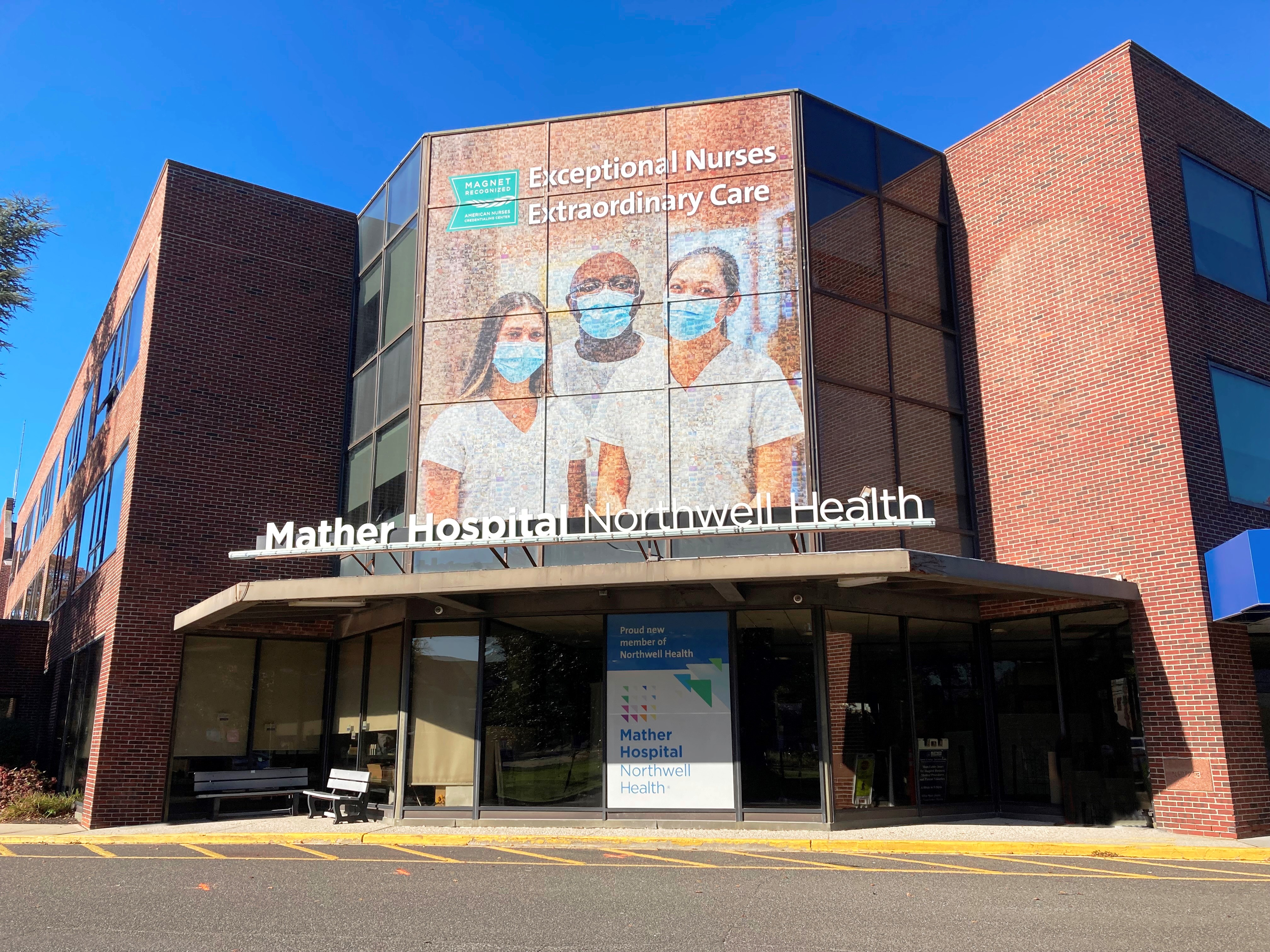

Geography
- Location: Port Jefferson, New York, United States
- Coordinates: 40°56′20.6″N 73°3′15.7″W

Services
- Emergency department: Yes
- Beds: 249

Helipads
- Helipad: (FAA LID: NK67)
Number	Length		Surface
Number	ft	m	Surface
H1	43x43	13x13	concrete/turf

History
- Former name: John T. Mather Memorial Hospital
- Constructed: 1928
- Opened: 1929

Links
- Website: www.matherhospital.org
- Lists: Hospitals in New York State

Mather Hospital (formerly known as John T. Mather Memorial Hospital) is a general teaching hospital operated by Northwell Health, located in Port Jefferson, New York. It is named after John T. Mather (1854–1928), who, in 1916, made provisions to his will to create the hospital.

== Description ==
John T. Mather Memorial Hospital opened on December 29, 1929. It initially had 54 beds. A new wing was added in 1962. It featured a new surgical suite, an emergency facility and an intensive care unit. A new psychiatric wing was added in 1973. In 1983, the hospital was renovated and another new wing was opened. In 1990, the hospital added the current emergency room called the Contessa Nadia Faber Emergency Pavilion. In 1992, the hospital opened the Frey Family Foundation Medical Arts Building, which currently houses the Bariatric Surgery Center of Excellence, Sleep Disorders Center, Infusion Center and administrative offices. By 1997, it reached its current bed count of 248. In 1998, the hospital opened the Matthew J. and Debra A. Cody Ambulatory and Inpatient Surgical Pavilion. In 2015, the Arthur & Linda Calace Family Pavilion was dedicated, housing a 35-single-bedded patient care unit; offices and teaching facilities for the Graduate Medical Education Program and a conference center.

Mather is a Magnet Recognized hospital (2013, 2018, 2022). In December 2017, Mather became affiliated with Northwell Health and its name was changed to Mather Hospital. In 2018 Mather Hospital was accredited by the American Nurses Credentialing Center for the first Graduate Nurse Transition to Practice residency program in New York State. The program was re-accredited with distinction in 2021.

The hospital offers bariatric surgery, orthopedic surgery, neurosurgery, pulmonology, robotic surgery, breast health, mental health and emergency services. Mather also operates Precision CyberKnife of New York in partnership with New York Cancer & Blood Specialists. The hospital cared for more than 10,000 inpatients and more than 36,800 emergency patients in 2021. Mather also has an outpatient Wound Care Treatment Center and a Hyperbaric Oxygen Therapy unit.

Mather Hospital has medical residency programs in internal medicine, transitional year, psychiatry, diagnostic radiology and integrated interventional radiology through The Donald and Barbara Zucker School of Medicine at Hofstra/Northwell along with fellowships in gastroenterology and hematology/oncology. The internal medicine program has received 93 percent+ Board pass rates. The hospital launched a Certified Nursing Assistant training program in 2022.

== See also ==
- Stony Brook University Hospital
- Saint Catherine of Siena Medical Center
