= Neodictyon =

Scientific classification
- Kingdom: Animalia
- Phylum: Chordata
- Subphylum: Tunicata
- Class: Ascidiacea
- Order: Aplousobranchia
- Family: Polyclinidae
- Genus: Neodictyon; Sanamyan, 1988
- Species: N. shumshu

Binomial name
- Neodictyon shumshu Sanamyan, 1998

Genus of sea squirts

Neodictyon is a genus of colonial sea squirts, tunicates in the family Polyclinidae. The only species is Neodictyon shumshu.
