= Minmi, New South Wales =

Minmi
- Suburb
- Interactive map of Minmi
- Coordinates: 32°52′55″S 151°37′05″E
- Country: Australia
- State: New South Wales
- City: Newcastle
- LGA: City of Newcastle
- Location: 19 km (12 mi) WNW of Newcastle

Government
  - State electorate: Wallsend
  - Federal division: Newcastle

Area
  - Total: 1.8 km^{2} (0.69 sq mi)

Population
  - Total: 700 (SAL 2021)
- Postcode: 2287
- Parish: Hexham

Minmi /ˈmɪnˌmaɪ/ is an outer western suburb of Newcastle, New South Wales, Australia, located 19 kilometres (12 mi) from Newcastle's central business district. It is part of the City of Newcastle local government area.

Minmi was an important coal mining centre in the second half of the nineteenth century, particularly under the ownership and management of J & A Brown.

Minmi's mines were connected by a private railway line across the Hexham Swamp to J & A Brown's loading facilities on the Hunter River at Hexham. J & A Brown's engineering workshops were also located at Hexham.

== History ==
=== Pre-European Colonisation ===
Prior to white settlement, the area of present-day Minmi was home to the Pambalong people for approximately 40,000 years. The Pambalong people were thought to be a sub-tribe of the Lake Macquarie Awabakal nation. Pambalong territory extended from the south bank of the Hunter River, west to Tarro and the foothills of the Sugarloaf Range and south to Lake Macquarie. By 1893 there was no trace of the Pambalong people in the Minmi district.

=== Timeline ===
The following information is largely taken from a sign in Minmi Park (see photo in image gallery below).

1835 – Coal discovered by Harry Styles.

1848 – First coal mines opened by William Robson and the Turner Brothers.

1850s – Coal mining by Eales and Brown Brothers.

1860s – J & A Brown acquire all land and mining rights in Minmi.

1861 – Public education begins. The first miners' union formed.

1877 – Back Creek tunnel opened. First Minmi race day.

1878 – New school opens with 300 students. Police station established.

1882 – John Brown – Manager of J & A Brown.

1884 – First soccer game in Newcastle – Minmi Rangers versus Lambton.

1890s – Progress Association established.

1895 – Post office and courthouse built.

1900s – Minmi's population at its height with 6,000 residents.

1909 – Maitland coal fields opened, prompting many Minmi mining families to leave for Cessnock and Kurri Kurri for the better pay offered at the Maitland coalfields.

1924 – John Brown closes Back Creek mines.

1929 – Coal strike and lockout.

1930 – John Brown dies.

1949 – Seven week strike. Army in open cut mine.

1951 – Open cut mining ceased. Back Creek despoiled.

1961 – Centenary of public education. New school opens.

1980 – Residents win land titles.

1990s – Minmi land rezoned. Bonnie Doon Estate established.

1992 – Freeway opened.

1995 – Fire station commissioned.

== Minmi Cemetery ==
Minmi Cemetery has a total of 598 graves; the oldest known grave is Eliza Chapman who died on 21 January 1863. Some graves could be older than that but are too deteriorated to read the inscription and many of the graves are without markers. The cemetery was originally established on the private property of J & A Brown, who operated a number of coal mines in the area, and was made available by them for public use. On 9 August 2002 the Minmi Heritage Garden was established next to the cemetery paid for by Coal & Allied.

== Notable people ==
- James Mathers (1894-1977), cricketer
- Robert Cameron (1890-1970), politician

== Image gallery ==
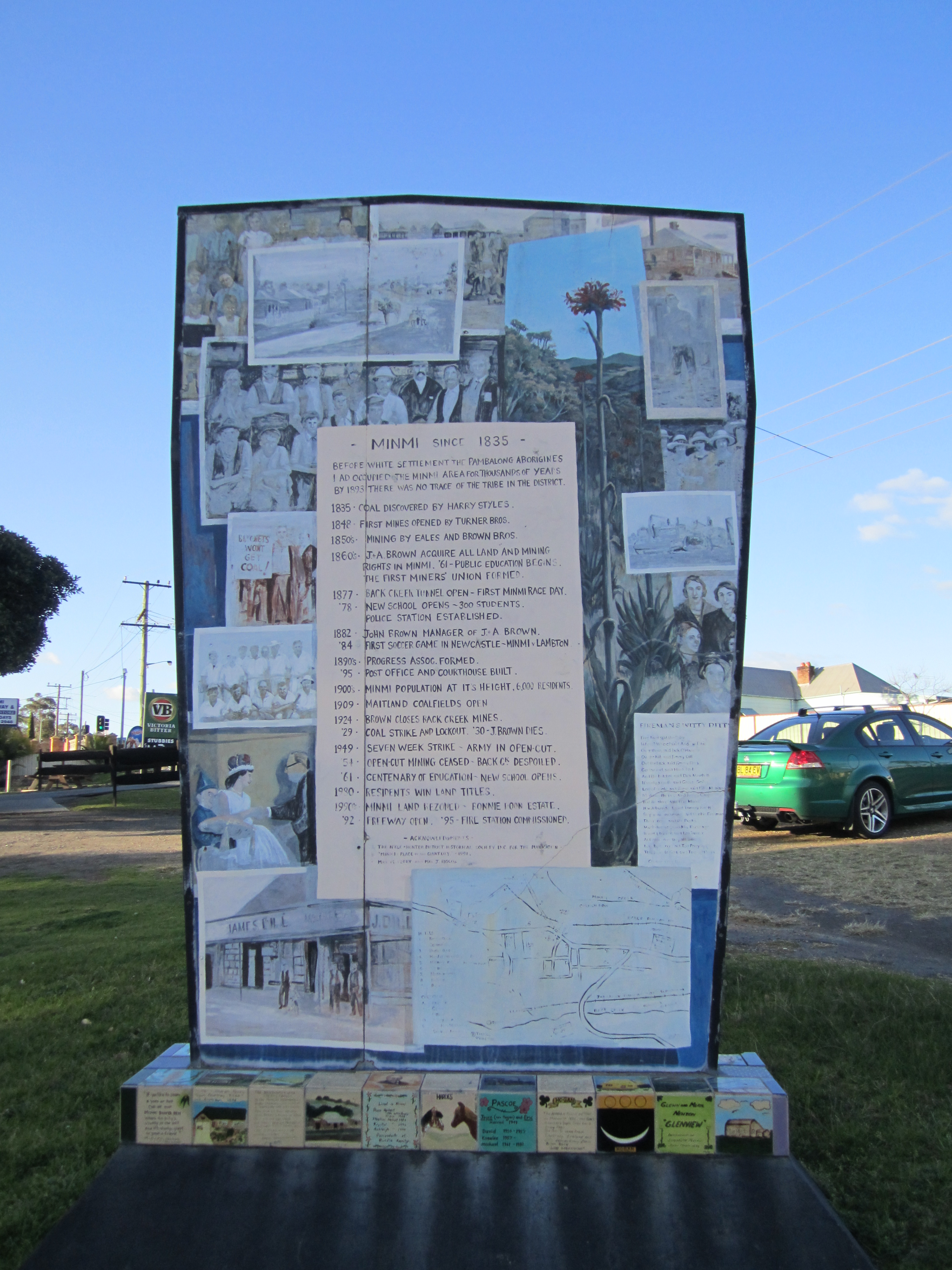
History sign

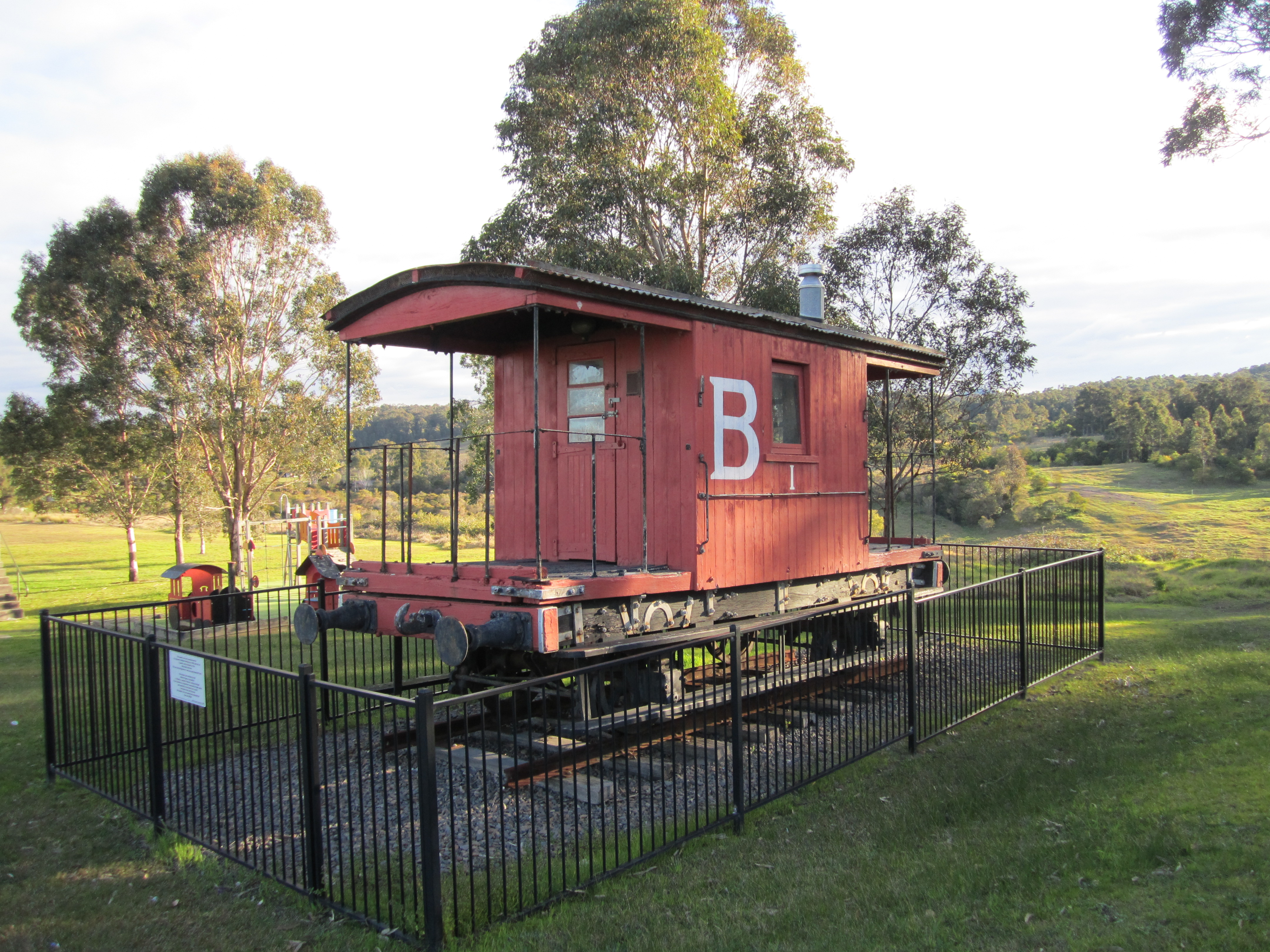
J & A Brown's brake wagon

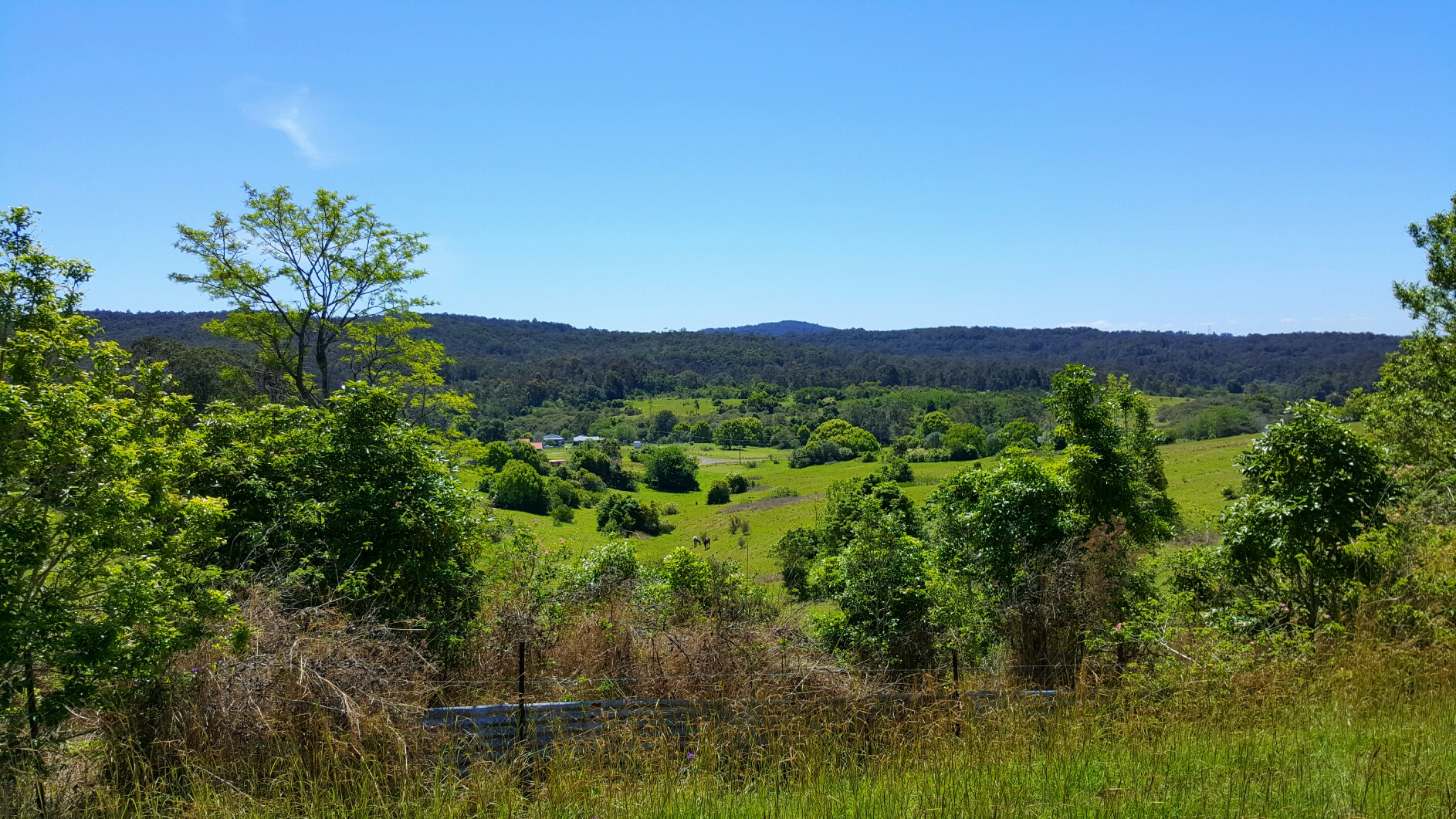
Minmi bushland

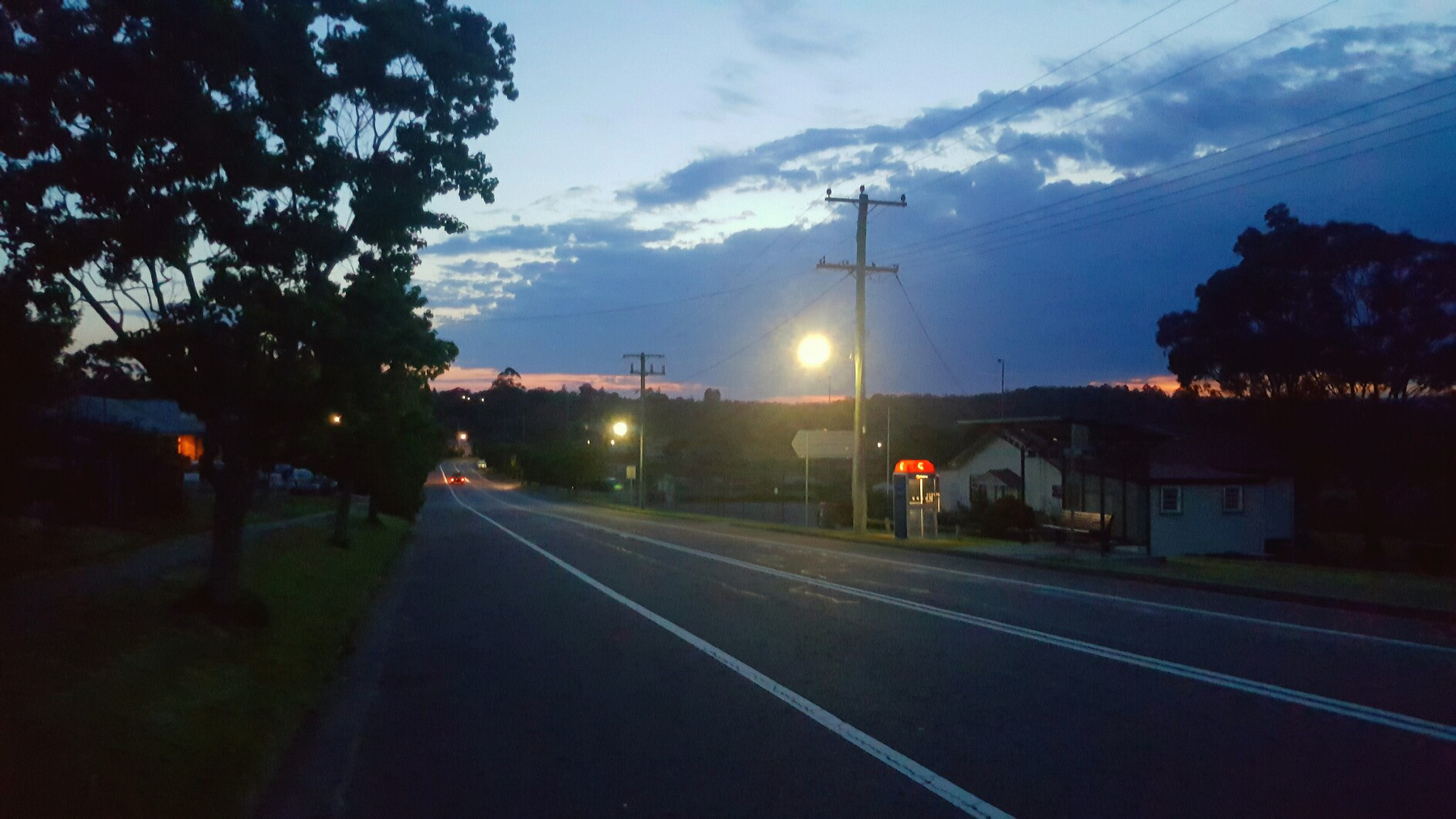
Woodford Street, Minmi
