= Aplidiopsis =

Scientific classification
- Kingdom: Animalia
- Phylum: Chordata
- Subphylum: Tunicata
- Class: Ascidiacea
- Order: Aplousobranchia
- Family: Polyclinidae
- Genus: Aplidiopsis; Lahille, 1890

Species
- See text

Genus of sea squirts

Aplidiopsis is a genus of colonial sea squirts, tunicates in the family Polyclinidae.

== Species ==
The World Register of Marine Species lists the following species:

- Aplidiopsis amoyense Tokioka, 1967
- Aplidiopsis atlanticus Monniot F., 1975
- Aplidiopsis chilensis Sanamyan, Schories & Sanamyan, 2010
- Aplidiopsis confluata Kott, 1992
- Aplidiopsis discoveryi Millar, 1960
- Aplidiopsis gelidus F. Monniot, 1987
- Aplidiopsis georgianum (Sluiter, 1932)
- Aplidiopsis helenae Redikorzev, 1927
- Aplidiopsis hospitale (Sluiter, 1909)
- Aplidiopsis indicus Monniot & Monniot, 2006
- Aplidiopsis mammillata Kott, 1992
- Aplidiopsis ocellatus Monniot & Monniot, 1996
- Aplidiopsis pannosum (Ritter, 1899)
- Aplidiopsis parvastigma Monniot & Monniot, 1991
- Aplidiopsis pyriformis (Herdman, 1886)
- Aplidiopsis sabulosa Kott, 1992
- Aplidiopsis stellatus Monniot & Monniot, 1984
- Aplidiopsis tokaraensis Tokioka, 1954
- Aplidiopsis tubiferus F. Monniot, 2001
- Aplidiopsis vitreum (Lahille, 1887)
