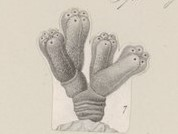
- Synoicum turgens

Scientific classification
- Kingdom: Animalia
- Phylum: Chordata
- Subphylum: Tunicata
- Class: Ascidiacea
- Order: Aplousobranchia
- Family: Polyclinidae
- Genus: Synoicum; Phipps, 1774

Species
- See text

= Synoicum =

Genus of sea squirts

Synoicum is a genus of colonial sea squirts, tunicates in the family Polyclinidae.

== Species ==
The following species are recognised in the genus Synoicum:

- Synoicum adareanum (Herdman, 1902)
- Synoicum angustum Kott, 1992
- Synoicum apectetum Millar, 1982
- Synoicum arenaceum (Michaelsen, 1924)
- Synoicum atlanticum Millar, 1968
- Synoicum atopogaster Kott, 1963
- Synoicum australe Millar, 1962
- Synoicum beauchampi (Harant, 1927)
- Synoicum blochmanni (Heiden, 1894)
- Synoicum bowerbanki Millar, 1963
- Synoicum buccinum Kott, 1992
- Synoicum calypsonis (Peres, 1956)
- Synoicum capense Millar, 1962
- Synoicum castellatum Kott, 1992
- Synoicum chrysanthemum Kott, 1992
- Synoicum citrum Kott, 1992
- Synoicum clavatum (Oka, 1927)
- Synoicum concavitum Kott, 1992
- Synoicum cymosum Redikorzev, 1927
- Synoicum daucum Monniot C. & Monniot F., 1977
- Synoicum derjugini Redikorzev, 1927
- Synoicum diaphanum Sluiter, 1927
- Synoicum duboscqui (Harant, 1927)
- Synoicum erectum Kott, 1992
- Synoicum floriferum Monniot & Monniot, 2006
- Synoicum galei (Michaelsen, 1930)
- Synoicum georgianum Sluiter, 1932
- Synoicum haurakiensis Brewin, 1951
- Synoicum herdmani Brewin, 1956
- Synoicum howeni Monniot & Monniot, 1988
- Synoicum hypurgon (Michaelsen, 1924)
- Synoicum implicatum Kott, 2008
- Synoicum incrustatum (Sars, 1851)
- Synoicum insulsum (Sluiter, 1898)
- Synoicum intercedens (Sluiter, 1909)
- Synoicum irregulare Ritter, 1899
- Synoicum jordani (Ritter, 1899)
- Synoicum kerguelenense (Hartmeyer, 1911)
- Synoicum kincaidi (Ritter, 1899)
- Synoicum kuranui Brewin, 1950
- Synoicum laboutei F. Monniot & C. Monniot, 2006
- Synoicum lacazei (Pérès, 1957)
- Synoicum longistriatum Kott, 1992
- Synoicum macroglossum (Hartmeyer, 1919)
- Synoicum molle (Herdman, 1886)
- Synoicum obscurum Kott, 1992
- Synoicum occidentalis Millar, 1982
- Synoicum ostentor Monniot & Monniot, 1983
- Synoicum otagoensis Millar, 1982
- Synoicum papilliferum (Michaelsen, 1930)
- Synoicum parfustis (Ritter & Forsyth, 1917)
- Synoicum partitionis Monniot, 1987
- Synoicum parvum Redikorzev, 1937
- Synoicum pellucens Redikorzev, 1927
- Synoicum pellucidum (Ritter & Forsyth, 1917)
- Synoicum pererratum (Sluiter, 1912)
- Synoicum polygyna C. Monniot & F. Monniot, 1980
- Synoicum pomum (Sars, 1851)
- Synoicum pribilovense (Ritter, 1899)
- Synoicum prunum (Herdman, 1899)
- Synoicum pseudogrisiatum Kott, 2008
- Synoicum pulmonaria (Ellis & Solander, 1786)
- Synoicum ramulosum Kott, 1969
- Synoicum rapum Kott, 2008
- Synoicum sabuliferum Redikorzev, 1937
- Synoicum sacculum Kott, 1992
- Synoicum sagamianum Tokioka, 1962
- Synoicum salivum Monniot & Gaill, 1978
- Synoicum saxeum Kott, 1998
- Synoicum senegalense (Peres, 1949)
- Synoicum solidum Redikorzev, 1937
- Synoicum sphinctorum Kott, 2006
- Synoicum stewartense (Michaelsen, 1924)
- Synoicum suarenum Kott, 1992
- Synoicum syrtis Kott, 2006
- Synoicum tentaculatum Kott, 1969
- Synoicum triplex (Sluiter, 1906)
- Synoicum tropicum (Sluiter, 1909)
- Synoicum turgens Phipps, 1774
- Synoicum vesica Kott, 2008
- Synoicum vibei Lützen, 1959
