= Polyclinella =

Scientific classification
- Kingdom: Animalia
- Phylum: Chordata
- Subphylum: Tunicata
- Class: Ascidiacea
- Order: Aplousobranchia
- Family: Polyclinidae
- Genus: Polyclinella; Harant, 1931
- Species: P. azemai

Binomial name
- Polyclinella azemai Harant, 1930

Genus of sea squirts

Polyclinella is a genus of colonial sea squirts, tunicates in the family Polyclinidae. The only species is Polyclinella azemai.
