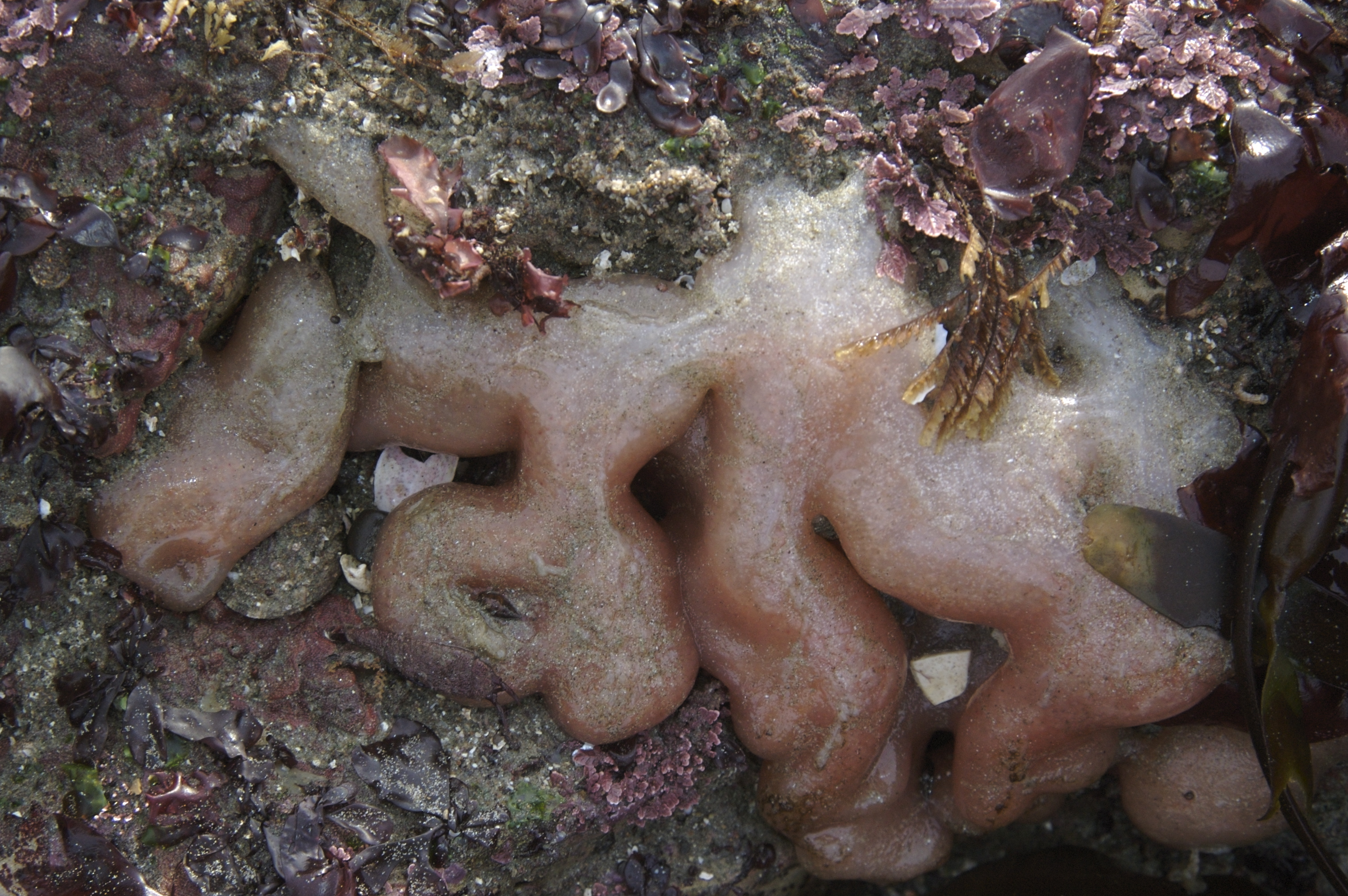
- Aplidium californicum

Scientific classification
- Kingdom: Animalia
- Phylum: Chordata
- Subphylum: Tunicata
- Class: Ascidiacea
- Order: Aplousobranchia
- Family: Polyclinidae
- Genus: Aplidium
- Species: A. californicum

Binomial name
- Aplidium californicum (Ritter & Forsyth, 1917)

Synonyms
- Amaroucium californicum Ritter & Forsyth, 1917

= Aplidium californicum =

Species of sea squirt

Aplidium californicum is a species of colonial sea squirt, a tunicate in the family Polyclinidae. It is commonly known as sea pork.

== Description ==
Aplidium californicum is a compound tunicate forming sheets, mounds or slabs on rocks and other hard substrates. The tunic is jelly-like in consistency, 1 to 3 cm thick and a shiny yellow, orange, reddish-brown or a translucent white colour. The individual zooids are brown or buff, 6 mm long and arranged in oval or elongate systems. Each one is subdivided into a thorax, an abdomen and a postabdomen. There are usually 10 to 12 rows of perforations.

== Distribution ==
Aplidium californicum is common on the west coast of North America from British Columbia south to Baja California, Mexico and the Galápagos Islands. It is found in the intertidal zone and at depths down to 85 metres.

== Biology ==
Aplidium californicum is a filter feeder. Water is sucked into the interior of the organism through a siphon and then expelled through another one. Phytoplankton and other small organisms get trapped in mucus threads secreted by the endostyle. The tunicate seems to form a symbiotic relationship with the bryozoan Bugula neritina.

Certain antineoplastic agents, bryostatins 4 and 5, have been extracted from Aplidium californicum and are being evaluated.
