= Wilfred Beaver =

British flying ace (1897–1986)

- Born: 10 May 1897; Kingswood, Bristol, Gloucestershire, England
- Died: 19 August 1986 (aged 89); West Point, Mississippi, USA
- Military career
- Allegiance: United Kingdom; United States of America
- Branch: Canadian Army; Royal Air Force; US Army Air Forces
- Service years: 1914–1917 (Canada); 1917–1919 (UK); 1942–1957 (USA)
- Rank: Captain (UK); Colonel (USA)
- Units: Canadian Field Artillery; No. 20 Squadron RAF; 447th Bombardment Group
- Conflicts: World War I World War II
- Awards: Military Cross (UK); Bronze Star (USA)

Captain Wilfred Beaver (10 May 1897 – 19 August 1986) was a British World War I flying ace credited with 19 aerial victories and American fighter pilot in World War II.

== Early life and Army service ==
After passing his childhood in his native England, Beaver sailed for Canada. His parents separated in 1911, and he was shipped off to Montreal, Canada. He was supposed to live with his uncle and study dentistry. He enlisted in the 1st Canadian Heavy Battery of the Canadian Expeditionary Force on 7 August 1914. He served with the Field Artillery for the next two and a half years, including duty in France.

== Aerial success ==
He transferred to the Royal Flying Corps on 28 February 1917. He trained at the RAF Training School at Oxford, England. He was posted to 20 Squadron to fly two-seater Bristol Fighters. He scored his first victory on 13 November 1917. On 6 January 1918, he became an ace. He continued collecting victories, with a double on 5 February 1918 and three wins on 27 May 1918. His final victory came on 13 June 1918. In the final analysis, Beaver and his observers (including fellow aces M. B. Mather and Ernest Deighton) were credited 11 enemy airplanes destroyed and eight driven down out of control.

== Between the wars ==
Beaver was transferred the unemployed list effective 13 April 1919. He returned to Canada, then emigrated to the United States on 23 April. He lived in Greenville, Mississippi in 1920. He became a naturalized citizen on 21 September 1926. His 1930 residence was Jamestown, New York.

== World War II and beyond ==
He returned to service in World War II as a major, and was the executive officer of the 447th Bombardment Group, 3rd Air Force, from 25 June 1943, and was awarded a Bronze Star. He was promoted to lieutenant colonel and moved up to command the group from 1 July 1945 through August. He then continued on active duty until 15 January 1946. He later served in the U.S. Air Force Reserve until 1957, retiring with the rank of colonel.

== Honours and awards ==
Military Cross
T./2nd Lt. Wilfred Beaver, Gen. List, and R.F.C.
For conspicuous gallantry and devotion to duty. During the last five months he has destroyed five hostile machines, and has brought down completely out of control six others. During the recent operations he has performed exceptionally good work in bombing and firing upon hostile troops from very low altitudes. He has displayed marked gallantry and resource, and has proved himself a patrol leader of great dash and ability.
