= Walter Noble =

- Born: 15 October 1884; Creeting St. Peter, Suffolk
- Died: Unknown
- Military career
- Allegiance: England
- Branch: Infantry; aviation
- Rank: Lieutenant
- Units: Essex Regiment, No. 20 Squadron RAF
- Awards: Distinguished Flying Cross

Lieutenant Walter Noble DFC was a World War I flying ace credited with twelve aerial victories.

== Early life ==
Walter Noble was originally from Stowmarket, Suffolk. He was a tea planter in India from 1911 through 1915. However, in January 1913, Noble was named co-executor in a will, and still gave his address as Stowmarket.

== World War I ==
Noble returned to England for the First World War. He originally served with the Essex Regiment, enlisting about 1916. He transferred to the Royal Flying Corps in September 1917. Noble scored his first two victories on 25 January 1918. Among his following victories, he won three times on 30 June 1918. He gained nine of his victories while manning the guns in the back seat of David John Weston and a couple of others as a gunner for Paul Iaccaci. On 2 July 1918, he finished his string with his twelfth victory. His final tally was five German fighter planes destroyed and seven driven down out of control.

== Honours and awards ==
Distinguished Flying Cross (DFC)

2nd Lt. Walter Noble (formerly Essex Regt.). A skilful and determined observer who has been most successful in destroying enemy machines, very often when in superior strength to his own formation.

== Publications ==
- With a Bristol Fighter Squadron. Walter Noble. Publisher A. Melrose, 1920. Reprinted by C.Chivers, 1977. ISBN 0-85997-230-5, ISBN 978-0-85997-230-7
