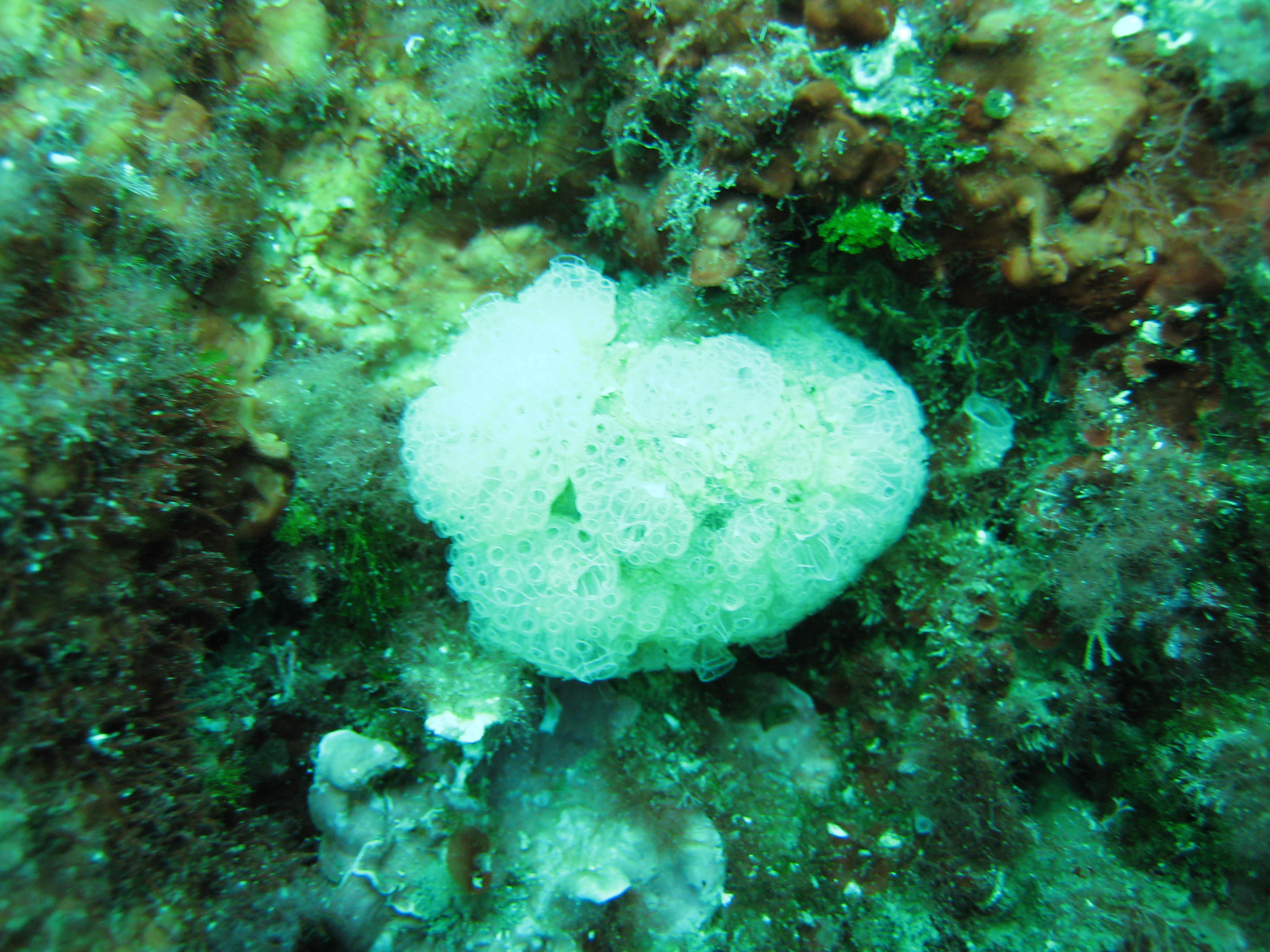
- Polyclinum aurantium

Scientific classification
- Kingdom: Animalia
- Phylum: Chordata
- Subphylum: Tunicata
- Class: Ascidiacea
- Order: Aplousobranchia
- Family: Polyclinidae
- Genus: Polyclinum; Savigny, 1816

Species
- See text

= Polyclinum =

Genus of sea squirts

Polyclinum is a genus of colonial sea squirts, tunicates in the family Polyclinidae.

== Species ==
The World Register of Marine Species lists the following species:

- Polyclinum arenosum (Sluiter, 1898)
- Polyclinum aurantium Milne Edwards, 1841
- Polyclinum cerebrale Michaelsen, 1924
- Polyclinum circulatum Jensen, 1980
- Polyclinum complanatum Herdman, 1899
- Polyclinum constellatum Savigny, 1816
- Polyclinum corbis Kott, 2003
- Polyclinum crater Sluiter, 1909
- Polyclinum festum Hartmeyer, 1905
- Polyclinum fungosum Herdman, 1886
- Polyclinum glabrum Sluiter, 1895
- Polyclinum hesperium Savigny, 1816
- Polyclinum hospitale Sluiter, 1909
- Polyclinum incrustatum Michaelsen, 1930
- Polyclinum indicum Sebastian, 1952
- Polyclinum isiacum Savigny, 1816
- Polyclinum isipingense Sluiter, 1898
- Polyclinum johnsoni Monniot & Monniot, 1989
- Polyclinum lagena Monniot & Monniot, 2006
- Polyclinum laxum Van Name, 1945
- Polyclinum macrophyllum Michaelsen, 1919
- Polyclinum maeandrium Sluiter, 1915
- Polyclinum marsupiale Kott, 1963
- Polyclinum meridianum Sluiter, 1900
- Polyclinum michaelseni Brewin, 1956
- Polyclinum molle Rocha & Costa, 2005
- Polyclinum neptunium Hartmeyer, 1912
- Polyclinum novaezelandiae Brewin, 1958
- Polyclinum nudum Kott, 1992
- Polyclinum orbitum Kott, 1992
- Polyclinum pedicellatum Monniot, 2012
- Polyclinum planum (Ritter & Forsyth, 1917)
- Polyclinum psammiferum Hartmeyer, 1911
- Polyclinum pute Monniot & Monniot, 1987
- Polyclinum reticulatum Sluiter, 1915
- Polyclinum sacceum Monniot & Monniot, 2006
- Polyclinum saturnium Savigny, 1816
- Polyclinum sebastiani Brunetti, 2007
- Polyclinum sibiricum Redikorzev, 1907
- Polyclinum sluiteri Brewin, 1956
- Polyclinum sundaicum (Sluiter, 1909)
- Polyclinum tenuatum Kott, 1992
- Polyclinum terranum Kott, 1992
- Polyclinum tingens Monniot, 2012
- Polyclinum tsutsuii Tokioka, 1954
- Polyclinum vasculosum Pizon, 1908
