= James Mathers =

James Mathers may refer to:

- James Mathers (Sergeant at Arms), Sergeant at Arms of the United States Senate
- James Mathers (cricketer) (1894–1977), Australian cricketer
- James Mathers (missionary) (1854–1911), Irish-born missionary in Australia
- Jim Mathers (born 1955), American cinematographer and director of photography
