= Ernest Deighton =

English World War I observer/gunner flying ace

Ernest Arthur Deighton
- Born: 28 May 1889; Masham, Yorkshire, England
- Died: 5 December 1957 (aged 68); Bournemouth, Hampshire, England
- Military career
- Allegiance: United Kingdom
- Branch: Royal Air Force; British Territorial Army Reserve
- Service years: 1917–1918; 1942–1945
- Rank: Sergeant
- Units: No. 20 Squadron RAF; Army Cadet Force
- Conflicts: World War I World War II
- Awards: Distinguished Conduct Medal

Sergeant Ernest Arthur Deighton DCM (28 May 1889 – 5 December 1957) was an English World War I observer/gunner flying ace credited with 15 confirmed aerial victories; all but one of them was against enemy fighters.

== Military career ==
=== World War I ===
Deighton enlisted in the Royal Flying Corps on 15 March 1917 as a transport driver. As a corporal mechanic, he volunteered to fly as an observer/gunner in the rear seat of No. 20 Squadron's Bristol F.2 Fighters.

Deighton flew as an observer/gunner for four pilot aces: Captain Wilfred Beaver, Lieutenants David Weston, Leslie Capel, and Ernest Lindup. Deighton scored his first victory on 11 April 1918 and closed out his string on 23 June 1918. In total, he was credited with destroying ten enemy fighters and an observation plane, and with four other German fighters claimed 'out of control'.

Deighton was awarded the Distinguished Conduct Medal on 7 June 1918. He and Beaver were forced down by a German Albatros D.V on 13 June 1918, but were uninjured. However, Deighton was subsequently injured on 15 July 1918 and returned to Britain.

Deighton's Distinguished Conduct Medal was gazetted to him on 1 October 1918. The award citation read:

67051 Corporal (Acting-Serjeant) E. A. Deighton, Royal Air Force. (Cheltenham).
For conspicuous gallantry and devotion to duty. In little more than a fortnight he has shot down five enemy aircraft. He has shown remarkable marksmanship and coolness in action, and is a valuable asset in his squadron.

Unusually, the original award recommendations still exist. One of them was written on 27 May 1918; Captain Beaver followed up with a second one two days later. Both give more detailed accounts of Deighton's exploits than the award citation, mainly enumerating his aerial victories.

=== World War II ===
Deighton returned to service during World War II, being commissioned as a second lieutenant in the Warwickshire Army Cadet Force on 25 November 1942. He finally resigned his commission on 12 May 1945 as a Lieutenant Colonel.

After the War Deighton and his wife, Eva, became hoteliers initially in Newquay, then in Bournemouth at Dean Park Lodge, which became his home for the rest of his life. Here, he was affectionately known by staff and guests as “Colonel”.

== Bibliography ==
- Franks, Norman; Guest, Russell F. & Alegi, Gregory (1997). Above the War Fronts: The British Two-seater Bomber Pilot and Observer Aces, the British Two-seater Fighter Observer Aces, and the Belgian, Italian, Austro-Hungarian and Russian Fighter Aces, 1914–1918. London, UK: Grub Street. ISBN 978-1-898697-56-5.
- Guttman, Jon & Dempsey, Harry (2007). Bristol F2 Fighter Aces of World War I. Osprey Publishing. ISBN 978-1-84603-201-1.
