= Ernest Lindup =

South African World War I flying ace

- Born: Unknown
- Died: Unknown
- Military career
- Allegiance: United Kingdom
- Rank: Lieutenant
- Unit: No. 20 Squadron RAF
- Conflicts: World War I
- Awards: Military Cross

Lieutenant Ernest Lindup MC was a South African World War I flying ace credited with five aerial victories.

Lindup scored five victories between 4 February and 31 May 1918 while flying a Bristol F.2 Fighter. His observer gunners included fellow aces M. B. Mather, Ernest Deighton, and Henry Crowe.
