= Sidneioides =

Scientific classification
- Kingdom: Animalia
- Phylum: Chordata
- Subphylum: Tunicata
- Class: Ascidiacea
- Order: Aplousobranchia
- Family: Polyclinidae
- Genus: Sidneioides; Kesteven, 1909

Species
- See text

Genus of sea squirts

Sidneioides is a genus of colonial sea squirts, tunicates in the family Polyclinidae.

== Species ==
The World Register of Marine Species lists the following species:

- Sidneioides ivicense Pérès, 1957
- Sidneioides japonense Redikorzev, 1913
- Sidneioides peregrinus Kremer et al., 2011
- Sidneioides snamoti (Oka, 1927)
- Sidneioides tamaramae Kesteven, 1909
