= John T. Mather =

American businessman and philanthropist

- Born: June 27, 1854; Port Jefferson, New York.
- Died: March 30, 1928 (aged 73); Habana, Cuba
- Occupations: Businessman, philanthropist

John Titus Mather (1854-1928) was an American businessman and philanthropist. He was born in Port Jefferson, New York, on June 27, 1854, and died in Habana, Cuba, on March 30, 1928. The descendant of a shipbuilding family, he spent most of his active life in that industry. The annals of shipbuilding in the Port Jefferson vicinity are closely related to John T. Mather and his blood predecessors.

== Career ==
Mather's great grandfather was Captain John Wilsie, who built a sailing vessel in Port Jefferson as early as 1797. This was the beginning of the Mather ship building business. Under the direction of his father, John R. Mather, the business specialized in building large sailing vessels. After John R. Mather’s death, the firm built the Martha E. Wallace, the last large sailing vessel built in Port Jefferson.

John T. Mather had other large businesses related to shipping. During World War I, Mather disposed of his holdings and retired from active business life. For many years prior to his death, he made careful study of how best to use the proceeds of his success to the benefit of those less fortunate. As early as 1916, Mather had made provisions in his will for setting aside a substantial sum to erect and maintain a non-sectarian charitable hospital – to give people the advantage of the best in hospital facilities at a reasonable cost. Built according to his wishes, John T. Mather Memorial Hospital opened its doors on December 29, 1929 and serves the community to this day. It is located at 75 North Country Rd., Port Jefferson

Mather did not marry, devoting his life chiefly to business and philanthropic projects.

The Mather House Museum, located at 115 Prospect Street, Port Jefferson, was the home of the Mather family. The museum displays many authentic shipbuilding tools, original ship attachments and furniture settings of the period.

== John T. Mather Memorial Hospital ==
John T. Mather Memorial Hospital is a 248-bed community teaching hospital. It is home to an Emergency Pavilion, a state-of-the-art Ambulatory and Inpatient Surgical Pavilion and a Medical Office Building, all on a 35-acre (140,000 m^{2}) campus. The hospital's historic original structure, which was completed and opened in 1929, remains as the centerpiece of the expanded campus at the hospital's central courtyard. In 2018 the hospital became part of Northwell Health and the name was officially changed to Mather Hospital.
