= James Mathers (missionary) =

Irish missionary (1854–1911)

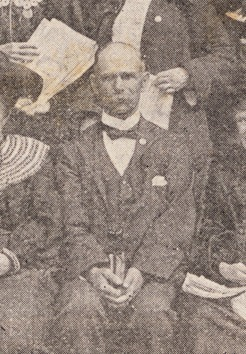
- Born: 6 June 1854; Lurgan, County Armagh, Ireland
- Died: 12 April 1911 (aged 56); Sydney, New South Wales
- Occupation: Missionary (sydney city mission)
- Spouse: Margaret Melrose
- Children: 5 children

James Mathers (6 June 1854 – 12 April 1911) was an Irish born missionary who emigrated to New South Wales and worked among Sydney's inner city poor for the Sydney City Mission.

== Early life ==
James Mathers was born in Lurgan, County Armagh, son of Scottish born parents and raised in Glasgow. Mathers joined the Free Church of Scotland after being converted at the Moody and Sankey mission in 1874. His younger brother Thomas was also moved by the 1874 mission to evangelise and also moved with his family to Sydney.

== Career ==
=== Scotland ===
Mathers began work for the Caledonian Railway Company (DC), before moving into construction engineering. Following his conversion he pursued evangelistic activity as a lay missionary in several city missions in the region of Glasgow. His mission work included open-air preaching and organising worship music for bands at Dykehead and Motherwell missions.

=== New South Wales ===
Mathers emigrated to New South Wales in 1897 with his wife Margaret and five children to work as a missionary amongst Sydney's inner-city poor. Based in The Rocks he worked for the Sydney City Mission until his death.

Sydney City Mission pioneered outreach to residents of slum areas of the inner-city. The mission required its workers to make home visits, spend time with the aged, infirm and lonely as well as to dispense practical help in the form of food, clothing and financial assistance.

His mission activity combined charitable work and evangelism. He visited the poor and sick, providing food parcels and Sunday breakfasts from Mission Hall in lower Fort Street. From here ran open-air services as well as Sunday evening evangelistic meetings.

== Personal life ==
In emigrating to New South Wales, James Mathers, followed in the footsteps of his brother and sister who had settled in Sydney.

James Mathers and his family settled in the Sydney suburb of Mosman. The Sydney City Mission divided the city into four districts and assigned its missionaries to each district. Mathers was assigned as missionary to the Millers Point District, which included the Historic Rocks.

== Mather's Journal ==
Missionaries were required to keep detailed journals to be submitted for review to the Mission Secretary. Mather's journals have survived and document his daily work amongst the poor as well as providing an insight into his personal life and circumstances.

Extracts from the journals of missionaries are featured in the newspaper: The Sydney City Mission Herald (now Mission Beat). Mather’s mission work was featured in the Herald

== See also ==
- Benjamin Short
