= James Mathers (cricketer) =

Australian cricketer

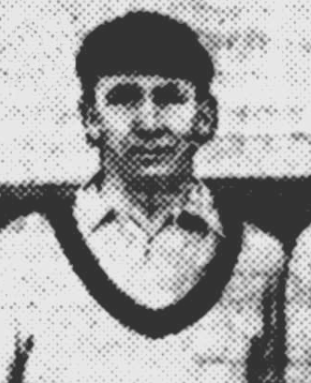
- Mathers in 1926

Personal information
- Born: 3 June 1894; Minmi, New South Wales, Australia
- Died: 28 March 1977 (aged 82); Eastwood, New South Wales, Australia

Domestic team information
- Years: Team
- 1923: Victoria
- Source: Cricinfo, 20 November 2015

James Mathers (30 June 1894 – 28 March 1977) was an Australian cricketer. He played one first-class cricket match for Victoria in 1923, where he scored 46 runs in the first innings team total of 1,059 runs.

== See also ==
- List of Victoria first-class cricketers
