= John Mather (cricketer) =

Australian cricketer

John Henry Mather
Personal information
- Born: 19 November 1821; Everton, Liverpool, England
- Died: 4 August 1870 (aged 48); Iquique, Chile

Domestic team information
- Years: Team
- 1856: Victoria
- Source: Cricinfo, 13 February 2015

John Henry Mather (19 November 1821 – 4 August 1870) was a British-born Australian cricketer. Born in England to John Philips Mather and Elizabeth Vaughan, he matriculated at Cambridge University in 1839 but later emigrated to Australia. He played one first-class cricket match for Victoria in 1856. He was the elder brother of Bishop Herbert Mather.

== See also ==
- List of Victoria first-class cricketers
