= Melissa Mather =

Australian physicist and professor

Melissa Louise Mather
- Education: Queensland University of Technology
- Scientific career
- Workplaces: Keele University; National Physical Laboratory; University of Nottingham
- Thesis: Ultrasound evaluation of radiation sensitive polymer gels (2003)

Melissa Louise Mather is an Australian physicist who is Professor in Biological Sensing and Imaging at the University of Nottingham. Her research considers the development of novel sensing techniques, including ultrasound, single molecule imaging and nitrogen-vacancy centers in diamond.

== Early life and education ==
Mather was an undergraduate student in physics at the Queensland University of Technology. She remained at QUT for her doctoral research, where she used ultrasound to investigate radiation sensitive polymer gels, based at the Centre for Medical, Health and Environmental Physics. She moved to the University of Nottingham as a research fellow in Applied Ultrasonics, where she studied industrially relevant suspensions using ultrasound. She also studied phase transitions in supercritical fluids. She then moved to the Applied Optics group as part of the Engineering and Physical Sciences Research Council Grand Challenge in Regenerative Medicine.

== Research and career ==
Mather moved to the National Physical Laboratory (NPL) in 2008, where she worked developed acoustic methods to study hydrogels. The NPL is the United Kingdom's measurement standards laboratory, and Mather developed an international standard on hydrogel characterisation with ASTM International.

Mather returned to the University of Nottingham in 2011, joining the Institute of Biophysics, Imaging and Optical Science (IBIOS) as an EPSRC Career Acceleration Fellow. At IBIOS, Mather worked on a liposome-based ultrasonic transducer and label-free optical microscopy for high-resolution cellular imaging. This imaging technique can help to predict stem cell differentiation, which is critical for the development of novel therapeutic strategies. She was appointed Director of the IBIOS in 2014. Mather moved to Keele University as Professor of Biomedical Imaging in 2015. She was awarded a European Research Council grant to study the structure of transmembrane proteins. By developing single molecule approaches Mather was able to image the proteins (ion channels) in their natural environment, which helps to understand various physiological processes.

Mather was moved back to the University of Nottingham in 2018, where she studied nitrogen-vacancy centers for quantum sensing.

== Selected publications ==
- Yves De Deene; C Hurley; A Venning; K Vergote; Melissa L. Mather; B J Healy; Clive Baldock (1 October 2002). "A basic study of some normoxic polymer gel dosimeters". Physics in Medicine and Biology. 47 (19): 3441–3463. doi:10.1088/0031-9155/47/19/301. ISSN 0031-9155. PMID 12408474. Wikidata Q44199309.
- Hongyun Tai; Melissa L Mather; Daniel Howard; et al. (17 December 2007). "Control of pore size and structure of tissue engineering scaffolds produced by supercritical fluid processing". European Cells and Materials. 14: 64–77. ISSN 1473-2262. PMID 18085505. Wikidata Q47256442.
- Melissa L. Mather; Andrew K Whittaker; Clive Baldock (1 May 2002). "Ultrasound evaluation of polymer gel dosimeters". Physics in Medicine and Biology. 47 (9): 1449–1458. doi:10.1088/0031-9155/47/9/302. ISSN 0031-9155. PMID 12043812. Wikidata Q56742946.
