= M. B. Mather =

British World War I flying ace

Malcolm Brown Mather
- Born: 7 November 1898; Falkirk, Stirlingshire, Scotland
- Died: 1 October 1980 (aged 81); Larbert, Falkirk, Scotland
- Military career
- Allegiance: United Kingdom
- Branch: British Army; Royal Air Force
- Rank: Corporal
- Unit: No. 20 Squadron RFC/RAF
- Conflicts: World War I; Western Front
- Awards: Distinguished Conduct Medal

Corporal Malcolm Brown Mather DCM (7 November 1898 – 1 October 1980) was a British World War I flying ace credited with eight aerial victories while flying as an observer.

== Military service ==
The son of Robert and Annie (Brown) Mather, Malcolm Brown Mather was a carpenter before enlisting into the Royal Flying Corps on 4 December 1916. He served as an observer/gunner in No. 20 Squadron flying the Bristol F.2b two-seater fighter.

His first aerial victory came on 2 December 1917, flying with Second Lieutenant Wilfred Beaver, when he destroyed an Albatros D.V south-east of Passendale. On 5 December he and Beaver drove down 'out of control' another D.V over Dadizeele. Mathers' next two victories came on 4 February 1918 over the Menen–Roulers road when he and pilot Lieutenant Rex G. Bennett drove down one D.V and sent another down in flames. On 17 February he and Second Lieutenant Ernest Lindup destroyed a Pfalz D.III over Westroosbeke. Mathers gained another double victory on 9 March with Second Lieutenant Leslie H. T. Capel, driving down two D.Vs south of Menen. For his final victory Mather was paired with Wilfred Beaver again, when he sent another D.V down in flames north of Ploegsteert Wood.

Mather's award of the Distinguished Conduct Medal was gazetted on 1 May 1918. His citation read:

20624 Corporal M. Mather, RFC.

"For conspicuous gallantry and devotion to duty while acting as observer. He was attacked by twelve enemy machines while flying over the enemy's lines, and in a fight which lasted fifteen minutes he shot down two of the enemy out of control and drove off the others. He undoubtedly saved his machine by his dogged determination. He has shown great skill and courage in many other aerial combats.
