= Richard Henry Mather =

American linguist

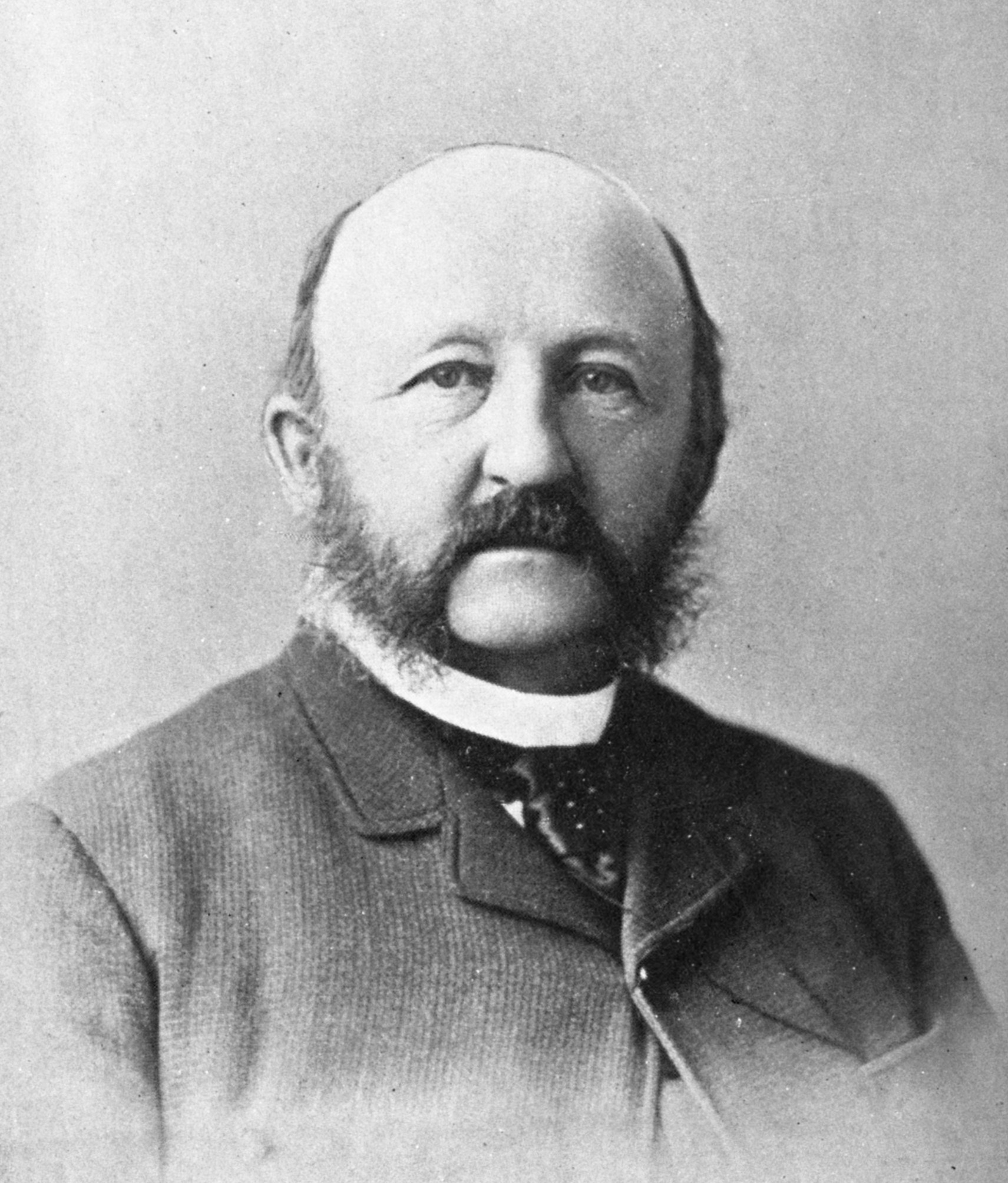

Signature
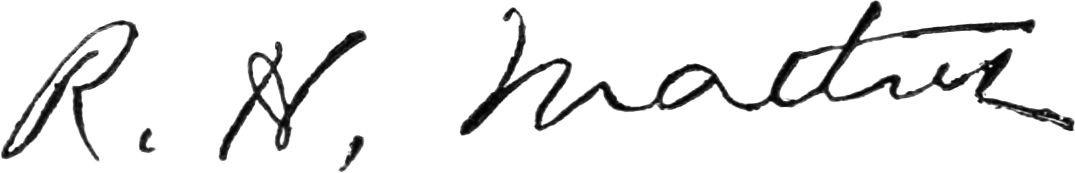

Richard Henry Mather (born in Binghamton, New York, 12 February 1835; died in Amherst, Massachusetts, 17 April 1890) was a professor of Greek at Amherst College.

== Biography ==
He graduated at Amherst, was tutor of Greek, assistant professor of that branch, professor of Greek and German in 1864, and professor of Greek and lecturer on sculpture in 1878.

He secured for Amherst College a fine collection of plaster casts, and he has assisted in the growth and development of the college in many other ways. He received the degree of D.D. from Bowdoin College in 1879. Although never the pastor of a church, he often supplied the pulpits of New York City, Boston, and other cities. He spent the winter of 1887/8 in Athens in connection with the work of his professorships.

== Works ==
He edited Greek textbooks for use in colleges, which passed through several editions. The principal ones are:

- Herodotus (1872)
- Selections from Thucydides
- Electra of Sophocles (1873)
- Abstract of lectures upon sculpture (1882)
- Prometheus Bound of Aeschylus (1883)
