= Richard B. Mather =

American sinologist

- Born: November 11, 1913; Baoding, Zhili Province, Republic of China
- Died: November 28, 2014 (aged 101); St. Paul, Minnesota, U.S.
- Education: Princeton University (BA); University of California, Berkeley (PhD)
- Spouse: Virginia Mather (d. 2012)
- Scientific career
- Fields: Chinese literature, poetry
- Workplaces: University of Minnesota
- Doctoral advisor: Peter A. Boodberg

Chinese name
- Traditional Chinese: 馬瑞志
- Simplified Chinese: 马瑞志
Transcriptions
Standard Mandarin
- Hanyu Pinyin: Mǎ Ruìzhì
- Gwoyeu Romatzyh: Maa Rueyjyh
- Wade–Giles: Ma Jui-chih

Richard Burroughs Mather (Chinese: 馬瑞志; pinyin: Mǎ Ruìzhì; November 11, 1913 – November 28, 2014) was an American sinologist who was a professor of Chinese at the University of Minnesota for 35 years.

== Life and career ==
Mather was born on November 11, 1913, in Baoding, China, where his American parents were serving as Protestant missionaries. His father was descended from the original Richard Mather of Massachusetts Bay. He lived in China for his entire youth before going to the United States in the early 1930s to attend Princeton University, where he graduated with a B.A., summa cum laude, in 1935. Even though he intended to return to China after his graduation, he was unable to do so due to the chaos of World War II. Instead, he entered the University of California, Berkeley, as a graduate student, where he earned a Ph.D. in Chinese literature in 1949 with a dissertation entitled, "The Doctrine of Non-Duality in the Vimalakīrtinirdeśa Sūtra."

Once he received his Ph.D. in 1949, Mather was hired as a professor at the University of Minnesota, where he founded the Chinese program and developed its courses. Mather taught full-time at the University of Minnesota until he was forced to retire in 1984 because of a university policy that required professors to retire at age 70. However, because of his specialized wealth of knowledge in classical Chinese, especially in the Chinese Six Dynasties period (220-589), he was allowed to teach part-time for several years after that and do directed studies for advanced students in Chinese.

He was honored with a festschrift in 2003: Studies in Early Medieval Chinese Literature and Cultural History: In Honor of Richard B. Mather & Donald Holzman.

After he completely retired from teaching In the late 1990s, Mather and another retired Chinese Professor at the University of Minnesota, Chun-jo Liu, teamed up to form a private Chinese reading and translating group. The group was composed of Chinese professors and other highly educated individuals who had an advanced knowledge of Chinese, especially classical Chinese. The group would generally meet once or twice a week to read Chinese literature and poetry and then translate it into English. The group also participated in Chinese language conferences at which their panel members would read papers on their particular areas of interest and research.

In early 2009, the group switched its focus from reading and translating Chinese to working on getting Mather's biography of his father, William Arnot Mather, and his own autobiography published as a single-volume memoir. The short biography of Mather from that family memoir, "William Arnot Mather, American Missionary to China and Richard Burroughs Mather, Professor of Chinese: The Biography and Autobiography of a Father and a Son," is as follows: "Richard B. Mather, an ordained Presbyterian minister and a professor emeritus of Chinese language and literature at the University of Minnesota-Twin Cities, is a world-renowned specialist of the Chinese Six Dynasties period (220-589). As the author of several noteworthy books, he is especially well-known for his monumental English translation of the Chinese classic, "Shih-shuo Hsin-yü," by Liu I-ch'ing (403-444). He and Virginia, his wife of 71 years, reside in Falcon Heights, Minnesota."

The Princeton Alumni Weekly (Note: July 15, 2009 - Volume 109, Number 16) featured a short article by Stephen Dittmann about Richard B. Mather that mentions Professor Mather's final book (Note: "William Arnot Mather, American Missionary to China and Richard Burroughs Mather, Professor of Chinese") and provides several paragraphs of biographical information on Professor Mather. Professor Mather was a Princeton graduate of 1935. A memorial to Richard B. Mather was also published in the Princeton Alumni Weekly (Note: December 2, 2015 - Volume 116, Number 5) that provides a black & white graduation picture and a brief biography.

Mather is best known for his monumental translation of the early medieval Chinese prose collection, "Shih-shuo Hsin-yü: A New Account of Tales of the World" (Note: Published title in Wade–Giles. Title in modern Hanyu Pinyin: "Shìshuō xīnyǔ"; title in traditional Chinese characters: 世說新語.)

== Selected works ==
- The Chinese-American Song and Game Book. New York: A.S. Barnes and Company, 1944.
- The Doctrine of Non-Duality in the Vimalakīrtinirdeśa Sūtra. Ph.D. dissertation. Berkeley, California: University of California, Berkeley, 1949.
- Mather, Richard B., 1913-2014 (author/translator). Biography of Lü Kuang: [Annotated translation of Chin shu 122]. Berkeley, California: University of California Press, 1959.
- ——— (1976). A New Account of Tales of the World (Shih-shuo Hsin-yü). Minneapolis-St. Paul: University of Minnesota Press. ISBN 0816607605. 2nd edition (2002), University of Michigan, Center for Chinese Studies. ISBN 089264155X
- ——— (1988). The Poet Shen Yüeh (441–513): The Reticent Marquis. Princeton: Princeton University Press.
- ——— (2003). The Age of Eternal Brilliance: Three Lyric Poets of the Yung-ming Era (483–493). Leiden: Brill.
- Mather, Richard B., 1913-2014 (author); Kindler, James M. (editor); August, Gary (artist); Bohr, P. Richard (Foreword author); Kindler, James M. (Afterword author). William Arnot Mather, American Missionary to China and Richard Burroughs Mather, Professor of Chinese: The Biography and Autobiography of a Father and a Son. Lewiston, New York: Edwin Mellen Press, 2010. One volume, 61 numbered pages; Illustrated with numerous black & white photographs, including the family portrait on the front cover; Index, pages 53–61. 8vo: original grey boards with black and red printing. ISBN 978-0-7734-1314-6.
