= Patricia Mather =

Australian zoologist and taxonomist (1925–2012)

Pat Mather
- Born: Patricia Kott; 12 December 1925; Western Australia
- Died: 4 January 2012 (aged 86)
- Scientific career
- Fields: Invertebrates; Sea squirts
- Workplaces: CSIRO; University of Queensland; Queensland Museum

Patricia Mather (née Kott) AO (12 December 1925 – 4 January 2012) was an Australian zoologist and taxonomist known for her research into sea squirts. She became a leader in Australian marine science and achieved international status through her work on the Ascidiacea. She has published (under her maiden name, Patricia Kott) more than 150 papers including a major monograph on the "Australian Ascidiacea" (in four parts between 1985 and 2001).

== Early life ==
Patricia Mather (born Patricia Kott) on 12 December 1925 in Perth was raised and educated in Western Australia. She received an early introduction into marine science during holiday jobs sorting plankton at the CSIR (later to become the CSIRO) Fisheries Division.

After graduating from the University of Western Australia in 1948 with a B.Sc. first-class honours degree she was appointed plankton officer in the Fisheries Division at Cronulla, New South Wales. After completing her MSc in 1949 she was made a CSIR overseas student and studied in England at the University College (London University) doing a course on invertebrates. She also studied the ascidian collections in the British Natural History Museum. Patricia then went on to continue studies at the Marine Biological Association Laboratory in Plymouth.

Upon her return to Australia in 1951 and work with the CSIRO as a plankton officer, she became focused on the taxonomy of the ascidiacea.

Patricia married Wharton Burdett Mather, a lecturer at the University of Queensland in 1955 and thus was forced to leave the CSIRO. (On marriage, since she was a Commonwealth public servant, she was forced to retire: Australian law of the time permitted no married women to be Commonwealth public servants.)

Waldo Schmitt from the Smithsonian Institution in Washington, D.C., asked her to write a monograph on Antarctic ascidiacea located in the American national collections in the mid-1960s. Upon completion of this work she returned to Australia. She earnt her DSc. from the University of Western Australia in 1970. Mather was appointed a curator at the Queensland Museum in 1973 and later rose to senior curator.

Mather published 150 scientific papers (under her maiden name Patricia Kott). She described 500 new species.

She was secretary and late President of the Great Barrier Reef Committee in the 1970s and helped to establish the Great Barrier Reef Marine Park Authority, including providing scientific evidence to the two royal commissions which investigated drilling on the Great Barrier Reef and contributed to the drafting of legislation that formed the Great Barrier Marine Park Authority.

Mather retired in 1990 but continued working at the Queensland Museum as an honorary associate until October 2011.

== Awards ==
- 1991 Queensland Museum medal
- 1992 Australian Museum Science Association Jubilee Prize
- 1992 Officer of the Order of Australia
- Whitley award - best book on science history. Time for a museum: a history of the Queensland Museum (1986)
- Whitley award – best book on natural history. The coral reef handbook (1993) with Isobel Bennett.

== Legacy ==
Patricia Mather died on 4 January 2012, in Brisbane, Queensland and was survived by her three sons and six grandsons. A street is named for her in the Dutton Park Biosciences Precinct – Patricia Mather Place.

== Partial listing of publications ==
- Patricia Kott (1985). "The Australian Ascidiacea Part I, Phlebobranchia and Stolidobranchia". Memoirs of the Queensland Museum. 23: 1–438. Wikidata Q127255890.
- Patricia Kott (December 2004). "Ascidiacea (Tunicata) in Australian Waters of the Timor and Arafura Seas". The Beagle. 20: 37–81. ISSN 0811-3653. Wikidata Q108329585.

== Taxa named by Patricia Kott ==
Category:Taxa named by Patricia Kott
