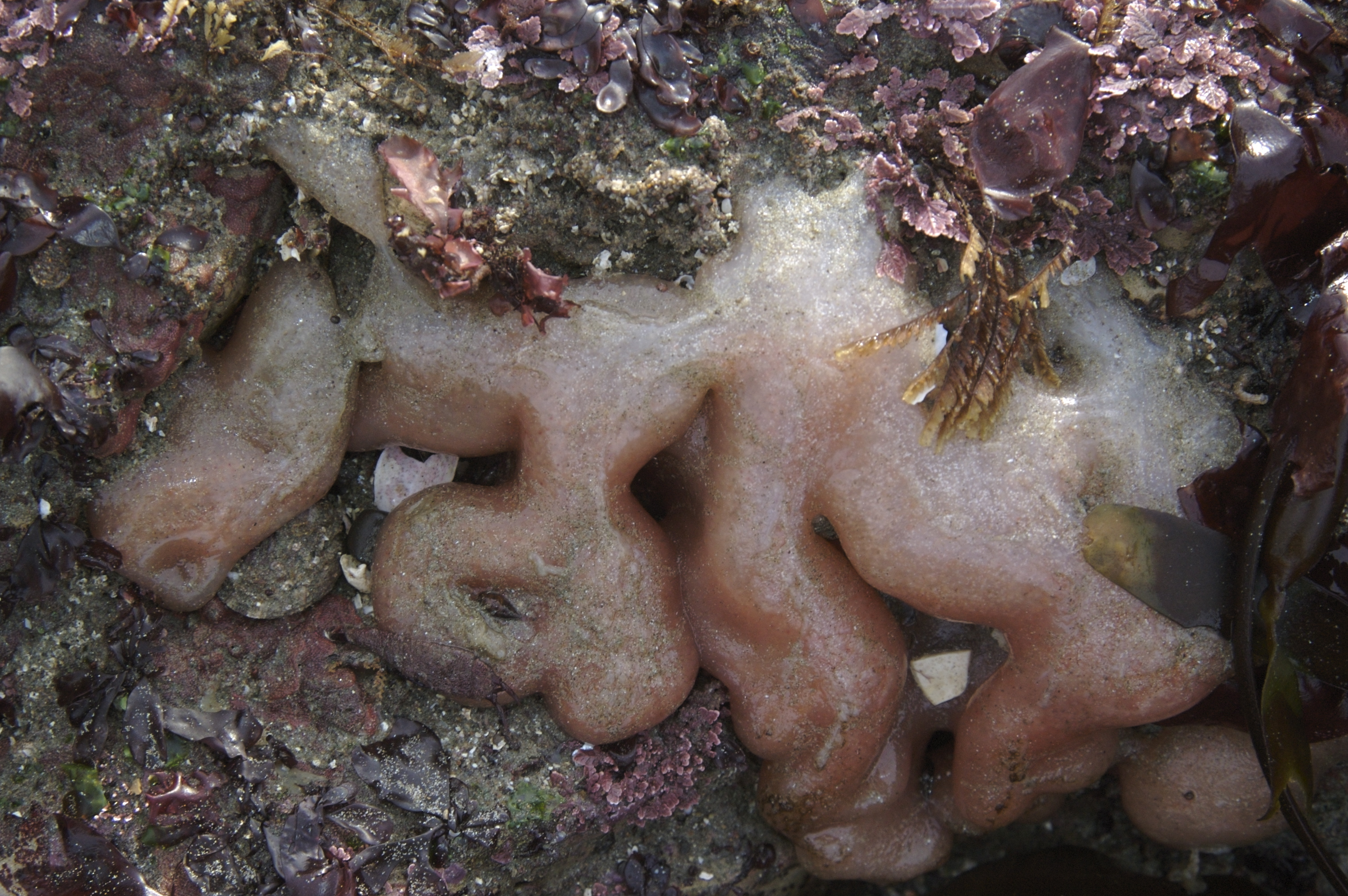
- Aplidium californicum

Scientific classification
- Domain: Eukaryota
- Kingdom: Animalia
- Phylum: Chordata
- Subphylum: Tunicata
- Class: Ascidiacea
- Order: Aplousobranchia
- Family: Polyclinidae; Milne-Edwards, 1841

Genera
- See text

= Polyclinidae =

Family of tunicates

Polyclinidae is a family of tunicates in the order Aplousobranchia.

== Genera ==
The World Register of Marine Species lists the following genera:

- Aplidiopsis Lahille, 1890
- Aplidium Savigny, 1816
- Morchellioides Herdman, 1886
- Morchellium Giard, 1872
- Neodictyon Sanamyan, 1988
- Polyclinella Harant, 1931
- Polyclinum Savigny, 1816
- Sidneioides Kesteven, 1909
- Synoicum Phipps, 1774
