= Diplosoma =

Diplosoma may refer to:

- Diplosoma (tunicate), a genus of tunicates in the family Didemnidae
- Diplosoma (plant), a genus of plants in the family Aizoaceae
