= Tistrella bauzanensis =

Scientific classification
- Domain: Bacteria
- Kingdom: Pseudomonadati
- Phylum: Pseudomonadota
- Class: Alphaproteobacteria
- Order: Rhodospirillales
- Family: Geminicoccaceae
- Genus: Tistrella
- Species: T. bauzanensis

Binomial name
- Tistrella bauzanensis Zhang et al. 2011

Type strain
- CGMCC 1.10188, DSM 22817, LMG 26047, strain BZ78

Genus of bacteria

Tistrella bauzanensis is a Gram-positive, strictly aerobic, rod-shaped and motile bacterium from the genus of Tistrella which has been isolated from soil from Bozen in Italy. Tistrella bauzanensis produces didemnin B.
