= Tistrella mobilis =

Scientific classification
- Domain: Bacteria
- Kingdom: Pseudomonadati
- Phylum: Pseudomonadota
- Class: Alphaproteobacteria
- Order: Rhodospirillales
- Family: Geminicoccaceae
- Genus: Tistrella
- Species: T. mobilis

Binomial name
- Tistrella mobilis Shi et al. 2003

Type strain
- IAM 14872, JCM 21370, NBRC 102134, TISTR 1108

Genus of bacteria

Tistrella mobilis is a Gram-negative, strictly aerobic, rod-shaped and highly motile bacterium from the genus of Tistrella which has been isolated from wastewater in Thailand. Tistrella mobilis produces didemnins.
