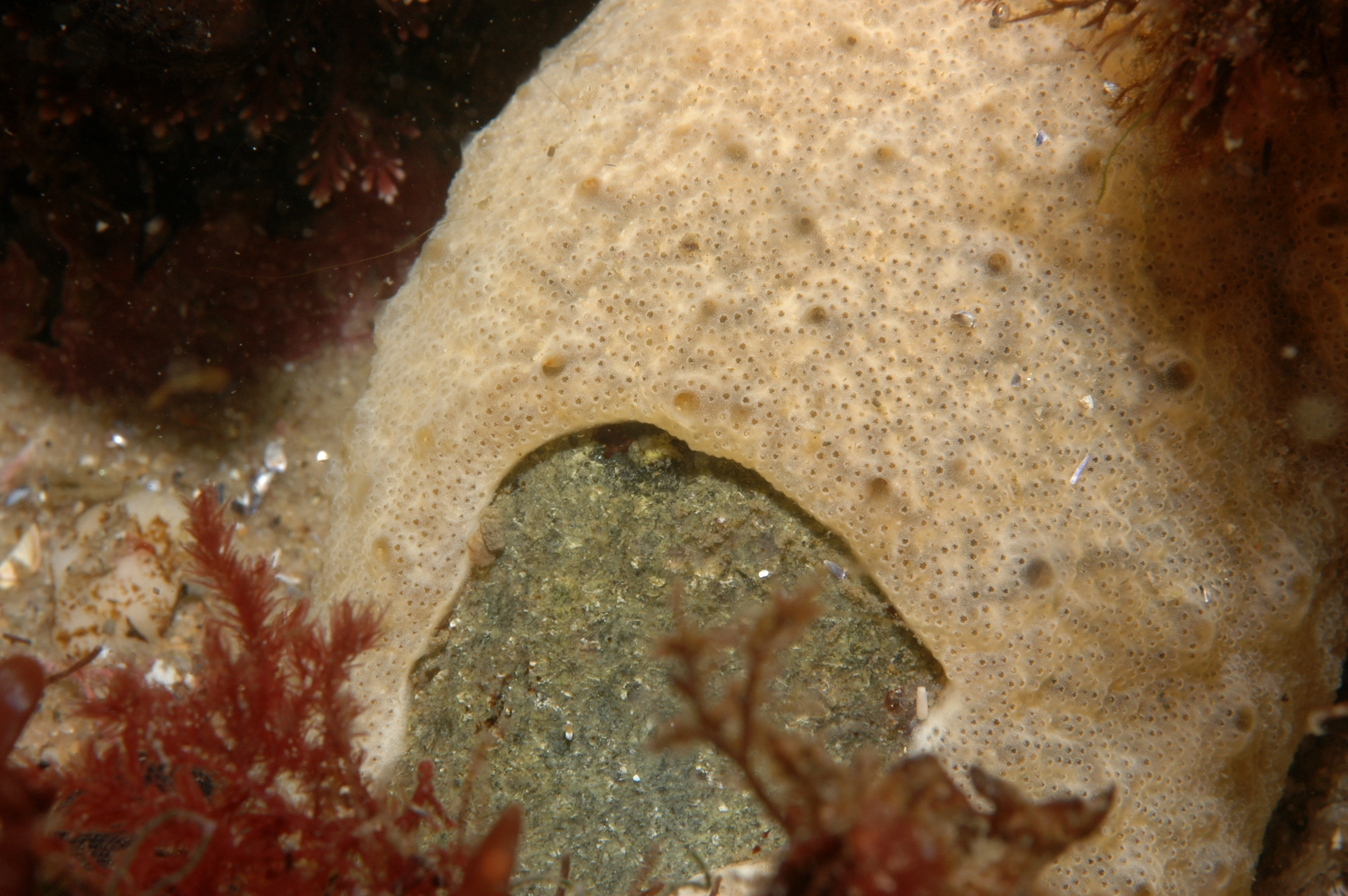

Scientific classification
- Kingdom: Animalia
- Phylum: Chordata
- Subphylum: Tunicata
- Class: Ascidiacea
- Order: Aplousobranchia
- Family: Didemnidae
- Genus: Didemnum
- Species: D. vexillum

Binomial name
- Didemnum vexillum Kott, 2002

Synonyms
- Didemnum vestitum Kott, 2004; Didemnum vestum Kott, 2004

= Didemnum vexillum =

Species of sea squirt

Didemnum vexillum is a species of colonial tunicate in the family Didemnidae. It is commonly called sea vomit, marine vomit, pancake batter tunicate, or carpet sea squirt. It is thought to be native to Japan, but it has been reported as an invasive species in a number of places in Europe, North America and New Zealand. It is sometimes given the nickname "D. vex" because of the vexing way in which it dominates marine ecosystems when introduced into new locations; however, the species epithet vexillum actually derives from the Latin word for flag, and the species was so named because of the way colonies' long tendrils appear to wave in the water like a flag.

D. vexillum can grow on most hard substrates, including cobble, boulders, and artificial structures including boats, dock pilings, and aquaculture equipment. It can also grow over other organisms, including sessile invertebrates, algae, and eelgrass. Its appearance has given rise to the common names of sea vomit or marine vomit. It was first described from New Zealand as Didemnum vexillum by Patricia Kott in 2002. The species had been discovered previously in its native region of Japan.

== Description ==
A colony of Didemnum vexillum consists of a number of sac-shaped zooids connected by a common tunic. Each zooid is about 1 mm (0.04 in) long and has a buccal siphon through which water is drawn into the interior. The water then passes into a shared cavity from which it is pumped out through an atrial siphon. The surface of the colony is smooth, leathery, and often veined in appearance; the buccal siphons appear as numerous fine pores, and the atrial siphons as a smaller number of larger holes. The colony is firmly attached to a hard surface from which it can be difficult to detach.

D. vexillum has different forms in different locations. It can form a thin or thick encrusting mat, or form large or small lobes. The colour can be orange, pink, tan, creamy yellow or greyish-white and the tunic is sparsely strengthened by stellate spicules with nine to eleven rays. Where there is little water movement, the colonies may dangle in ropey masses from hard substrates, such as cables, docks, and the hulls of vessels. These stringy formations have led to it being colloquially referred to as "sea cheese" in Canada. In places with stronger currents, they cover the surface of rocks, boulders, pebbles, gravel, and oysterbeds in a thin, encrusting layer.

== Distribution ==
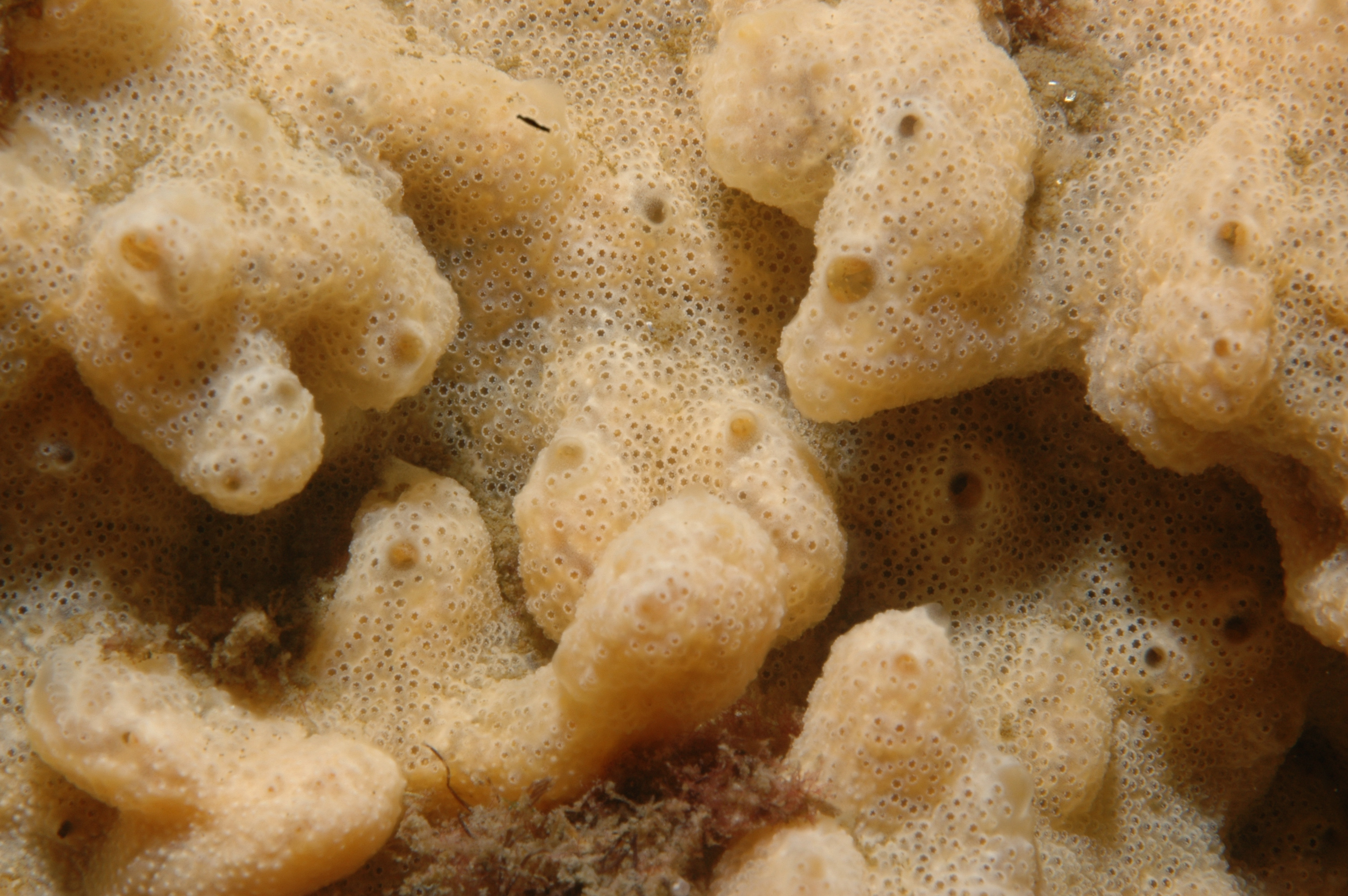
Tunicate colony of Didemnum vexillum. Large openings are atrial siphons; brown material in them is interpreted to be faecal matter in cavities below the apertures.

Didemnum vexillum appears to be native to Japan, where it was recorded in Mutsu Bay in 1926. It is still common there and, as well as growing on rock surfaces and seagrasses (Zostera), it grows as a fouling organism on cultured bivalves, net cages, pilings and other man-made structures. Its depth range is from the intertidal zone down to a depth of about 80 m (262 ft).

The Portuguese oyster (Crassostrea angulata) cultivated off the Atlantic coast of France and Portugal was largely killed by an iridoviral disease in 1969. To replace the stock, large quantities of Pacific oyster (Crassostrea gigas) spat were imported from Japan. Some efforts were made to kill any fouling organisms that might be associated with the spat by immersing it for two periods, each of one hour, in fresh water. However, in the early 1970s, there were reports of a brown Didemnum ascidian on oyster beds in the region. Around the same time, oyster spat from Japan was introduced into the Pacific coastal regions of Canada and the US and soon afterwards an ascidian was observed there, and later identified as D. vexillum. By 2014, this tunicate was present in the eastern Atlantic, North Sea and Mediterranean Sea in the Netherlands, the United Kingdom, Ireland, France and Italy. On the east coast of North America its range extended from New Jersey, New York, Connecticut, Rhode Island, Massachusetts and New Hampshire, to Maine. In the eastern Pacific its range extends from Alaska to California. It is also present in New Zealand, where it was first observed in 2001, its only known encroachment into the Southern Hemisphere. The Massachusetts Institute of Technology (MIT) built an autonomous underwater vehicle, named "Odyssey IV" that was used to monitor the spread of Didemnum at George's Bank.

Because this ascidian broods its embryos and the larvae are free-swimming for only a brief time, natural dispersal of D. vexillum is limited in extent. Dispersal to new habitats in far flung parts of the world is likely to be through its accidental conveyance on the hulls of boats or other floating structures, or its introduction to aquaculture installations, perhaps with commercial oyster spat, seed mussels or aquaculture equipment.

== Biology ==
Like other colonial ascidians, Didemnum vexillum is a suspension feeder. Water is drawn in through the buccal siphon of each zooid, the plankton and fine particles of detritus are filtered out, and the water and waste products leave through a common atrial siphon.

Each individual zooid is a hermaphrodite. Sperm is liberated into the sea and may get drawn into another zooid with the water current, fertilisation taking place internally. The embryos have yolks from which they derive nourishment while they are brooded inside the colonial tunic. When they hatch, after about two weeks, the larvae have a short free-living stage lasting up to a few hours, before undergoing metamorphosis into a zooid ready to found a new colony. The new colony grows by asexual reproduction, with new zooids budding off existing ones. A fragment of a colony may become detached (perhaps by "dripping" off a floating structure), adhere to a new substrate and found a new colony. Such colonies can grow rapidly, with a six- to eleven-fold increase in colony size having been observed over a fifteen-day period.

== Invasive impact ==
Didemnum vexillum is capable of forming large colonies which can overgrow rocks and gravel, smother benthic organisms and change the marine balance of the seafloor community. In some places in the Netherlands it covers 95% of the seabed and there is a marked decrease in populations of the sea urchin Psammechinus miliaris and the brittle star Ophiothrix fragilis. On the Georges Bank, Massachusetts, the seabed community is also changed, with some invertebrates decreasing but others, such as two species of polychaete worm, increasing in abundance. Here, D. vexillum restricts the potential settling sites for larvae of the bay scallop (Argopecten irradians) and the sea scallop (Placopecten magellenaicus). It exudes a toxic substance which discourages predators and prevents the larvae of other species from settling on it. In New Zealand it overgrows mussels and aquaculture equipment, but has not had quite such a devastating effect on the ecology as anticipated.

In Scotland, where it has been found to clog up aquaculture pens, other marine infrastructure and boat propellors, a black Labrador dog has been trained to detect the organism by smell and point to it.

== Genome assembly ==
In 2016 the draft genome of Didemnum vexillum reported the non-coding RNA annotation complement. To this end a combination of several computational approaches, including blast searches with a wide range of parameters, and secondary structured-centred survey with infernal. The resulting candidate set was curated extensively to produce a high-quality ncRNA annotation of the first draft of the D. vexillum genome. It comprises 57 miRNA families, 4 families of ribosomal RNAs, 22 isoacceptor classes of tRNAs (of which more than 72% of loci are pseudogenes), 13 snRNAs, 12 snoRNAs, and 1 other RNA family. Additionally, 21 families of mitochondrial tRNAs and 2 of mitochondrial ribosomal RNAs and 1 long non-coding RNA.

A new version of D. vexillum genome is online available. This new version combines PacBio technology and the Illumina raw data used to assembly the first draft genome version published in BMC genomics.
