= Tistrella =

Scientific classification
- Domain: Bacteria
- Kingdom: Pseudomonadati
- Phylum: Pseudomonadota
- Class: Alphaproteobacteria
- Order: Rhodospirillales
- Family: Geminicoccaceae
- Genus: Tistrella; Shi et al. 2003

Type species
- Tistrella mobilis

Species
- T. bauzanensis T. mobilis

Genus of bacteria

Tistrella is a bacterial genus from the family of Rhodospirillaceae. Tistrella produces didemnins.
