= Leptoclinides cucurbitus =

Scientific classification
- Kingdom: Animalia
- Phylum: Chordata
- Subphylum: Tunicata
- Class: Ascidiacea
- Order: Aplousobranchia
- Family: Didemnidae
- Genus: Leptoclinides
- Species: L. cucurbitus

Binomial name
- Leptoclinides cucurbitus Kott, 2004

Species of sea squirt

Leptoclinides cucurbitus is an Ascidiacea from the family Didemnidae. The scientific name of the species was first published and made valid by Kott in 2004.
