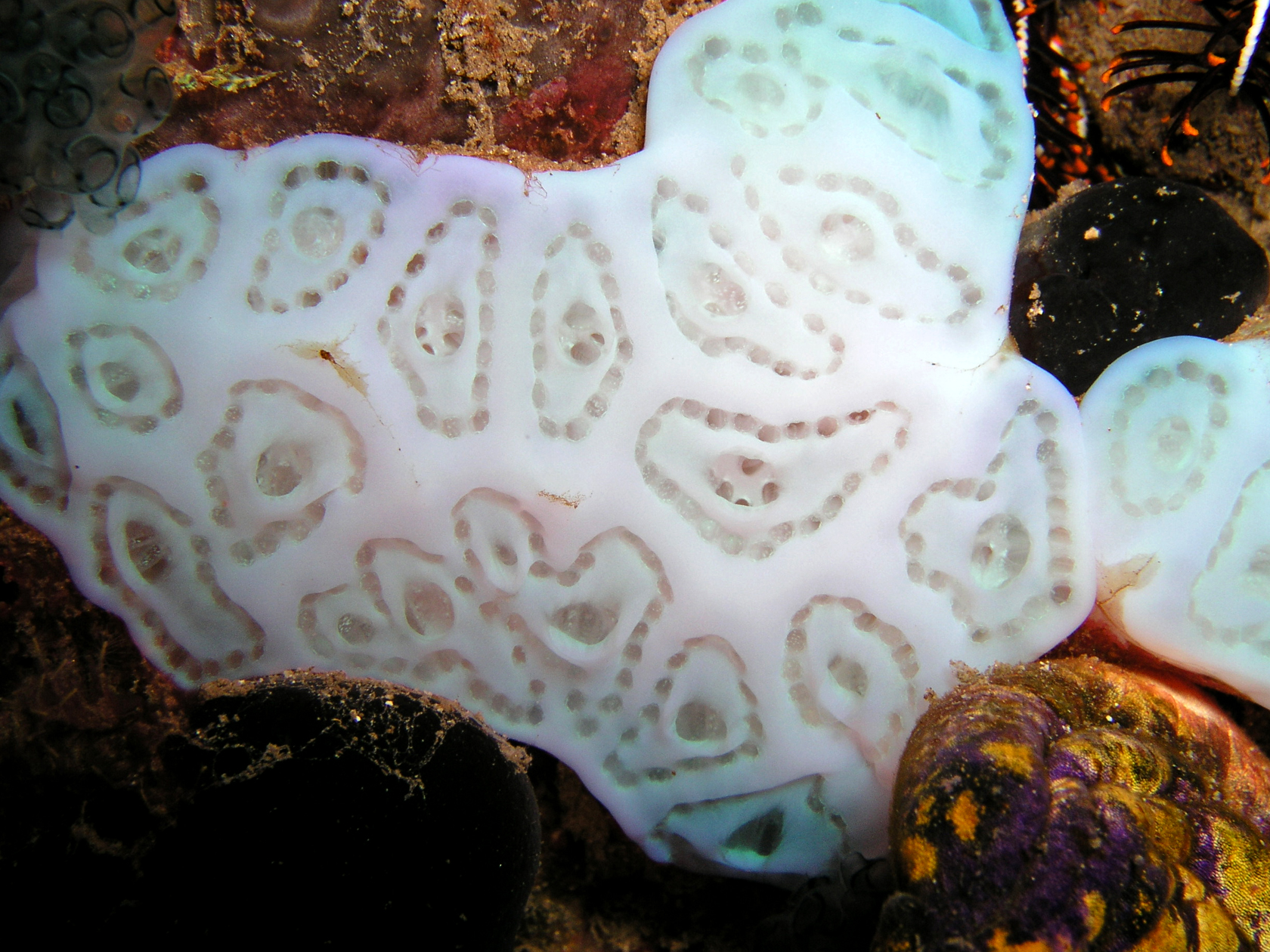

Scientific classification
- Kingdom: Animalia
- Phylum: Chordata
- Subphylum: Tunicata
- Class: Ascidiacea
- Order: Aplousobranchia
- Family: Didemnidae
- Genus: Lissoclinum
- Species: L. patella

Binomial name
- Lissoclinum patella (Gottschaldt, 1898)

= Lissoclinum patella =

Species of sea squirt

Lissoclinum patella is a species of ascidian in the family Didemnidae.

== Description ==
Lissoclinum patella is a sprawling ascidian that grows in coastal areas near Indonesia and Australia, including the Great Barrier Reef. Its green hue is due to the colonies of cyanobacteria that grow within its tissue as symbionts, one known species is Prochloron didemni. The biochemical products of its cyanobacteria is an active area of research, as example the circular peptide, Patellamide A.

== Distribution ==
This species is found in the tropical eastern Indian Ocean and the western Pacific Ocean. Its range includes the Philippines, Indonesia and northern Australia. Its depth range is 1 to 28 m (3 ft 3 in to 91 ft 10 in).
