= Lissoclinum fragile =

Scientific classification
- Kingdom: Animalia
- Phylum: Chordata
- Subphylum: Tunicata
- Class: Ascidiacea
- Order: Aplousobranchia
- Family: Didemnidae
- Genus: Lissoclinum
- Species: L. fragile

Binomial name
- Lissoclinum fragile (Van Name, 1902)

Species of tunicate

Lissoclinum fragile is a species of tunicate. This species was named by Willard G. Van Name in 1902.

This species is a colonial ascidian. This means that they are marine organisms that are able to engage in a variety of pharmacological activities. This includes antimicrobial, hemolytic, and cytotoxic properties and activities.
