= Clitella =

Scientific classification
- Kingdom: Animalia
- Phylum: Chordata
- Subphylum: Tunicata
- Class: Ascidiacea
- Order: Aplousobranchia
- Family: Didemnidae
- Genus: Clitella; Kott, 2001
- Species: C. nutricula

Binomial name
- Clitella nutricula Kott, 2001

Genus of sea squirts

Clitella is a genus of tunicates from the family Didemnidae in the order Aplousobranchia. The genus contains a single species, Clitella nutricula.
