= Atriolum robustum =

Scientific classification
- Kingdom: Animalia
- Phylum: Chordata
- Subphylum: Tunicata
- Class: Ascidiacea
- Order: Aplousobranchia
- Family: Didemnidae
- Genus: Atriolum
- Species: A. robustum

Binomial name
- Atriolum robustum Kott, 1983

Synonyms
- Atriolum robostum Kott, 1983

Species of sea squirt

Atriolum robustum is a colonial tunicate or sea squirt in the family Didemnidae. It is native to the western and central Indo-Pacific where it is usually found anchored to a hard surface in shallow water.

== Description ==
A colony of Atriolum robustum consists of a number of hollow, urn-shaped zooids up to 1.5 cm (0.6 in) long, each with a large circular terminal hole, the atrial siphon, and connected by an encrusting base. The tunic (body wall) is firm to the touch and is perforated by a number of pore-like buccal siphons, each raised on a slight elevation, giving the zooid a pine cone-like appearance. The tunic contains a red pigment but the colour of this is often masked by the presence of yellowish-green cyanobacteria (Prochloron sp.) and may only be visible in the interior and at the rim of the atrial syphon. This sea squirt is sometimes confused with Didemnum molle but that species has a network of internal channels and exudes mucus, making it sticky to the touch.

== Distribution ==
Atriolum robustum is found in the tropical western and central Indo-Pacific region at depths between about 12 and 300 m (39 and 984 ft). Its range extends from Madagascar to Australia and Papua New Guinea and includes Réunion and Mayotte.

== Biology ==
Atriolum robustum feeds on phytoplankton, zooplankton and minute pieces of detritus. Water gets drawn into the zooid through the buccal openings, the edible particles are then filtered out and the water current leaves the zooid through the atrial siphon. Sexual reproduction involves sperm being drawn into the body cavity with the inflowing water current and eggs being fertilised internally. The developing embryos are brooded at first.

This tunicate is itself eaten by various predators including the Egyptian sea star, Gomophia egyptiaca and the sea snail, Gyrineum gyrinum.
