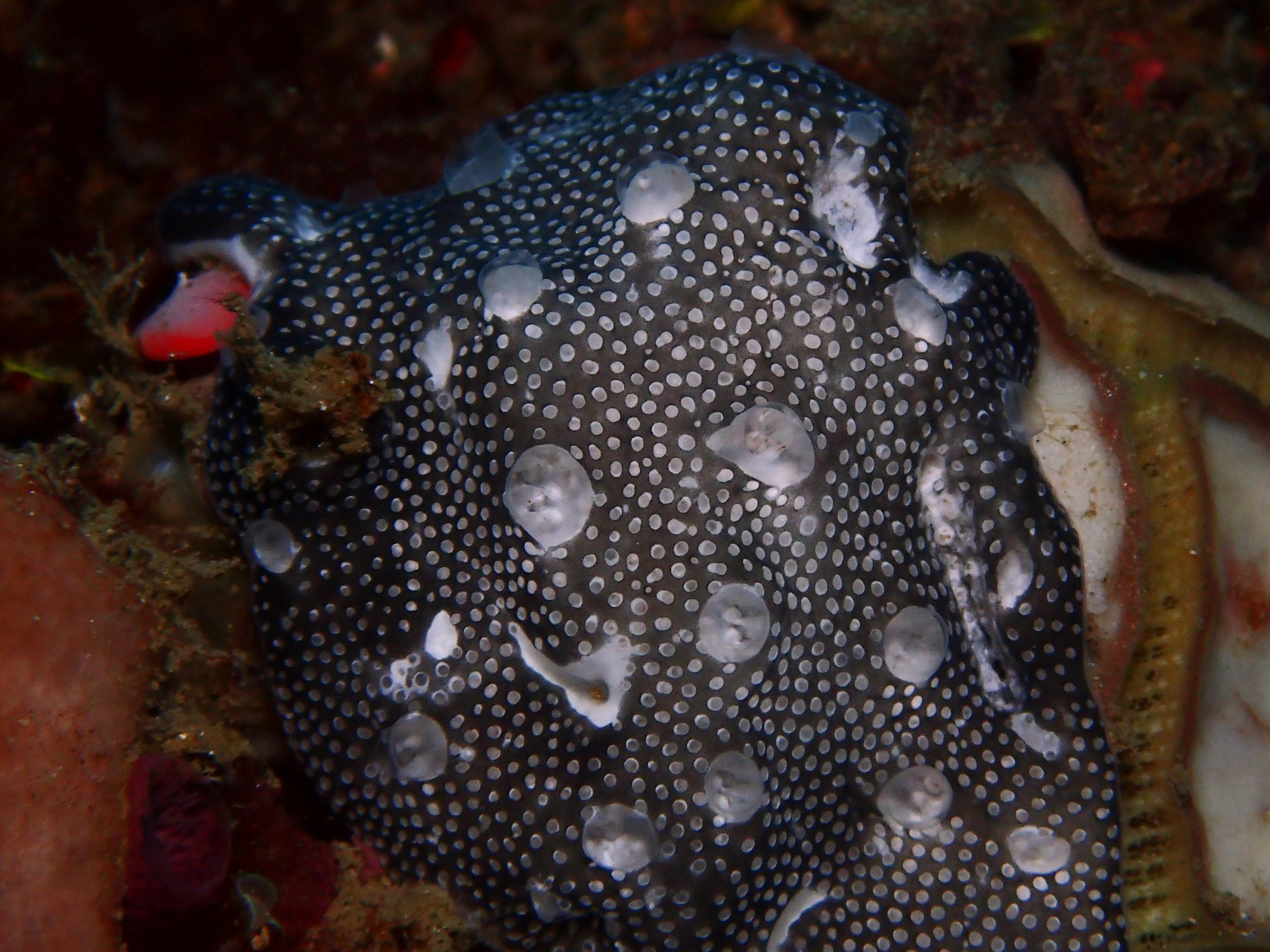
- Leptoclinides reticulatus

Scientific classification
- Domain: Eukaryota
- Kingdom: Animalia
- Phylum: Chordata
- Subphylum: Tunicata
- Class: Ascidiacea
- Order: Aplousobranchia
- Family: Didemnidae
- Genus: Leptoclinides; Bjerkan, 1905

Type species
- Leptoclinides faeroensis Bjerkan, 1905

Synonyms
- Askonides Kott, 1962

= Leptoclinides =

Genus of sea squirts

Leptoclinides is a genus of tunicates belonging to the family Didemnidae. The genus has a cosmopolitan distribution.

== Species ==
The following species are recognised in the genus Leptoclinides:

- Leptoclinides aciculus Kott, 2001
- Leptoclinides albamaculatus Kott, 2001
- Leptoclinides apertus Monniot F., 1989
- Leptoclinides aspiculatum Romanov, 1989
- Leptoclinides auranticus Brewin, 1956
- Leptoclinides brandi Kott, 2001
- Leptoclinides brasiliensis Michaelsen, 1923
- Leptoclinides caelestis Kott, 2001
- Leptoclinides capensis Michaelsen, 1934
- Leptoclinides carduus Kott, 2001
- Leptoclinides cavernosus Kott, 2001
- Leptoclinides coelenteratus (Kott, 1962)
- Leptoclinides comitus Kott, 2001
- Leptoclinides compactus Kott, 2001
- Leptoclinides complexus Kott, 2002
- Leptoclinides confirmatus Kott, 2001
- Leptoclinides constellatus Kott, 2001
- Leptoclinides coronatus Oliveira, Carvalho & Rocha, 2019
- Leptoclinides crocotulus Paiva et al., 2015
- Leptoclinides cucurbitus Kott, 2004
- Leptoclinides cuspidatus (Sluiter, 1909)
- Leptoclinides decoratus Kott, 2004
- Leptoclinides diemenensis Michaelsen, 1924
- Leptoclinides doboensis (Sluiter, 1913)
- Leptoclinides dubius (Sluiter, 1909)
- Leptoclinides duminus Millar, 1982
- Leptoclinides durus Kott, 2001
- Leptoclinides echinatus Tokioka, 1954
- Leptoclinides echinus Kott, 2001
- Leptoclinides erinaceus Kott, 2001
- Leptoclinides exiguus Kott, 2001
- Leptoclinides faeroensis Bjerkan, 1905
- Leptoclinides fluxus Kott, 2007
- Leptoclinides frustus Kott, 2005
- Leptoclinides fungiformis Kott, 1972
- Leptoclinides grandistellus Kott, 2004
- Leptoclinides hawaiiensis Tokioka, 1967
- Leptoclinides imperfectus (Kott, 1962)
- Leptoclinides kerguelenensis Kott, 1954
- Leptoclinides kingi Michaelsen, 1930
- Leptoclinides latus Monniot F., 1983
- Leptoclinides levitatus Kott, 2001
- Leptoclinides lissus Hastings, 1931
- Leptoclinides longicollis Kott, 2001
- Leptoclinides lotufoi Oliveira, Carvalho & Rocha, 2019
- Leptoclinides macrotestis Romanov, 1977
- Leptoclinides maculatus Kott, 2001
- Leptoclinides madara Tokioka, 1953
- Leptoclinides magnistellus Kott, 2001
- Leptoclinides marmoratus (Sluiter, 1909)
- Leptoclinides marmoreus Brewin, 1956
- Leptoclinides minimus Kott, 2005
- Leptoclinides multilobatus Kott, 1954
- Leptoclinides multipapillatus Monniot F., 1989
- Leptoclinides novaezelandiae Brewin, 1958
- Leptoclinides ocellatus (Sluiter, 1909)
- Leptoclinides oscitans Monniot F. & Monniot C., 1996
- Leptoclinides placidus Kott, 2001
- Leptoclinides planus Monniot F., 2010
- Leptoclinides prunus Kott, 2004
- Leptoclinides pulvinus Kott, 2005
- Leptoclinides ramosum (Gottschaldt, 1898)
- Leptoclinides reticulatus (Sluiter, 1909)
- Leptoclinides rigidus Kott, 2001
- Leptoclinides robiginis Monniot F., 1989
- Leptoclinides rufus (Sluiter, 1909)
- Leptoclinides rugosum Tokioka, 1962
- Leptoclinides seminudus Kott, 2001
- Leptoclinides sluiteri Brewin, 1950
- Leptoclinides sparsus Michaelsen, 1924
- Leptoclinides subviridis (Sluiter, 1909)
- Leptoclinides sulawesii Monniot F. & Monniot C., 1996
- Leptoclinides torosus Monniot F., 1983
- Leptoclinides tuberculatus Kott, 2004
- Leptoclinides tulearensis Plante & Vasseur, 1966
- Leptoclinides umbrosus Kott, 2001
- Leptoclinides uniorbis Monniot F. & Monniot C., 1996
- Leptoclinides unitestis Monniot F., 1989
- Leptoclinides vesica Kott, 2008
- Leptoclinides volvus Kott, 1975
