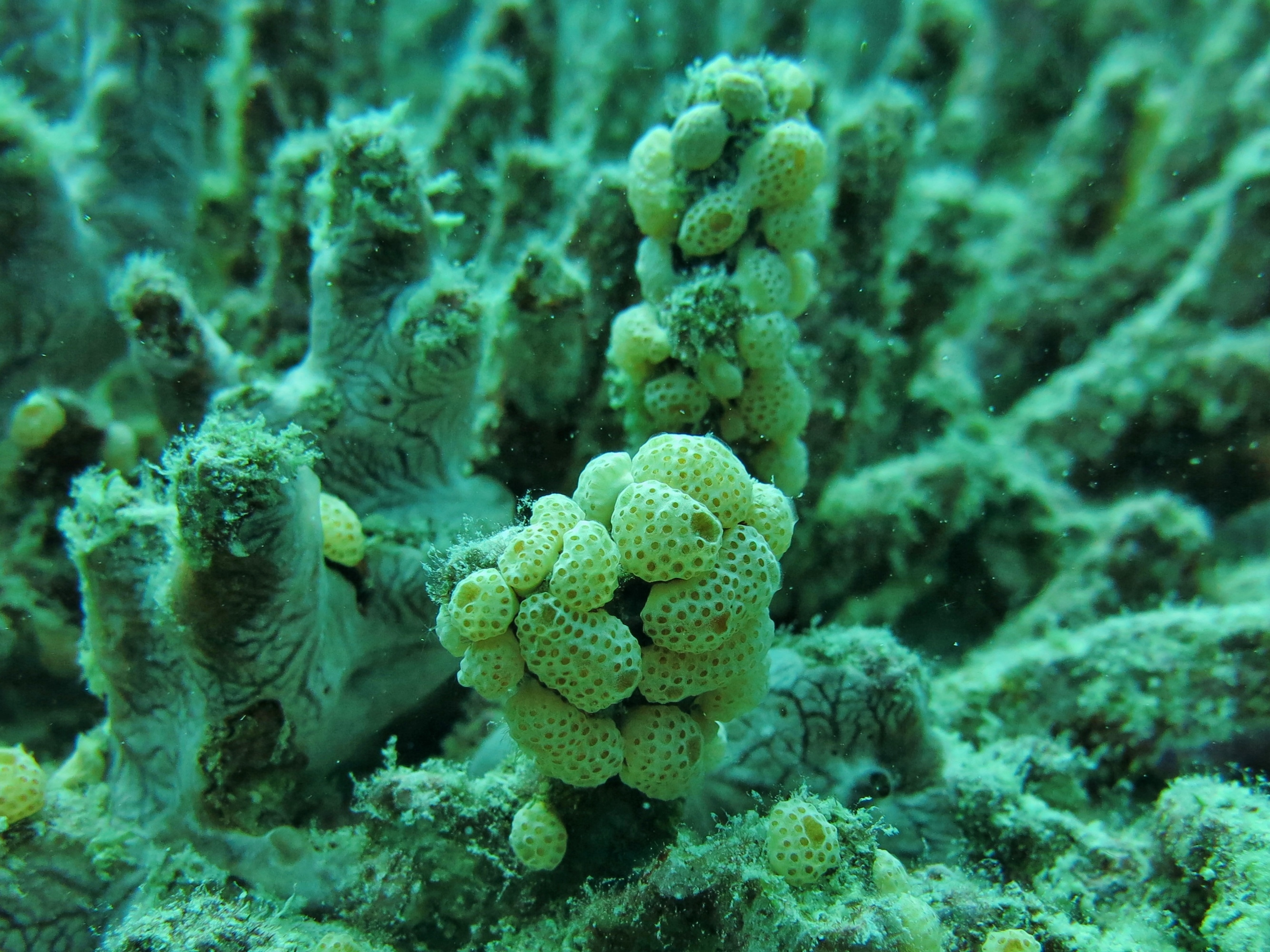
- Atriolum robustum

Scientific classification
- Domain: Eukaryota
- Kingdom: Animalia
- Phylum: Chordata
- Subphylum: Tunicata
- Class: Ascidiacea
- Order: Aplousobranchia
- Family: Didemnidae
- Genus: Atriolum; Kott, 1872

Species
- See text

= Atriolum =

Genus of sea squirts

Atriolum is a genus of colonial tunicates in the order Aplousobranchia, first described in 1983 by Patricia Kott. These are marine animals found attached to the seabed or some other surface.

== Species ==
The World Register of Marine Species lists the following species in the genus:

- Atriolum bucinum Kott, 2001
- Atriolum eversum Kott, 2001
- Atriolum glauerti (Michaelsen, 1930)
- Atriolum lilium Kott, 2001
- Atriolum marinense Kott, 2001
- Atriolum marsupialis Monniot, 1989
- Atriolum quadratum Monniot & Monniot, 1996
- Atriolum robustum Kott, 1983
- Atriolum tubiporum Kott, 2001
