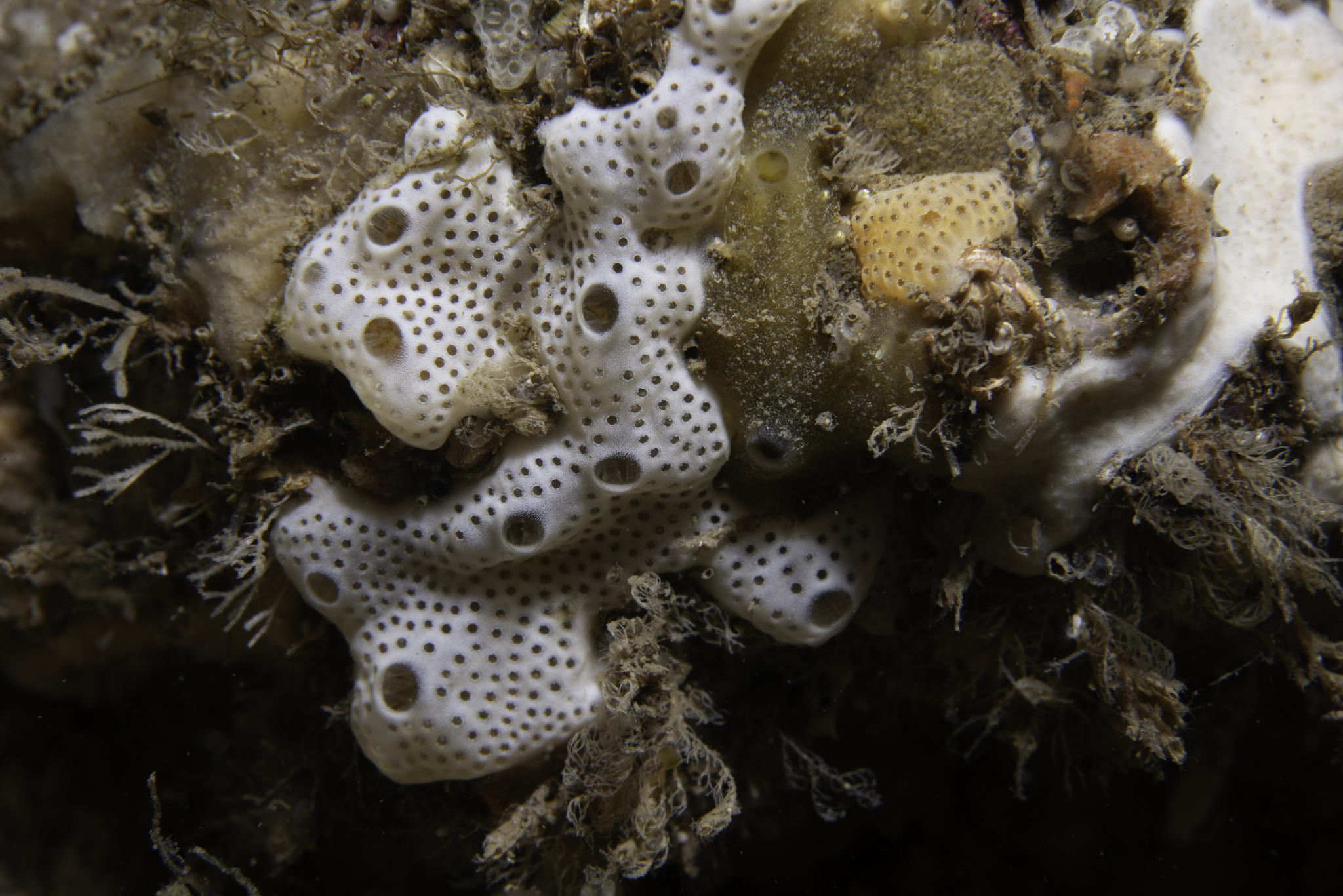

Scientific classification
- Domain: Eukaryota
- Kingdom: Animalia
- Phylum: Chordata
- Subphylum: Tunicata
- Class: Ascidiacea
- Order: Aplousobranchia
- Family: Didemnidae
- Genus: Lissoclinum
- Species: L. perforatum

Binomial name
- Lissoclinum perforatum (Giard, 1872)

= Lissoclinum perforatum =

Species of tunicate

Lissoclinum perforatum is a species of tunicate. The species was originally described by Alfred Mathieu Giard in 1872
