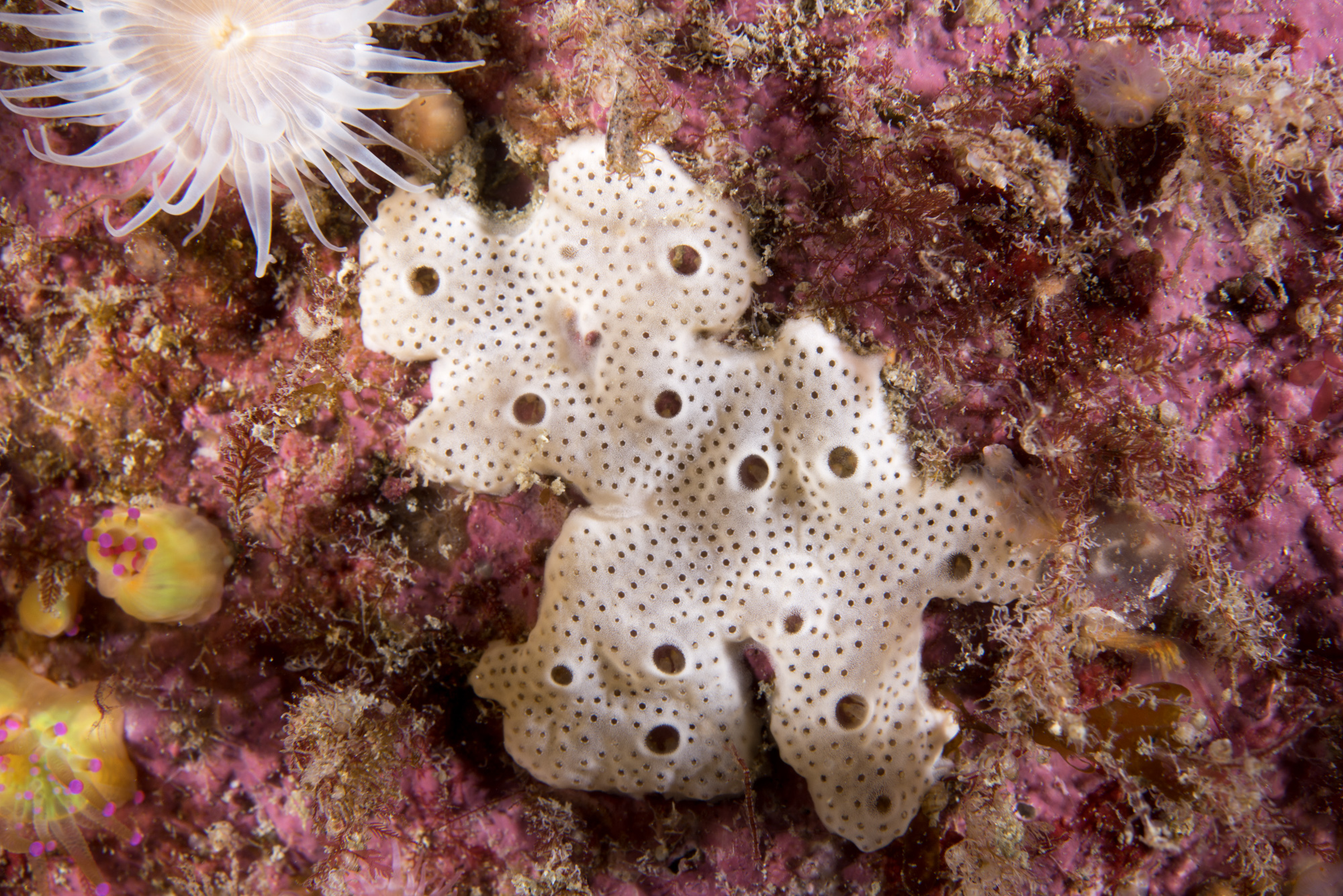

Scientific classification
- Domain: Eukaryota
- Kingdom: Animalia
- Phylum: Chordata
- Subphylum: Tunicata
- Class: Ascidiacea
- Order: Aplousobranchia
- Family: Didemnidae
- Genus: Lissoclinum; Verrill, 1871

Synonyms
- Echinoclinum Van Name, 1902; Polysoma Kott, 1983

= Lissoclinum =

Genus of tunicates

Lissoclinum is a genus of tunicates.

== Taxonomy ==
Lissoclinum contains the following species:

- Lissoclinum abdominale Monniot F., 1983
- Lissoclinum agriculum Kott, 2005
- Lissoclinum argyllense Millar, 1950
- Lissoclinum aureum Verrill, 1871
- Lissoclinum badium Monniot F. & Monniot C., 1996
- Lissoclinum bilobatum Millar, 1955
- Lissoclinum bistratum (Sluiter, 1905)
- Lissoclinum branchiatus (Buge & Monniot F., 1972)
- Lissoclinum caliginosum Kott, 2001
- Lissoclinum calycis Monniot F., 1992
- Lissoclinum capense (Hartmeyer, 1912)
- Lissoclinum capsulatum Kott, 2007
- Lissoclinum caulleryi (Ritter & Forsyth, 1917)
- Lissoclinum cavum Millar, 1962
- Lissoclinum clavatum Kott, 2005
- Lissoclinum coactum Kott, 2004
- Lissoclinum conchylium Kott, 2001
- Lissoclinum cornutum Monniot F., 1992
- Lissoclinum diversum Kott, 2004
- Lissoclinum durabile Kott, 2001
- Lissoclinum fragile (Van Name, 1902)
- Lissoclinum japonicum Tokioka, 1958
- Lissoclinum karenae Kott, 2005
- Lissoclinum laneum Kott, 2004
- Lissoclinum levitum Kott, 2001
- Lissoclinum limosum Kott, 2001
- Lissoclinum maculatum Kott, 2001
- Lissoclinum marpum Millar, 1953
- Lissoclinum mereti Monniot C. & Monniot F., 1987
- Lissoclinum midui Hirose & Hirose, 2011
- Lissoclinum multitestis Monniot F. & Monniot C., 1996
- Lissoclinum nebulosum Monniot F. & Monniot C., 1996
- Lissoclinum notti Brewin, 1958
- Lissoclinum ostrearium (Michaelsen, 1930)
- Lissoclinum pacificense (Kott, 1981)
- Lissoclinum panthera Monniot F. & Monniot C., 2008
- Lissoclinum patella (Gottschaldt, 1898)
- Lissoclinum perforatum (Giard, 1872)
- Lissoclinum polyorchis Monniot F., 1992
- Lissoclinum punctatum Kott, 1977
- Lissoclinum ravarava Monniot C. & Monniot F., 1987
- Lissoclinum reginum Kott, 2001
- Lissoclinum roseum Kott, 2001
- Lissoclinum rubrum Monniot F., 1975
- Lissoclinum scopulosum Kott, 2004
- Lissoclinum sente Kott, 2001
- Lissoclinum spongium Kott, 2001
- Lissoclinum stellatum Kott, 2004
- Lissoclinum taratara Monniot C. & Monniot F., 1987
- Lissoclinum tasmanense (Kott, 1954)
- Lissoclinum textile Monniot F. & Monniot C., 2001
- Lissoclinum textrinum Monniot F., 1992
- Lissoclinum timorense (Sluiter, 1909)
- Lissoclinum triangulum (Sluiter, 1909)
- Lissoclinum triforme (Sluiter, 1909)
- Lissoclinum tuheiavae Monniot C. & Monniot F., 1987
- Lissoclinum tumidum Monniot F. & Monniot C., 2008
- Lissoclinum tunicatum Monniot F. & Monniot C., 1996
- Lissoclinum vareau Monniot C. & Monniot F., 1987
- Lissoclinum variabile Kott, 2001
- Lissoclinum verrilli (Van Name, 1902)
- Lissoclinum vulgare Monniot F., 1992
- Lissoclinum wandeli Hartmeyer, 1924
- Lissoclinum weigelei Lafargue, 1968
