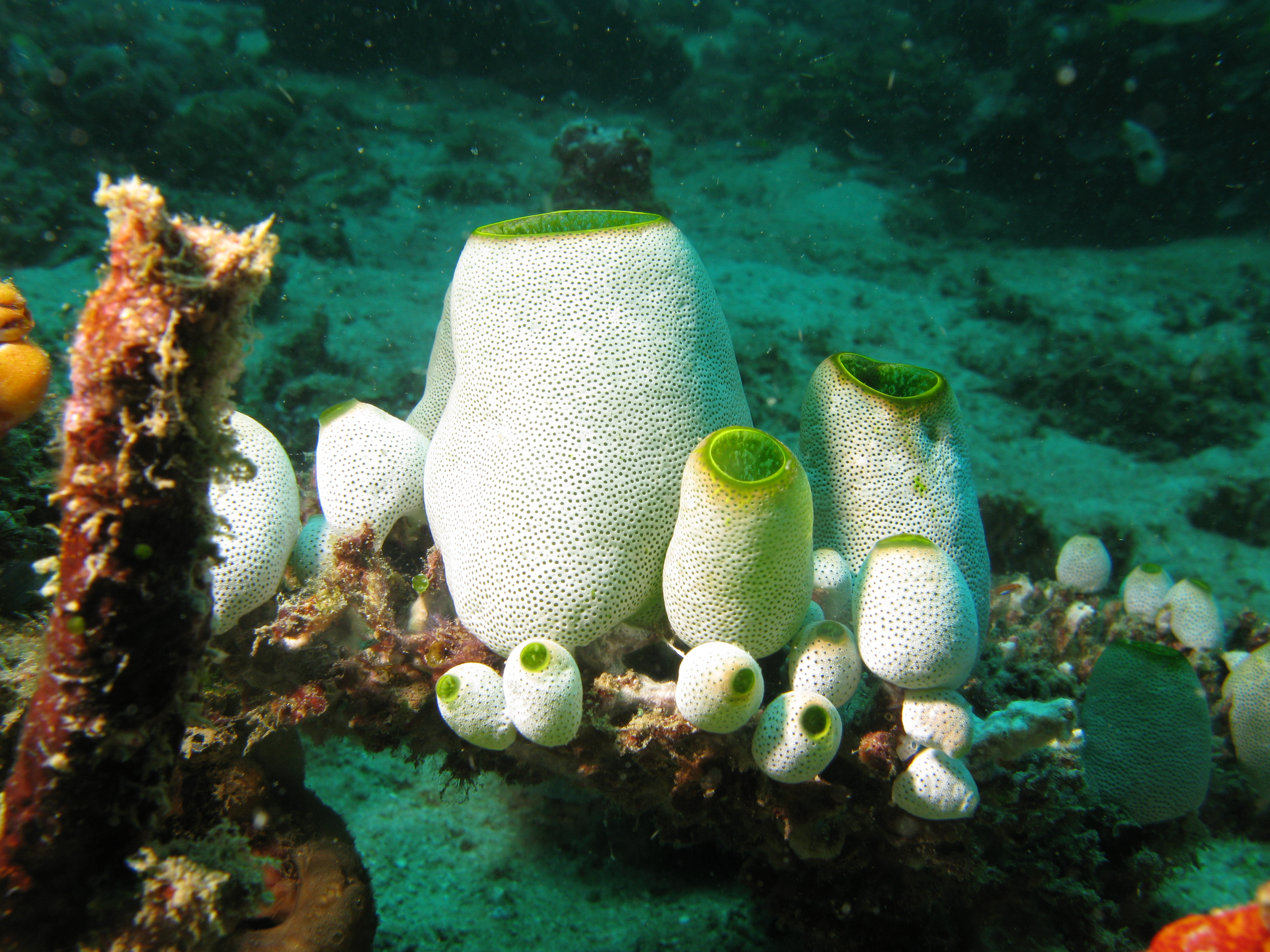
- A colony of Didemnum molle

Scientific classification
- Kingdom: Animalia
- Phylum: Chordata
- Subphylum: Tunicata
- Class: Ascidiacea
- Order: Aplousobranchia
- Family: Didemnidae
- Genus: Didemnum
- Species: D. molle

Binomial name
- Didemnum molle (Herdman, 1886)

Synonyms
- Didemnum sycon Michaelsen, 1920; Diplosomoides molle Herdman, 1886; Leptoclinum molle (Herdman, 1886); Lissoclinum molle (Herdman, 1886)

= Didemnum molle =

Species of sea squirt

Didemnum molle is a species of colonial tunicate in the family Didemnidae. It is commonly known as the tall urn ascidian, the green barrel sea squirt or the green reef sea-squirt. It is native to the Red Sea and the tropical waters of the Indo-Pacific region.

== Description ==
A colony of Didemnum molle is composed of a number of linked zooids adhering to the substrate. Each individual zooid has a plump, urn-shaped body with a diameter of up to 10 cm (4 in). The tunic (body wall) is made of a cellulose-like substance that is strong but flexible, and is perforated by numerous small holes, the buccal siphons, through which water is drawn into the body. At the top of the body is the large atrial siphon through which water flows out. The tunic is strengthened by the presence of many spherical calcareous spicules which are particularly concentrated round the neck of the urn. The colony is white, brown or green, or some combination of these colours. This hue is due to the symbiotic blue-green algae of the genus Prochloron present in the tissues. The tunic contains mycosporines which filter out ultra-violet radiation and protect the symbiotic cyanobacteria from damage in strong sunlight. In shallow water the colonies are small, the colour is more intense and there are more spicules present making the external surface bright white. At greater depths the colonies are larger, there are fewer spicules and the colour is more greyish or brownish. The tunic exudes large quantities of mucus which makes this species sticky to the touch. It is very similar to Atriolum robustum in appearance, especially young colonies, but can be distinguished by the mucus secretion and the network of canals connecting the thorax internally to the atrial siphon.

== Distribution ==
Didemnum molle is native to the western Indo-Pacific region where it is common and widely distributed. It grows on rock or dead coral on shallow reefs. In New Caledonia there is a green variant that grows direct onto sand.

== Biology ==
Didemnum molle is a suspension feeder. Water is drawn into the body of each zooid through the numerous buccal siphons, phytoplankton, zooplankton and fine organic particles are filtered out and the water is exhaled through the atrial siphon.

Asexual reproduction takes place by budding. A new bud will form and begin to actively feed while the zooid from which it emerged gradually regresses and is eventually re-adsorbed. Sexual reproduction also takes place. Each zooid is hermaphrodite and fertilisation takes place in the body cavity when a clutch of eggs is fertilised by sperm drawn in with the water stream. The embryos are brooded for a few days before the tadpole-like larvae are expelled into the water column. These quickly settle and cement themselves to suitable surfaces and start new colonies.
