= Geminicoccus =

Scientific classification
- Domain: Bacteria
- Kingdom: Pseudomonadati
- Phylum: Pseudomonadota
- Class: Alphaproteobacteria
- Order: Rhodospirillales
- Family: Geminicoccaceae
- Genus: Geminicoccus; Foesel et al. 2008

Type species
- Geminicoccus roseus

Species
- G. roseus

Genus of bacteria

Geminicoccus is a Gram-negative, and´strictly aerobic genus of bacteria from the family of Geminicoccaceae with one known species (Geminicoccus roseus). Geminicoccus roseus has been isolated from a biofilter from Rehovot in Israel.
