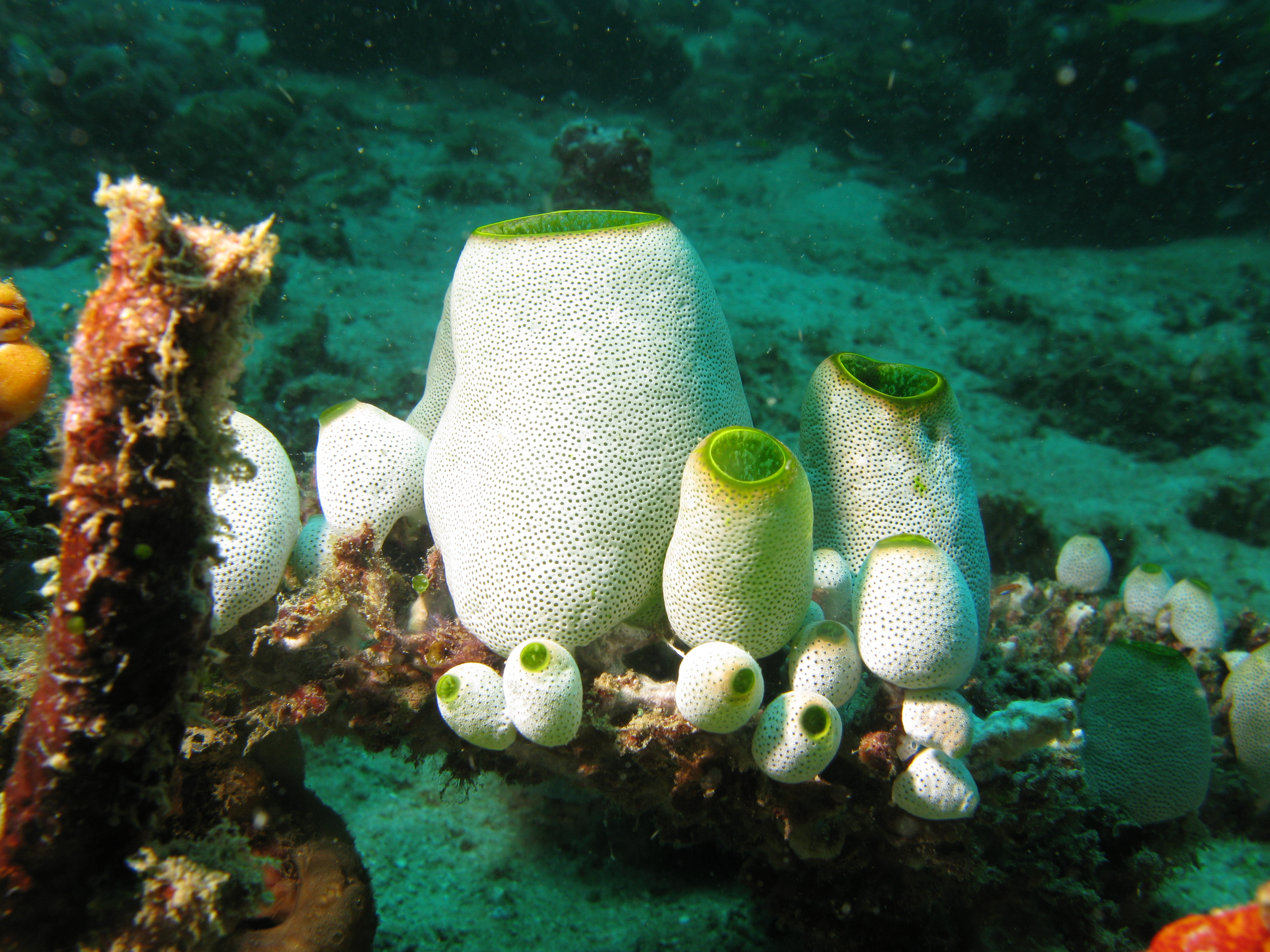
- Didemnum molle

Scientific classification
- Kingdom: Animalia
- Phylum: Chordata
- Subphylum: Tunicata
- Class: Ascidiacea
- Order: Aplousobranchia
- Family: Didemnidae
- Genus: Didemnum; Savigny, 1816

Synonyms
- List: Didemnium Savgny, 1816; Didemnoides Drasche, 1883; Diplosomoides Herdman, 1886; Hypurgon Sollas, 1903; Leptoclinum Milne Edwards, 1842; Sarcodidemnoides Oka & Willey, 1892; Tetradidemnum Della Valle, 1881

= Didemnum =

Genus of sea squirts

Didemnum is a genus of colonial tunicates in the family Didemnidae. It is the most speciose genus in the didemnid family. Species in this genus often have small calcareous spicules embedded in the tunic and form irregular or lobed colonies. Some Didemnum species, including Didemnum vexillum and Didemnum perlucidem are considered invasive species. In early 2006, Didemnum vexillum was found covering a 230 km^{2} area of cobble habitat in Georges Bank off the coast of New England, and is classified as an invasive species of greatest concern in coastal areas throughout Europe, New Zealand, and North America. Didemnum sp. invasions have also been recorded in Canada, the Mediterranean, and the Netherlands.

Species in this genus can be found in tropical or temperate regions. Some tropical species such as Didemnum molle have photosynthetic algae in their tunics.

== Species ==
The following species are recognised in the genus Didemnum:

- Didemnum abradatum Kott, 2007
- Didemnum ahu Monniot C. & Monniot F., 1987
- Didemnum albidum (Verrill, 1871)
- Didemnum albopunctatum Sluiter, 1909
- Didemnum algasedens Monniot F. & Monniot C., 2001
- Didemnum amethysteum (Van Name, 1902)
- Didemnum amourouxi Lafargue, 1976
- Didemnum apersum Tokioka, 1953
- Didemnum apuroto Monniot C. & Monniot F., 1987
- Didemnum arancium Kott, 2001
- Didemnum aratore Kott, 2004
- Didemnum asterix Kott, 2004
- Didemnum astrum Kott, 2001
- Didemnum augusti Michaelsen, 1920
- Didemnum aurantiacum Herdman, 1886
- Didemnum aurantium Rocha & Neves, 2015
- Didemnum aures Monniot C., Monniot F., Griffiths & Schleyer, 2001
- Didemnum bentarti Varela & Ramos-Esplá, 2008
- Didemnum beringense Romanov, 1977
- Didemnum biglans (Sluiter, 1906)
- Didemnum biglutinum Monniot F., 1995
- Didemnum bimasculum Monniot F., 1995
- Didemnum bisectatum Kott, 2001
- Didemnum brevioris Monniot F. & Monniot C., 1997
- Didemnum caesium Sluiter, 1909
- Didemnum calliginosum Monniot F., 1984
- Didemnum candidum Savigny, 1816
- Didemnum captivum Monniot F. & Monniot C., 1997
- Didemnum carnulentum Ritter & Forsyth, 1917
- Didemnum carpenteri (Herdman, 1886)
- Didemnum caudiculatum Romanov, 1989
- Didemnum cerebrale Michaelsen, 1920
- Didemnum chartaceum Sluiter, 1909
- Didemnum chilense Ärnbäck, 1929
- Didemnum cilicium Kott, 2005
- Didemnum cineraceum (Sluiter, 1898)
- Didemnum clavum Kott, 2001
- Didemnum coccineum (Drasche, 1883)
- Didemnum commune (Della Valle, 1877)
- Didemnum complexum Kott, 2001
- Didemnum conchyliatum (Sluiter, 1898)
- Didemnum congregatum Kott, 2004
- Didemnum contortum Monniot F. & Monniot C., 1997
- Didemnum coralliforme Kott, 2004
- Didemnum coriaceum (Drasche, 1883)
- Didemnum corium Kott, 2005
- Didemnum crescente Kott, 2001
- Didemnum cuculliferum (Sluiter, 1909)
- Didemnum cygnuus Kott, 2001
- Didemnum dealbatum Sluiter, 1909
- Didemnum delectum Kott, 2001
- Didemnum densum (Nott, 1892)
- Didemnum dicolla Monniot F. & Monniot C., 1997
- Didemnum diffundum Monniot F., 1995
- Didemnum digestum Sluiter, 1909
- Didemnum diversum Kott, 2004
- Didemnum dolium Kott, 2008
- Didemnum domesticum Kott, 2004
- Didemnum drachi Lafargue, 1975
- Didemnum duplicatum Monniot F., 1983
- Didemnum ectensum Romanov, 1989
- Didemnum edmondsoni Eldredge, 1967
- Didemnum edwardsi (Herdman, 1886)
- Didemnum effusium Kott, 2001
- Didemnum elikapekae Eldredge, 1967
- Didemnum elongatum Sluiter, 1909
- Didemnum epikelp Monniot C., Monniot F., Griffiths & Schleyer, 2001
- Didemnum etiolum Kott, 1982
- Didemnum extensum Romanov, 1989
- Didemnum fibriae Kott, 2004
- Didemnum filiforme Romanov, 1989
- Didemnum flagellatum Tokioka, 1953
- Didemnum flammacolor Rocha & Neves, 2015
- Didemnum flavoviride Monniot F., 1995
- Didemnum fragile Sluiter, 1909
- Didemnum fragum Kott, 2001
- Didemnum fucatum Sluiter, 1909
- Didemnum fulgens (Milne Edwards, 1841)
- Didemnum fuscum (Oka, 1931)
- Didemnum galacteum Lotufo & Dias, 2007
- Didemnum gayanae Sanamyan, 1999
- Didemnum gemmiparum Romanov, 1976
- Didemnum gigas (Della Valle, 1881)
- Didemnum gintonicum Eldredge, 1967
- Didemnum globiferum Monniot C., Monniot F., Griffiths & Schleyer, 2001
- Didemnum grande (Herdman, 1886)
- Didemnum granulatum Tokioka, 1954
- Didemnum granulosum (Drasche, 1883)
- Didemnum guttatum Monniot F. & Monniot C., 1996
- Didemnum halimedae Monniot F., 1983
- Didemnum helgolandicum Michaelsen, 1921
- Didemnum herba Kott, 2001
- Didemnum hiopaa Monniot C. & Monniot F., 1987
- Didemnum immundum Romanov, 1974
- Didemnum inaequilobatum Daumezon, 1908
- Didemnum inauratum Monniot F., 1983
- Didemnum incanum (Herdman, 1899)
- Didemnum inveteratum Kott, 2001
- Didemnum japonicum (Herdman, 1886)
- Didemnum jedanense Sluiter, 1909
- Didemnum jeffreysi (Herdman, 1886)
- Didemnum jucundum Kott, 2001
- Didemnum karlae Michaelsen, 1920
- Didemnum kelleri Michaelsen, 1923
- Didemnum kurilense Romanov, 1989
- Didemnum lacertosum Monniot F., 1995
- Didemnum lacustre Monniot F. & Monniot C., 2008
- Didemnum lahillei Hartmeyer, 1909
- Didemnum lambertae Rocha & Neves, 2015
- Didemnum lambitum (Sluiter, 1900)
- Didemnum leopardi Monniot C., Monniot F., Griffiths & Schleyer, 2001
- Didemnum leopardum Kott, 2005
- Didemnum levitas Kott, 2001
- Didemnum ligulum Monniot F., 1983
- Didemnum lillipution Kott, 2004
- Didemnum linatum Kott, 2001
- Didemnum linguiferum Monniot F. & Monniot C., 1996
- Didemnum lissoclinum Kott, 2001
- Didemnum lithostrotum Brewin, 1956
- Didemnum longigaster Rocha & Neves, 2015
- Didemnum lutarium Van Name, 1910
- Didemnum macrosiphonium Kott, 2001
- Didemnum macrospiculatum Tokioka, 1967
- Didemnum maculatum (Nott, 1892)
- Didemnum maculosum (Milne Edwards, 1841)
- Didemnum madagascariense Brunetti, 2007
- Didemnum madeleinae Monniot F. & Monniot C., 2001
- Didemnum magnetae Hastings, 1931
- Didemnum mantile Kott, 2001
- Didemnum megaductus Romanov, 1974
- Didemnum megasterix Monniot F., 1995
- Didemnum mekeald Monniot F. & Monniot C., 2008
- Didemnum membranaceum Sluiter, 1909
- Didemnum mesembrinum Monniot C., Monniot F., Griffiths & Schleyer, 2001
- Didemnum microthoracicum Kott, 2001
- Didemnum millari Monniot C., Monniot F., Griffiths & Schleyer, 2001
- Didemnum minisculum Kott, 2001
- Didemnum minispirale Romanov, 1989
- Didemnum misakiense (Oka & Willey, 1892)
- Didemnum molle (Herdman, 1886)
- Didemnum monile Kott, 2001
- Didemnum montosum Sluiter, 1909
- Didemnum moseleyi (Herdman, 1886)
- Didemnum multiampullae Kott, 2008
- Didemnum multispirale Kott, 2001
- Didemnum mutabile Monniot C. & Monniot F., 1987
- Didemnum nambucciensis Kott, 2004
- Didemnum neglectum Herdman, 1886
- Didemnum nekozita Tokioka, 1967
- Didemnum nigricans Monniot F., 1995
- Didemnum nigrum Monniot F. & Monniot C., 1996
- Didemnum nivale Monniot F. & Monniot C., 2008
- Didemnum nocturnum Monniot F. & Monniot C., 1997
- Didemnum oblitum Kott, 2001
- Didemnum obscurum Monniot F., 1969
- Didemnum ossium Kott, 2001
- Didemnum paa Monniot C. & Monniot F., 1987
- Didemnum pacificum Tokioka, 1953
- Didemnum papillatum Romanov, 1974
- Didemnum parancium Kott, 2001
- Didemnum parau Monniot C. & Monniot F., 1987
- Didemnum pardum Tokioka, 1962
- Didemnum partitum Tokioka, 1953
- Didemnum parvum Monniot F. & Monniot C., 2003
- Didemnum patulum (Herdman, 1899)
- Didemnum pecten Kott, 2001
- Didemnum pellucidum Kott, 2001
- Didemnum perlucidum Monniot F., 1983
- Didemnum perplexum Kott, 2001
- Didemnum perspicuum Giard, 1873
- Didemnum peyrefittense Brément, 1913
- Didemnum pica Brunetti, 2007
- Didemnum pitipiri Monniot C. & Monniot F., 1987
- Didemnum plebeium Kott, 2005
- Didemnum poecilomorpha Monniot F. & Monniot C., 1996
- Didemnum polare Hartmeyer, 1903
- Didemnum precocinum Kott, 2001
- Didemnum protectum (Daumézon, 1908)
- Didemnum psammatodes (Sluiter, 1895)
- Didemnum pseudobiglans Romanov, 1989
- Didemnum pseudofulgens Médioni, 1970
- Didemnum pseudovexillum Turon & Viard, 2020
- Didemnum quincunciale Michaelsen, 1920
- Didemnum recurvatum Sluiter, 1909
- Didemnum risirense Nishikawa, 1990
- Didemnum roberti Michaelsen, 1930
- Didemnum rochai Paiva et al., 2015
- Didemnum rodriguesi Rocha & Monniot F., 1993
- Didemnum romssae Marks, 1996
- Didemnum roseum Sars, 1851
- Didemnum rota Kott, 2004
- Didemnum rottnesti Kott, 1962
- Didemnum rubeum Monniot F. & Monniot C., 1996
- Didemnum sachalinense Romanov, 1989
- Didemnum sanakiensis Sanamyan, 1999
- Didemnum santaelenae Van Name, 1945
- Didemnum scopi Kott, 2001
- Didemnum semifuscum Sluiter, 1909
- Didemnum siphonale Tokioka, 1967
- Didemnum sordidum Kott, 2001
- Didemnum spadix Kott, 2001
- Didemnum speciosum (Herdman, 1886)
- Didemnum sphaericum Tokioka, 1967
- Didemnum spongioides Sluiter, 1909
- Didemnum spumante Kott, 2004
- Didemnum spumosum Kott, 2004
- Didemnum stercoratum Monniot F. & Monniot C., 1996
- Didemnum stilense Michaelsen, 1934
- Didemnum stragulum Kott, 2001
- Didemnum studeri Hartmeyer, 1911
- Didemnum subflavum (Herdman, 1886)
- Didemnum subtile Monniot F. & Monniot C., 2008
- Didemnum sucosum Kott, 2001
- Didemnum tabulatum Sluiter, 1909
- Didemnum tantulum Kott, 2007
- Didemnum tapetum Kott, 2008
- Didemnum tenue (Herdman, 1886)
- Didemnum ternerratum Kott, 2001
- Didemnum tetrahedrum Dias & Rodrigues, 2004
- Didemnum theca Kott, 2001
- Didemnum thomsoni Herdman, 1886
- Didemnum tigrinoides Tokioka, 1953
- Didemnum toafene Monniot C. & Monniot F., 1987
- Didemnum tonga (Herdman, 1886)
- Didemnum torresii (Sluiter, 1895)
- Didemnum tortile Monniot F. & Monniot C., 2008
- Didemnum translucidum Tokioka, 1953
- Didemnum transparentum Romanov, 1977
- Didemnum trispirale Romanov, 1989
- Didemnum tuberatum (Nott, 1892)
- Didemnum tumulatum Kott, 2004
- Didemnum usitatum Kott, 2004
- Didemnum uturoa Monniot C. & Monniot F., 1987
- Didemnum vahatuio Monniot C. & Monniot F., 1987
- Didemnum valgum Monniot F. & Monniot C., 2008
- Didemnum vanderhorsti Van Name, 1924
- Didemnum velans Michaelsen, 1920
- Didemnum velum Kott, 2008
- Didemnum verdantum Kott, 2001
- Didemnum vermiforme Romanov, 1989
- Didemnum vesica Kott, 2007
- Didemnum vesperi Kott, 2004
- Didemnum vexillum Kott, 2002
- Didemnum via Kott, 2001
- Didemnum viride (Herdman, 1906)
- Didemnum vulgare Kott, 2001
- Didemnum yolky Monniot C. & Monniot F., 1997

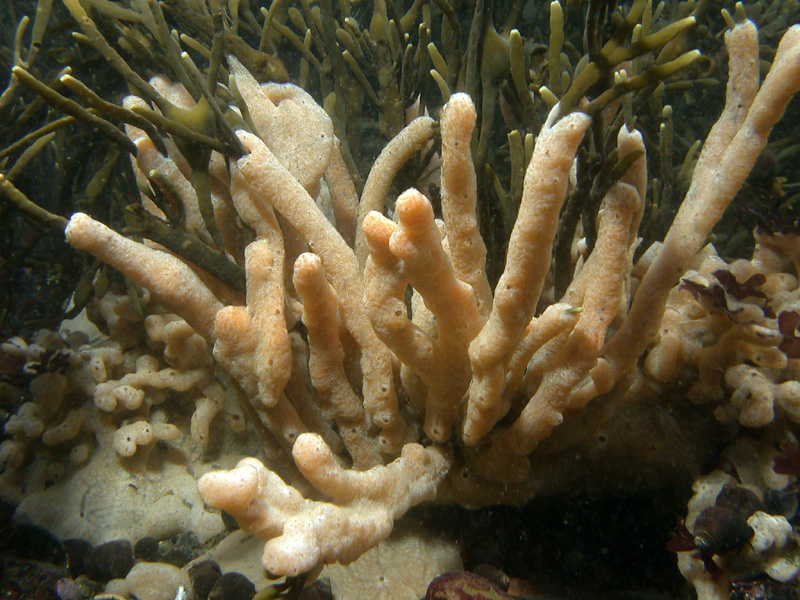
Tunicate colonies of Didemnum sp. overgrowing the fronds of dark green algae. These colonies can quickly overgrow most surfaces and other organisms.
