= Defluviicoccus =

Scientific classification
- Domain: Bacteria
- Kingdom: Pseudomonadati
- Phylum: Pseudomonadota
- Class: Alphaproteobacteria
- Order: Rhodospirillales
- Family: Geminicoccaceae
- Genus: Defluviicoccus corrig. Maszenan et al. 2005

Type species
- Defluviicoccus vanus

Species
- "Candidatus Defluviicoccus seviourii" Onetto et al. 2019; "Candidatus Defluviicoccus tetraformis" Nobu et al. 2014; Defluviicoccus vanus corrig. Maszenan et al. 2005

Synonyms
- Defluvicoccus Maszenan et al. 2005

Genus of bacteria

Defluviicoccus is a genus in the phylum Pseudomonadota (Bacteria).

== Etymology ==
The name Defluviicoccus derives from:
Latin noun defluvium, sewage; and coccus (from Greek kokkos (κόκκος), grain, seed), coccus; Defluviicoccus, a coccus from sewage.

== Species ==
The genus contains a single valid species, namely D. vanus (corrig. Maszenan et al. 2005, (type species of the genus).; Latin vanus, empty, idle, referring to its staining behaviour.)

== See also ==
- Bacterial taxonomy
- Microbiology
