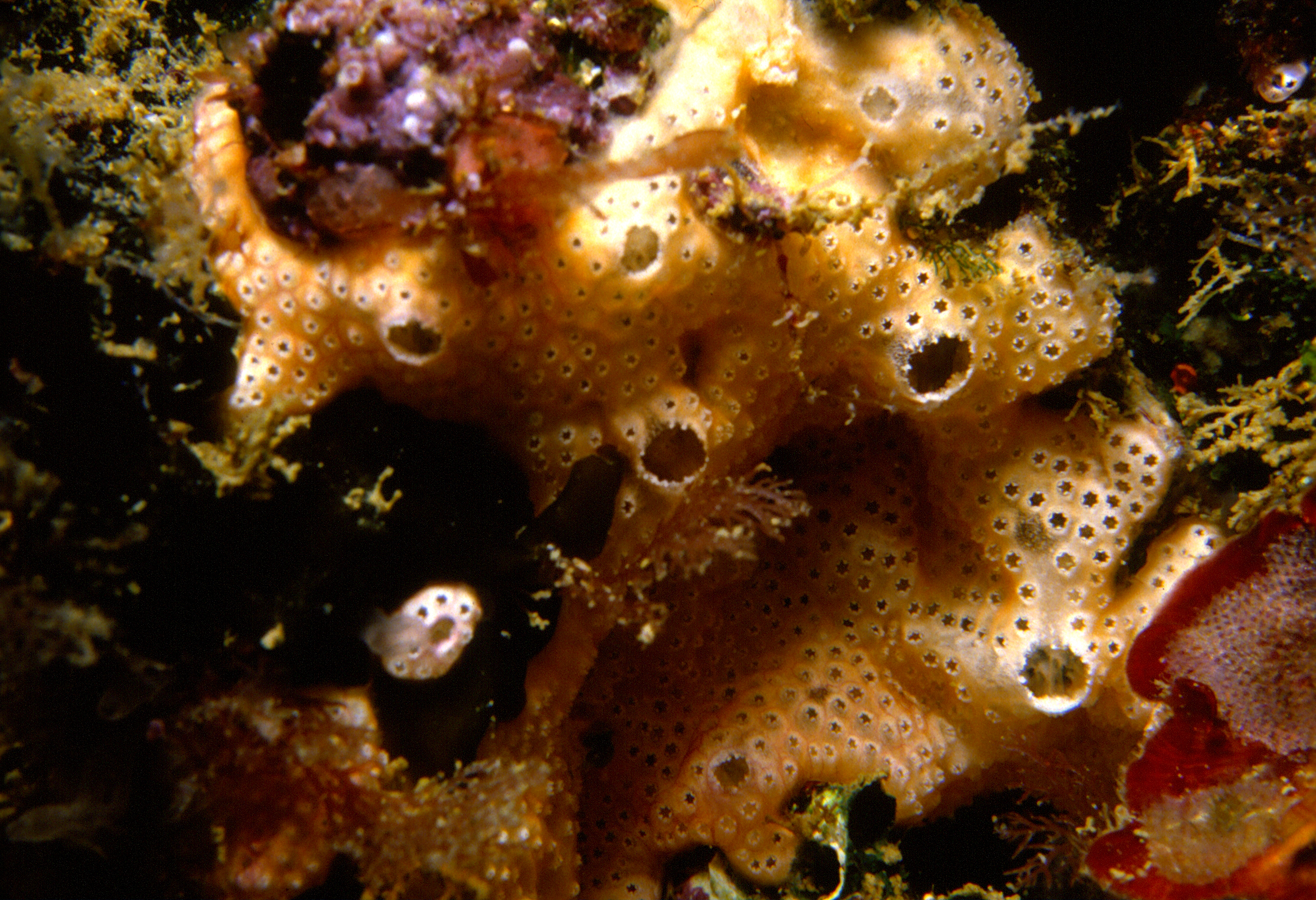
- Polysyncraton bilobatum

Scientific classification
- Kingdom: Animalia
- Phylum: Chordata
- Subphylum: Tunicata
- Class: Ascidiacea
- Order: Aplousobranchia
- Family: Didemnidae
- Genus: Polysyncraton; Nott, 1892

= Polysyncraton =

Genus of sea squirts

Polysyncraton is a genus of tunicates belonging to the family Didemnidae.

The genus has almost cosmopolitan distribution.

== Morphology Characteristics ==
This genus is known to possess Large thoraxes, large atrial languets, lateral thoracic organs typically found in the anterior region, more than three testis follicle, five or fewer sperm duct coils, and large gemmiparous larvae with over six pairs of ectodermal ampullae.

Species:

- Polysyncraton adelon Monniot F. & Monniot C., 2001
- Polysyncraton adenale Romanov, 1977
- Polysyncraton alinguum Kott, 2004
- Polysyncraton amethysteum Van Name, 1902
- Polysyncraton arafurensis (Tokioka, 1952)
- Polysyncraton arvum Kott, 2004
- Polysyncraton asperum Romanov, 1989
- Polysyncraton aspiculatum (Tokioka, 1949)
- Polysyncraton asterix Monniot F., 1974
- Polysyncraton bilobatum Lafargue, 1968
- Polysyncraton cabofriense Oliveira & Rocha, 2019
- Polysyncraton calculum Kott, 2008
- Polysyncraton canetense (Brément, 1913)
- Polysyncraton catillum Kott, 2004
- Polysyncraton cerebellum Monniot F. & Monniot C., 2001
- Polysyncraton chondrilla (Michaelsen, 1924)
- Polysyncraton chuni Hartmeyer, 1912
- Polysyncraton circulum Kott, 1962
- Polysyncraton crassum Redikorzev, 1913
- Polysyncraton cuculliferum (Sluiter, 1909)
- Polysyncraton dealbatum Kott, 2008
- Polysyncraton dentatum Kott, 2001
- Polysyncraton discoides Kott, 1962
- Polysyncraton doboense (Sluiter, 1913)
- Polysyncraton dromide Kott, 2001
- Polysyncraton fadeevi Romanov, 1989
- Polysyncraton fistulum Kott, 2008
- Polysyncraton flammeum Kott, 2001
- Polysyncraton fuscum Nott, 1892
- Polysyncraton galaxum Kott, 2004
- Polysyncraton glaucum Kott, 2001
- Polysyncraton globosum Oliveira & Rocha, 2019
- Polysyncraton gratum Kott, 2007
- Polysyncraton haranti Lafargue, 1975
- Polysyncraton hartmeyeri Michaelsen, 1923
- Polysyncraton horridum Monniot & Monniot, 2008
- Polysyncraton infundibulum Kott, 2001
- Polysyncraton jugosum (Herdman & Riddell, 1913)
- Polysyncraton kashenkoi Romanov, 1989
- Polysyncraton krylatkae Romanov, 1974
- Polysyncraton lacazei (Giard, 1872)
- Polysyncraton linere Kott, 2004
- Polysyncraton lithostrotum (Brewin, 1956)
- Polysyncraton lodix Kott, 2001
- Polysyncraton longitubis Kott, 2004
- Polysyncraton louminae Monniot F., 1984
- Polysyncraton luteum Kott, 2004
- Polysyncraton magnetae Hastings, 1931
- Polysyncraton magnilarvum (Millar, 1962)
- Polysyncraton marmoratum Sluiter, 1909
- Polysyncraton maurizeliae Paiva et al., 2015
- Polysyncraton meandratum Monniot F., 1993
- Polysyncraton milleporae Vasseur, 1969
- Polysyncraton miniastrum Kott, 2004
- Polysyncraton montanum Kott, 2004
- Polysyncraton mortenseni (Michaelsen, 1924)
- Polysyncraton multiforme Kott, 2001
- Polysyncraton multipapillae Monniot F., 1993
- Polysyncraton nigropunctatum Sluiter, 1909
- Polysyncraton niveum Kott, 2004
- Polysyncraton oceanium Kott, 2001
- Polysyncraton orbiculum Kott, 1962
- Polysyncraton otuetue Monniot C. & Monniot F., 1987
- Polysyncraton palliolum Kott, 2001
- Polysyncraton papyrus Kott, 2001
- Polysyncraton paradoxum Nott, 1892
- Polysyncraton paramushiri Romanov, 1989
- Polysyncraton pavimentum Monniot F., 1993
- Polysyncraton pedunculatum Kott, 2001
- Polysyncraton peristroma Kott, 2004
- Polysyncraton polysystema Kott, 2005
- Polysyncraton pontoniae Monniot C. & Monniot F., 1987
- Polysyncraton poro Monniot C. & Monniot F., 1987
- Polysyncraton pseudomagnetae Kott, 2004
- Polysyncraton pseudorugosum Monniot F., 1993
- Polysyncraton pulchrum Kott, 2001
- Polysyncraton purou Monniot C. & Monniot F., 1987
- Polysyncraton recurvatum (Sluiter, 1909)
- Polysyncraton reedi Monniot C. & Monniot F., 1994
- Polysyncraton regulum Kott, 2001
- Polysyncraton reticulum Kott, 2004
- Polysyncraton rica Kott, 2001
- Polysyncraton robustum Kott, 2001
- Polysyncraton rostrum Monniot F. & Monniot C., 1997
- Polysyncraton rubitapum Kott, 2001
- Polysyncraton rugosum Monniot F., 1993
- Polysyncraton sagamiana (Tokioka, 1953)
- Polysyncraton scobinum Kott, 2001
- Polysyncraton scorteum Kott, 2001
- Polysyncraton shellensis Brunetti, 2007
- Polysyncraton sideris Kott, 2001
- Polysyncraton snelliusi Oliveira & Rocha, 2019
- Polysyncraton spongioides Hartmeyer, 1912
- Polysyncraton tasmanense Kott, 2001
- Polysyncraton tegetum Kott, 2001
- Polysyncraton tenuicutis Kott, 2001
- Polysyncraton textus Kott, 2004
- Polysyncraton thallomorpha Monniot F., 1993
- Polysyncraton tokiokai Romanov, 1989
- Polysyncraton trivolutum (Millar, 1960)
- Polysyncraton turris Kott, 2004
- Polysyncraton vestiens Monniot F. & Monniot C., 2001
- Polysyncraton victoriensis Kott, 1976
