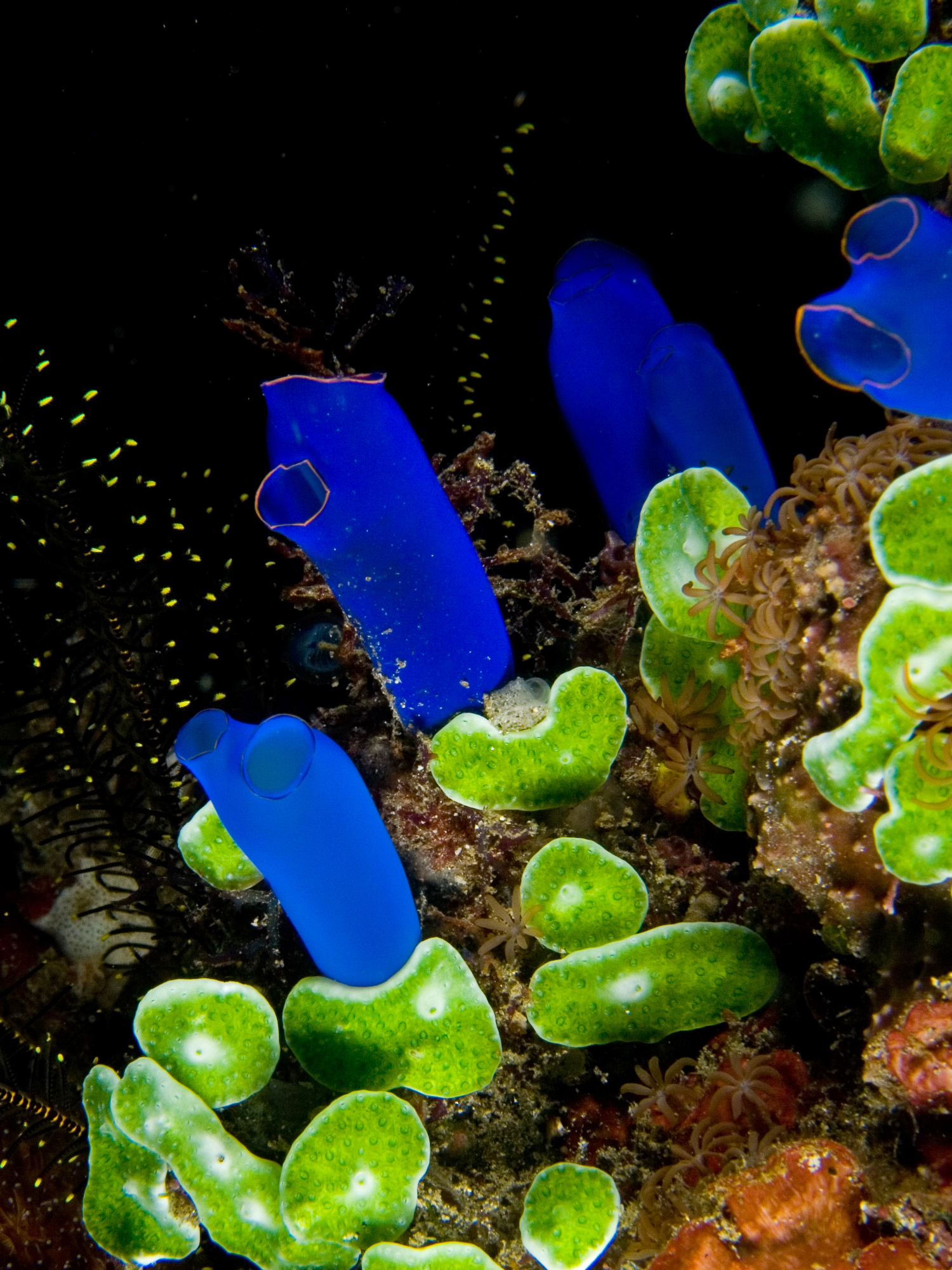

Scientific classification
- Domain: Eukaryota
- Kingdom: Animalia
- Phylum: Chordata
- Subphylum: Tunicata
- Class: Ascidiacea
- Order: Aplousobranchia
- Family: Didemnidae
- Genus: Diplosoma; Macdonald, 1859

= Diplosoma (tunicate) =

Genus of sea squirts

Diplosoma is a genus of tunicates belonging to the family Didemnidae.

The genus has cosmopolitan distribution.

== Species ==
Species:

- Diplosoma abbotti Eldredge, 1967
- Diplosoma aggregatum Hirose & Hirose, 2009
- Diplosoma antarcticum Kott, 1969
- Diplosoma ata Monniot C. & Monniot F., 1987
- Diplosoma carnosum Drasche, 1883
- Diplosoma citrinum Rocha & Gamba, 2015
- Diplosoma fecundum Kott, 2004
- Diplosoma gelatinosa (Milne Edwards, 1841)
- Diplosoma gemmifera Thiel, 1938
- Diplosoma glandulosum Monniot F., 1983
- Diplosoma gumavirens Hirose & Oka, 2009
- Diplosoma handi Eldredge, 1967
- Diplosoma hitatti Eldredge, 1967
- Diplosoma lafargueae Vazquez, 1993
- Diplosoma listerianum (Milne Edwards, 1841)
- Diplosoma longinquum (Sluiter, 1912)
- Diplosoma lukini Romanov, 1989
- Diplosoma marsupiale Monniot F. & Monniot C., 2001
- Diplosoma matie Monniot C. & Monniot F., 1987
- Diplosoma migrans (Menker & Ax, 1970)
- Diplosoma modestum Michaelsen, 1920
- Diplosoma multifidum (Sluiter, 1909)
- Diplosoma multipapillata Kott, 1980
- Diplosoma multitestis Monniot F. & Monniot C., 1996
- Diplosoma ooru Hirose & Suetsugu, 2005
- Diplosoma pannosum Monniot F. & Monniot C., 2001
- Diplosoma ponticum Romanov, 1989
- Diplosoma purpurea Sluiter, 1898
- Diplosoma redika Monniot F., 1994
- Diplosoma simile (Sluiter, 1909)
- Diplosoma simileguwa Oka & Hirose, 2005
- Diplosoma singulare Lafargue, 1968
- Diplosoma siphonale Romanov, 1977
- Diplosoma spongiforme (Giard, 1872)
- Diplosoma translucidum (Hartmeyer, 1909)
- Diplosoma tritestis Monniot F., 1984
- Diplosoma unitestis Monniot F. & Monniot C., 2001
- Diplosoma variostigmatum Hirose & Oka, 2008
- Diplosoma velatum Kott, 2001
- Diplosoma versicolor Monniot F., 1994
- Diplosoma virens (Hartmeyer, 1909)
- Diplosoma viscosum (Savigny, 1816)
- Diplosoma watanabei Hirose E., Oka & Hirose M., 2009
