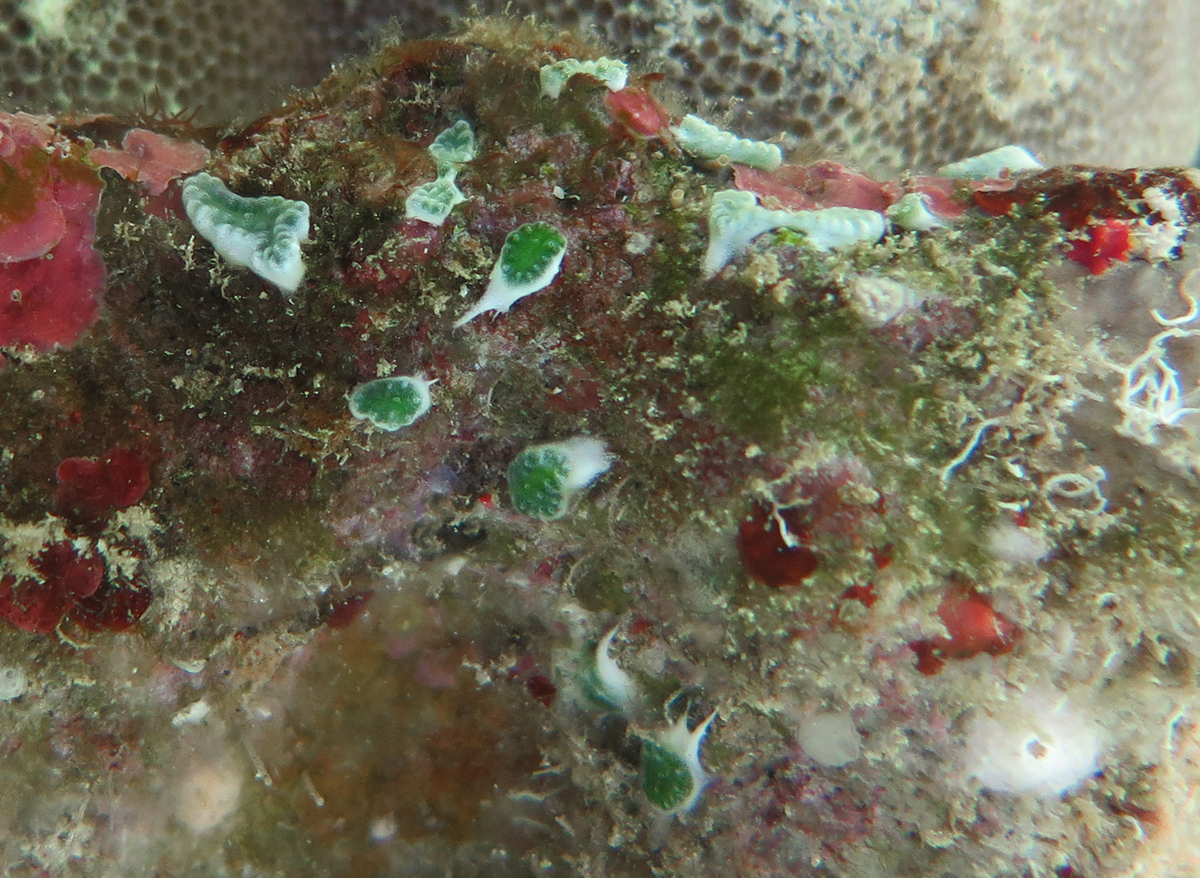
- Trididemnum cyclops

Scientific classification
- Domain: Eukaryota
- Kingdom: Animalia
- Phylum: Chordata
- Subphylum: Tunicata
- Class: Ascidiacea
- Order: Aplousobranchia
- Family: Didemnidae
- Genus: Trididemnum; Della Valle, 1881

= Trididemnum =

Genus of tunicates

Trididemnum is a genus of tunicates belonging to the family Didemnidae.

The genus has cosmopolitan distribution.

== Species ==
Species:

- Trididemnum alexi Lambert, 2003
- Trididemnum alleni Berrill, 1947
- Trididemnum amiculum Kott, 2001
- Trididemnum areolatum (Herdman, 1906)
- Trididemnum auriculatum Michaelsen, 1919
- Trididemnum banneri Eldredge, 1967
- Trididemnum caelatum Kott, 2001
- Trididemnum cerebriforme Hartmeyer, 1913
- Trididemnum cereum (Giard, 1872)
- Trididemnum clinides Kott, 1977
- Trididemnum cristatum Kott, 2001
- Trididemnum cyanophorum Lafargue & Duclaux, 1979
- Trididemnum cyclops Michaelsen, 1921
- Trididemnum delesseriae Lafargue, 1968
- Trididemnum discrepans (Sluiter, 1909)
- Trididemnum dispersum (Sluiter, 1909)
- Trididemnum erythraeum Michaelsen, 1923
- Trididemnum farrago Kott, 2004
- Trididemnum fetia Monniot C. & Monniot F., 1987
- Trididemnum grandistellatum Kott, 2008
- Trididemnum granosum Sluiter, 1909
- Trididemnum hians Monniot F., 1983
- Trididemnum inarmatum (Drasche, 1883)
- Trididemnum lanugineum Monniot F., 2010
- Trididemnum lapidosum Kott, 2001
- Trididemnum maragogi Rocha, 2002
- Trididemnum maratuae Monniot & Monniot, 2008
- Trididemnum marmoratum (Sluiter, 1909)
- Trididemnum mellitum Kott, 2005
- Trididemnum meridionale Millar, 1953
- Trididemnum microzoa (Redikorzev, 1913)
- Trididemnum miniatum Kott, 1977
- Trididemnum natalense Michaelsen, 1920
- Trididemnum nebula Kott, 2007
- Trididemnum nobile Kott, 2001
- Trididemnum nubilum Kott, 1980
- Trididemnum nubis Monniot F., 1991
- Trididemnum opacum (Ritter, 1907)
- Trididemnum orbiculatum (Van Name, 1902)
- Trididemnum palmae Monniot F., 1984
- Trididemnum paraclinides Kott, 1982
- Trididemnum paracyclops Kott, 1980
- Trididemnum pedunculatum Lafargue, Ramos-Espla, Buencuerpo & Vazquez, 1993
- Trididemnum pigmentatum Kott, 2001
- Trididemnum planum Sluiter, 1909
- Trididemnum polyorchis Monniot F. & Monniot C., 1996
- Trididemnum poma Monniot F. & Monniot C., 2001
- Trididemnum profundum (Sluiter, 1909)
- Trididemnum propinquum (Herdman, 1886)
- Trididemnum pseudodiplosoma (Kott, 1962)
- Trididemnum pusillum Kott, 2004
- Trididemnum reticulatum Kott, 2004
- Trididemnum rocasensis Paiva et al., 2015
- Trididemnum roseum Plante & Vasseur, 1966
- Trididemnum sansibaricum (Michaelsen, 1920)
- Trididemnum savignii (Herdman, 1886)
- Trididemnum shawi Page, Willis & Handley, 2014
- Trididemnum sibogae (Hartmeyer, 1910)
- Trididemnum sluiteri Brewin, 1958
- Trididemnum solidum (Van Name, 1902)
- Trididemnum spiculatum Kott, 1962
- Trididemnum spongia Monniot F., 1991
- Trididemnum spumosum Kott, 2001
- Trididemnum strangulatum (Ritter, 1901)
- Trididemnum strigosum Kott, 1980
- Trididemnum tectum Kott, 2001
- Trididemnum tenerum (Verrill, 1871)
- Trididemnum thetidis Van Name, 1945
- Trididemnum titanium Kott, 2007
- Trididemnum tomarahi Monniot C. & Monniot F., 1987
- Trididemnum translucidum (Lafargue, 1968)
- Trididemnum vahaereere Monniot C. & Monniot F., 1987
- Trididemnum vermiforme Kott, 2001
- Trididemnum vostoki Romanov, 1989
