= Geminicoccaceae =

Scientific classification
- Domain: Bacteria
- Kingdom: Pseudomonadati
- Phylum: Pseudomonadota
- Class: Alphaproteobacteria
- Order: Rhodospirillales
- Family: Geminicoccaceae; Proença et al. 2018

Genera
- Arboricoccus corrig. Proença et al. 2018; Defluviicoccus corrig. Maszenan et al. 2005; Geminicoccus Foesel et al. 2008; Tistrella Shi et al. 2003

Family of bacteria

Geminicoccaceae is a family of bacteria from the order Rhodospirillales.
