= Didemnin =

Cyclic molecule found in tunicates

Structure of Didemnins A-C

Didemnins are cyclic depsipeptide compounds isolated from a tunicate (ascidian, or sea-squirt) of the genus Trididemnum (family of Didemnidæ) that were collected in the Caribbean Sea. They were first isolated in 1978 at the University of Illinois.

Although more than nine didemnins (didemnins A-E, G, X and Y) have been isolated from the extract of Trididemnum solidum, didemnin B is the one that possesses the most potent biological activities. It is a strong antiviral agent against both DNA and RNA viruses such as herpes simplex virus type 1, a strong immunosuppressant that shows some potential in skin graft and is also very cytotoxic. It shows strong activity against murine leukemia cells. Large amounts of didemnin B were chemically synthesized and it was advanced to clinical trials by the National Cancer Institute. It has completed phase II human clinical trials against adenocarcinoma of the kidney, advanced epithelial ovarian cancer, and metastatic breast cancer. Unfortunately, the compound exhibited high toxicity through a high incidence of anaphylactic reactions in patients and trials were terminated.

The didemnin analog plitidepsin was in phase II clinical trials as of 2003.

== Biosynthesis ==
The biosynthesis of depsipeptide Didemnin is governed by a hybrid non-ribosomal peptide synthetase-polyketide synthetase (NRPS-PKS) pathway. The didemnin mega-synthetase consists of 10 proteins, of which 8 NRPS and 2 PKS, covering 13 modules in total.

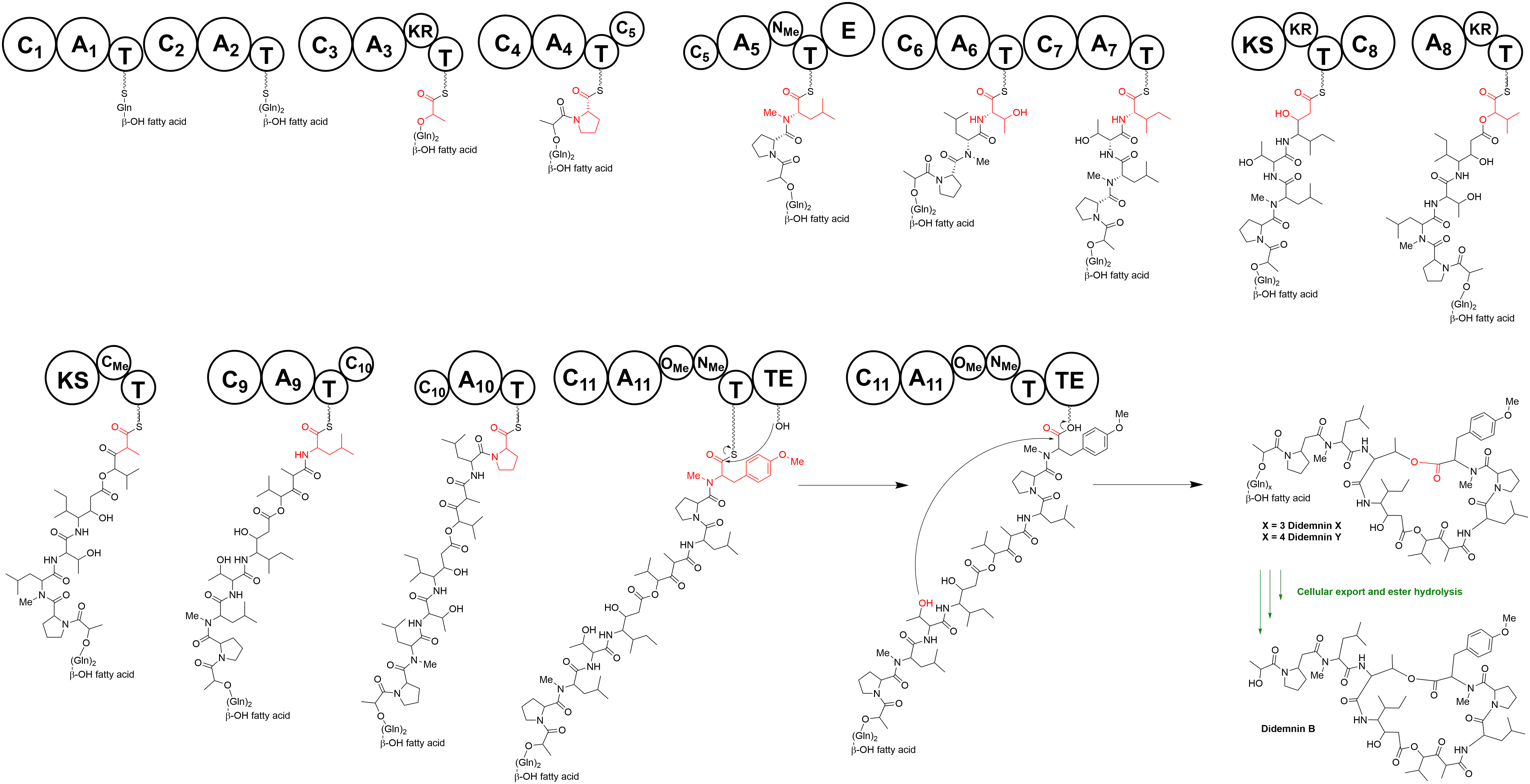
Biosynthesis Pathway Didemnin B

The proposed pathway of the biosynthesis of didemnin B starts on Did A. Modules 1 and 2 both incorporate a glycine on a β-OH fatty acid. On DidB, the adenylation (A) domain is loaded by pyruvate and subsequently reduced in its cis conformation by the ketoreductase (KR) domain, yielding the lactate bounded to the thiolation (T) domain. Monomodular didC incorporates proline, before tridomain didD elongates the peptide chain with 3 amino acids. The adenylation (A) domain of didD is loaded with leucine and subsequently N-methylated by the methyltransferase (MT) domain and converted into N-methylated D-leucine by the epimerase (E) domain. The N-methylated leucine is the only D-amino acid in didemnin B. The second module on didD incorporates threonine and the third module on the domain attached isoleucine, assembling the tetrapeptide (Pro)-(N-Me-D-Leu)-(Thr)-(Ile). DidE is a PKS, but lacks an acyltransferase (AT) domain. Module 8 on didE attaches a ketide-extended β-hydroxy-γ-isostatin. It is suggested that the didemnin PKS mobilizes AT domain FabD from a Fatty Acid Synthase (FAS), since there iis no AT domain present in the didemin genome. The DidF A domain is loaded with 2-oxoisovaleric acid and incorporates α-hydroxy acid 2-hydroxyisovaleric acid. Module 10 on PKS DidG adds a second round of malonate extension. The MT domain on DidG adds an α-methyl group to this residue. Monomodular domains DidH, DidI and DidJ elongate the chain with respectively leucine, proline and tyrosine. The two MT domains on DidJ methylates tyrosine twice, to yield N-methyl-O-methyl-tyrosine, finalizing the assembly of linear didemnin B. The Thioesterase (TE) domain on module DidJ releases the product in its cyclized form.

== See also ==
- Trabectedin
