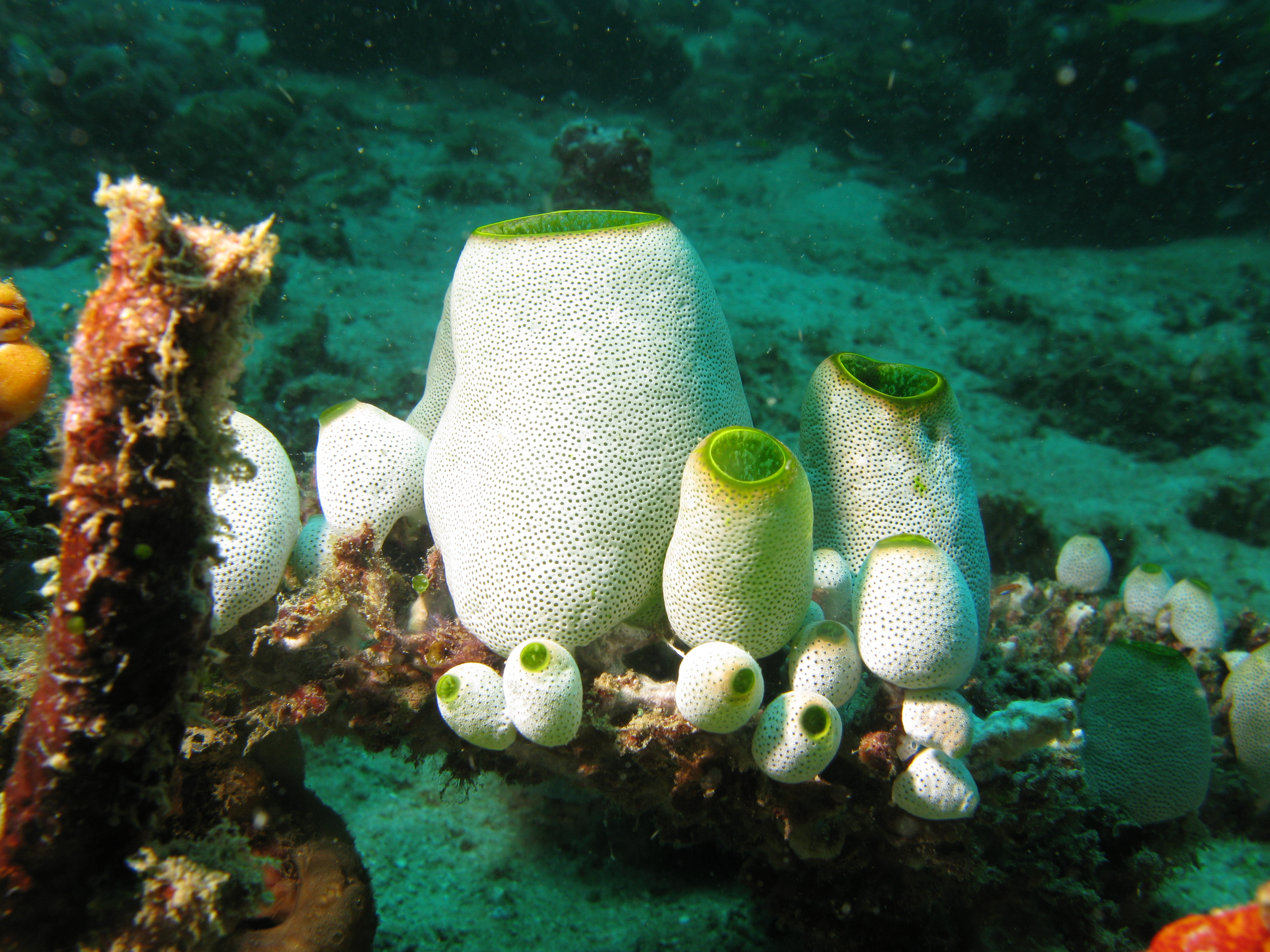
- Didemnum molle

Scientific classification
- Kingdom: Animalia
- Phylum: Chordata
- Subphylum: Tunicata
- Class: Ascidiacea
- Order: Aplousobranchia
- Family: Didemnidae; Giard, 1872

Genera
- See text

= Didemnidae =

Didemnidae Temporal range: Ypresian–Recent

Family of tunicates

Didemnidae is the largest family of colonial tunicates in the order Aplousobranchia.

These marine animals are found in shallow water on the seabed. Members of this family have reduced zooids that form highly integrated and encrusting sheet-like colonies. The body of each zooid is divided into a thorax and an abdomen. They are highly speciose with 578 named species representing a fifth of the species in the class Ascidiacea and members of this family can be found in marine waters across the globe. Didemnidae is the only genera within Chordata to form obligate photo symbiotic relationships which are made with cyanobacteria form the genus Prochloron.

== Systematics ==
The World Register of Marine Species lists the following genera:

- Atriolum Kott, 1983
- Clitella Kott, 2001
- Coelocormus Herdman, 1886
- Didemnum Savigny, 1816
- Diplosoma Macdonald, 1859
- Leptoclinides Bjerkan, 1905
- Polysyncraton Nott, 1892
- Trididemnum Della Valle, 1881

== Description ==
Didemnids small zooids can range 5mm to under 1mm in length and display an elongated digestive track and coiling of sperm ducts. They grow in sheet like colonies that can be coloured in shades of black, brown, white, violet, or pink. However, colour cannot be used in species identification as there is much variation within species and overlap between different groups. In symbiotic genera their colour is mainly determined by the composition of their bacterial photo symbionts. Didemnid colonies can grow meters long by the process of fusion and some species can move within their colonies. Their body wall is supported by aragonite spicules except in the genus Diplosoma where they have been secondarily lost. In the remaining genera the spicules have a star shaped polyaxon form and are loosely arranged in a pentagonal pattern. These spicules can be as large as 0.24mm in diameter but usually remain between 0.1 and 0.05mm. Some members have multiple sets of spicules with different forms. These spicule forms can be diagnostic of the species.

== Habitat ==
Didemnids can be found in tropical to temperate marine waters throughout the world but have the highest diversity along the boundary between the Indian and Pacific Oceans. They exists on a wide variety of substrates, including rocks, mussel beds, boats, corals, and seaweed, making them pervasive benthic organisms in both tropical and temperate ecosystems. Didemnids are commonly found in intertidal settings where their flat colonies help resist wave action, and can survive out of water for two hours at temperatures of up to 35 degrees. Members of this family can also occur well below sea level with Lissoclinum perforatum existing at depths of 150m.

== Evolution ==
Molecular analysis supports Didemnidae and each genus within it as a monophyletic group which diverged from Polycitoridea. The earliest known didemnid fossils occur in the Paris Basin late in the Ypresian stage.

However, the obligate photo symbiont genera do not form a monophyletic group indicating that Prochloron evolved for a single genus before adapting to similar genera that had already diverged, supported by its molecular similarities, but the mechanism for how the obligate symbiont was transferred between genera is unknown.

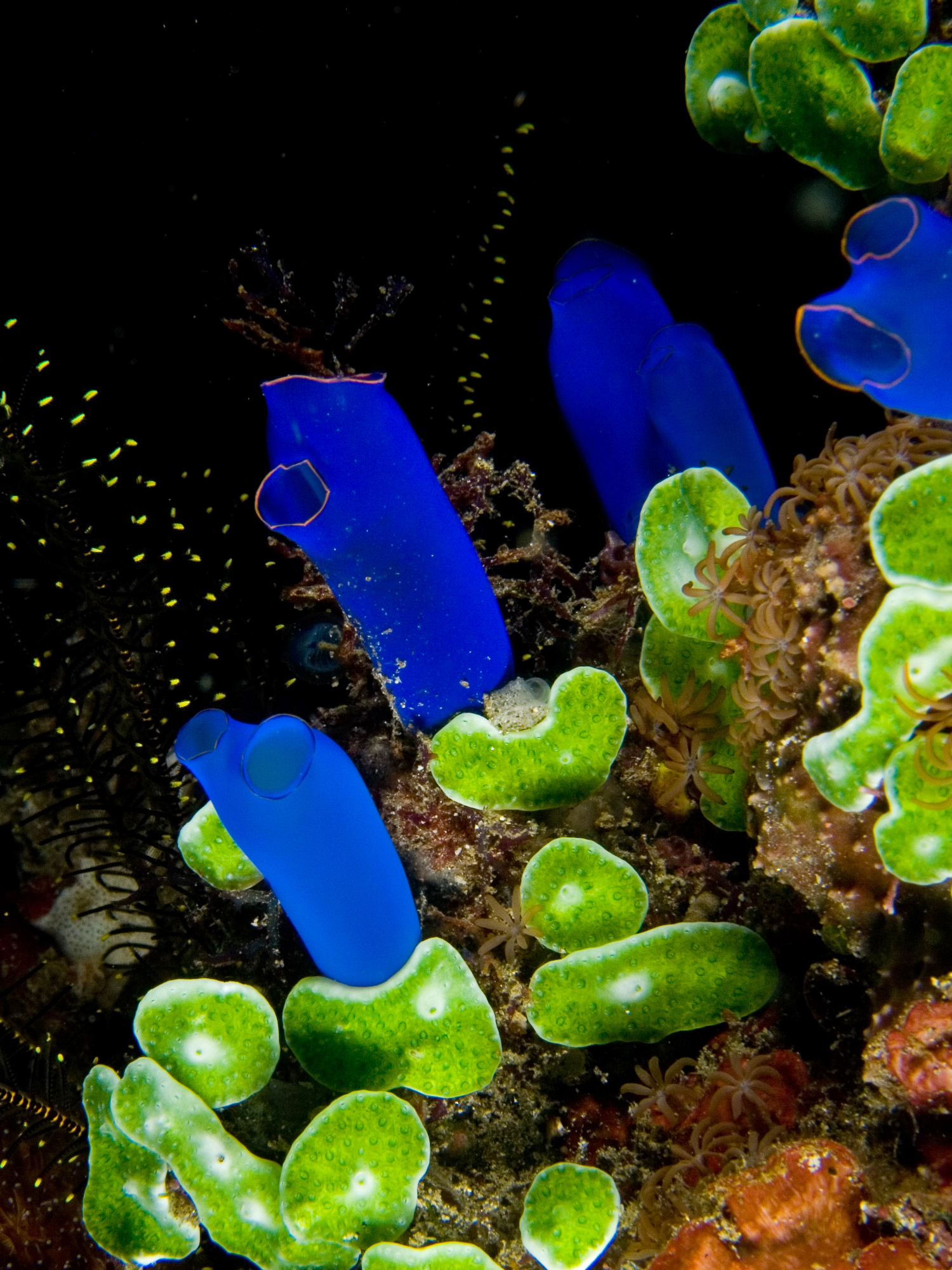
Colonies of Diplosoma virens have fluorescent green appearance due to symbionts. Blue tunicates are from a separate family, Diazonidae

== Ecology ==
=== Photo symbiosis ===
Didemnid species vary greatly in the extent to which they rely on photo symbiosis. The genera Clitella and Coelocormus remain exclusively active suspension feeders while Atriolum, Leptoclinides, and Polysyncraton can engage in facultative photo symbiosis. In these cases the symbiont colonies grow externally on the test. The genera Didemnum, Diplosoma, Trididemnum, and Lissoclinum are completely dependent on their symbiosis with internal colonies either in the common cloacal cavity or the tunic.

The primary photobionts are cyanobacteria from the genus Prochloron which has not been found without a Didemnid host. Prochloron contains chlorophyll a and b which preferentially absorb light between the 420-460 and 640-680 nm wavelengths respectively. Although, all photosymbiotic Didemnids use Prochloron, some will also facultatively associate with red cyanobacteria from the genera Synechocystis or Oscillatoria. Didemnum etiolum is the only species thought to be dependent on red cyanobacteria. These symbionts widen the spectrum of light the didemnid can use by producing phycoerythrin pigments that absorb light between the 470 to 620 nm range. In cases were a Didemnid uses red cyanobacteria they will be restricted to the tunic while Prochloron is grown in the common cloacal cavity except in Trididemnum clinides which can cultivate both types of bacteria in the tunic.

In exchange for the nutrients the Didemnid receives Prochloron is provided an exclusive environment that is protected from predation. Prochloron can also use the Didemnid test as a way to filter out damaging UV radiation by releasing mycosporine-like amino acids into the test.

Defensive Mechanisms

Didemnum species will increase production of morula cells when there is more spatial competition, particularly through interspecific interactions, according to the study on Didemnum perlucidum. Phenoloxidase, an enzyme that produces toxic quinones as part of a chemical defense, is produced by these cells. Morula cells were found to be more prevalent in "contact" locations and to be at their maximum when other encrusting species developed on top of the Didemnidae. Overgrowth indicated that they had fewer resources and light, which put their safety in jeopardy.

Prochloron may also contribute to defense by producing cytotoxins. Analysis of Trididemnum solidum found that it contained the toxins didemnin B and tamandarin A that were demonstrated to be distasteful a variety of fresh and salt water fish species.

Predation

The habitat of boxfish (Ostracion meleagris) overlaps with stony reef zones, where Didemnid families of photosymbiotic Ascidians can be found. Boxfish have adapted to tolerate Didemnid toxins giving them access to a food source without competition.

Didemnids are also subject to parasitism by copepods within the cloacal cavity from the family Notodelphyidae which have evolved species specific relationships.

Environmental Impact

The invasive properties of Didemnidae species, particularly Didemnum psammatodes and Didemnum vexillum, have been widely studied due to their significant ecological and economic impacts..

D. psammatodes has been reported to spread along the southern Indian coast, with its distribution strongly correlated to substrate availability, marine traffic, and the species' life-history traits. The movement of ships and commercial vessels facilitates the spread of these organisms contributing to their rapid invasions. Similarly, the D. vexillum is known to cause significant ecological damage by overgrowing sessile species, including other tunicates. The large amounts of plankton they consume can also disrupt local food webs and their reduced amount of predation further enhances their ability to spread without significant control.

Research into the impacts of D. vexillum has shown that its invasive populations can severely reduce species richness in invaded areas. For instance, D. vexillum has caused declines in biodiversity in North American ecosystems by outcompeting local organisms. This invasive tunicate has also migrated to New Zealand, where its spread has led to the implementation of various management strategies, including quarantining, cleaning, and the use of anti-fouling agents on vessels.

Diplosoma similis, a phototrophic species, has been reported to rapidly distribute on coral reefs, taking advantage of natural disturbances such as storms. Its ability to fragment and disperse increases its colonization potential, leading to competition with live corals for space, and on Swains Island the abundance of D. similis has been linked to the decline in live coral populations.

The spread of Didemnidae species is a growing concern, especially in areas with high marine traffic, such as the Persian Gulf and southern India, where invasions have been particularly pronounced. These regions are seeing increased rates of Didemnum proliferation, further suggesting a link between commercial activities and the spread of these invasive tunicates. The ability of Didemnidae species to adapt to different environments and their lack of significant natural predators make them particularly effective invaders, posing ongoing challenges to marine biodiversity conservation efforts.

== Life cycle ==
Analysis of the Didemnum rodriguesi highlights the seasonal change in modes of reproduction. This species alternated between sexual reproduction in the summer and asexual reproduction in the winter. This is demonstrated by a faster rate of colonial growth during winter months in comparison to summer months when temperature are favorable for sexual reproduction which leading to a large amount of brooding of eggs. Didemnid species can be hermaphroditic, but are unable to fertilize their own eggs. This process is initiated through the release of free-spawning of sperm into the environment which are taken up by other individuals for internal fertilization. Embryos are brooded until development of larvae in which case they are dispersed into the environment. In symbiotic groups the larvae have photosymbiotic bacteria transferred to them from the parent colony. Convergent evolution is seen in the transmission of symbionts, according to research on Trididemnum nubilum and Trididemnum clinides. Although the procedure varies by species, each has separately developed a way to transmit prochloron and non-prochloron species vertically to their embryos. Both T. nubilum and T. clinides transfer their symbionts by encasing them in its tunic cells and integrating them into the embryo's inner tunic. Whereas, in colonies that keep symbionts in the common cloacal cavity the bacteria connect to the larva's truck and it exits. Larvae from the genus Diplosoma have further developed a rastrum to increase symbiont entrainment. The larvae are lecithotrophic feeding off the yolk until they find a suitable substrate for plantation. Once sufficient substrate has been found settlement and metamorphosis occurs where the larvae develops to a zooid and goes through sexual or asexual reproduction to generate a new colony. Asexual reproduction of Didemnidae occurs through three methods; fragmentation, fission, and budding. These methods ensure a rapid generation time which allows the species to grow through times of scarcity or environmental stress. Fusion of two nearby colonies had also been observed by Didemndiae.

== Gallery ==
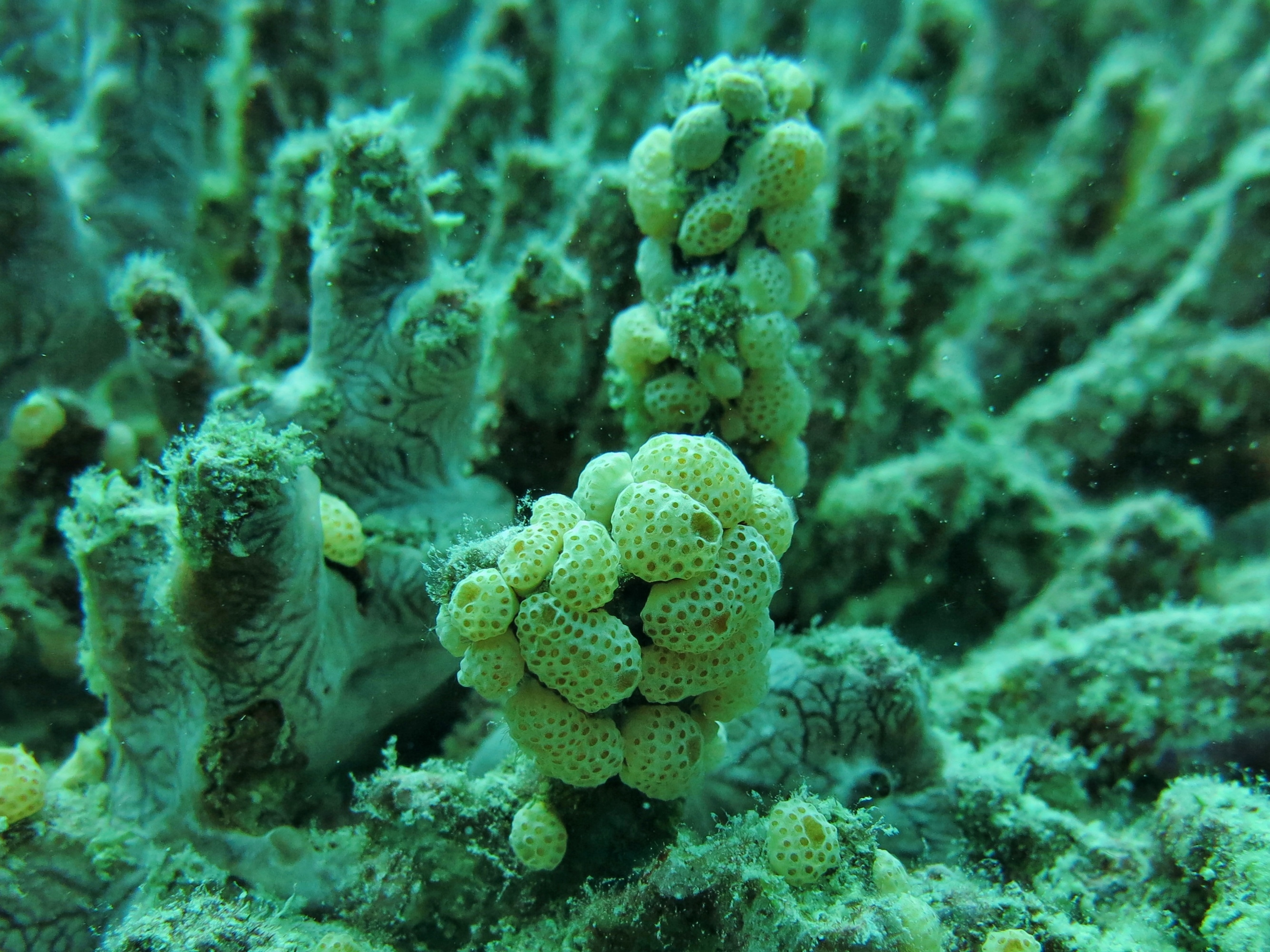
Atriolum robustum

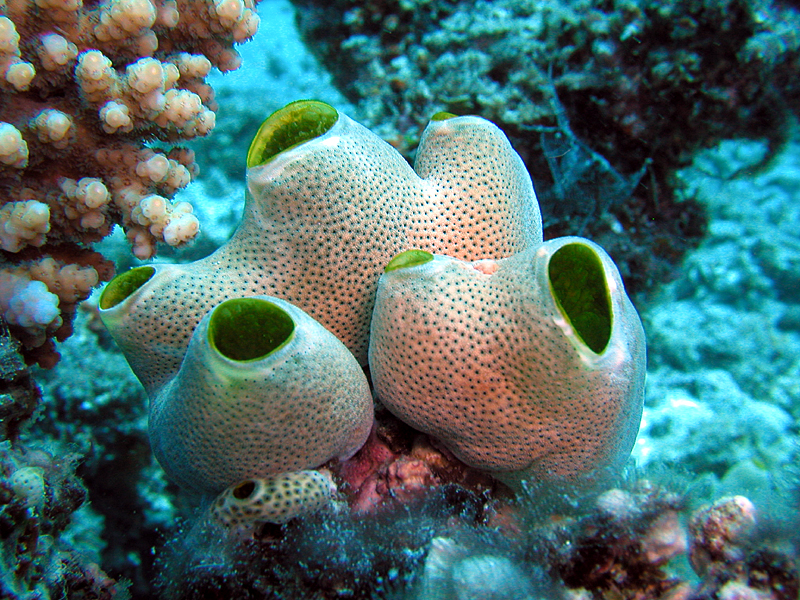
Didemnum molle

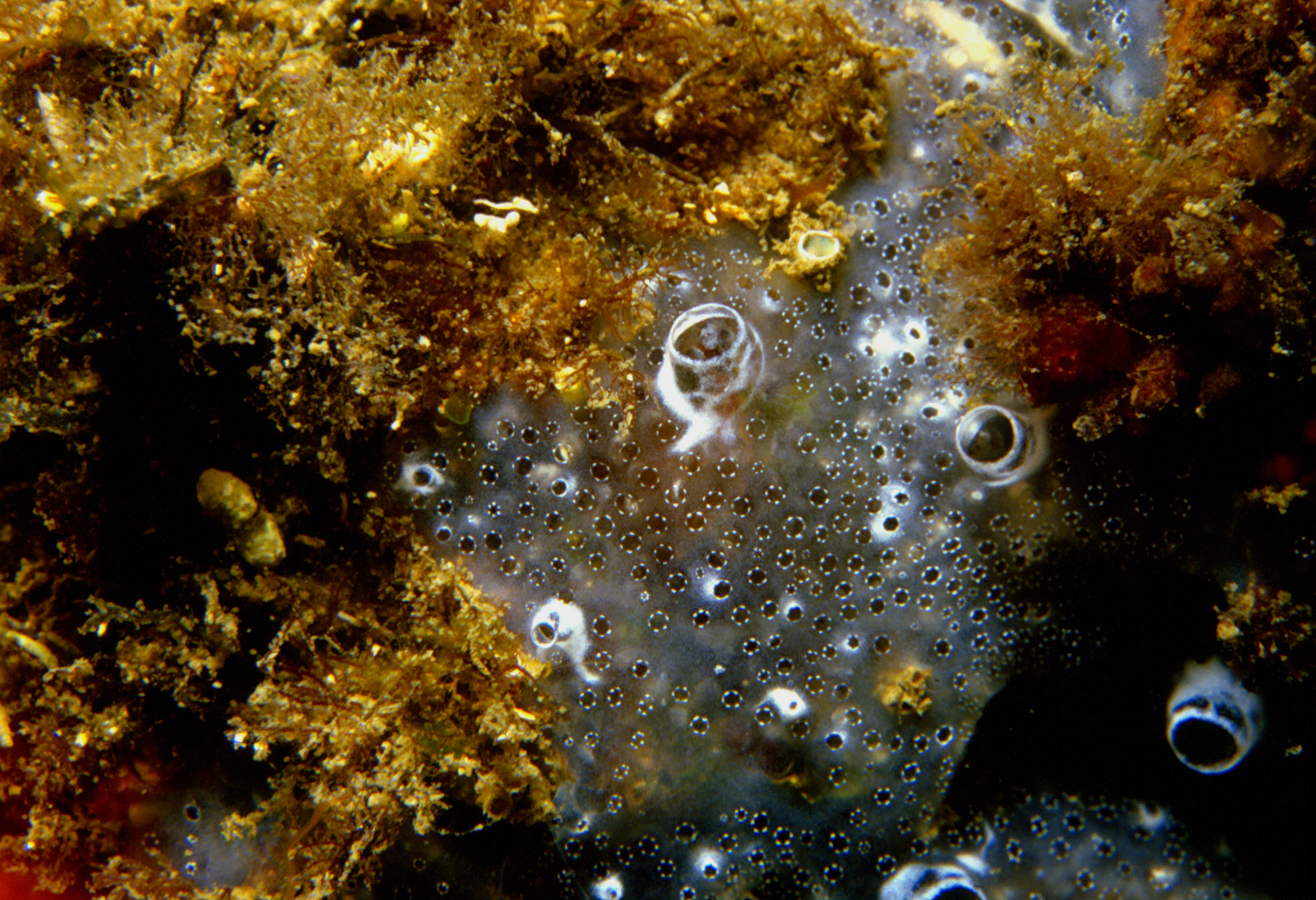
Diplosoma spongiforme

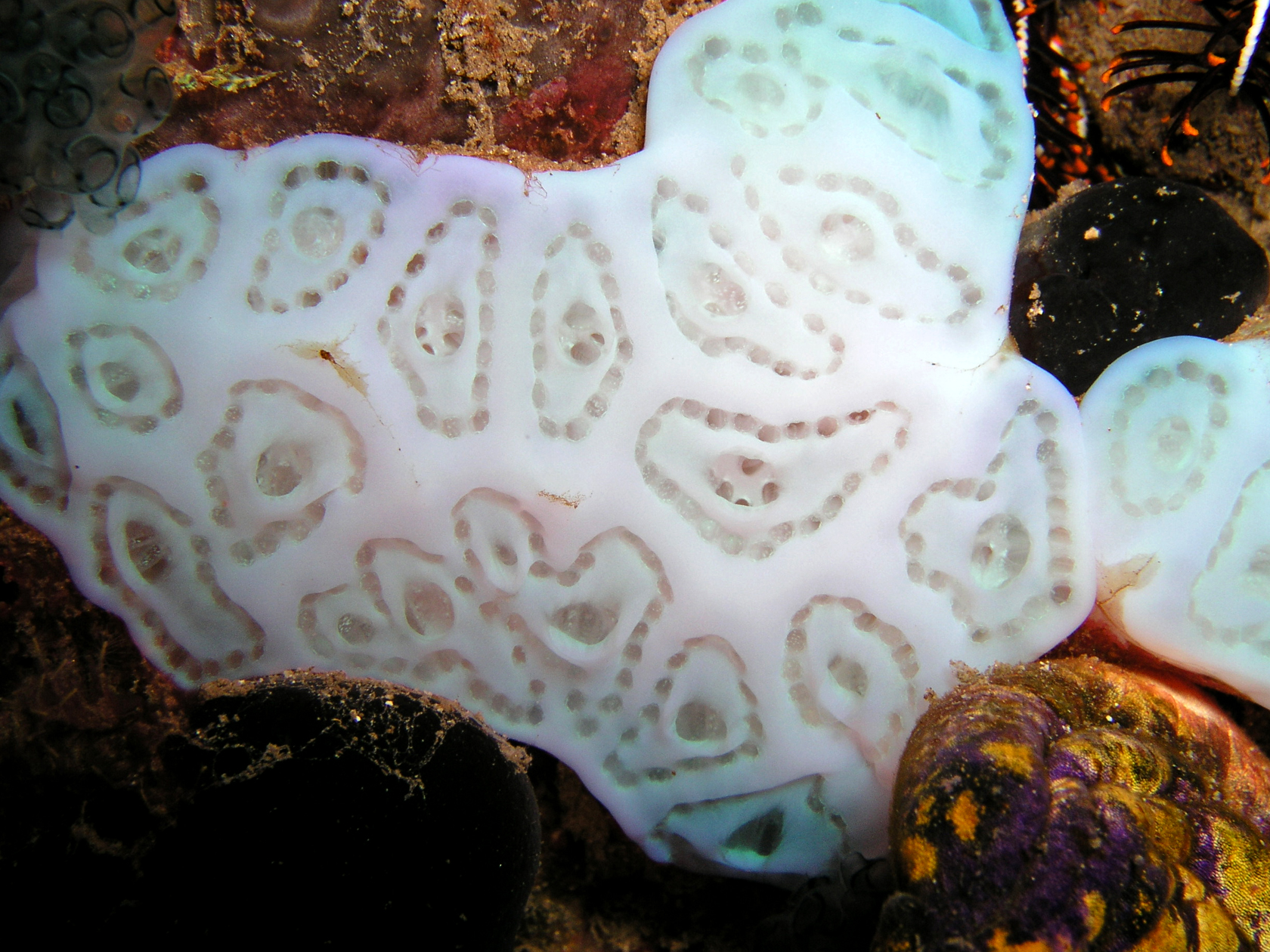
Lissoclinum patellum

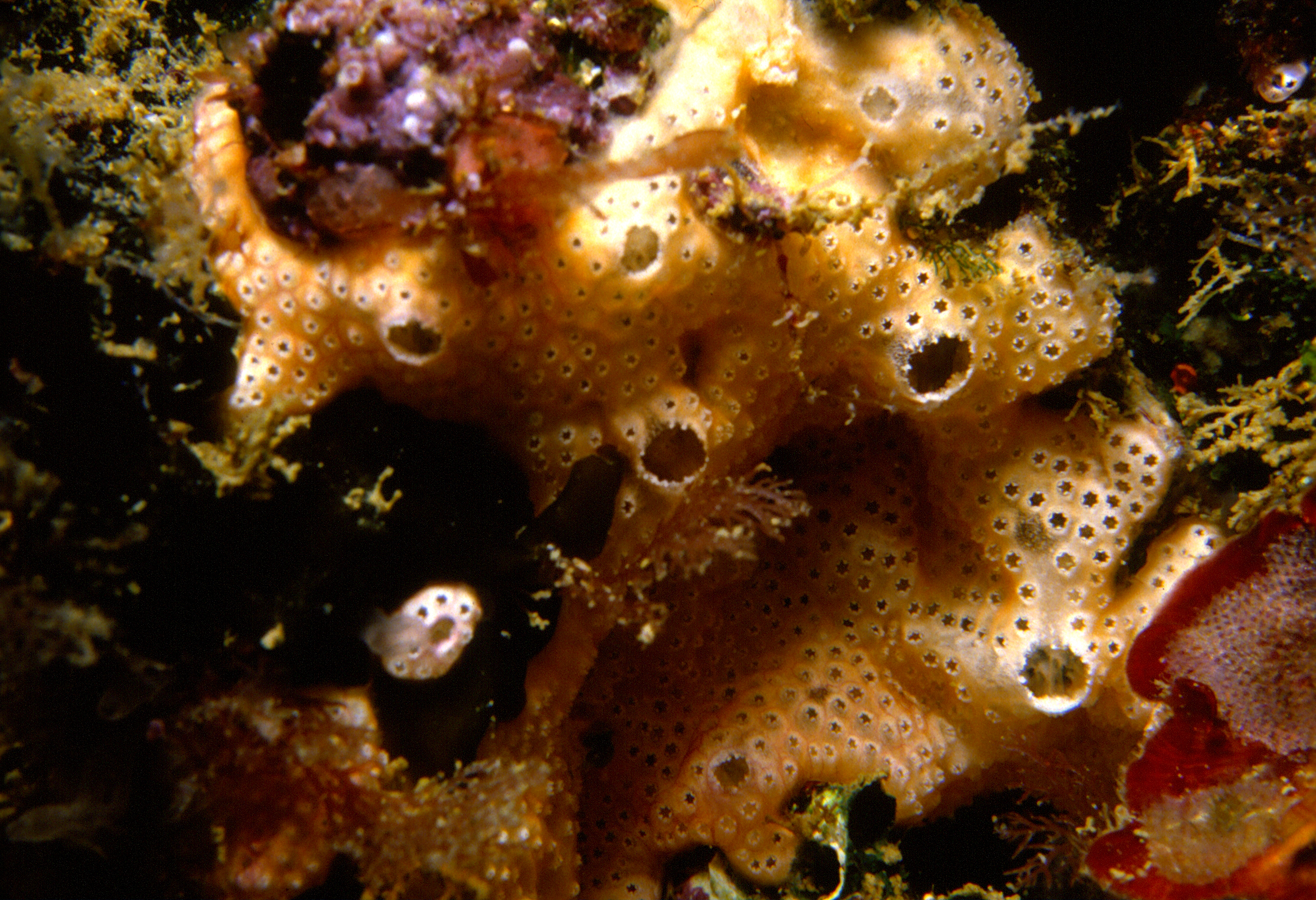
Polysyncraton bilobatum

== See also ==
- Didemnin
