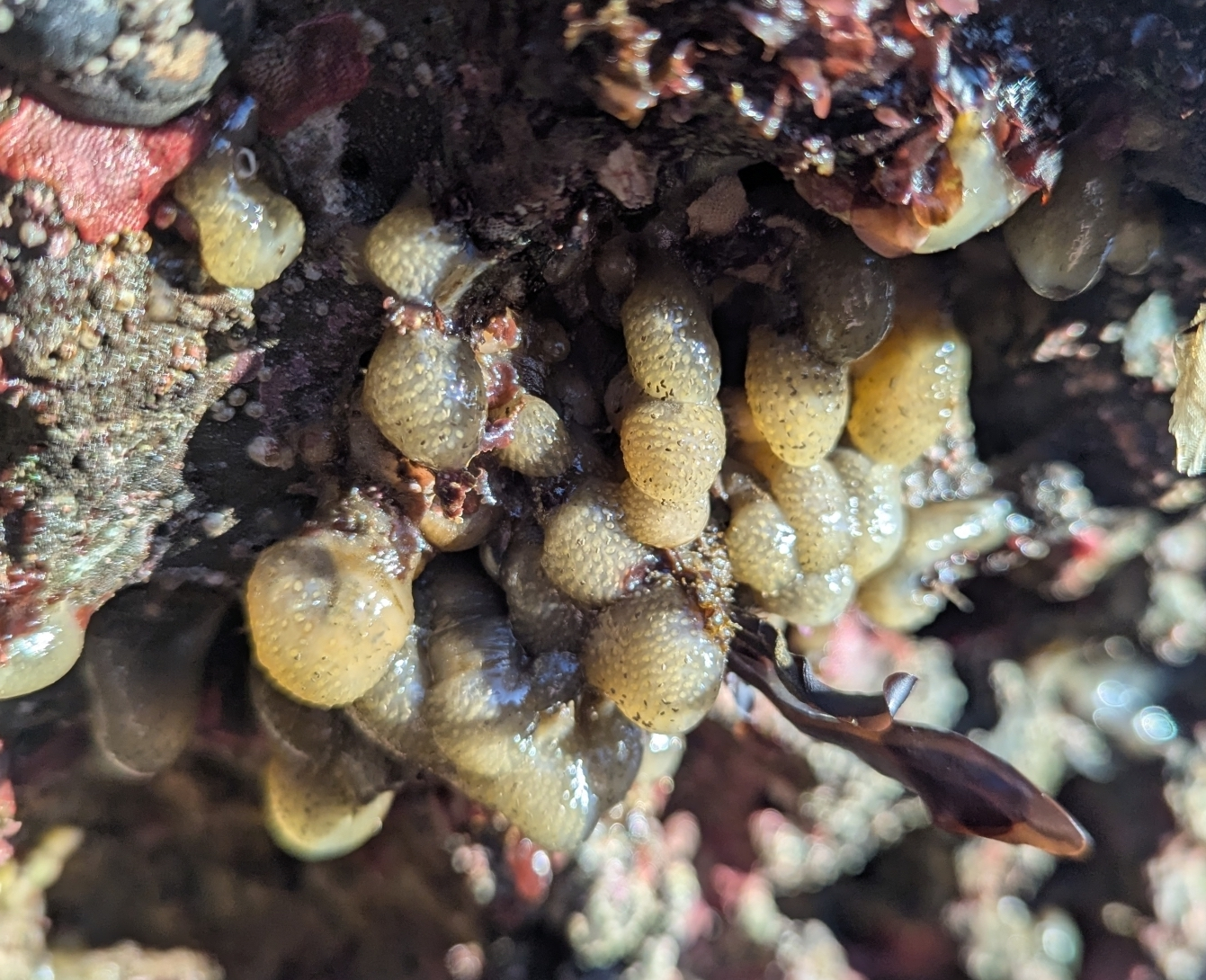

Scientific classification
- Kingdom: Animalia
- Phylum: Chordata
- Subphylum: Tunicata
- Class: Ascidiacea
- Order: Aplousobranchia
- Family: Polycitoridae
- Genus: Eudistoma
- Species: E. ritteri

Binomial name
- Eudistoma ritteri Van Name, 1945

Synonyms
- Archidistoma ritteri (Van Name, 1945); Eudistoma lobata (Berrill, 1935)

= Eudistoma ritteri =

Species of sea squirt

Eudistoma ritteri is a species of colonial sea squirt in the family Polycitoridae. It is native to the Pacific coast of North America, from Alaska to southern California, where it can be found on rock ledges and cave floors in the low intertidal zone. E. ritteri was first described by the American zoologist and conservationist Willard G. Van Name in 1945.

== Description ==
Eudistoma ritteri has stalked lobes or lobular heads of different sizes that arise from a basal attachment. The lobes are typically smooth, tan to yellowish, and somewhat translucent, bearing as many as 200 or more zooids. The zooids are visible by their whitish anterior ends, which are arranged in circular systems, and each contain an independent siphon that opens at the colony surface.

== Anatomy ==
The body of an individual E. ritteri zooid can be divided into thoracic and abdominal regions. The thorax contains the neural complex as well as the rectum, anus, and pharynx, while the abdomen contains organs like the stomach, intestine, heart, and gonads. Like most ascidians, E. ritteri is a simultaneous hermaphrodite, bearing both an amorphous ovary and two pear-shaped testicular follicles.

The thorax is largely occupied by the pharynx, whose walls are perforated with three rows of stigmata (gill slits) that absorb oxygen and trap planktonic food particles. E. ritteri feeds by taking in water through its oral siphon, which is passed from the pharynx to the atrium and out through the atrial siphon.

== Etymology ==
Eudistoma ritteri was named after William Emerson Ritter, the American biologist who founded the Marine Biological Association of San Diego (now Scripps Institution of Oceanography at UC San Diego).
