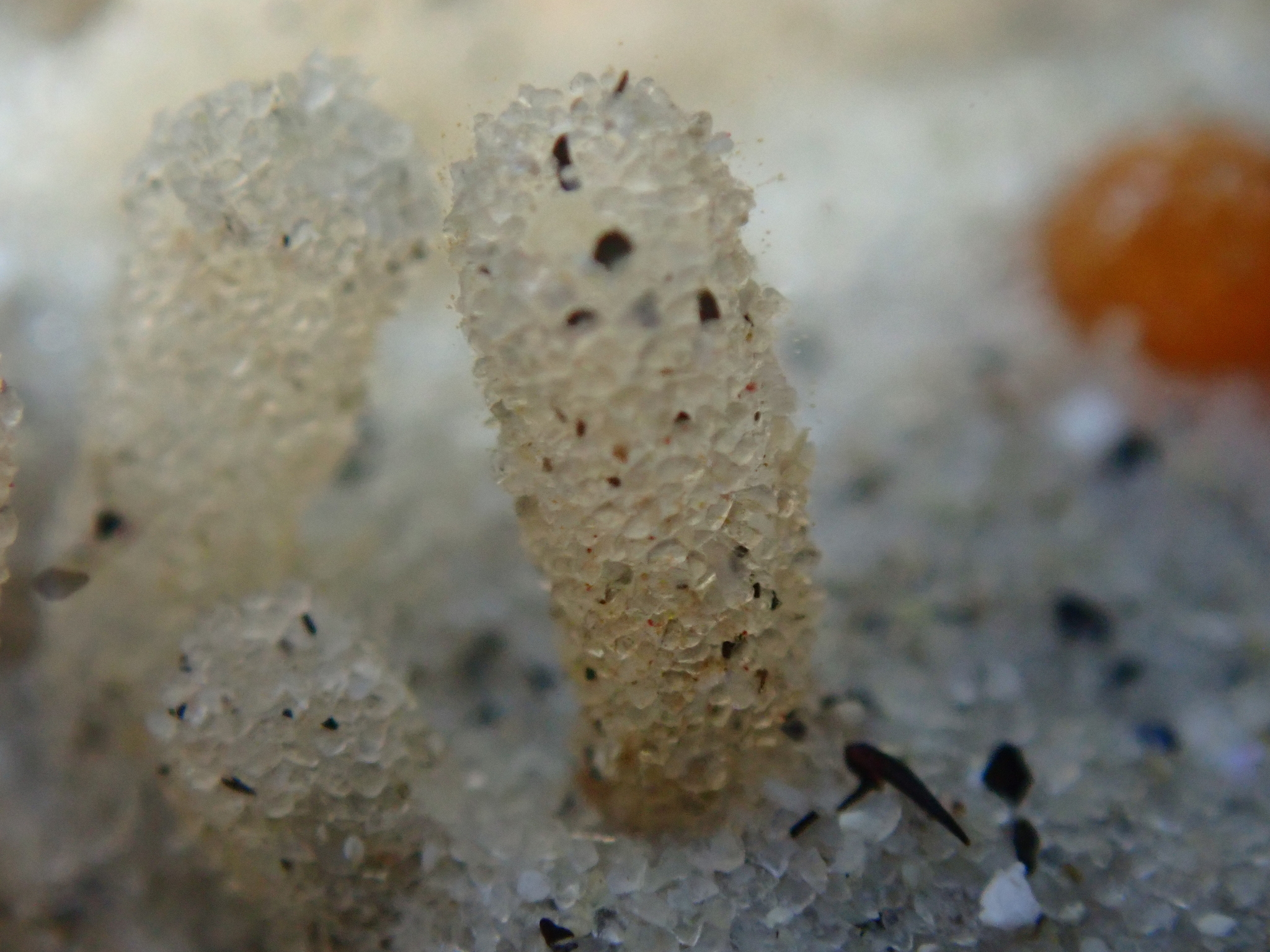

Scientific classification
- Kingdom: Animalia
- Phylum: Chordata
- Subphylum: Tunicata
- Class: Ascidiacea
- Order: Aplousobranchia
- Family: Euherdmaniidae
- Genus: Euherdmania
- Species: E. claviformis

Binomial name
- Euherdmania claviformis (Ritter, 1903)

Synonyms
- Herdmania claviformis Ritter, 1903

= Euherdmania claviformis =

Species of sea squirt

Euherdmania claviformis, the tunic-band compound tunicate, is a species of social sea squirt found on rocks along the California coast, from the low intertidal to shallow subtidal.

== Description ==
Euherdmania claviformis forms aggregations of long, colorless, tube-like zooids that are typically covered in clear sand. The length of these tubes varies, but they can reach up to 5 cm in height. The tubes are club-shaped. The distal end is wider than the base, with an average basal diameter of 2 mm and an average distal diameter of 4 mm.

== Natural history ==
Euherdmania claviformis usually grows among the roots of surf grass, especially in regions where the surf stirs up sand. The animal reproduces by fertilizing and protecting its developing eggs internally. The eggs develop into microscopic, free-swimming tadpole larvae. After the tadpoles are ejected from the adult tunicate, they immediately swim towards the surface of the water where they float in a film, before sinking and settling on rock substrates. The larvae do not feed in their free-swimming stage, and the average time between dispersal and attachment is only 60 minutes. Minutes after they attach, they withdraw their tails, and within 48 hours, they reconfigure their internal organs to become sessile adults. They do not start feeding until about a week after attachment.

== Taxonomy ==
Euherdmania claviformis was first described by William Emerson Ritter in 1903. In doing so, he established a new genus and family. The family Euherdmaniidae is quite unusual among tunicates, and Euherdmania is its only genus. Historically, at different times, the genus has also been placed in the families Polycitoridae and Synoicidae.
