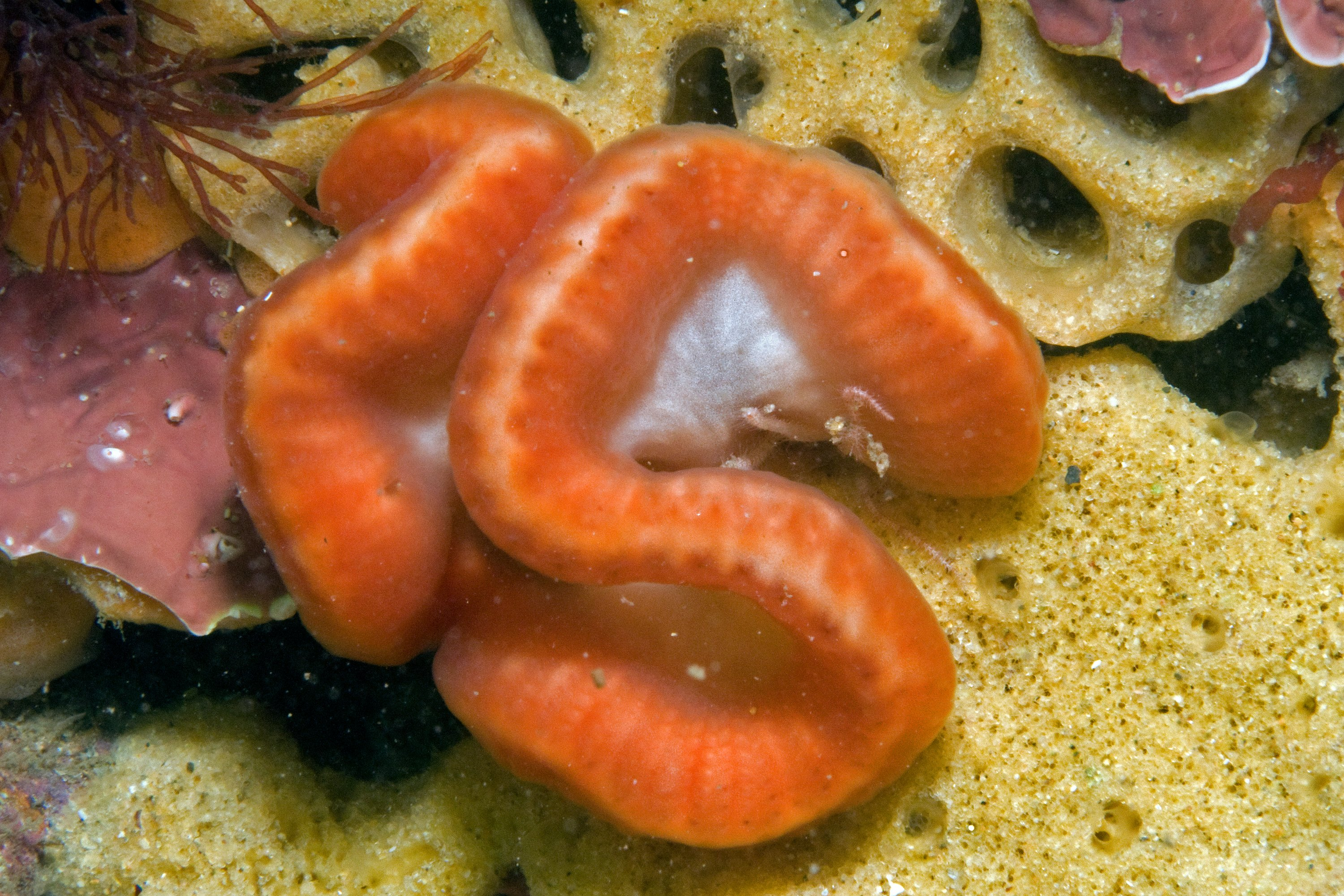

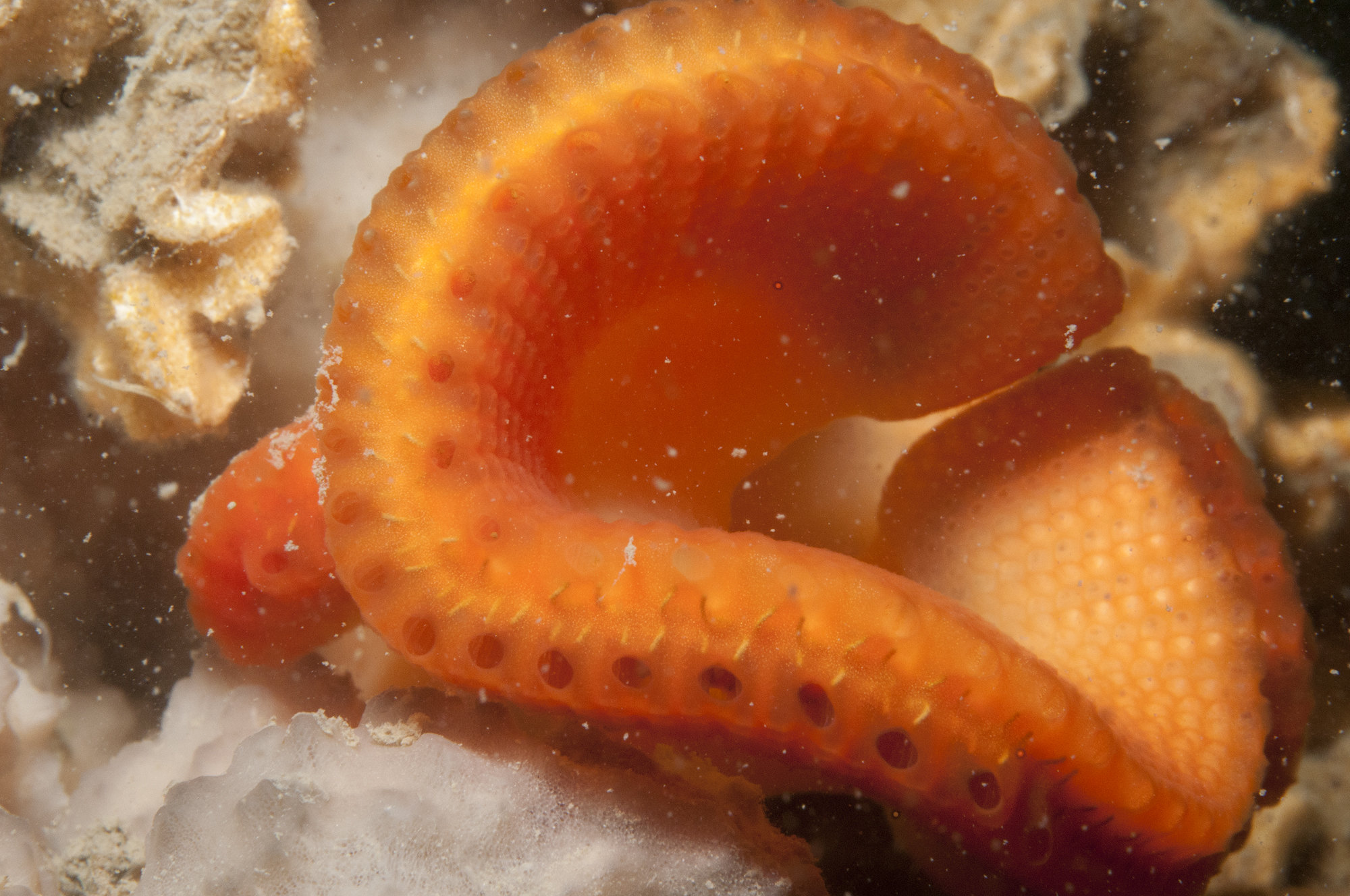

Scientific classification
- Domain: Eukaryota
- Kingdom: Animalia
- Phylum: Chordata
- Subphylum: Tunicata
- Class: Ascidiacea
- Order: Aplousobranchia
- Family: Holozoidae
- Genus: Sycozoa
- Species: S. cerebriformis

Binomial name
- Sycozoa cerebriformis (Quoy & Gaimard, 1834)

Synonyms
- Aplidie cerebriforme Quoy & Gaimard, 1834; Colella plicata; Colella incerta; Distaplia cerebriforme

= Sycozoa cerebriformis =

Species of tunicate

Sycozoa cerebriformis, (common name - brain ascidian) is a sea squirt in the family Holozoidae, first described by Jean René Constant Quoy and Joseph Paul Gaimard in 1834 as Aplidie cerebriforme. The taxonomic decision which determined the name, Sycozoa cerebriformis, and the species' synonymy was given by Patricia Kott in 1990.

It is found from Queensland, New South Wales, Victoria, Tasmania, South Australia to Western Australia, on the sea floor and in caves and crevices at depths up to 50 m.

== Description ==
This sea-squirt is composed of a folded colony of zooids in double rows. The siphons run along the top of the twisted structure, which grows up to 15 cm. The colonies start as flattened fans. On growing and expanding, the colonies fold and bend resulting in a brain-like appearance.
