= Rhopalaea crassa =

Scientific classification
- Kingdom: Animalia
- Phylum: Chordata
- Subphylum: Tunicata
- Class: Ascidiacea
- Order: Aplousobranchia
- Family: Diazonidae
- Genus: Rhopalaea
- Species: R. crassa

Binomial name
- Rhopalaea crassa (Herdman, 1880)

Synonyms
- Ecteinascidia crassa Herdman, 1880; Rhopalopsis crassa (Herdman, 1880); Ciona indica Sluiter, 1904; Rhopalaea indica (Sluiter, 1904); Ecteinascidia fusca Herdman, 1880; Ecteinascidia solida Herdman, 1906; Rhopalaea mutuensis Oka, 1927

Species of sea squirt

Rhopalaea crassa, is a species of tunicate in the family Diazonidae. Despite popular online sources, this species is yellow or rarely white. The cobalt blue species often called "Rhopalaea crassa" in error is actually Rhopalaea fusca. A different, undescribed Rhopalaea species with neon-colored networking has also often had this name erroneously attributed to it.
