= Sigillina exigua =

Scientific classification
- Domain: Eukaryota
- Kingdom: Animalia
- Phylum: Chordata
- Subphylum: Tunicata
- Class: Ascidiacea
- Order: Aplousobranchia
- Family: Holozoidae
- Genus: Sigillina
- Species: S. exigua

Binomial name
- Sigillina exigua Kott, 2006

Species of sea squirt

Sigillina exigua is a sea squirt in the family Holozoidae and was first described in 2006 by Patricia Kott, from a specimen (SAM E3300) collected at a depth of 10-12 metres in Western River, Kangaroo Island.
