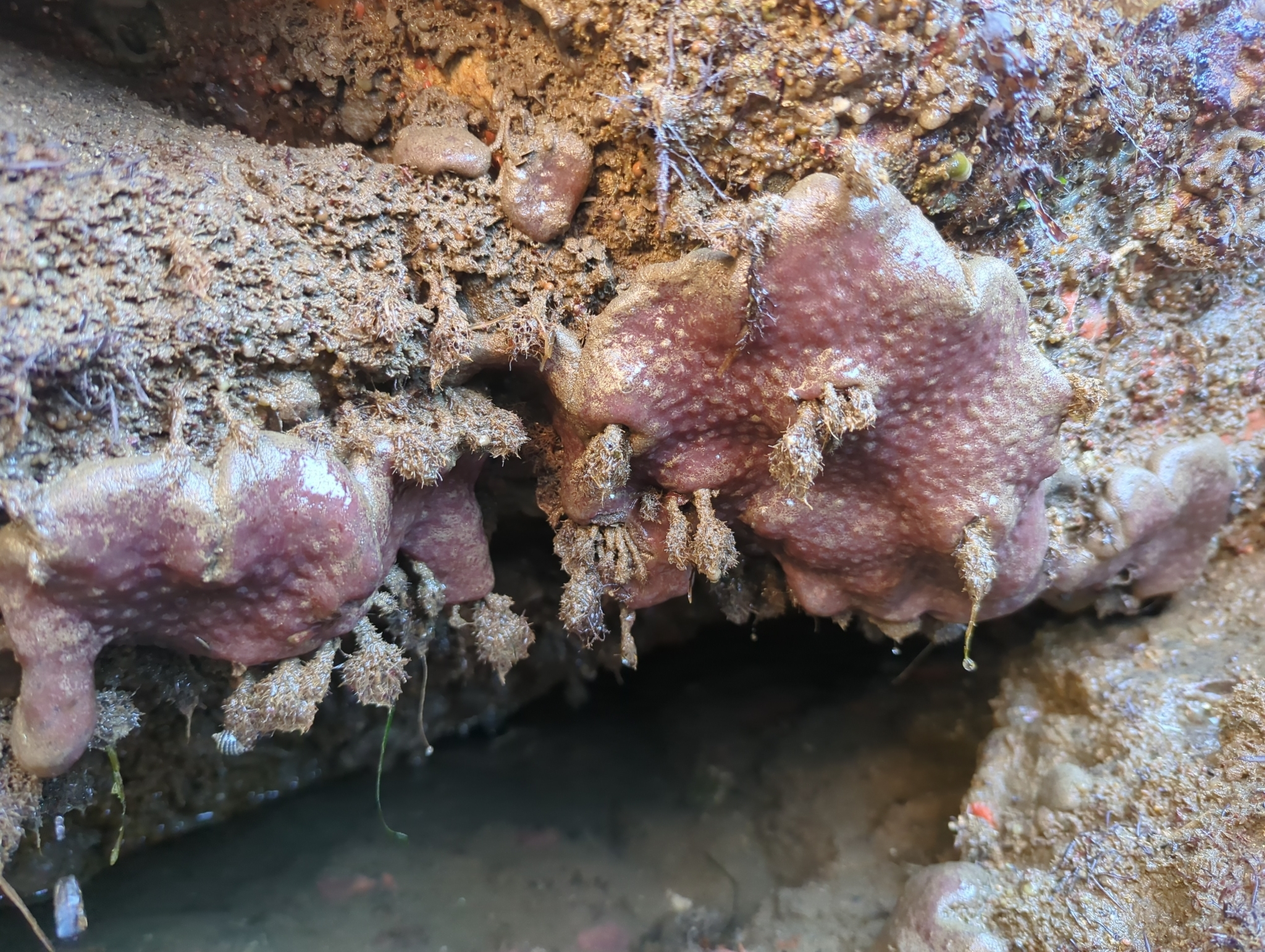

Scientific classification
- Kingdom: Animalia
- Phylum: Chordata
- Subphylum: Tunicata
- Class: Ascidiacea
- Order: Aplousobranchia
- Family: Polycitoridae
- Genus: Eudistoma
- Species: E. psammion

Binomial name
- Eudistoma psammion Ritter & Forsyth, 1917

= Eudistoma psammion =

Species of sea squirts

Eudistoma psammion is a species of tunicate of the family Polycitoridae described in 1917 by W. E. Ritter and R. H. Forsyth. It is found in American western coastal waters from the US State of Washington to San Diego in California.
