= Rhopalaea meridionalis =

Scientific classification
- Kingdom: Animalia
- Phylum: Chordata
- Subphylum: Tunicata
- Class: Ascidiacea
- Order: Aplousobranchia
- Family: Diazonidae
- Genus: Rhopalaea
- Species: R. meridionalis

Binomial name
- Rhopalaea meridionalis Kott, 2006

Sea squirt

Rhopalaea meridionalis is a sea squirt in the family Diazonidae and was first described in 2006 by Patricia Kott, from a specimen (QM G308821) collected at a depth of 149 metres from a deep water canyon on the continental slopes off northern Tasmania.
