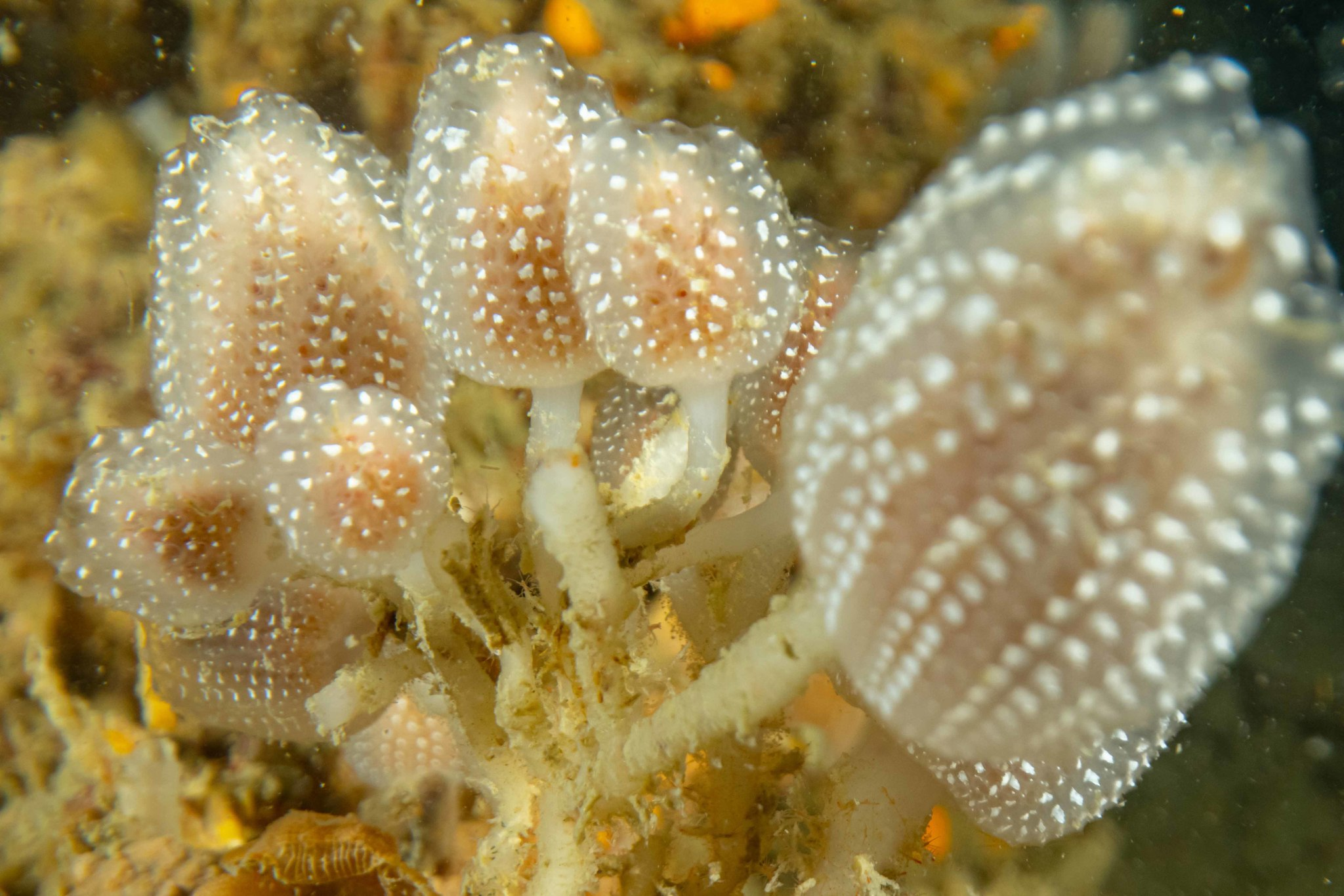
- In New Zealand.

Scientific classification
- Domain: Eukaryota
- Kingdom: Animalia
- Phylum: Chordata
- Subphylum: Tunicata
- Class: Ascidiacea
- Order: Aplousobranchia
- Family: Holozoidae
- Genus: Sycozoa
- Species: S. sigillinoides

Binomial name
- Sycozoa sigillinoides Lesson, 1932

= Sycozoa sigillinoides =

Species of tunicate

Sycozoa sigillinoides is a species of sea squirt in the family Holozoidae, first described by René Lesson in 1932.

== Distribution ==
In Australia, It is found in the waters off Tasmania, and South Australia. Elsewhere it is found in Antarctic and sub-Antarctic waters.

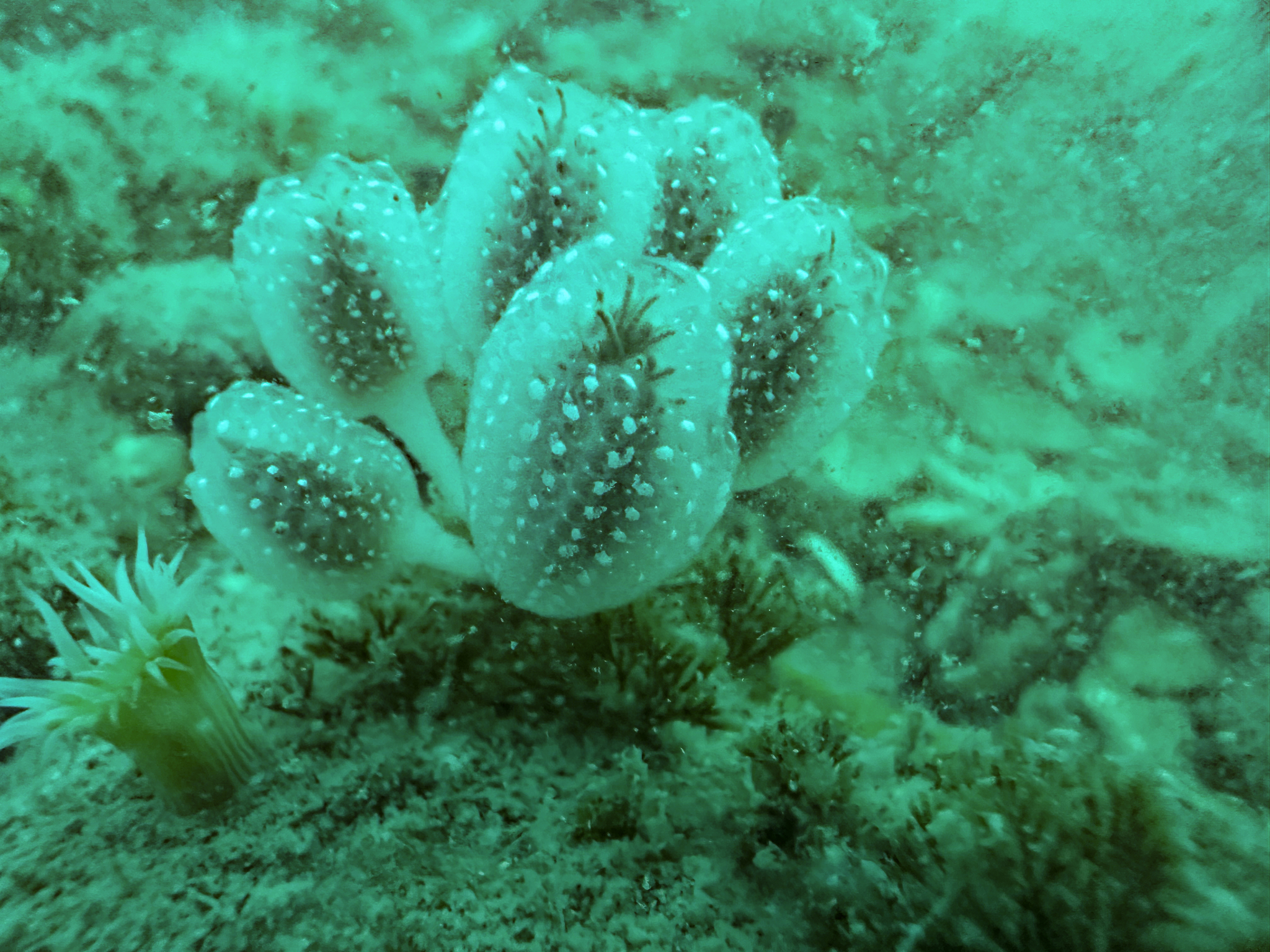
In New Zealand
