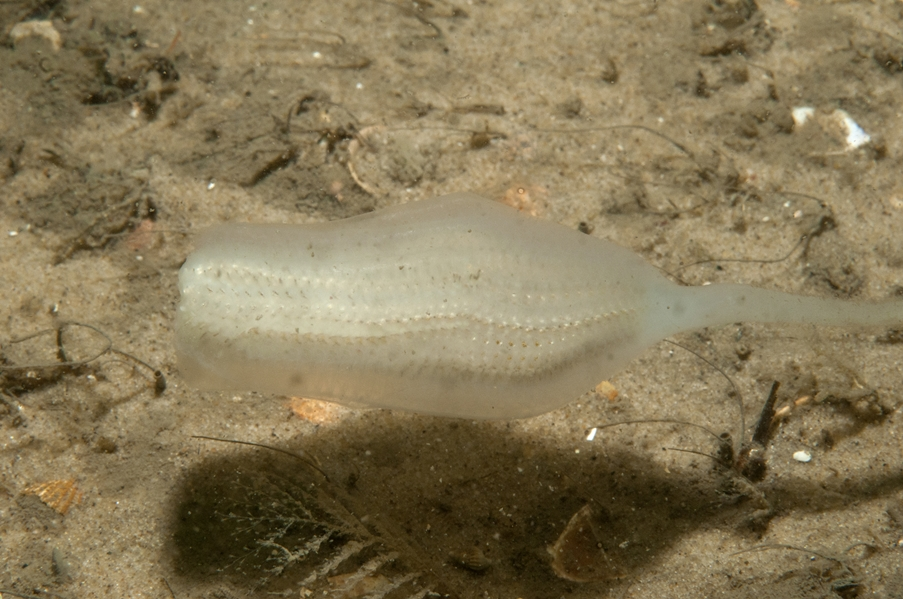

Scientific classification
- Domain: Eukaryota
- Kingdom: Animalia
- Phylum: Chordata
- Subphylum: Tunicata
- Class: Ascidiacea
- Order: Aplousobranchia
- Family: Holozoidae
- Genus: Sycozoa
- Species: S. pulchra

Binomial name
- Sycozoa pulchra (Herdman, 1886)

Synonyms
- Colella pulchra; Colella tenuicaulis

= Sycozoa pulchra =

Species of tunicate

Sycozoa pulchra, (common name - stalked ascidian) is a sea squirt in the family Holozoidae, first described by William Abbott Herdman in 1886 as Colella pulchra. The taxonomic decision which determined the name, Sycozoa pulchra, and the species' synonymy was given by Patricia Kott in 1990.

It is found in coastal waters from Queensland, New South Wales, Victoria, Tasmania, South Australia to Western Australia, and off Indonesia.

== Description ==
This sea-squirt is composed of a cylindrical colony of paired rows of zooids on a stalk. It is usually transparent with white tipped siphons. The colony can grow to 6 cm, on a 30 cm stalk. They are seen more commonly in the cooler months when the colony heads regenerate.

They are found in sediments, on reefs, in sea grass meadows and sponge gardens to depths of 25 m.
