= Sycozoa seiziwadai =

Scientific classification
- Domain: Eukaryota
- Kingdom: Animalia
- Phylum: Chordata
- Subphylum: Tunicata
- Class: Ascidiacea
- Order: Aplousobranchia
- Family: Holozoidae
- Genus: Sycozoa
- Species: S. seiziwadai

Binomial name
- Sycozoa seiziwadai Tokioka, 1952

Species of tunicate

Sycozoa seiziwadai is a species of is a sea squirt in the family Holozoidae, first described by Takasi Tokioka in 1952.

== Description ==
Sycozoa seiziwadai consists of a colony of colourless zooids in paired vertical rows with the cloaca at the distal end of each pair.

== Range and habitat ==
It is found in coastal waters from Queensland, the Northern Territoryto Western Australia, and off the Philippines., in subtidal waters

== Etymology ==
The species epithet, seiziwadai, honours Seizi Wada, the collector of the type specimen in the Arafura Sea.
