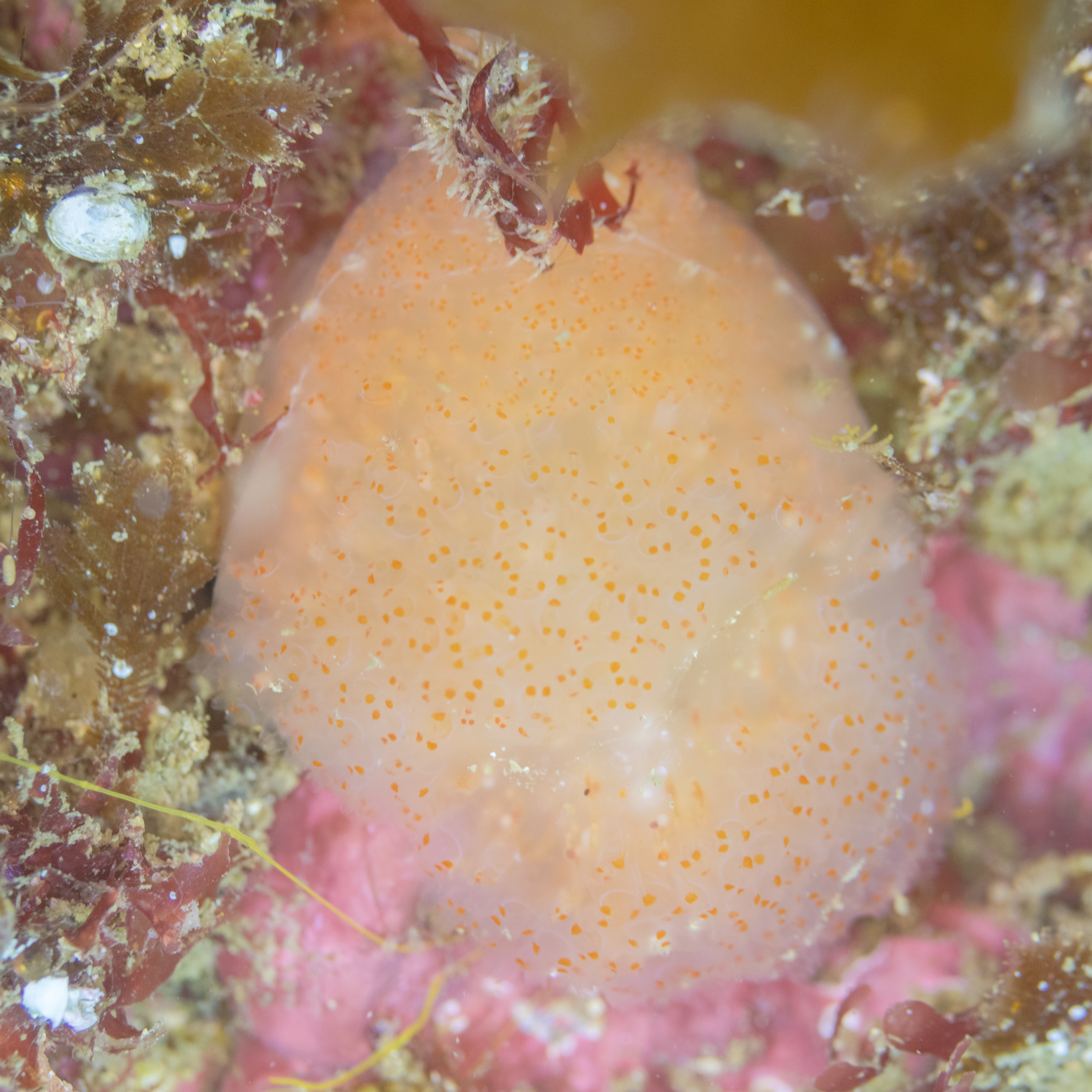
- Pseudodistoma cyrnusense

Scientific classification
- Domain: Eukaryota
- Kingdom: Animalia
- Phylum: Chordata
- Subphylum: Tunicata
- Class: Ascidiacea
- Order: Aplousobranchia
- Family: Pseudodistomidae; Harant, 1931

= Pseudodistomidae =

Family of tunicates

Pseudodistomidae is a family of tunicates belonging to the order Aplousobranchia.

Genera:

- Anadistoma Kott, 1992
- Citorclinum Monniot & Millar, 1988
- Pseudodistoma Michaelsen, 1924
