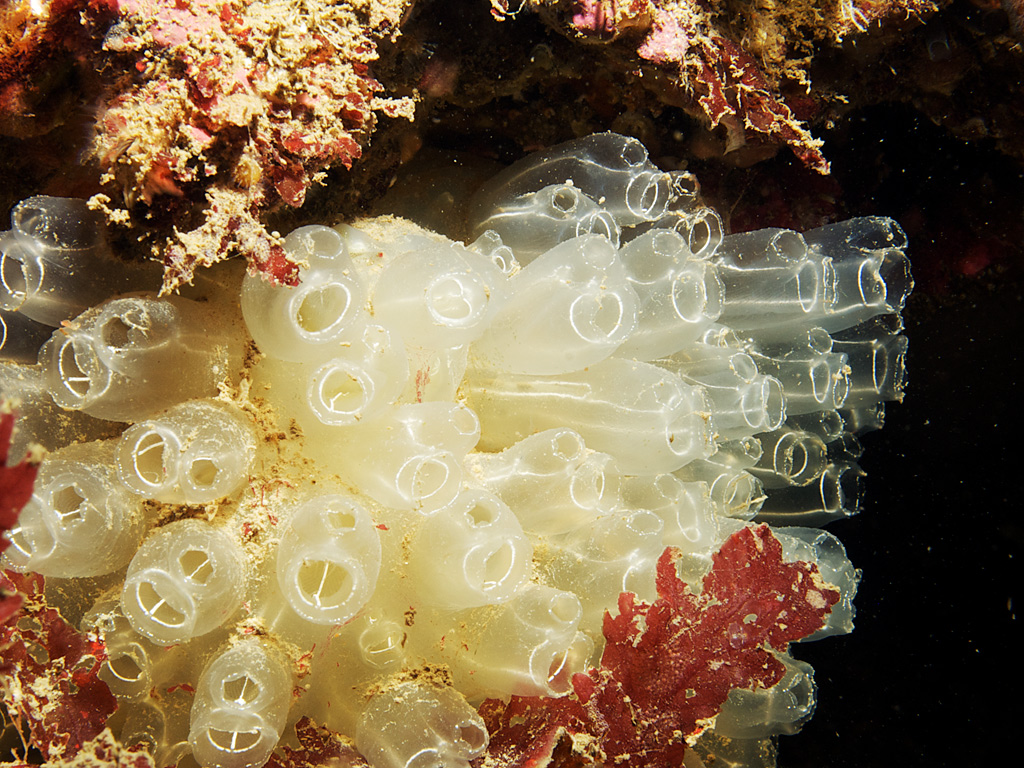
- The ascidian Diazona violacea, Firth of Lorne, Scotland, 20 m

Scientific classification
- Kingdom: Animalia
- Phylum: Chordata
- Subphylum: Tunicata
- Class: Ascidiacea
- Order: Aplousobranchia
- Family: Diazonidae
- Genus: Diazona
- Species: D. violacea

Binomial name
- Diazona violacea Savigny, 1816

Synonyms
- Diazona hebridica (Forbes, 1853); Syntethys hebridica Forbes & Goodsir, 1853

= Diazona violacea =

Species of sea squirt

Diazona violacea is a species of tunicate, an ascidian in the family Diazonidae. It is the type species of the genus Diazona.

== Distribution ==
This species is known from the northeast Atlantic from the British Isles to Portugal, and in the Mediterranean Sea. In the British Isles it is found off Scotland, Ireland and SW England. It is a cold water species found below 30 m in Plymouth but as shallow as 15 m in Scotland.

== Description ==
This colonial ascidian is translucent grey with transparent zooids. The zooids are marked with white internal lines and circles and there are typically six spots around the exhalant siphon.
