= Pseudokamosia =

Pseudokamosia meridionalis

Scientific classification
- Kingdom: Animalia
- Phylum: Arthropoda
- Class: Insecta
- Order: Coleoptera
- Suborder: Polyphaga
- Infraorder: Elateriformia
- Family: Buprestidae
- Genus: Pseudokamosia; Thery, 1932
- Species: P. meridionalis

Binomial name
- Pseudokamosia meridionalis (Kerremans, 1898)

Synonyms
- Kamosia meridionalis; Demostis plicipennis; Pseudokamosia mossopi; Pseudokamosia plicipennis

Genus of beetles

Pseudokamosia is a monotypic genus of beetles in the family Buprestidae, the jewel beetles. The sole species is Pseudokamosia meridionalis. It is native to Africa.
