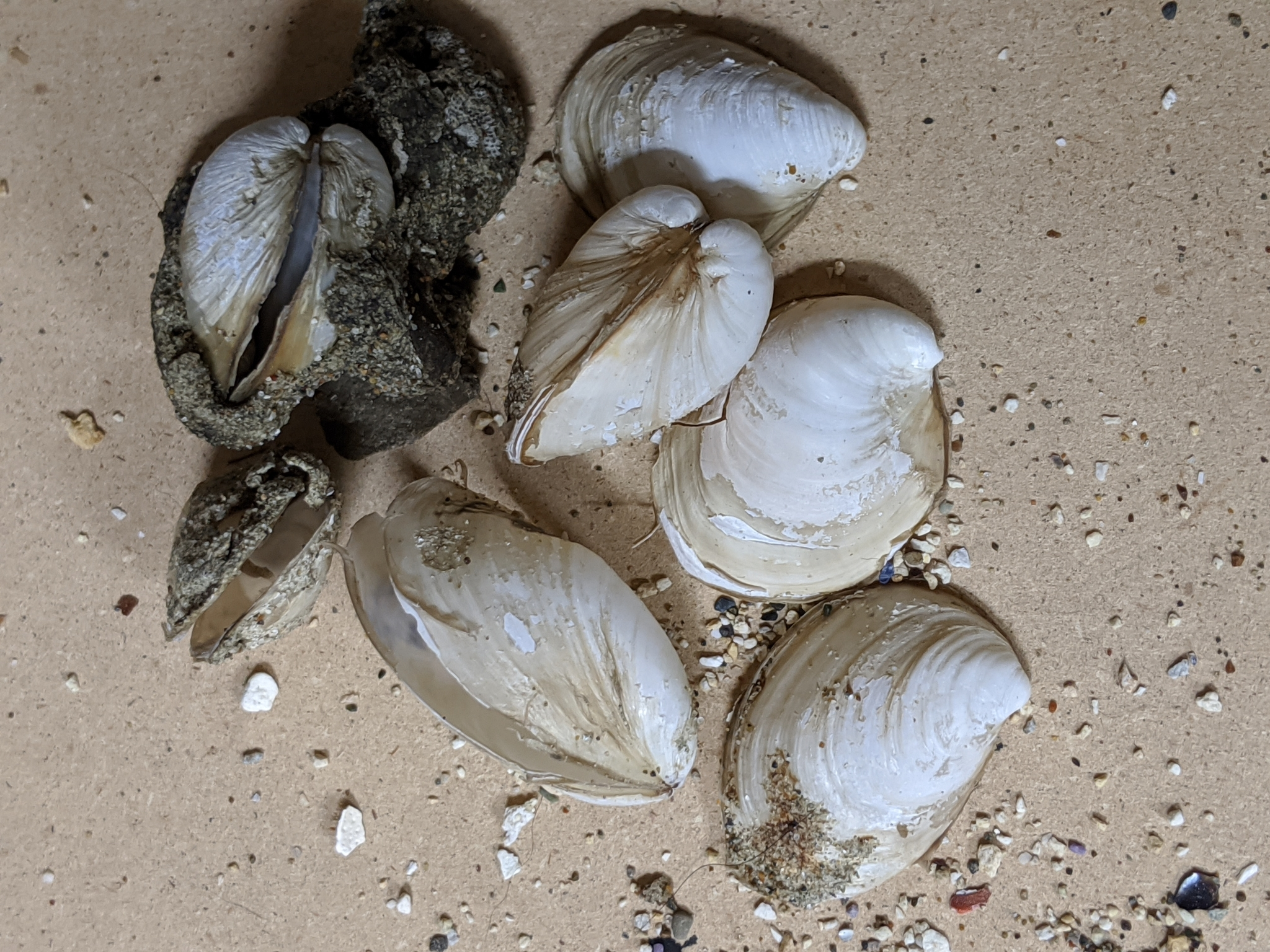

Scientific classification
- Kingdom: Animalia
- Phylum: Mollusca
- Class: Bivalvia
- Family: Lyonsiidae
- Genus: Mytilimeria
- Species: M. nuttalli

Binomial name
- Mytilimeria nuttalli Conrad, 1837

= Mytilimeria nuttalli =

Species of mollusc

Mytilimeria nuttalli, commonly known as the bladder clam or the sea bottle clam, is a species of marine bivalve mollusk in the family Lyonsiidae. It embeds itself in ascidian colonies, and can be found from the low intertidal to depths of 40 m, from Forester Island, Alaska to Isla Coronado, Baja California.

== Description ==
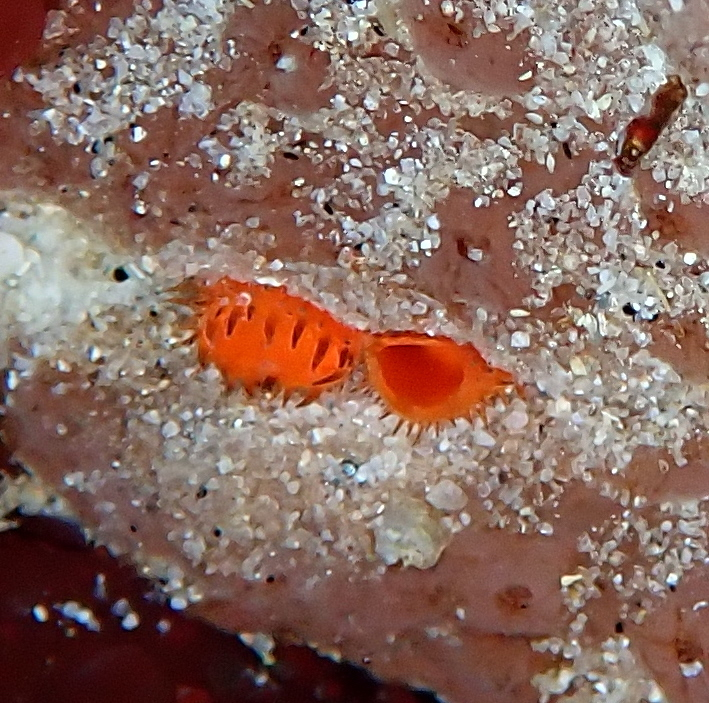
Mytilimeria nuttalli embedded the colonial ascidian Eudistoma psammion, Monterey County, CA

Unlike most clams that live in sandy or rocky substrates, Mytilimeria nuttalli clams are usually embedded in colonies of compound ascidians with only their siphons exposed. Larvae settle on the ascidian colony and eventually become surrounded, except for a narrow slit for the siphons. Because the shells are protected under the surface, they are thin and fragile, and often crack when dried. If they are removed from their ascidian hosts, the periostracum tends to peel from the shell. The shell tends to be around 2 cm, but can reach 4 cm in length, and have a pearly interior.
