= Théry =

Thery may refer to:

== Given name ==
- Théry Schir (born 1993), Swiss professional racing cyclist

== Surname ==
- André Théry (1864-1947), French entomologist
- Clotilde Théry, French cell biologist
- Gerard Thery (1933-2021), French engineer and computer scientist
- Jacques Théry (1881-1970), French novelist and screenwriter
- Léon Théry (1879-1909), French racing driver
