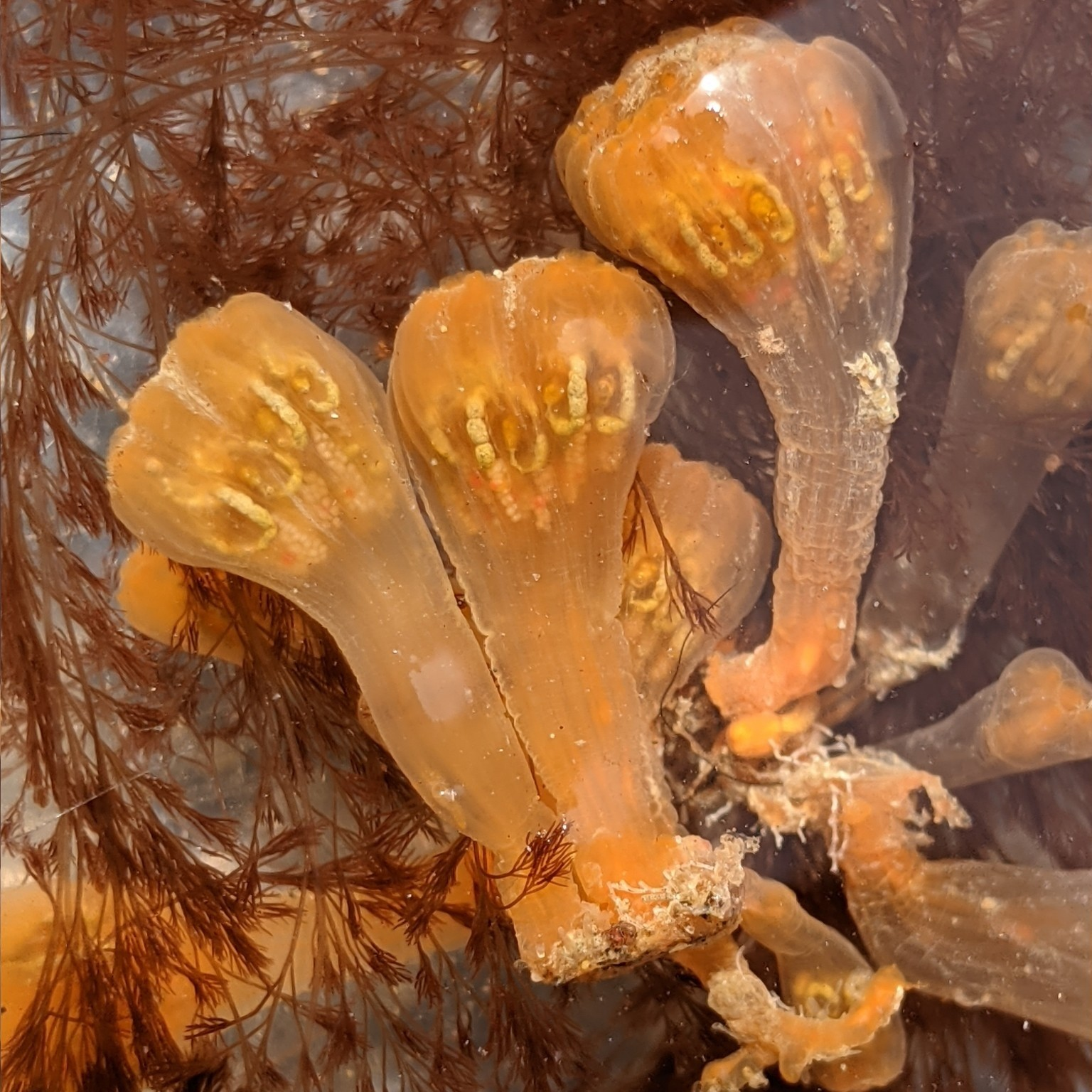
- Ritterella pulchra

Scientific classification
- Domain: Eukaryota
- Kingdom: Animalia
- Phylum: Chordata
- Subphylum: Tunicata
- Class: Ascidiacea
- Order: Aplousobranchia
- Family: Ritterellidae; Kott, 1992

= Ritterellidae =

Family of sea squirts

Ritterellidae is a family of tunicates belonging to the order Aplousobranchia.

== Genera ==
The following genera are recognised in the family Ritterellidae:

- Dumus Brewin, 1952
- Pharyngodictyon Herdman, 1886
- Ritterella Harant, 1931
