= Sigillina =

Scientific classification
- Domain: Eukaryota
- Kingdom: Animalia
- Phylum: Chordata
- Subphylum: Tunicata
- Class: Ascidiacea
- Order: Aplousobranchia
- Family: Holozoidae
- Genus: Sigillina; Savigny, 1816

Genus of tunicates

Sigillina is a genus of tunicates belonging to the family Holozoidae.

The species of this genus are found in coasts of Australia, Malesia, South Africa, Southernmost South America.

Species:

- Sigillina australis Savigny, 1816
- Sigillina cyanea (Herdman, 1899)
- Sigillina digitata (Millar, 1962)
- Sigillina exigua Kott, 2006
- Sigillina fantasiana (Kott, 1957)
- Sigillina grandissima Kott, 1990
- Sigillina magalhaensis (Michaelsen, 1907)
- Sigillina moebiusi (Hartmeyer, 1905)
- Sigillina nigra (Herdman, 1899)
- Sigillina pulvinus Kott, 2003
- Sigillina signifera (Sluiter, 1909)
- Sigillina vasta Millar, 1962
