= Adolphe Hoffmann =

French entomologist who specialized in the families Curculionidae

Adolphe Hoffmann (1889-1967) was a French entomologist. From 1950 he was considered the European specialist in the families Curculionidae, Bruchidae and Scolytidae.He was a Member of the Entomological Society of France . His collection of beetles is today at the National Museum of Natural History, France in Paris.

== Works ==
- Faune de France Volume n° 44 - Coléoptères Bruchides et Anthribides, 1945
- Faune de France Volume n° 52- Coléoptères Curculionides. 1re partie. 1950, 486 p.
- Faune de France Volume n° 59- Coléoptères Curculionides. 2e partie. 1954
- Faune de France Volume n° 62 - Coléoptères Curculionides. 3e|partie. 1958, 632 p. (réimpression 1999)

== See also ==
- fr:Aphodius arvernicus
