= Eucoelium =

Scientific classification
- Domain: Eukaryota
- Kingdom: Animalia
- Phylum: Chordata
- Subphylum: Tunicata
- Class: Ascidiacea
- Order: Aplousobranchia
- Family: Polycitoridae
- Genus: Eucoelium; Savigny, 1816

Genus of sea squirts

Eucoelium is a genus of tunicates belonging to the family Polycitoridae.

The species of this genus are found in Australia and Southern Africa.

Species:

- Eucoelium coronarium (Monniot, 1988)
- Eucoelium hospitiolum Savigny, 1816
- Eucoelium mariae (Michaelsen, 1924)
- Eucoelium orientalis (Kott, 1990)
- Eucoelium pallidus (Millar, 1962)
- Eucoelium peresi (Plante & Vasseur, 1966)
- Eucoelium setoensis (Nishikawa, 1980)
- Eucoelium stelliferum (Monniot & Monniot, 2001)
