= Vitrumidae =

Scientific classification
- Domain: Eukaryota
- Kingdom: Animalia
- Phylum: Chordata
- Subphylum: Tunicata
- Class: Ascidiacea
- Order: Aplousobranchia
- Family: Vitrumidae; Kott, 2009
- Genus: Vitrum; Kott, 2009

Family of sea squirts

The Vitrumidae is a family of tunicates in the order Aplousobranchia. The family of vitrumids consists of a single genus, Vitrum.
