= Euherdmania =

Scientific classification
- Domain: Eukaryota
- Kingdom: Animalia
- Phylum: Chordata
- Subphylum: Tunicata
- Class: Ascidiacea
- Order: Aplousobranchia
- Family: Euherdmaniidae; Ritter, 1904
- Genus: Euherdmania; Ritter, 1904

Synonyms
- Euherdmannia

Genus of tunicates

Euherdmannia is a genus of tunicates. It is the only genus in the family Euherdmaniidae in the order Aplousobranchia.

== Species ==
Species accepted by WoRMS as of May 2023:

- Euherdmania areolata Millar, 1978
- Euherdmania claviformis (Ritter, 1903)
- Euherdmania dentatosiphonis (Millar, 1975)
- Euherdmania digitata Millar, 1963
- Euherdmania divida Monniot C., Monniot F., Griffiths & Schleyer, 2001
- Euherdmania dumosa Monniot F., 1987
- Euherdmania fasciculata Monniot F., 1983
- Euherdmania morgani Millar & Goodbody, 1974
- Euherdmania rodei Peres, 1949
- Euherdmania solida Millar, 1953
- Euherdmania translucida Kott, 1992
- Euherdmania vitrea Millar, 1961
