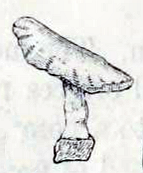
- Pharyngodictyon mirabile

Scientific classification
- Domain: Eukaryota
- Kingdom: Animalia
- Phylum: Chordata
- Subphylum: Tunicata
- Class: Ascidiacea
- Order: Aplousobranchia
- Family: Ritterellidae
- Genus: Pharyngodictyon; Herdman, 1886

= Pharyngodictyon =

Genus of sea squirts

Pharyngodictyon is a genus of tunicates belonging to the family Ritterellidae.

The species of this genus are found in southern parts of Southern Hemisphere.

Species:

- Pharyngodictyon bisinus Monniot & Monniot, 1991
- Pharyngodictyon cauliformis Monniot & Monniot, 1991
- Pharyngodictyon elongatum Millar, 1982
- Pharyngodictyon magnifili Monniot & Monniot, 1991
- Pharyngodictyon mirabile Herdman, 1886
- Pharyngodictyon reductum Sluiter, 1906
