= Placentela =

Scientific classification
- Domain: Eukaryota
- Kingdom: Animalia
- Phylum: Chordata
- Subphylum: Tunicata
- Class: Ascidiacea
- Order: Aplousobranchia
- Family: Placentelidae; Kott, 1992
- Genus: Placentela; Redikorzev, 1913

Genus of sea squirts

Placentelidae is a family of tunicates belonging to the order Aplousobranchia. It contains a single genus, Placentela.
