= Stomozoa =

Scientific classification
- Domain: Eukaryota
- Kingdom: Animalia
- Phylum: Chordata
- Subphylum: Tunicata
- Class: Ascidiacea
- Order: Aplousobranchia
- Family: Stomozoidae; Kott, 1990
- Genus: Stomozoa; Kott, 1957

Genus of sea squirts

Stomozoa is a genus of tunicates. It is the only genus in the family Stomozoidae in the order Aplousobranchia. The family of stomozoids was described by Patricia Kott in 1990.
