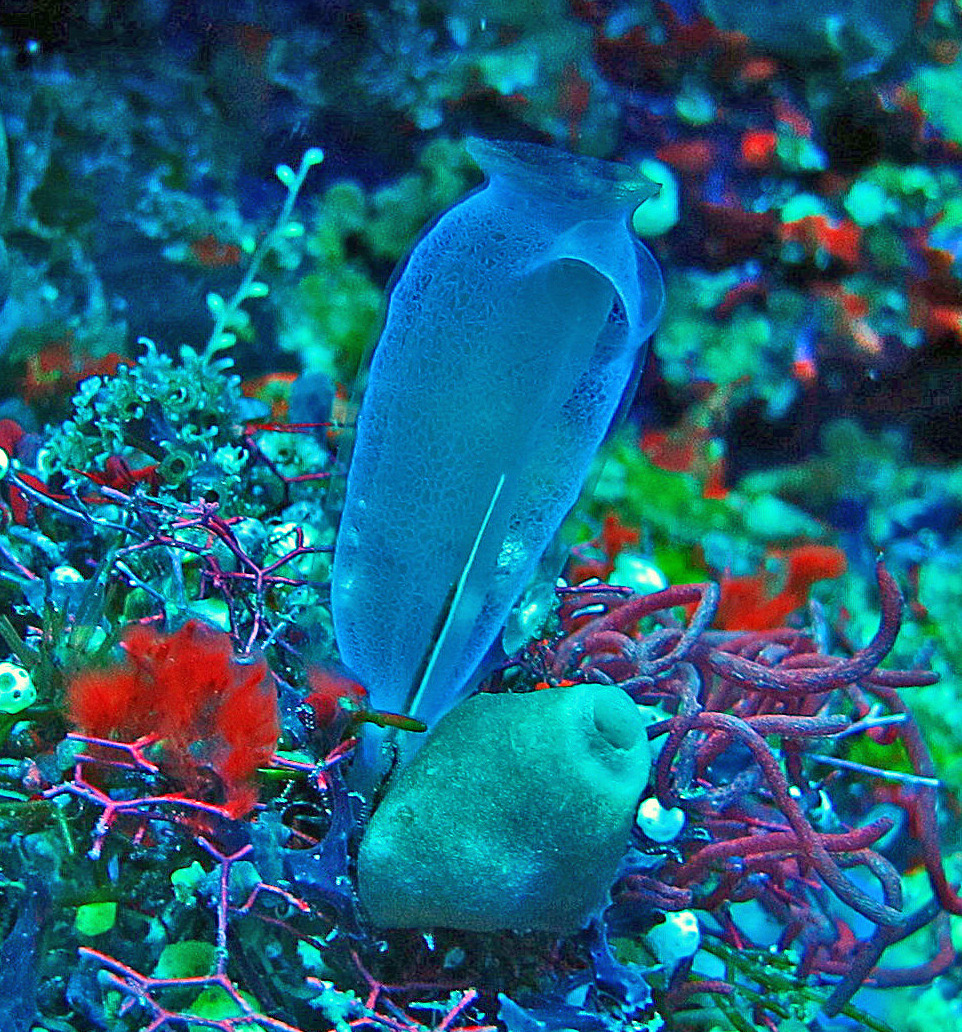
- A common, but undescribed Rhopalaea species in the Philippines

Scientific classification
- Domain: Eukaryota
- Kingdom: Animalia
- Phylum: Chordata
- Subphylum: Tunicata
- Class: Ascidiacea
- Order: Aplousobranchia
- Family: Diazonidae
- Genus: Rhopalaea; Philippi, 1843

Species
- 21 species (see text)

Synonyms
- Rhopalona Roule, 1886 (unnecessary nomen novum for Rhopalaea); Rhopalopsis Herdman, 1890

= Rhopalaea =

Genus of sea squirts

Rhopalaea is a genus of tunicates belonging to the family Diazonidae. The genus has a cosmopolitan distribution in warm and temperate oceans.

== Species ==
The genus Rhopalaea has 21 recognized species:

- Rhopalaea abdominalis (Sluiter, 1898)
- Rhopalaea bilobata Mondal J., Raghunathan & Mondal T., 2017
- Rhopalaea birkelandi Tokioka, 1971
- Rhopalaea circula Monniot F. & Monniot C., 2001
- Rhopalaea cloneyi Vazquez & Young, 1996
- Rhopalaea crassa (Herdman, 1880)
- Rhopalaea defecta (Sluiter, 1904)
- Rhopalaea desme Monniot F., 2003
- Rhopalaea flemingi (Herdman, 1880)
- Rhopalaea fusca (Herdman, 1880)
- Rhopalaea hartmeyeri (Salfi, 1927)
- Rhopalaea idoneta Shenkar, 2013
- Rhopalaea macrothorax Tokioka, 1953
- Rhopalaea meridionalis Kott, 2006
- Rhopalaea neapolitana Philippi, 1843
- Rhopalaea orientalis (Pérès, 1958)
- Rhopalaea perlucida Monniot C., 1997
- Rhopalaea piru Monniot C. & Monniot F., 1987
- Rhopalaea respiciens Monniot C., 1991
- Rhopalaea sagamiana Oka, 1927
- Rhopalaea tenuis (Sluiter, 1904)
