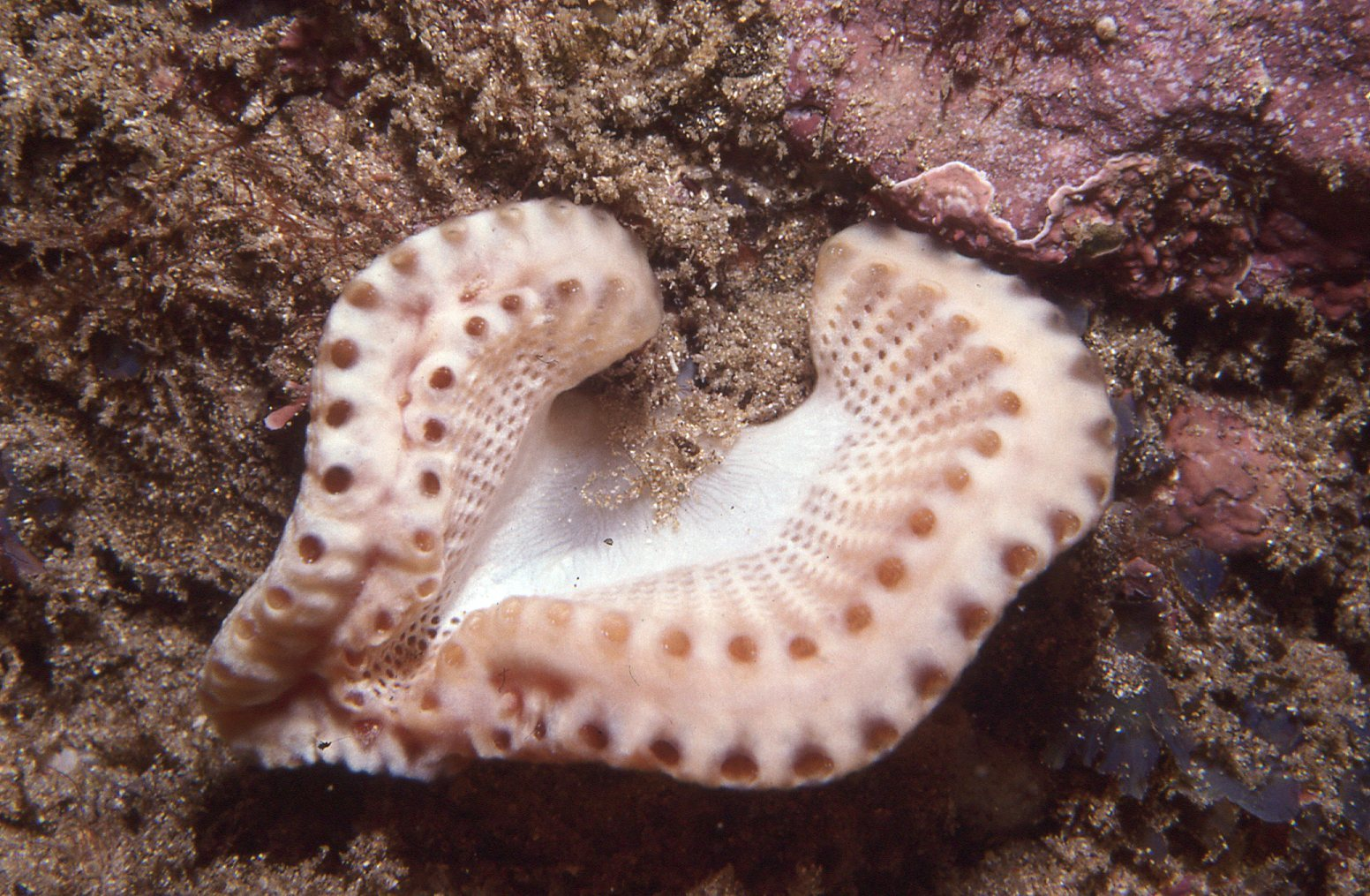
- Sycozoa cerebriformis

Scientific classification
- Kingdom: Animalia
- Phylum: Chordata
- Subphylum: Tunicata
- Class: Ascidiacea
- Order: Aplousobranchia
- Family: Holozoidae
- Genus: Sycozoa; Lesson, 1832

= Sycozoa =

Genus of tunicates

Sycozoa is a genus of tunicates belonging to the family Holozoidae.

The species of this genus are found in Southern Hemisphere.

== Species ==
Species:

- Sycozoa anomala Millar, 1960
- Sycozoa arborescens Hartmeyer, 1912
- Sycozoa brevicauda Kott, 1990
- Sycozoa cavernosa Kott, 1990
- Sycozoa cerebriformis (Quoy & Gaimard, 1834)
- Sycozoa pedunculata (Quoy & Gaimard, 1834)
- Sycozoa pulchra (Herdman, 1886)
- Sycozoa seiziwadai Tokioka, 1952
- Sycozoa sigillinoides Lesson, 1832
