= Faune de France (book series) =

Faune de France is a 99 volume synthesis of Zoology of France published between 1921 and 1999. The books are written in the French language. They contain identification keys.

Launched in 1921 by the French Federation of Natural Science Societies, the Faune de France collection was published from 1921 to 1966 (nos.1 to 68) by Lechevalier editions (Paris: Éditions Faune de France), in collaboration, in particular, with the National Museum of Natural History, the National Center for Scientific Research (CNRS) and the National Institute for Agronomic Research (INRA). Publications were interrupted from 1967 to 1982. In 1983, the collection made a second start, the French Federation of Natural Science Societies directly becoming the publisher. From 1983 to 2015, volumes 69 to 97 were produced.

With the advent of the internet and in accordance with its statutes, the Federation has decided to create a digital virtual library and graciously makes available to the naturalist community all the out of print (épuisé) works in the collection and which it does not wish to republish (see at the bottom of the page).

== Volumes ==
- Volume n° 1 - Jean Baptiste François René Koehler (1860-1931) - Échinodermes. 1921. épuisé
- Volume n° 2 - Paul Paris (1875-1938) - Oiseaux. 1921. épuisé
- Volume n° 3 - Lucien Chopard (1885-1971) - Orthoptères et Dermaptères. 1922. épuisé
- Volume n° 4 - Lucien Cuénot (1866-1951) - Sipunculiens, Échiuriens, Priapuliens. 1922. épuisé
- Volume n° 5 - Pierre Fauvel (1866-1958) - Polychètes errantes. 1923. épuisé
- Volume n° 6 - Eugène Séguy (1890-1985) - Diptères Anthomyides (includes Muscidae). 1923. épuisé
- Volume n° 7 - Eugène Louis Bouvier (1856-1944) - Pycnogonides. 1923. épuisé
- Volume n° 8 - Claude Pierre (1875-1934) - Diptères : Tipulidae. 1924, 159 p.
- Volume n° 9 - Édouard Chevreux (1846-1931) et Louis Fage (1883-1964) - Amphipodes. 1924 épuisé
- Volume n° 10 - Lucien Berland (1888-1962) - Hyménoptères vespiformes; I. 1925 épuisé
- Volume n° 11 - Jean-Jacques Kieffer (1857-1925) - Diptères Nématocères piqueurs : Chironomidae, Ceratopogoninae. 1925, 139 p.
- Volume n° 12 - Eugène Séguy (1890-1985) - Diptères Nématocères piqueurs : Ptychopteridae, Orphnephilidae.... 1925, 109 p.
- Volume n° 13 - Eugène Séguy (1890-1985) - Diptères Brachycères : Stratiomyidae, Erinnidae, Coenomyiidae, Syrphidae.... 1926, 308 p. épuisé
- Volume n° 14 - Louis Falcoz (1870-1938) - Diptères pupipares. 1926, 64 p.
- Volume n° 15 - Maurice Emile Marie Goetghebuer (1876-1962) - Diptères Nématocères. Chironomidae II, Tanypodinae. 1927, 83 p.
- Volume n° 16 - Pierre Fauvel (1866-1958) - Polychètes sédentaires. 1927. épuisé
- Volume n° 17 - Eugène Séguy (1890-1985) - Diptères Brachycères. Asilidae. 1927, 188 p. épuisé
- Volume n° 18 - Maurice Emile Marie Goetghebuer (1876-1962) - Diptères Nématocères. Chironomidae III, Chironomariae. 1928, 174 p.
- Volume n° 19 - Lucien Berland (1888-1962) - Hyménoptères vespiformes : II, 1928 épuisé
- Volume n° 20 - François Picard (1879-1939) - Coléoptères Cérambycidae; 1929, 168 p. épuisé
- Volume n° 21 - Louis Germain (1878-1942) - Mollusques terrestres et fluviatiles : I; 1930 épuisé
- Volume n° 22 - Louis Germain (1878-1942) - Mollusques terrestres et fluviatiles : II; 1931 épuisé
- Volume n° 23 - Maurice Emile Marie Goetghebuer (1876-1962) - Diptères Nématocères. Chironomidae IV; 1932 épuisé
- Volume n° 24 - Lucien Cuénot (1866-1951) - Tardigrades, 1932 épuisé
- Volume n° 25 - Henri W. Brölemann (1860-1933) - Myriapodes Chilopodes, 1930 épuisé
- Volume n° 26 - Maurice Rose (1882-1969) - Copépodes pélagiques, 1933 - épuisé
- Volume n° 27 - Hervé Harant (1901-1986) et Paulette Vernières - Tuniciers I, 1933 épuisé
- Volume n° 28 - Eugène Séguy (1890-1985) - Diptères Brachycères, 1934 épuisé II. Muscidae acalypterae, Scatophagidae.
- Volume n° 29 - Henri W. Brölemann (1860-1933) - Myriapodes diplopodes; Chilognathes, I; 1935 épuisé
- Volume n° 30 - Charles Joyeux (1881-1966) et Jean Georges Baer (1902-1975) - Cestodes, 1939 - épuisé
- Volume n° 31 - Henri Ribaut (1872-1967) - Homoptères Auchénorhynques. I. Typhlocybidae. 1936, 231 p. (réimpression 1986)
- Volume n° 32 - Georges Senevet (1891-1973) - Ixodidés. 1937, 104 p.
- Volume n° 33 - Hervé Harant (1901-1986) et Paulette Vernières - Tuniciers II : Appendiculaires et Thaliacés, 1938, 60 p.
- Volume n° 34 - Lucien Berland (1888-1962) et Francis Bernard (1908-1990) - Hyménoptères vespiformes : III; 1938. épuisé
- Volume n° 35 - Octave Parent (1882-1942) - Diptères Dolichopodidae, 1938. épuisé
- Volume n° 36 - Eugène Séguy (1890-1985) - Diptères Nématocères, 1940. épuisé
- Volume n° 37 - Eugène Louis Bouvier (1856-1944) - Décapodes : I, Marcheurs, 1940. épuisé
- Volume n° 38 - Renaud Paulian (1913-2003) - Coléoptères Scarabeidés, 1941. épuisé
- Volume n° 39 - René Jeannel (1879-1965) - Coléoptères Carabiques. Tome I, 1941, 571 p. épuisé
- Volume n° 40 - René Jeannel (1879-1965) - Coléoptères Carabiques. Tome II, 1942, 600 p. épuisé
- Volume n° 41 - André Théry (1864-1947) - Coléoptères Buprestides. 1942, 221 p., 149 fig. (réimpression 1999) épuisé
- Volume n° 42 - André Badonnel (1898-1991) - Psocoptères. 1943. épuisé
- Volume n° 43 - Eugène Séguy (1890-1985) - Insectes ectoparasites. Mallophages, Anoploures, Siphonaptères. 1944. épuisé
- Volume n° 44 - Adolphe Hoffmann (1889-1967) - Coléoptères Bruchides et Anthribides, 1945 épuisé
- Volume n° 45 - Fernand Angel (1881-1950) - Reptiles et Amphibiens. 1946, 204 p., 375 fig.; (réimpression 1970). épuisé
- Volume n° 46 - Marc André (1900-1966) - Halacariens marins. 1946, 152 p., 265 fig. épuisé
- Volume n° 47 - Lucien Berland (1888-1962) - Hyménoptères Tenthrédoïdes. 1947, 496 p. épuisé
- Volume n° 48 - Félix Guignot (1882-1959) - Coléoptères Hydrocanthares. 1947. épuisé
- Volume n° 49 - Pierre Viette (1921-2011) - Lépidoptères Homoneures. 1948, 83 p.
- Volume n° 50 - Alfred Serge Balachowsky (1901-1983) - Coléoptères Scolytides. 1949, 320 p. (réimpression 1997). épuisé
- Volume n° 51 - René Jeannel (1879-1965) - Coléoptères Carabiques. Supplément. 1949, 51 p.
- Volume n° 52 - Adolphe Hoffmann (1889-1967) - Coléoptères Curculionides. 1st part. 1950, 486 p.
- Volume n° 53 - René Jeannel (1879-1965) - Coléoptères Psélaphides. 1950, 422 p.
- Volume n° 54 - Louis Fage (1883-1964) - Cumacés. 1951, 136 p.
- Volume n° 55 - Raymond Justin Marie Despax (1886-1950) - Plécoptères. 1951, 280 p.
- Volume n° 56 - Lucien Chopard (1885-1971) - Orthoptéroïdes. 1951. épuisé
- Volume n° 57 - Henri Ribaut (1872-1967) - Homoptères Auchénorhynque II. Jassidae. 1952, 474 p. (réimpression 2000)
- Volume n° 58 - Alice Pruvot-Fol (1873-1972) - Mollusques Opistobranches. 1954, 460 p., 1 pl., 173 fig. épuisé
- Volume n° 59 - Adolphe Hoffmann (1889-1967). - Coléoptères Curculionides. 2nd. 1954, (réimpression 1986) épuisé
- Volume n° 60 - Marcel Prenant (1893-1983) et Geneviève Bobin (1912-1989) - Bryozoaires, 1st part : Entroproctes, Cténostomes. 1956, 398 p.
- Volume n° 61 - Raymond Alfred Poisson (1895-1973) - Hétéroptères aquatiques. 1957, 263 p. épuisé
- Volume n° 62 - Adolphe Hoffmann (1889-1967) - Coléoptères Curculionides. 3rd part. 1958, 632 p. (réimpression 1999) épuisé
- Volume n° 63 - Renaud Paulian (1913-2003) - Coléoptères Scarabéides. Second edition. 1959, 298 p.
- Volume n° 64 - Albert Vandel (1894-1980) - Isopodes terrestres. 1st part. 1960, 416 p.
- Volume n° 65 - Charles Jacques Spillmann (1902-1982) - Poissons d'eau douce. 1961, 303 p. (réimpression 1989)
- Volume n° 66 - Albert Vandel (1894-1980) - Isopodes terrestres. 2nd part. 1962, 514 p.
- Volume n° 67 - Eduard Wagner (1896-1978) et Hermann Weber (1899-1956) - Hétéroptères Miridae. 1964, 592 p. (réimpression 1999)
- Volume n° 68 - Marcel Prenant (1893-1983) et Geneviève Bobin (1912-1989) - Bryozoaires. 2nd part. Chilostomes, Anasca. 1966, 647 p.
- Volume n° 69 - Jean Péricart (1928-2011) - Hémiptères Tingidae euro-méditerranéens. 1983, 618 p.
- Volume n° 70 - Jean Péricart (1928-2011) - Hémiptères Berytidae euro-méditerranéens. 1984, 172 p.
- Volume n° 71 - Jean Péricart (1928-2011) - Hémiptères Nabidae d'Europe occidentale et du Maghreb. 1987, 186 p.
- Volume n° 72 - Jean-Claude Vala - Diptères Sciomyzidae euro-méditerranéens. 1989, 300 p.
- Volume n° 73 - William della Giustina (1936-) - Homoptères Cicadellidae (supplément). 1989, 350 p. épuisé
- Volume n° 74 - Gaston Tempère (1900-1985) et Jean Péricart (1928-2011) - Coléoptères Curculionidae. 4th part. 1989, 534 p.
- Volume n° 75 - Claude Caussanel (1933-1999) et Vincent Albouy (1959-) - Dermaptères (Perce-oreilles). 1990, 245 p.
- Volume n° 76 - Jean-Claude Beaucournu (1934-) et Henri Launay (1950-) - Siphonaptères de France et de médit. occ. 1990, 548 p.
- Volume n° 77 - Jean Péricart (1928-2011) - Hémiptères Leptopodidae et Saldidae d'Europe occ. et du Maghreb. 1990, 238 p.
- Volume n° 78 - Jacques Baraud (1921-1992) - Coléoptères Scarabaeoidea d'Europe. 1992, 856 p. (réimpression 2001)
- Volume n° 79 - Jacques Bitsch (1928-) et Jean Leclercq (1921-) - Hyménoptères Sphecidae d'Europe occidentale. Vol. 1. 1993, 325 p.
- Volume n° 80 - Serge Doguet (1942-) - Coléoptères Chrysomelidae. Vol. 2. : Alticinae, 1994, 694 p.
- Volume n° 81 - Pierre Moulet (1955-) - Hémiptères Coreoidea euro-méditerranéens. 1995, 336 p
- Volume n° 82 - Jacques Bitsch (1928-), Yvan Barbier, Severiano Fernández Gayubo, K. Schmidt, M. Ohl, Hyménoptères Sphecidae d'Europe occidentale. Vol. 2. 1997, 429 p.
- Volume n° 83 - Charles Lienhard (1949-) - Psocoptères euro-méditerranéens. 1998, 517 p.
- Volume n° 84a - Jean Péricart (1928-2011) - Hémiptères Lygaeidae euro-méditerranéens, vol. 1, 1998, xx + 468 p.
- Volume n° 84b - Jean Péricart (1928-2011) - Hémiptères Lygaeidae euro-méditerranéens, vol. 2, 1998, iii + 453 p.
- Volume n° 84c - Jean Péricart (1928-2011) - Hémiptères Lygaeidae euro-méditerranéens, vol. 3, 1998 vi + 487 p.
- Volume n° 85 - Bernard Bordy - Coléoptères Chrysomelidae. Vol. 3 : Hispinae et Cassidinae, 2000, 250 p. épuisé, Réédition 2009
- Volume n° 86 - Jacques Bitsch (1928-), Hermann Dollfuss (1939-), Zdeněk Bouček (1924-), K. Schmidt, Ch. Schmid-Egger, Severiano Fernández Gayubo, A.V. Antropov, Y. Barbier — Hyménoptères Sphecidae d'Europe occidentale. Vol. 3. 2007, seconde édition 479 p.
- Volume n° 87 - Yves Séméria (1956-) - Tardigrades continentaux, 2003, 300 p.
- Volume n° 88 - Daniel Robineau (1938-) - Phoques de France, 2004, 196 p.
- Volume n° 89 - Daniel Robineau (1938-) - Cétacés de France, 2005, 646 p.
- Volume n° 90 - Valeriu Derjanschi et Jean Péricart (1928-2011) - Hémiptères Pentatomoidea, Vol 1, 2005, 494 p.
- Volume n° 91 - Ernst Heiss et Jean Péricart (1928-2011) - Hémiptères Aradidae, Piesmatidae et Dipsocoromorphes, 2007.
- Volume n° 92 - Pavel V. Poutchkov et Pierre Moulet (1955-) - Hémiptères Reduviidae d'Europe, 2009, 688 p.
- Volume n° 93 - Jean Péricart (1928-2011) – Hémiptères Pentatomoidea Euro-Méditerranéens, volume 3 : Podopinae et Asopinae, 2010, 290 p.
- Volume n° 94 - J. Coulon, R. Pupier, E. Queinnec, E. Ollivier & P. Richoux - Coléoptères Carabidae de France, complément et mise à jour (volume 1), 2011, 352 p.
- Volume n° 95 - J. Coulon, R. Pupier, E. Queinnec, E. Ollivier & P. Richoux - Coléoptères Carabidae de France, complément et mise à jour (volume 2), 2011, 337 p.
- Volume n° 96 - Jordi Ribes & Santiago Pagola-Carte - Hémiptères Pentatomoidea Euro-Méditerranéens, volume 2 : Systématique : deuxième partie, sous famille des Pentatominae (suite et fin), 2013, 424 p.
- Volume n° 97 - Bernard Defaut & David Morichon - Criquets de France (Orthoptera, Caelifera), volume 1, fascicules a et b, 2015, 687 p.
- Volume n° 98 - Bruno Gereys - "Vespidae solitaires de France métropolitaine", 2016, 330p
- Volume n° 99 - Voisin J.-F., Chapelin-Viscardi J.-D., Ponel Ph. & Rapp M. - "Les Coléoptères de la province de Kerguelen", 2017, 304p

== See also ==
- Traité de Zoologie
- Synopses of the British Fauna
