= Louis Falcoz =

French naturalist (1870-1938)

Louis Falcoz (1870, Gillonnay, Isère -1938, Villeurbanne) was a French naturalist who specialised in entomology . He wrote Faune de France Volume n° 14 - Diptères pupipares. 1926, 64 p. Louis Falcoz was a Member of the Société linnéenne de Lyon fr:Société linnéenne de Lyon
