= Anadistoma =

Scientific classification
- Domain: Eukaryota
- Kingdom: Animalia
- Phylum: Chordata
- Subphylum: Tunicata
- Class: Ascidiacea
- Order: Aplousobranchia
- Family: Pseudodistomidae
- Genus: Anadistoma; Kott, 1992
- Type locality (AM Y.1315) Montague South, near Eden

Genus of tunicates

Anadistoma is a monotypic genus of tunicates belonging to the order Aplousobranchia. The sole species in this genus is Anadistoma attenuatum Kott, 1992. The species and the genus were first described in 1992 by Patricia Kott.
