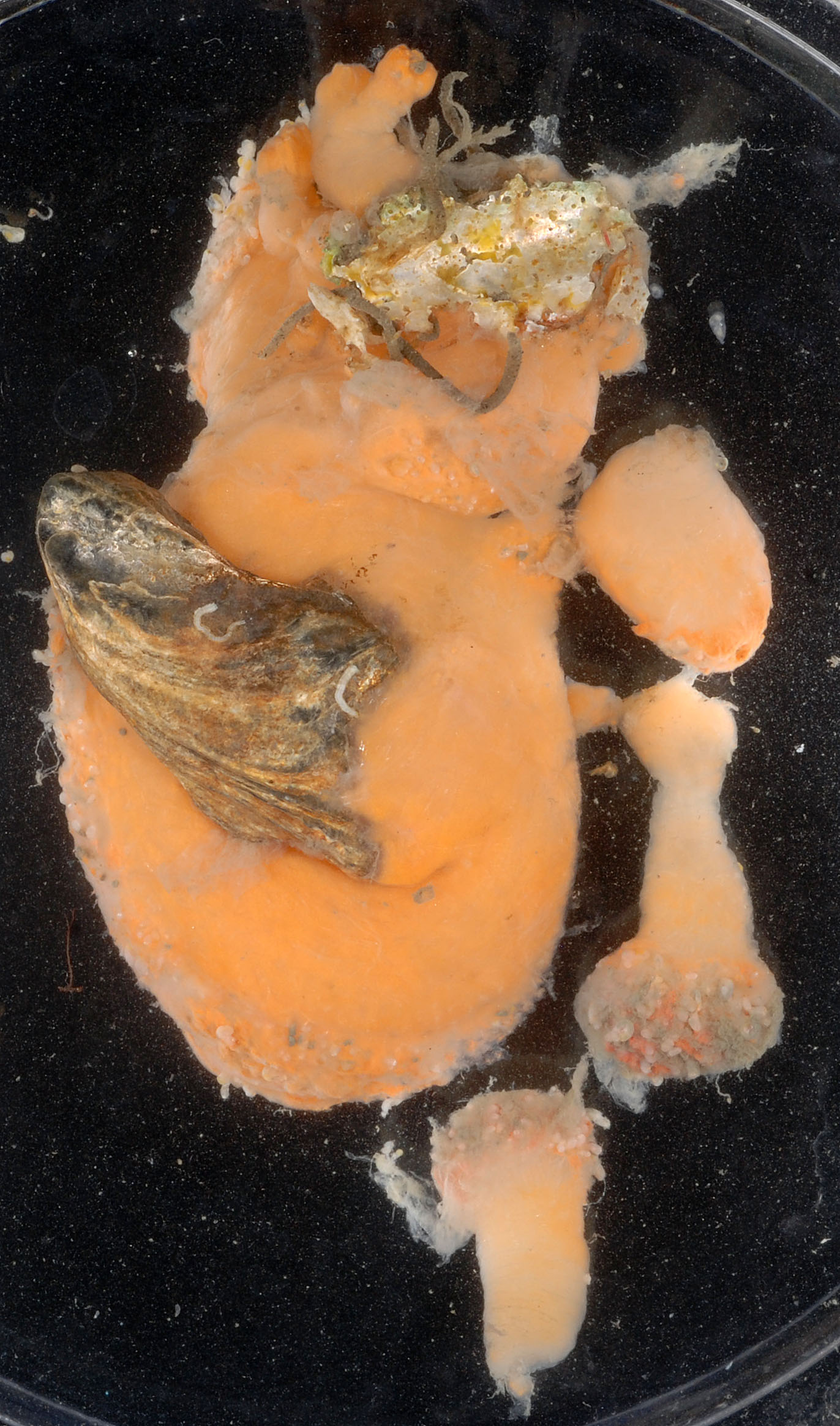
- Distaplia sp.

Scientific classification
- Domain: Eukaryota
- Kingdom: Animalia
- Phylum: Chordata
- Subphylum: Tunicata
- Class: Ascidiacea
- Order: Aplousobranchia
- Family: Holozoidae
- Genus: Distaplia; Della Valle, 1881

= Distaplia =

Genus of sea squirts

Distaplia is a genus of tunicates belonging to the family Holozoidae.

The genus has cosmopolitan distribution.

Species:

- Distaplia alaidi Sanamyan, 1993
- Distaplia alaskensis Lambert & Sanamyan, 2001
- Distaplia arnbackae Sanamyan, Schories & Sanamyan, 2010
- Distaplia australiensis Brewin, 1953
- Distaplia bermudensis Van Name, 1902
- Distaplia caerulea (Peres, 1956)
- Distaplia capensis Michaelsen, 1934
- Distaplia clavata (Sars, 1851)
- Distaplia colligans Sluiter, 1932
- Distaplia concreta (Herdman, 1886)
- Distaplia corolla Monniot F., 1974
- Distaplia crassa Monniot F., 1983
- Distaplia cuscina Kott, 1990
- Distaplia cuspidis Kott, 2002
- Distaplia cylindrica (Lesson, 1830)
- Distaplia dubia (Oka, 1927)
- Distaplia durbanensis Millar, 1964
- Distaplia florida Kott, 1990
- Distaplia fortuita Lagger & Tatián, 2013
- Distaplia galatheae Millar, 1959
- Distaplia garstangi Berrill, 1947
- Distaplia intermedia Heiden, 1893
- Distaplia kerguelense Monniot F., 1970
- Distaplia knoxi Brewin, 1954
- Distaplia livida (Sars, 1851)
- Distaplia lubrica Drasche, 1883
- Distaplia lucillae Mastrototaro & Brunetti, 2006
- Distaplia magnilarva (Della Valle, 1881)
- Distaplia marplesi Brewin, 1952
- Distaplia matua Sanamyan & Sanamyan, 2017
- Distaplia megathorax Monniot C. & Monniot F., 1982
- Distaplia micropnoa Sluiter, 1909
- Distaplia mikropnoa (Sluiter, 1909)
- Distaplia miyose Tokioka, 1962
- Distaplia muriella Kott, 1990
- Distaplia nathensis Meenakshi, 1998
- Distaplia naufragii Lagger & Tatián, 2013
- Distaplia occidentalis Bancroft, 1899
- Distaplia pallida Kott, 1990
- Distaplia progressa Monniot C. & Monniot F., 1991
- Distaplia prolifera Kott, 1990
- Distaplia racemosa Kott, 1990
- Distaplia regina Kott, 1990
- Distaplia retinaculata Kott, 1990
- Distaplia rosea Della Valle, 1881
- Distaplia rzhavskii Sanamyan, 1993
- Distaplia skoogi Michaelsen, 1924
- Distaplia smithi Abbott & Trason, 1968
- Distaplia stylifera (Kowalevsky, 1874)
- Distaplia systematica Tokioka, 1958
- Distaplia tahihuero Monniot C. & Monniot F., 1987
- Distaplia taylori Brewin, 1950
- Distaplia tokiokai Kott, 1990
- Distaplia turboensis Kott, 2004
- Distaplia unigermis Ivanova Kazas, 1965
- Distaplia vallii Herdman, 1886
- Distaplia violetta Kott, 1990
- Distaplia viridis Kott, 1957
