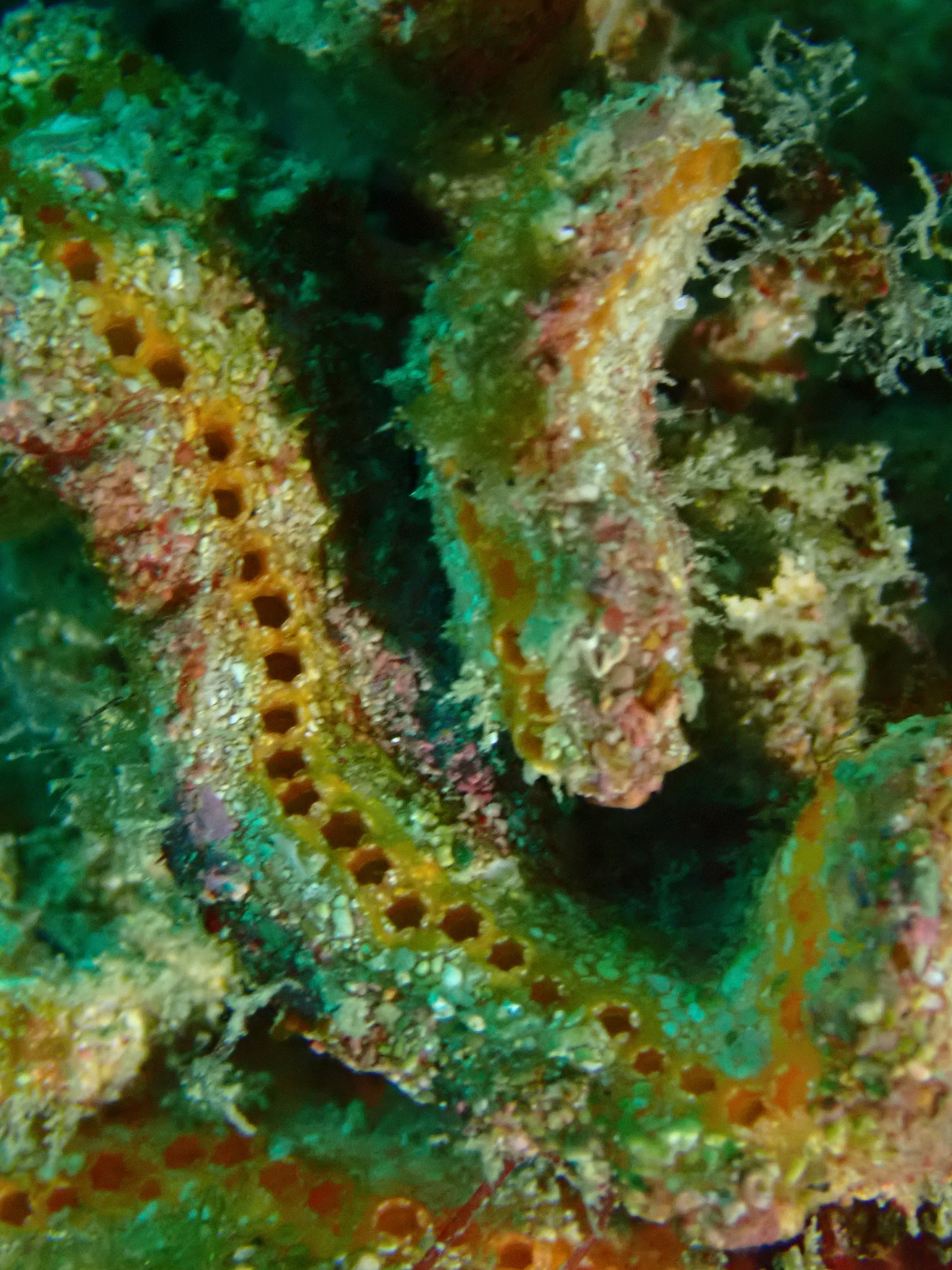
- Condominium areolatum

Scientific classification
- Kingdom: Animalia
- Phylum: Chordata
- Subphylum: Tunicata
- Class: Ascidiacea
- Order: Aplousobranchia
- Family: Protopolyclinidae; Kott, 1992

= Protopolyclinidae =

Family of tunicates

Protopolyclinidae is a family of tunicates belonging to the order Aplousobranchia.

Genera:

- Condominium Kott, 1992
- Monniotus Millar, 1988
- Protopolyclinum Millar, 1960
