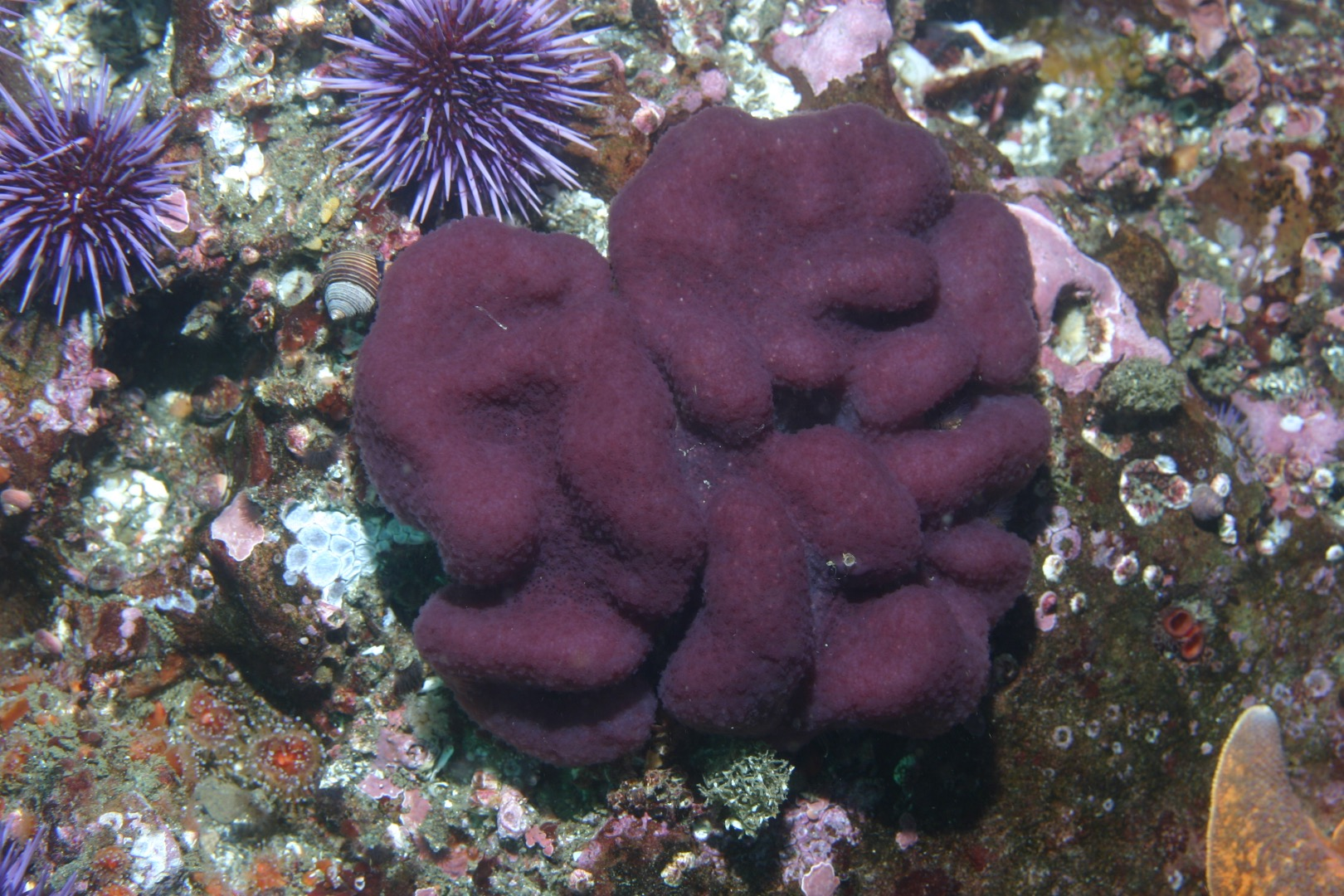
- Cystodytes lobatus

Scientific classification
- Domain: Eukaryota
- Kingdom: Animalia
- Phylum: Chordata
- Subphylum: Tunicata
- Class: Ascidiacea
- Order: Aplousobranchia
- Family: Polycitoridae
- Genus: Cystodytes; Drasche, 1884

= Cystodytes =

Genus of tunicates

Cystodytes is a genus of tunicates belonging to the family Polycitoridae.

The genus has cosmopolitan distribution.

Species:

- Cystodytes antarcticus Sluiter, 1912
- Cystodytes dellechiajei (Della Valle, 1877)
- Cystodytes denudatus Peres, 1953
- Cystodytes durus Drasche, 1883
- Cystodytes fuscus Monniot F., 1988
- Cystodytes guinensis Michaelsen, 1914
- Cystodytes inflatus Heiden, 1893
- Cystodytes lobatus (Ritter, 1900)
- Cystodytes luteus Monniot F., 1988
- Cystodytes morifer Michaelsen, 1919
- Cystodytes mucosus Monniot F., 1988
- Cystodytes multipapillatus Monniot F., 1988
- Cystodytes philippinensis Herdman, 1886
- Cystodytes planus Monniot F., 1974
- Cystodytes punctatus Monniot F., 1988
- Cystodytes ramosus Kott, 1992
- Cystodytes roseolus Hartmeyer, 1912
- Cystodytes rufus (Sluiter, 1909)
- Cystodytes semicataphractus (Sluiter, 1909)
- Cystodytes senegalense Monniot F., 1969
- Cystodytes solitus Monniot F., 1988
- Cystodytes variabilis (Sluiter, 1909)
- Cystodytes violatinctus Monniot F., 1988
