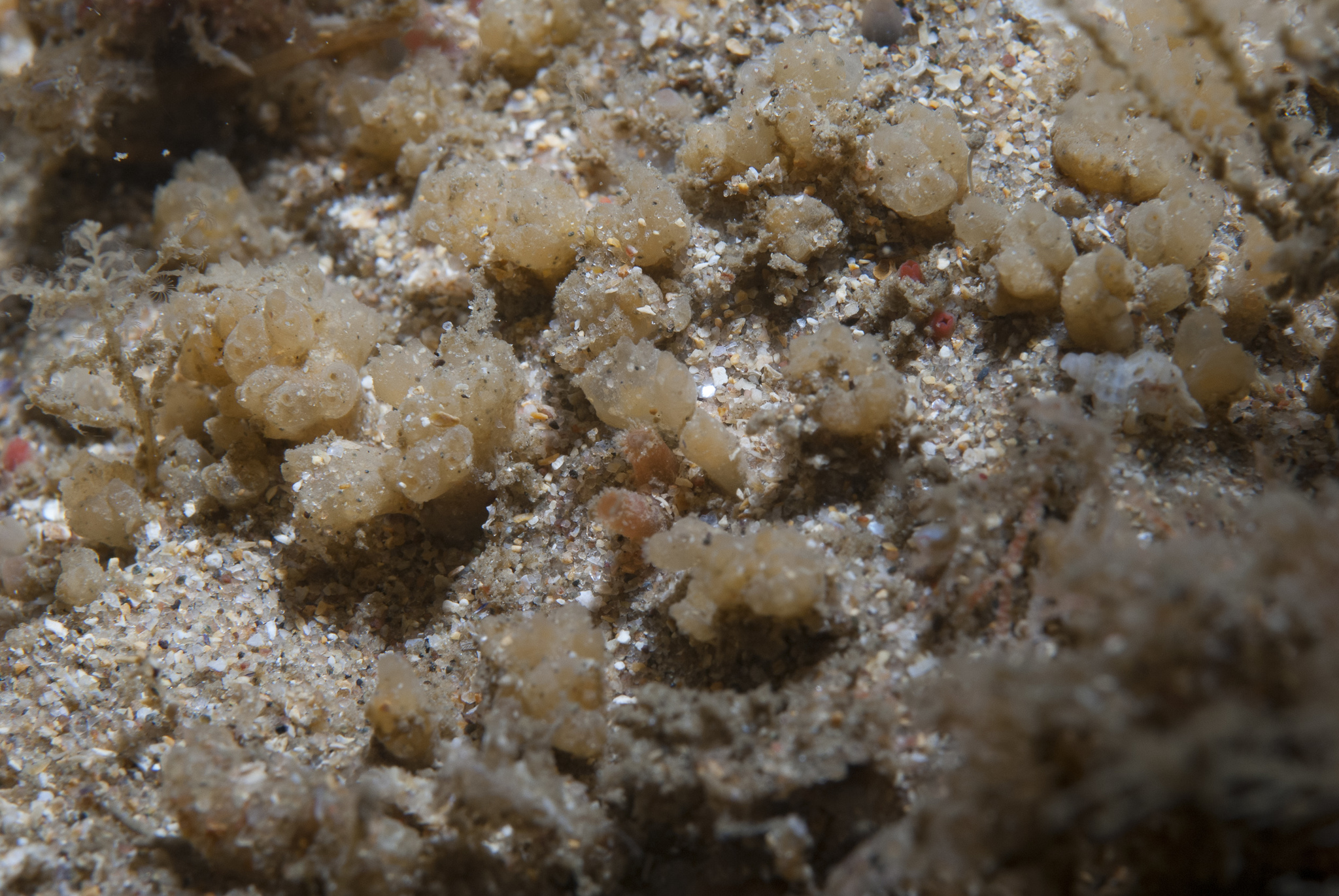
- Archidistoma aggregatum

Scientific classification
- Kingdom: Animalia
- Phylum: Chordata
- Subphylum: Tunicata
- Class: Ascidiacea
- Order: Aplousobranchia
- Family: Polycitoridae
- Genus: Archidistoma; Garstang, 1891

= Archidistoma =

Genus of sea squirts

Archidistoma is a genus of tunicates in the family Polycitoridae.

List of species:

- Archidistoma aggregatum
- Archidistoma dublum
