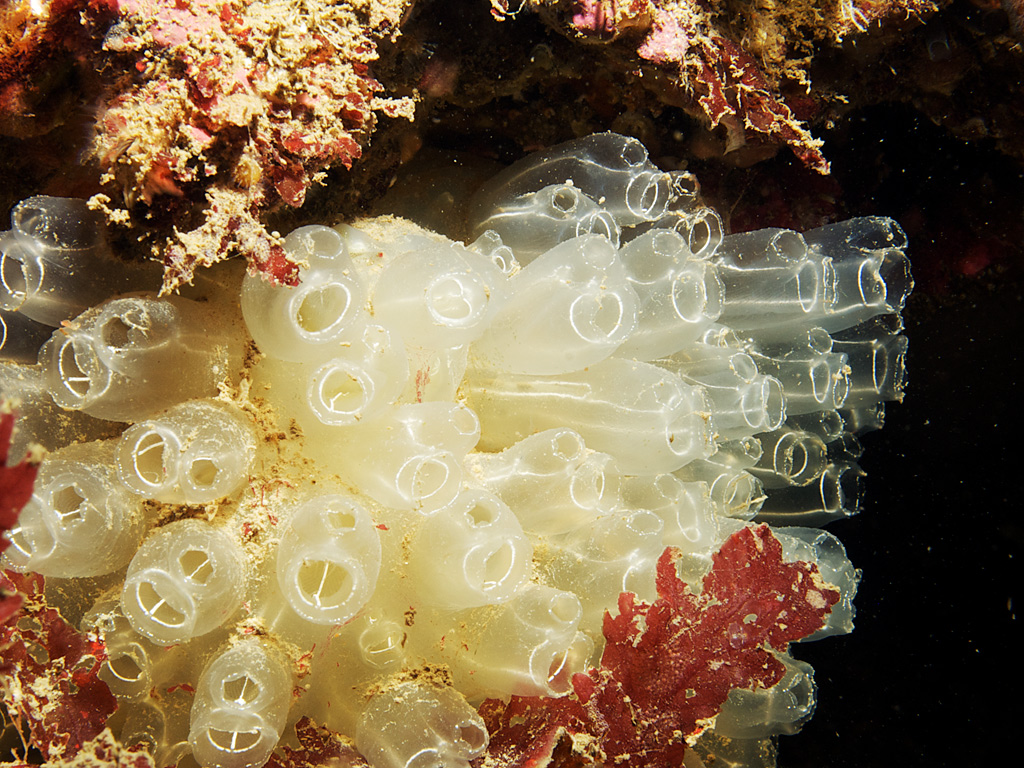
- The ascidian Diazona violacea, Firth of Lorne, Scotland, 20 m.

Scientific classification
- Kingdom: Animalia
- Phylum: Chordata
- Subphylum: Tunicata
- Class: Ascidiacea
- Order: Aplousobranchia
- Family: Diazonidae
- Genus: Diazona; Savigny, 1816

Type species
- Diazona violacea Savigny, 1816

Species
- 12 species (see text)

= Diazona =

Genus of sea squirts

Diazona is a genus of tunicates in the family Diazonidae.

== Species ==
The genus Diazona has 12 recognized species:

- Diazona angulata Monniot F. & Monniot C., 1996
- Diazona carnosa Monniot F. & Monniot C., 1996
- Diazona chinensis (Tokioka, 1955)
- Diazona formosa Monniot F. & Monniot C., 1996
- Diazona fungia Monniot F. & Monniot C., 2001
- Diazona geayi Caullery, 1914
- Diazona grandis (Oka, 1926)
- Diazona labyrinthea Monniot F. & Monniot C., 1996
- Diazona pedunculata Monniot F. & Monniot C., 2001
- Diazona tenera Monniot F. & Monniot C., 1996
- Diazona textura Monniot C., 1987
- Diazona violacea Savigny, 1816
