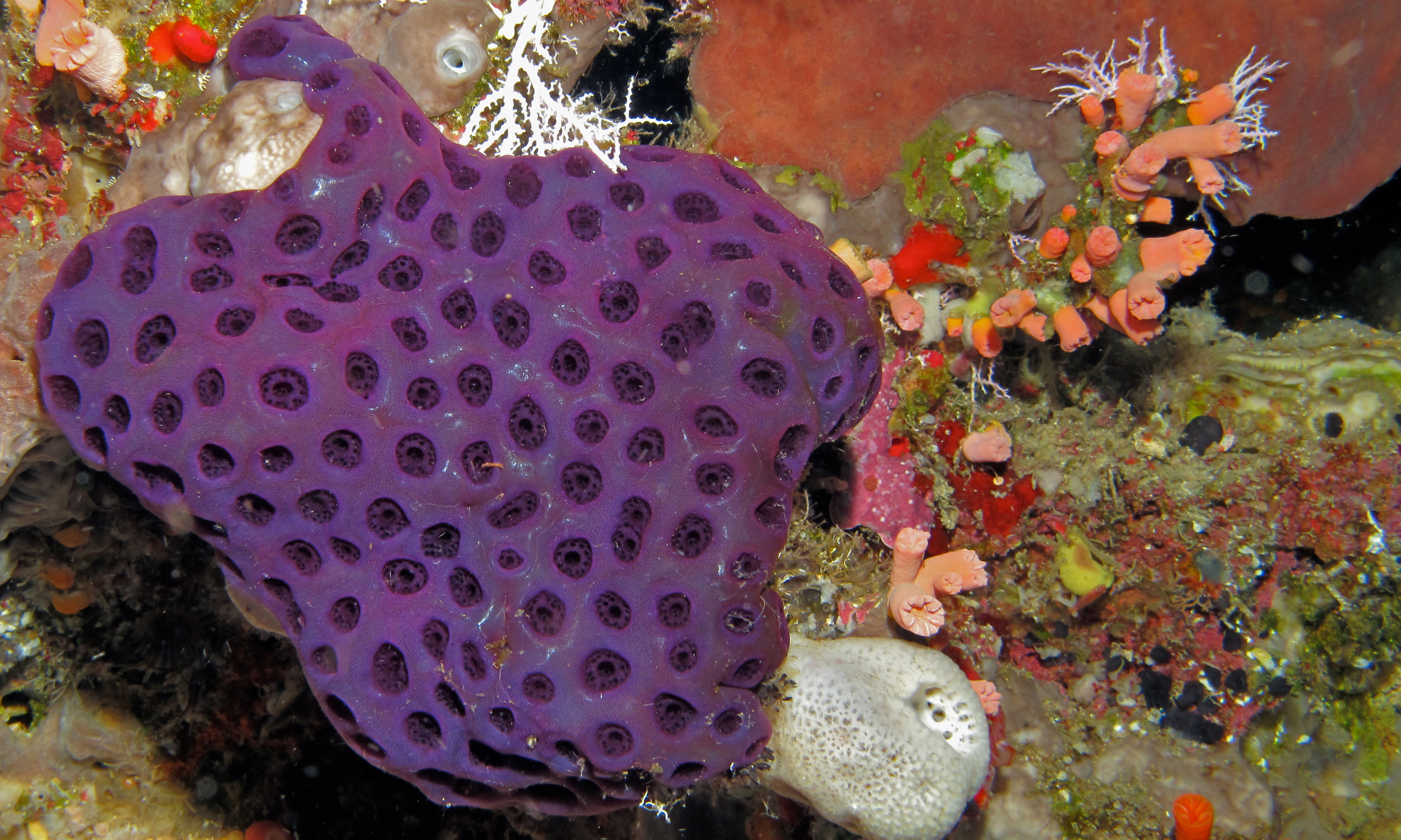
- Eudistoma reginum

Scientific classification
- Kingdom: Animalia
- Phylum: Chordata
- Subphylum: Tunicata
- Class: Ascidiacea
- Order: Aplousobranchia
- Family: Polycitoridae
- Genus: Eudistoma; Maurice Caullery, 1909

= Eudistoma =

Genus of sea squirts

Eudistoma is a genus of sea squirts belonging to the family Polycitoridae. It was first described in 1909 by Maurice Caullery. Originally it was thought to be a subgenus of Distoma. Eudistoma is the most species-rich genus in the family Polycitoridae, with 124 valid species as of 2014. They are found in tropical and temperate waters; some species are also found in the Antarctic and subtropical area.

== Description ==
In 1909 Caullery described Eudistoma as a subgenus of Distoma due to the rows of stigmata in the pharynx. In 1917 Ritter and Forsyth described it as a separate genus without explanation. Three subsequent papers published in 1919, 1921 and 1942 all considered it to be a subgenus of Polycitor. Eudistoma was finally considered a valid genus in 1945 due to "the three rows of pharyngeal slits, long esophagus, flat stomach in the posterior region of the abdomen, very conspicuous longitudinal muscles extending from the pharynx to the end of the abdomen and larvae that are incubated in the atrial cavity." Identification of species within the genus has been difficult at times due to the wide variety in shape and colour.

== Medical research ==
Biologically active alkaloids have been isolated from a number of species of Eudistoma, some of which have been studied for their cytotoxic properties. A number of these substances have been grouped under the name eudistomin, though they are not only found in Eudistoma species. They are being investigated for their possible use as antibiotics and anti-cancer agents.

Pibocin A (pibocin; 2-bromo-6,8β-dimethylergoline) and pibocin B (1-methoxy-2-bromo-6,8β-dimethylergoline) are ergoline alkaloids isolated from an ascidian (sea squirt) in the genus Eudistoma.

Pibocin A

Pibocin B
