= Synopiidae =

Scientific classification
- Kingdom: Animalia
- Phylum: Arthropoda
- Clade: Pancrustacea
- Class: Malacostraca
- Order: Amphipoda
- Superfamily: Synopioidea
- Family: Synopiidae

Synonyms
- Cardenioidae; Syrrhoidae; Tironidae

Family of crustaceans

Synopiidae is a family of amphipods belonging to the order Amphipoda.

== Genera ==
Genera:

- Austrosyrrhoe Barnard, 1925
- Bruzelia Boeck, 1871
- Bruzeliopsis Chevreux, 1911
