= Hervé Harant =

French physician parasitologist and zoologist

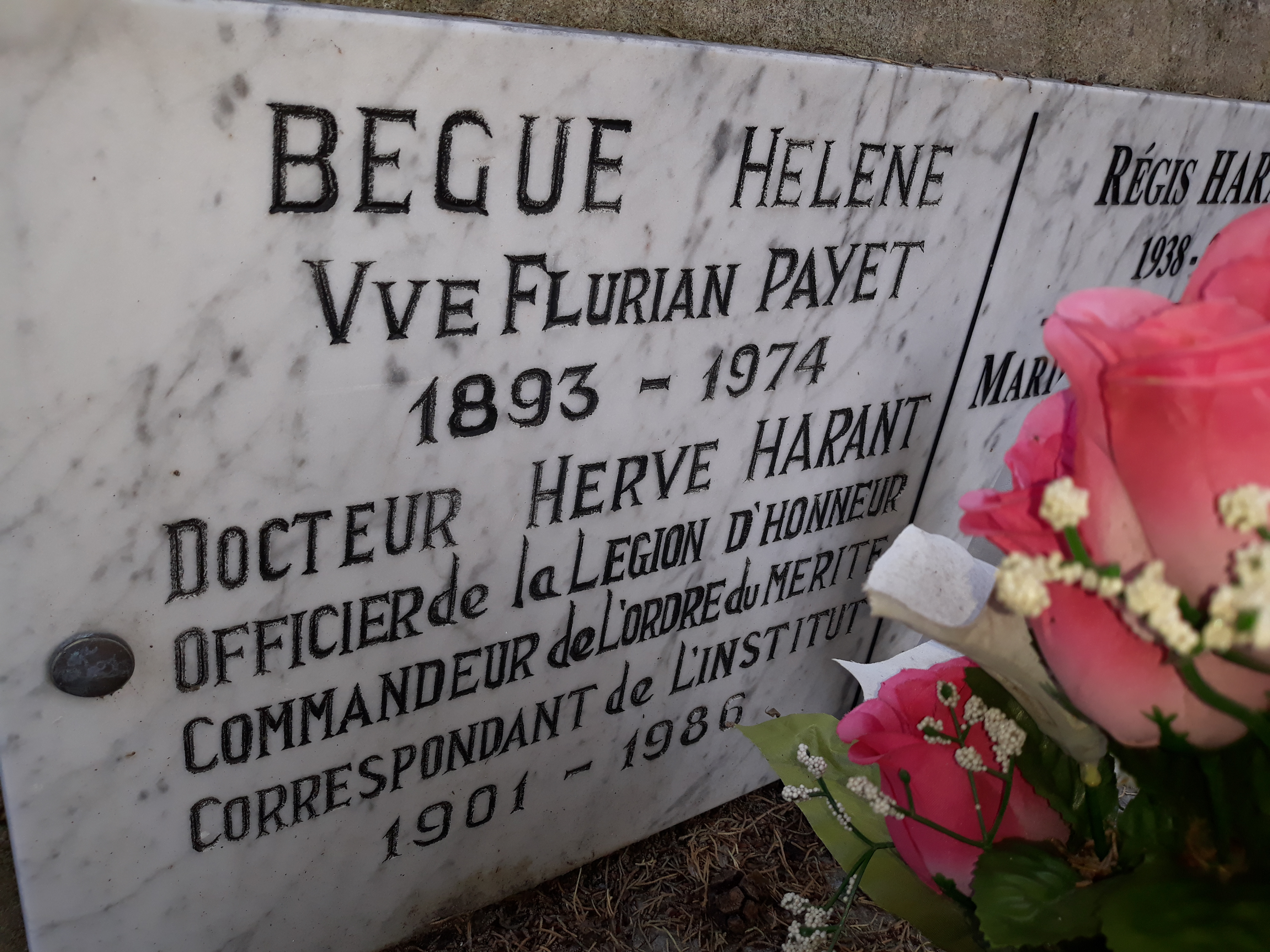
The tomb of Hervé Harant at Cimetière Vieux, Béziers.

Hervé Harant (born September 2, 1901 in Paulhan, Hérault–1986, Montpellier) was a French physician parasitologist and zoologist. He was professor of natural history, parasitology, and exotic pathology at the University of Montpellier medical school. From 1976 he was director of the Jardin des plantes de Montpellier.

== Works ==
partial list

- dissertation 1929 in Montpellier on hirudineans) (doctorat en médecine University of Montpellier)
- dissertation 1931 in Paris on ascidians and their parasites (doctorat ès sciences naturelles en Sorbonne)
- with Paulette Vernières - Faune de France Volume n° 27 (1901-1986) Tuniciers I, 1933
- with Paulette Vernières - Faune de France Volume n° 33 - Tuniciers II : Appendiculaires et Thaliacés, 1938, 60 p
- with Paulette Vernières - Tuniciers pélagiques provenant des croisières du prince Albert Ier de Monaco Monaco : Impr. de Monaco, 1934.
- With Daniel Jarry Guide du naturaliste dans le midi de la France Neuchâtel, Delachaux & Niestlé 1961-1963 : tome 1: La mer -Le littoral, tome 2: La garrigue, le maquis, les cultures
