= Polycitor =

Scientific classification
- Domain: Eukaryota
- Kingdom: Animalia
- Phylum: Chordata
- Subphylum: Tunicata
- Class: Ascidiacea
- Order: Aplousobranchia
- Family: Polycitoridae
- Genus: Polycitor; Renier, 1804

Genus of sea squirts

Polycitor is a genus of tunicates belonging to the family Polycitoridae.

The genus has almost cosmopolitan distribution.

== Species ==
Species:

- Polycitor adriaticus (Drasche, 1883)
- Polycitor africanus Monniot F. & Monniot C., 1997
- Polycitor annulus Kott, 1990
- Polycitor aurantiacus (Herdman, 1886)
- Polycitor calamus Kott, 1990
- Polycitor cerasus Kott, 1990
- Polycitor circes Michaelsen, 1930
- Polycitor clava (Harant & Vernieres, 1938)
- Polycitor columna Kott, 1954
- Polycitor crypticus Millar, 1970
- Polycitor crystallinus (Renier, 1804)
- Polycitor cuneatus Millar, 1964
- Polycitor emergens Kott, 1990
- Polycitor epicolon Monniot F. & Monniot C., 2006
- Polycitor giganteus (Herdman, 1899)
- Polycitor glareosus (Sluiter, 1906)
- Polycitor luderitzi Michaelsen, 1915
- Polycitor nitidus (Sluiter, 1898)
- Polycitor nubilus Kott, 1990
- Polycitor obeliscus Kott, 1972
- Polycitor porrecta (Millar, 1962)
- Polycitor profundus Monniot F., 1971
- Polycitor proliferus (Oka, 1933)
- Polycitor protectans (Herdman, 1899)
- Polycitor psammophorus Hartmeyer, 1912
- Polycitor searli Kott, 1952
- Polycitor spirifer Sluiter, 1909
- Polycitor subarborensis Kott, 1957
- Polycitor torensis Michaelsen, 1920
- Polycitor translucidus Kott, 1957
- Polycitor violaceus Sluiter, 1909
