= André Théry =

French entomologist

André Théry (1864–1947) was a French entomologist who specialised in Coleoptera especially Buprestidae. He founded in Algiers la Société d'Histoire naturelle de l'Afrique du Nord ( 1909) and in Morocco la Société des Sciences Naturelles (1920).

== Works ==
partial list

- Théry, A. 1926 Recherches synonymiques sur les Buprestides et descriptions d'espèces nouvelles. Bulletin et Annales de la Société Entomologique de Belgique 66: 149–182.
- Théry, A. 1930 Recherches synonymiques sur les Buprestides et notes diverses. I. Note sur le genre Galbella avec descriptiones d'espéces nouvelles; II. Observations concernant la preface du travail de M. Gebhardt; III. A propos de "Opuscula Buprestologica". Bulletin de la Société des Sciences Naturelles du Maroc 10: 21–53.
- Théry, A. 1934 Contributions a l'étude de la faune de Mozambique. Voyage de M. P. Lesne (1928–1929). 15e note, Coléoptères, Buprestides. Memórias e Estudos do Museu Zoológico de Universidade de Coimbra (1) No 77: 1–31.
- Faune de France Volume n° 41 - Coléoptères Buprestides. 1942, 221 p., 149 fig. (réimpression 1999)
- Théry, A. 1944 Monographie des Tetragonoschema (Coleop. Buprestidae, Anthaxini). Novitates Entomologicae 14 (4e suppl.): 1–25.
