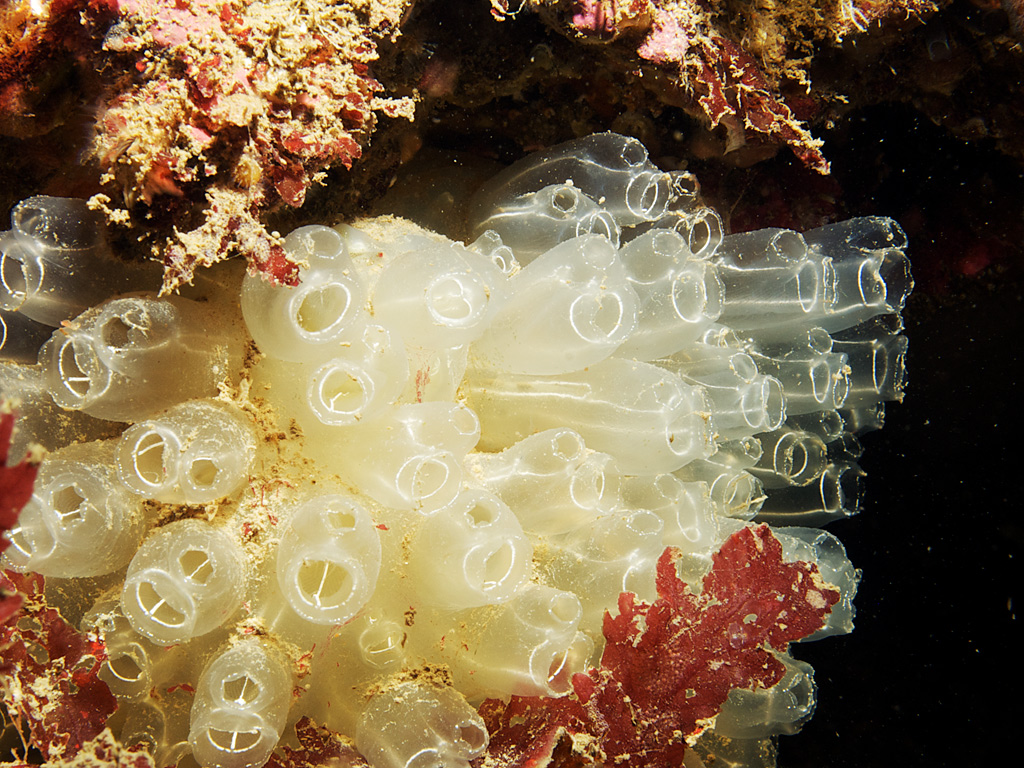
- Diazona violacea, Firth of Lorne, Scotland, 20 m

Scientific classification
- Domain: Eukaryota
- Kingdom: Animalia
- Phylum: Chordata
- Subphylum: Tunicata
- Class: Ascidiacea
- Order: Aplousobranchia
- Family: Diazonidae; Seeliger, 1906

Genera
- See text

= Diazonidae =

Family of sea squirts

Diazonidae is a family of sea squirts belonging to the order Aplousobranchia.

== Genera ==
Genera in the family Diazonidae include:

- Diazona Savigny, 1816
- Pseudodiazona Millar, 1963
- Pseudorhopalaea Millar, 1975
- Rhopalaea Philippi, 1843
- Tylobranchion Herdman, 1886
