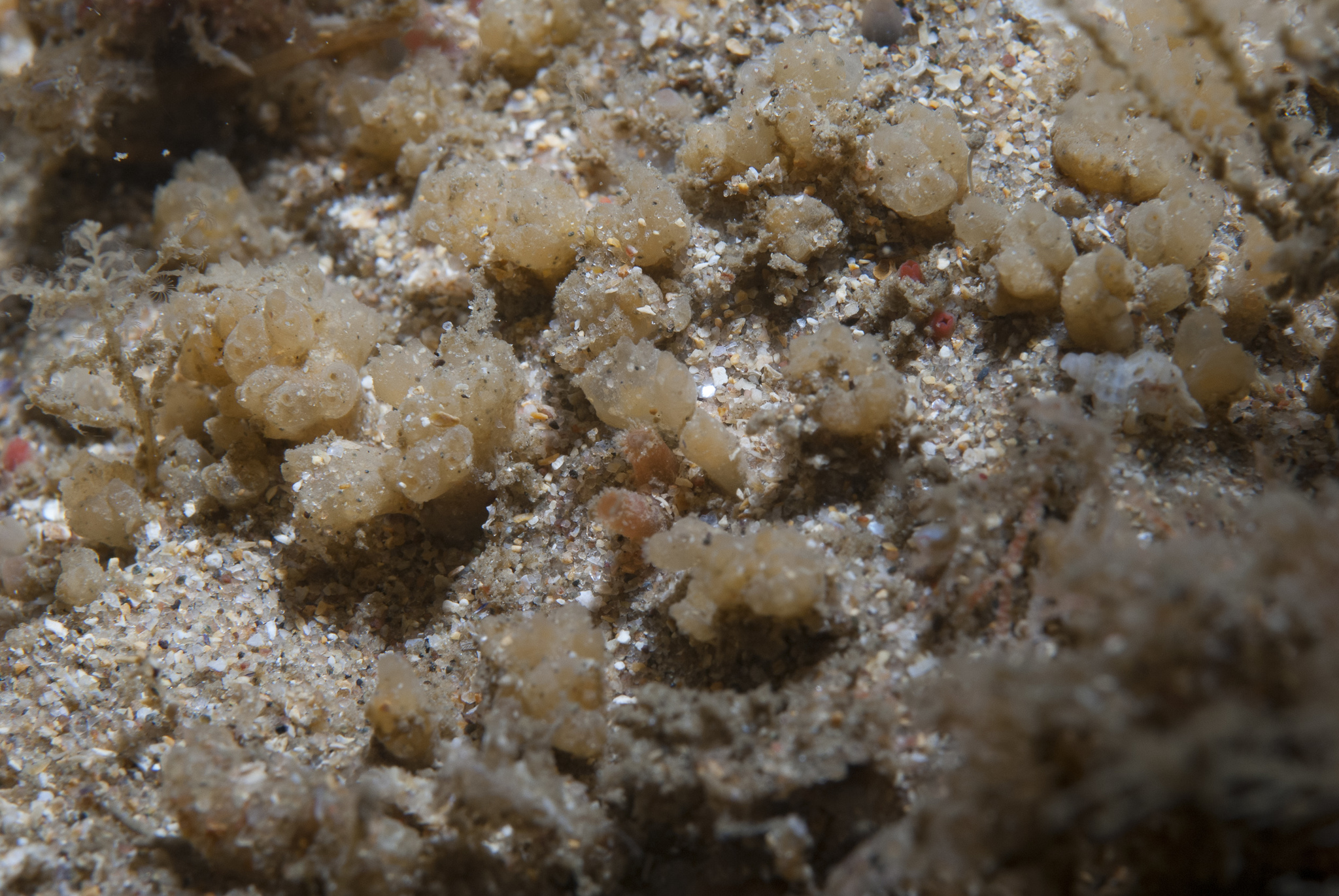
- Archidistoma aggregatum

Scientific classification
- Domain: Eukaryota
- Kingdom: Animalia
- Phylum: Chordata
- Subphylum: Tunicata
- Class: Ascidiacea
- Order: Aplousobranchia
- Family: Polycitoridae; Michaelsen, 1904

= Polycitoridae =

Family of sea squirts

Polycitoridae is a family of tunicates belonging to the order Aplousobranchia.

Genera:

- Archidistoma Garstang, 1891
- Brevicollus Kott, 1990
- Cystodytes Drasche, 1884
- Eucoelium Savigny, 1816
- Eudistoma Caullery, 1909
- Exostoma Kott, 1990
- Millarus Monniot & Monniot, 1988
- Polycitor Renier, 1804
- Polycitorella Michaelsen, 1924
- Rhombifera Pérès, 1956
- Salix Kott, 2005
