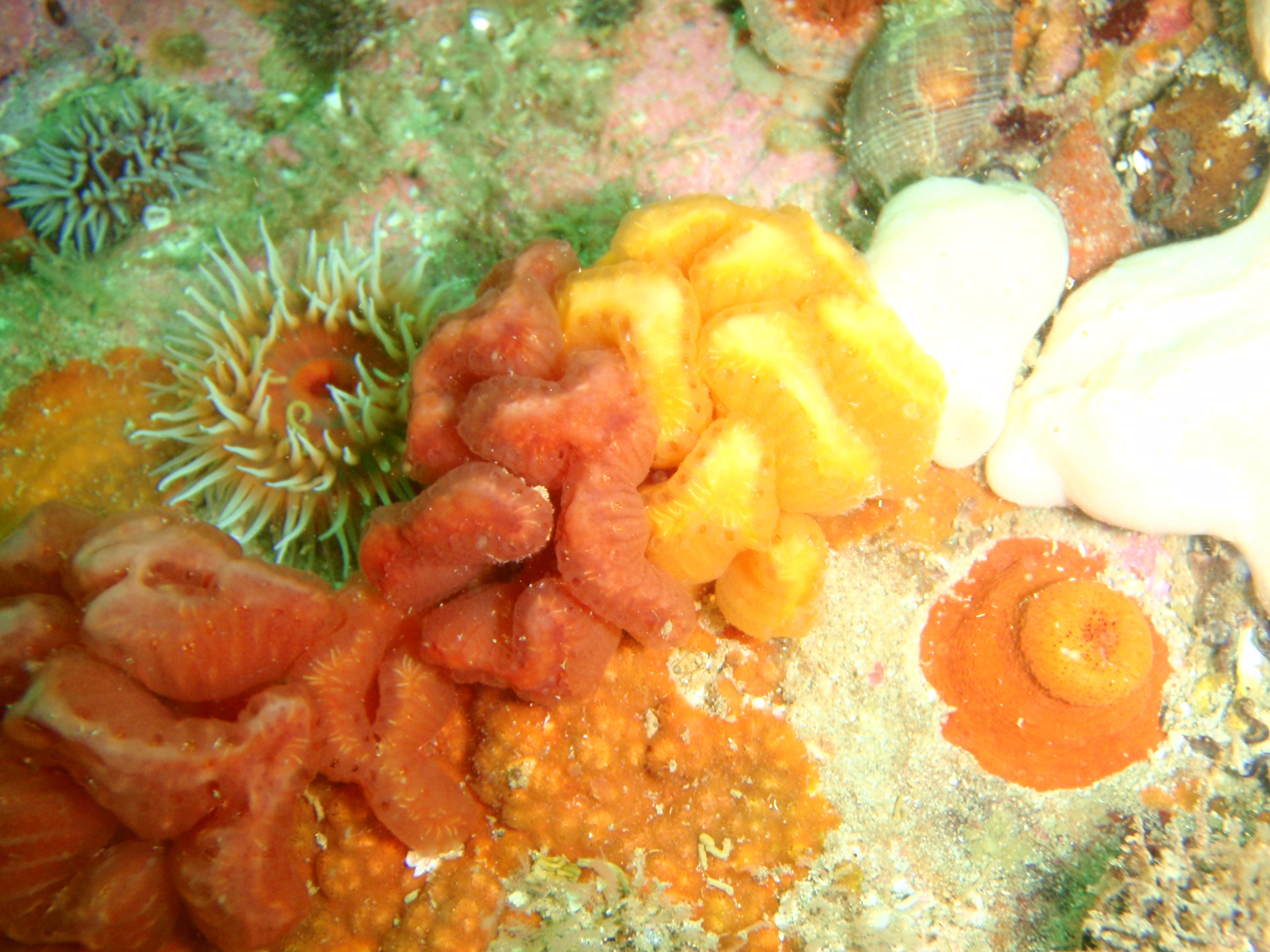
- Fan ascidians (Sycozoa arborescens)

Scientific classification
- Domain: Eukaryota
- Kingdom: Animalia
- Phylum: Chordata
- Subphylum: Tunicata
- Class: Ascidiacea
- Order: Aplousobranchia
- Family: Holozoidae; Berrill, 1950

Genera
- See text

= Holozoidae =

Family of sea squirts

Holozoidae is a family of sea squirts in the order Aplousobranchia.

== Genera ==
- Distaplia
- Hypodistoma
- Hypsistozoa
- Neodistoma
- Polydistoma
- Protoholozoa
- Pseudoplacentela
- Sigillina
- Sycozoa
