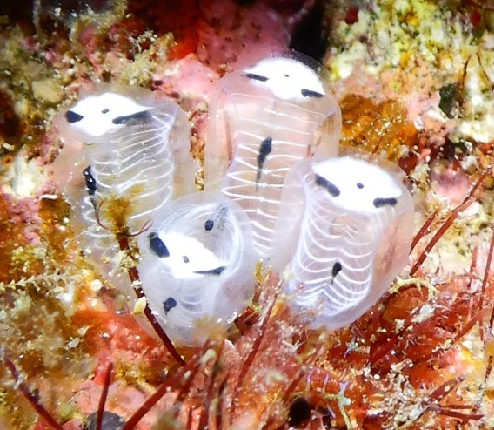
- Colony near Kume Island

Scientific classification
- Kingdom: Animalia
- Phylum: Chordata
- Subphylum: Tunicata
- Class: Ascidiacea
- Order: Aplousobranchia
- Family: Clavelinidae
- Genus: Clavelina
- Species: C. ossipandae

Binomial name
- Clavelina ossipandae Hasegawa & Kajihara, 2024

= Skeleton panda sea squirt =

Species of ascidian

Clavelina ossipandae, the skeleton panda sea squirt or skeleton panda ascidian (Japanese: ガイコツパンダホヤ, romanized: gaikotsu-panda-hoya), is a species of colonial ascidian (sea squirt), a group of sessile, marine filter-feeding invertebrates. Originally discovered near Kume Island in Japan by local divers, pictures of the animal attracted attention in the media for its appearance prior to its formal taxonomic description in 2024.

Among sea squirts, Clavelina ossipandae is most recognizable for its white horizontal blood vessels, giving it a skeleton-like appearance, and black frontal dots of unknown function, that have been compared to a panda's eyes and nose. After it was featured on television programs and social media, a crowdfunded expedition sampled specimens of the animal in 2021. The researchers formally described it three years later.

Clavelina ossipandae lives at around 20 metres (66 ft) of depth, anchored to the surface of coral reefs with strong currents. It lives in colonies of one to four transparent individuals or zooids measuring up to 2 centimetres (0.79 in) each. Individuals in a colony are linked through connections called stolons, and originate from a single organism reproducing asexually, although they are also capable of sexual reproduction.

== History ==
Although the skeleton panda sea squirt was not formally described at the time, pictures of it were shared by local divers from Kume Island in Japan's Ryukyu Archipelago around 2017, notably Shunji Terai, whose diving shop drew in tourists interested in seeing the creatures. Popular on social media such as Twitter, the animal was also featured in television programs, by NHK as well as commercial broadcasters.

The images attracted the attention of tunicate expert Naohiro Hasegawa from Hokkaido University, who encountered them on Twitter in 2018 and recognized the animal as distinct from other ascidian species. Supported through crowdfunding, a team of Japanese researchers led by Hasegawa sampled it in 2021 from the rocky outcrop of Tonbara, off Kume Island, which is only accessible in winter because of tidal currents and wind. In a 2024 paper announcing the discovery, the team formally described it as the new species Clavelina ossipandae. Researchers collected four colonies of one to four individuals each as specimens, which were later deposited in the Invertebrate Collection of the Hokkaido University Museum in Sapporo.

== Etymology ==
The common name of gaikotsu-panda-hoya (ガイコツパンダホヤ, translated as "skeleton panda sea squirt" or "skeleton panda ascidian") was given to the animal by Japanese internet users after the first pictures were shared online.

The generic name Clavelina, Latin for "little bottle", refers to the shape of zooids (individual members of the colony) in the genus. The specific epithet ossipandae is derived from Latin os (bone) and panda. Like the common name, it refers to the white rib-like markings on the sides of the zooid, as well as to the black and white patterns on its front part, resembling the face of the giant panda.

== Description ==
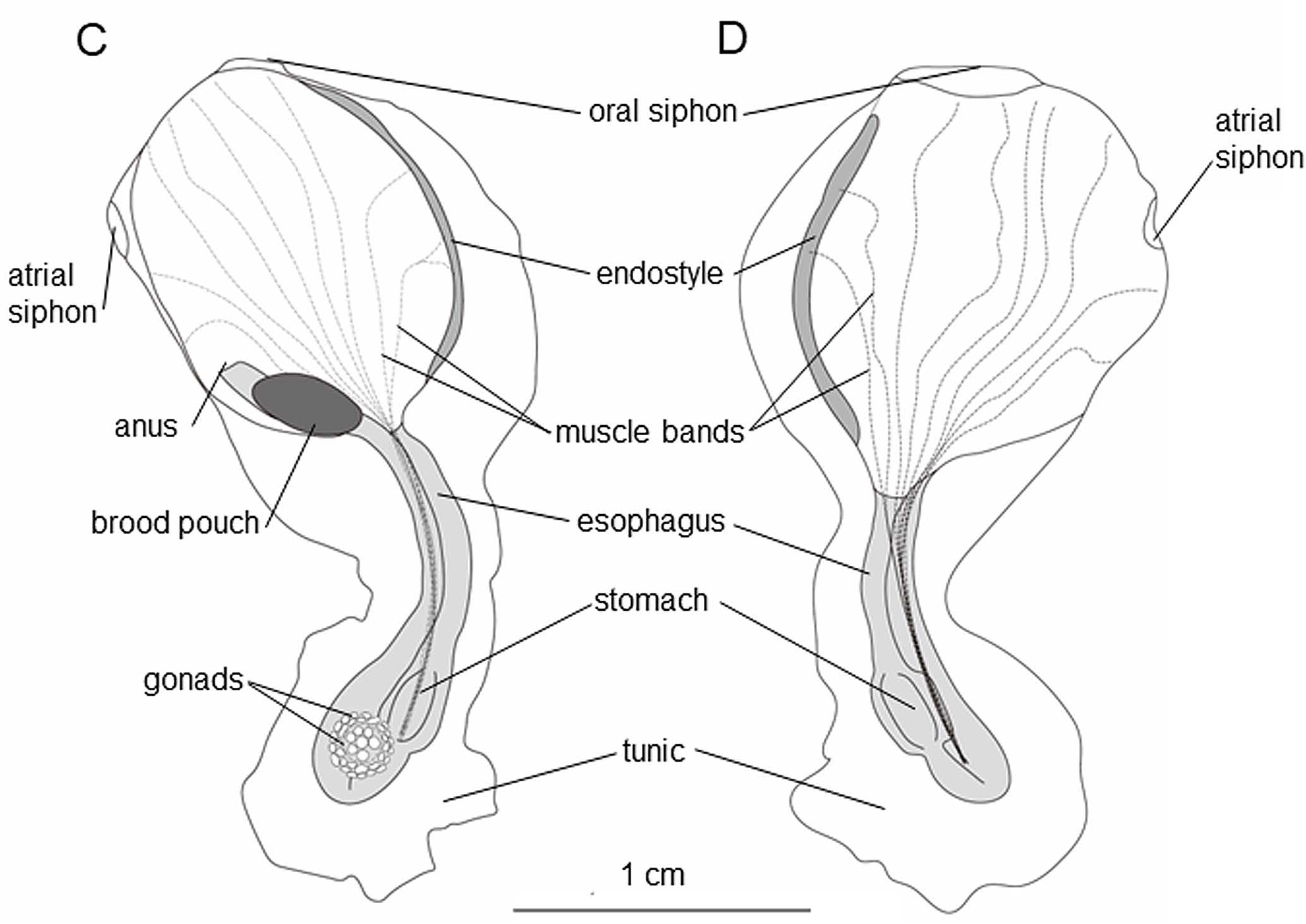
Clavelina ossipandae zooid (C: right side, D: left side)

Clavelina ossipandae is a small colonial tunicate, found in colonies of one to four zooids. Unlike in the related genera Euclavella and Nephtheis, zooids are free, meaning they do not share a common tunic, although they extend from a basal mass and are connected to each other through vascular stolons. Individual zooids have been reported to be up to 2 centimetres (0.79 in) long, with sampled specimens ranging from 7 to 14 millimetres (0.28 to 0.55 in) long.

=== Anatomy ===
Each zooid is covered in its own transparent tunic, which like in most sea squirts possesses two visible openings, the oral and atrial siphons. The oral siphon, through which food particles are drawn into the pharynx, is surrounded by 10 oral tentacles. The pharynx is the main cavity in which food is filtered, funneled through a dorsal tubercle with a ciliated slit-like opening. The back side of the pharynx is lined with a series of tongue-shaped dorsal languets that help transport food. An endostyle, another organ assisting in filter-feeding, is present on the front side below the oral siphon. The esophagus connects the pharynx to the stomach in the middle of the abdomen, followed by a tube-like intestinal loop. The latter leads to the anus, where waste is expelled through the atrial siphon.

The tunic is divided into thoracic and abdominal segments, almost equal in length, although the thoracic tunic is thinner and softer than its abdominal counterpart. The thorax bears 10–11 pairs of longitudinal muscle bands, with 2 running from the abdomen to the endostyle, 5–6 to the oral siphon and 2–4 to the dorsal side.

=== Patterns ===
Specimens bear several white transverse blood vessels along their length, giving the appearance of a series of ribs. The black endostyle is visible below the oral siphon, as well as a mid-dorsal black line below the atrial siphon.

Clavelina ossipandae is also recognizable by the black markings on its white anterior portion (a central dot between the oral and atrial siphons, surrounded by two lateral bands), uniquely distinctive in the genus Clavelina. Two other species in the genus are known to bear similar patterns, although they differ in color, being dark blue on light blue in C. moluccensis and blue on yellow in C. viola.

=== Life cycle ===
Clavelina ossipandae specimens are hermaphroditic: they possess both ovaries and testicular follicles, attached to the left side of the intestine beyond the stomach. A brood pouch is present on the back of the thorax, where eggs and larvae develop. Like in all tunicates, larvae are motile and tadpole-shaped. They measure around 1.25 millimetres (0.049 in) in length, of which the tail comprises 0.75 millimetres (0.030 in). The larval body is divided into a frontal plate, with three adhesive papillae, and a trunk bearing an ocellus and an otolith. Like other colonial sea squirts in its genus, Clavelina ossipandae can also reproduce asexually through budding.

== Taxonomy ==
Several morphological traits were used to identify Clavelina ossipandae as a member of genus Clavelina. Namely, the zooids are free rather than fully embedded, the larvae lack the tubular structures in their adhesive organs characteristic of the related genus Pycnoclavella, and the number of pharyngeal slit rows (10–14) is consistent with the range seen in Clavelina species (8–20).

Through sequencing of the cytochrome c oxidase subunit I gene from the holotype and a paratype, Clavelina ossipandae was identified as the sister species of C. australis inside the genus Clavelina.

- Clavelina + Nephtheis
  - - - - C. ossipandae
        - C. australis
      - C. breve
    - C. dellavallei
    - - C. moluccensis
      - C. oblonga
  - N. fascicularis
  - C. picta
  - - C. arafurensis
    - - C. gemmae
      - C. lepadiformis
      - C. sabbadini

== Distribution and ecology ==
The species is known to live in waters off the coast of Kume Island, Japan, where both the original reports and the later samples were obtained. Colonies were observed at depths of 10–20 metres (33–66 ft), anchored to coral reefs, and are believed to live specifically in areas with fast currents. It is the first species of ascidian known from Kume Island, although other specimens have been collected from the locality and are awaiting description as of 2024.
