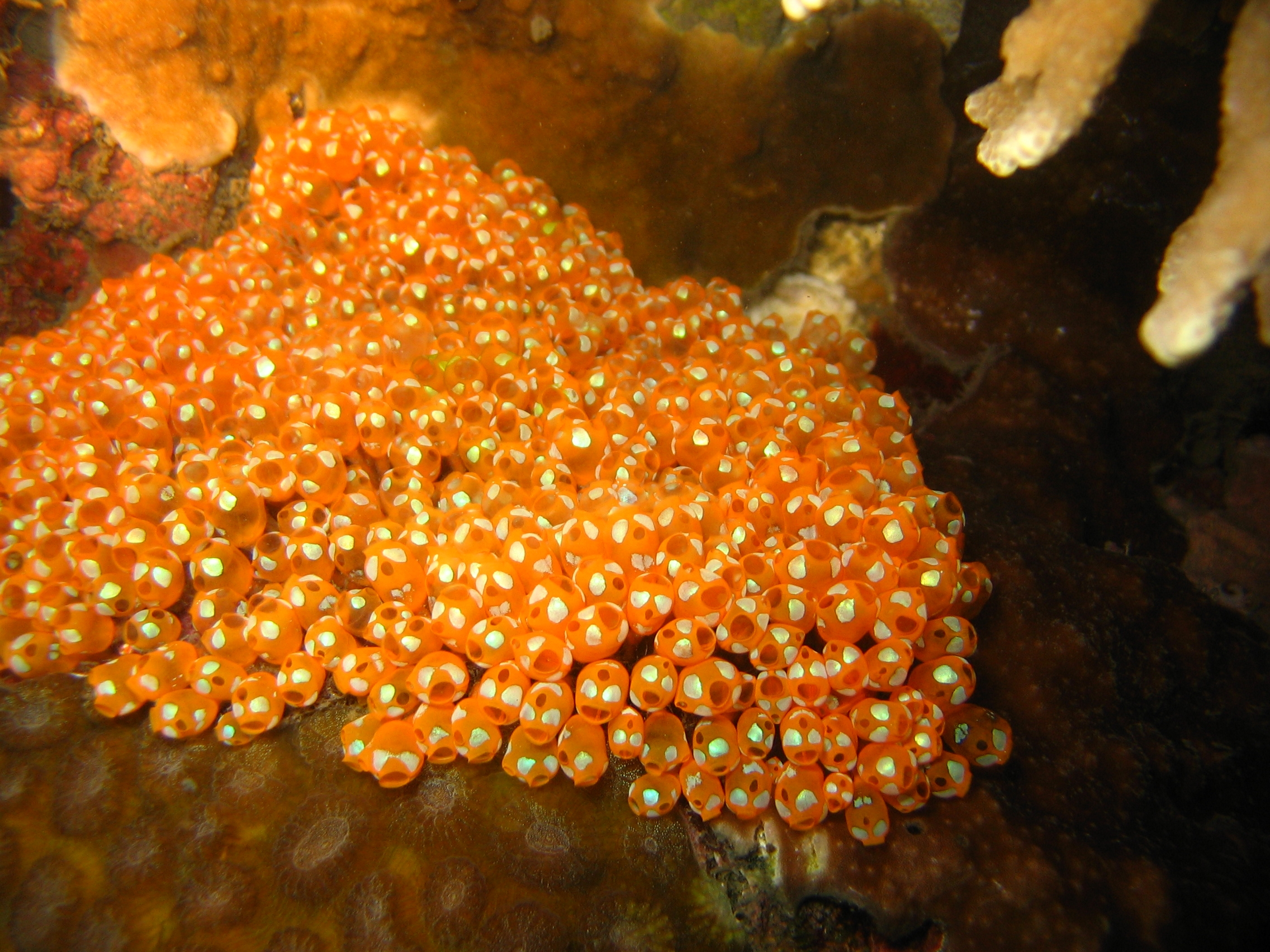
- Pycnoclavella diminuta in Occidental Mindoro, Philippines

Scientific classification
- Domain: Eukaryota
- Kingdom: Animalia
- Phylum: Chordata
- Subphylum: Tunicata
- Class: Ascidiacea
- Order: Aplousobranchia
- Family: Clavelinidae
- Genus: Pycnoclavella
- Species: P. diminuta

Binomial name
- Pycnoclavella diminuta (Kott, 1957)

Synonyms
- Archidistoma diminuta (Kott, 1957); Archidistoma diminutum (Kott, 1957); Archidistoma richeri Monniot, 1988; Archidistoma rubripunctum Monniot, 1988; Clavelina diminuta Kott, 1957; Clavelina nodula Kott, 1972

= Pycnoclavella diminuta =

Species of sea squirt

Pycnoclavella diminuta, known as the white-spotted sea squirt, white-spot ascidian, and white-spotted ascidian, is a species of tunicate (sea squirt), in the genus Pycnoclavella. Like all ascidians, these sessile animals are filter feeders.

== Description ==
Pycnoclavela diminuta lives in colonies composed of small clusters of zooids that originate from a common stalk. Each zooid is approximately 0.5–1 cm (0.20–0.39 in) in length. They are golden yellow-orange in colour and have white spots. The spots vary in shape and size, but are well defined, and are consistent throughout the colony.

This species can be confused with Pycnoclavella flava (formerly Clavina flava), which may also have white spots. But Pycnoclavela diminuta can be differentiated in that the spots are always clearly defined and always constant.

== Distribution ==
This species occurs in numerous locations, including:

- Western Pacific Ocean
- Indo-West Pacific
- Australia
- Lord Howe Island
- New Caledonia
- Indonesia
- Philippines

== Behaviour ==
Pycnoclavella diminuta is a sessile suspension feeder.

== Habitat ==
This ascidian lives in depths from 5 to 20 metres in the benthic zone in caves and under ledges. It often occurs in environments with soft corals such as Dendronephthya and Scleronephthya.
