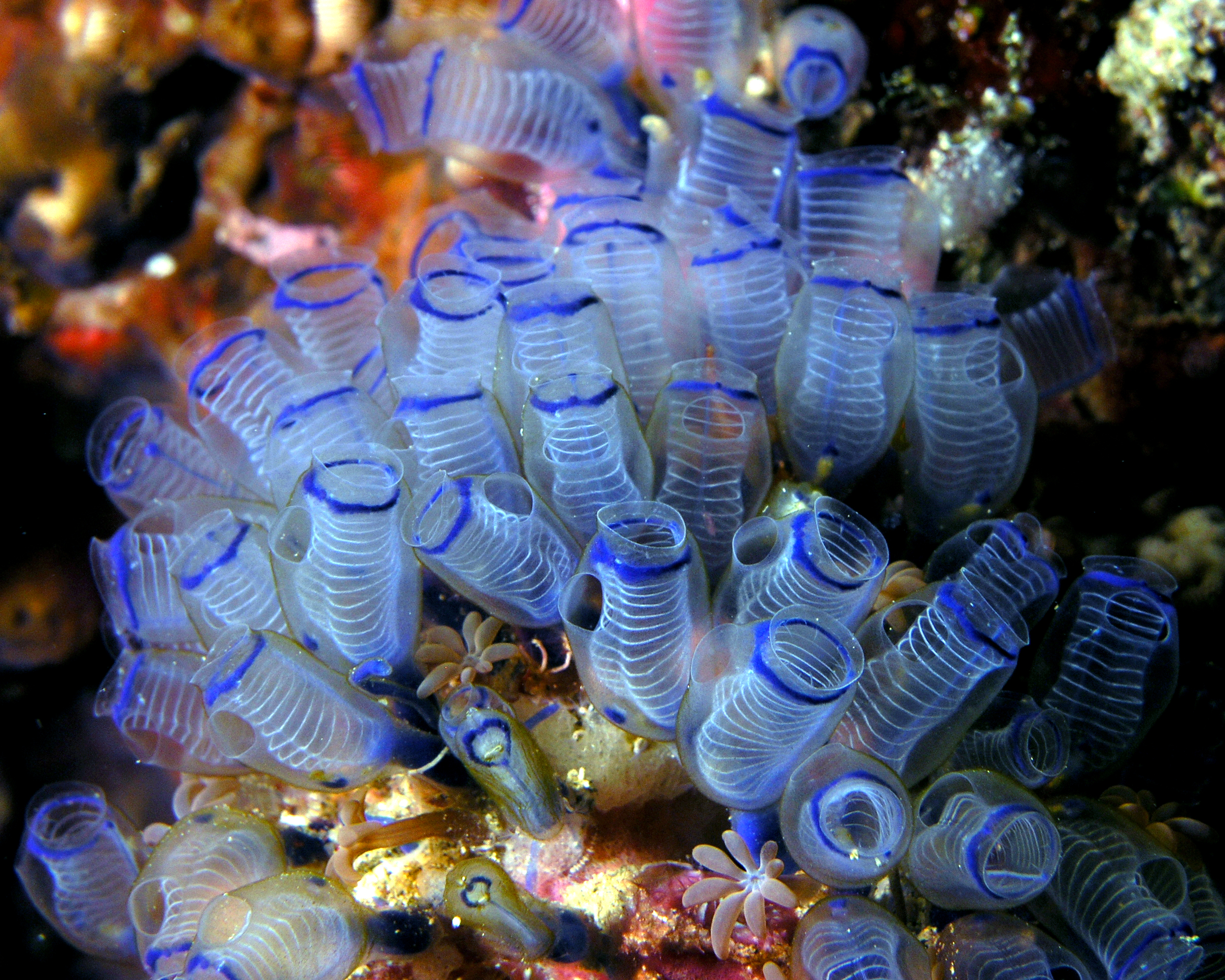

Scientific classification
- Domain: Eukaryota
- Kingdom: Animalia
- Phylum: Chordata
- Subphylum: Tunicata
- Class: Ascidiacea
- Order: Aplousobranchia
- Family: Clavelinidae
- Genus: Clavelina
- Species: C. coerulea

Binomial name
- Clavelina coerulea Oka, 1934

= Clavelina coerulea =

Species of sea squirt

Clavelina coerulea, the blue ringed sea squirt, is a species of tunicates belonging to the family Clavelinidae. The species name refers to the vivid blue body coloration. Members of the class Ascidiacea including this species are hermaphroditic; both cross- and self-fertilization is typical. The eggs of this tunicate develop into lecithotrophic larva before metamorphosing into sessile benthic adults. When disturbed, these tunicates may draw up their apertures, much like a drawstring around the rim of a bag. They are filter feeders, drawing plankton in through their incurrent aperture in a continuous stream of water, using tiny hair-like cilia, and expelling waste through the excurrent aperture.
