= Clavelina simplex =

Scientific classification
- Domain: Eukaryota
- Kingdom: Animalia
- Phylum: Chordata
- Subphylum: Tunicata
- Class: Ascidiacea
- Order: Aplousobranchia
- Family: Clavelinidae
- Genus: Clavelina
- Species: C. simplex

Binomial name
- Clavelina simplex Kott, 2006

Species of sea squirt

Clavelina simplex is a sea squirt in the family Clavelinidae and was first described in 2006 by Patricia Kott, from a specimen (QM G308824) collected at a depth of 169 metres in a Tasmanian canyon in Banks Strait.
