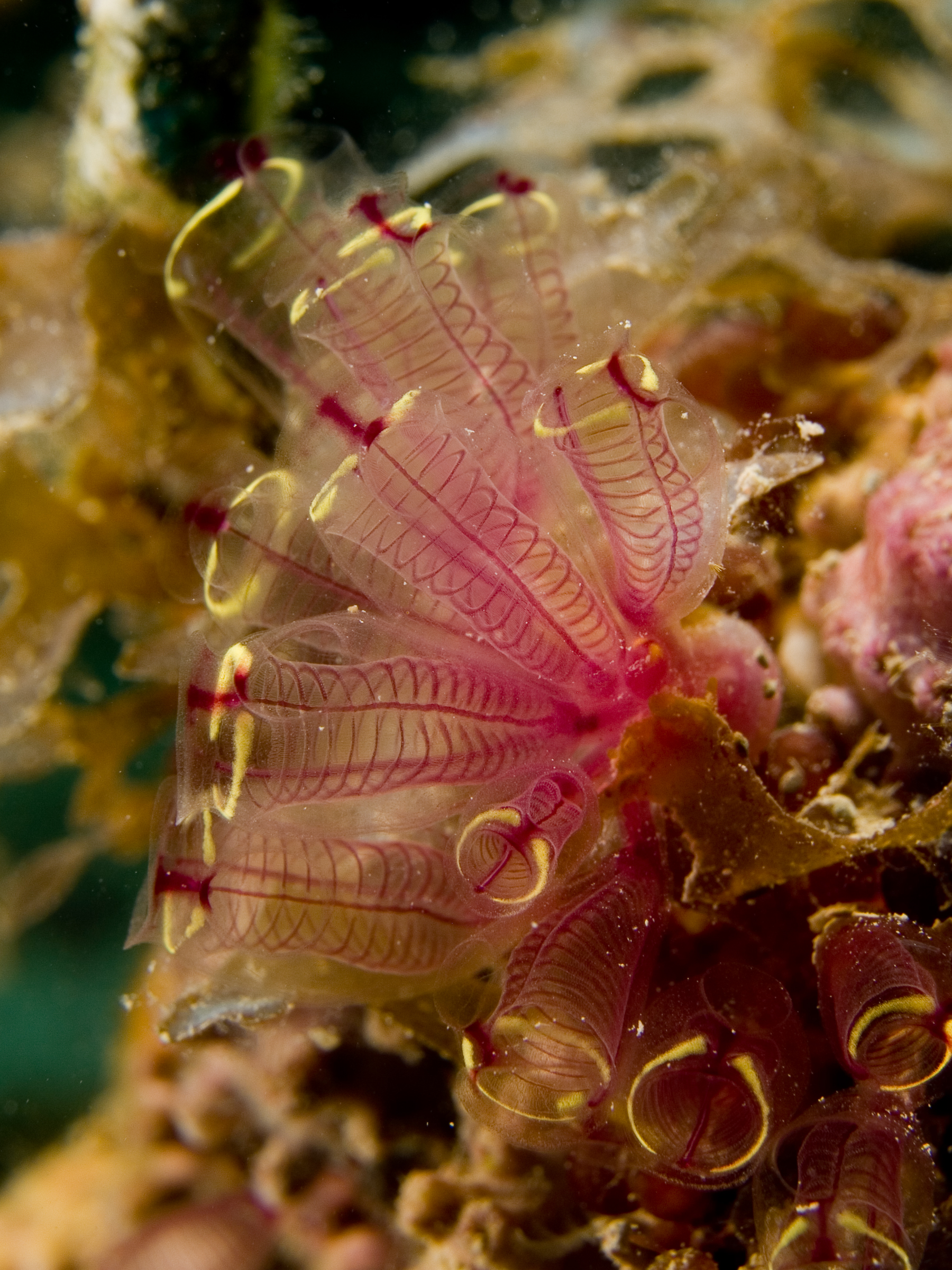
- Clavelina picta

Scientific classification
- Kingdom: Animalia
- Phylum: Chordata
- Subphylum: Tunicata
- Class: Ascidiacea
- Order: Aplousobranchia
- Family: Clavelinidae
- Genus: Clavelina; Savigny, 1816

= Clavelina =

Genus of sea squirts

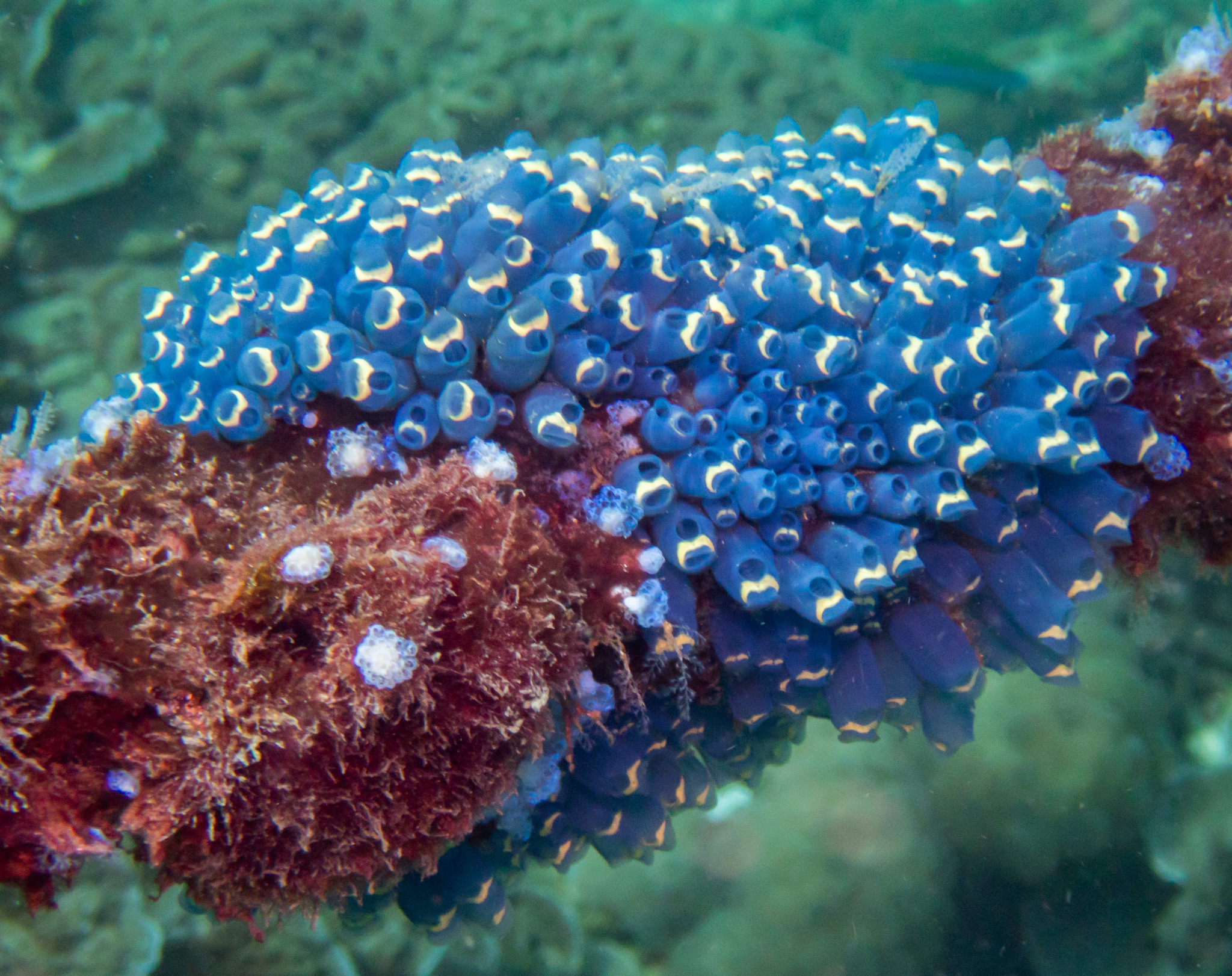
C. cyclus

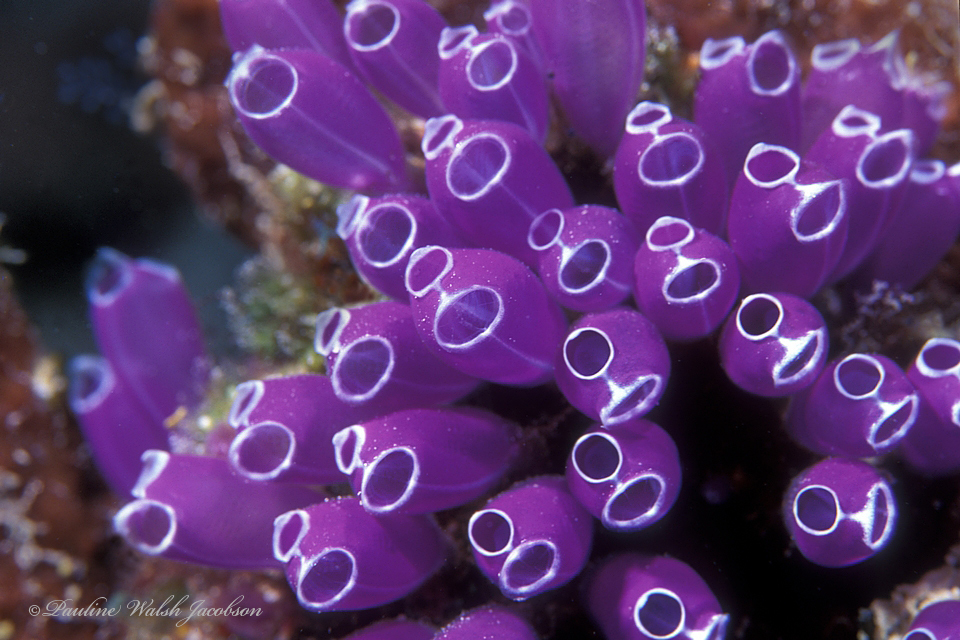
Bluebell tunicate (C. puertosecensis)

Clavelina ("little bottle") is genus of sea squirts (Ascidiacea).

== Species ==
The genus contains the following species:

- Clavelina amplexa Kott, 2002
- Clavelina arafurensis Tokioka, 1952
- Clavelina auracea Monniot, 1997
- Clavelina australis (Herdman, 1899)
- Clavelina baudinensis Kott, 1957
- Clavelina borealis Savigny, 1816
- Clavelina brasiliensis (Millar, 1977)
- Clavelina breve Monniot, 1997
- Clavelina coerulea Oka, 1934
- Clavelina concrescens Hartmeyer, 1924
- Clavelina cyclus Tokioka & Nishikawa, 1975
- Clavelina cylindrica (Quoy & Gaimard, 1834)
- Clavelina dagysa (Kott, 1957)
- Clavelina dellavallei (Zirpolo, 1825)
- Clavelina detorta (Sluiter, 1904)
- Clavelina elegans (Oka, 1927)
- Clavelina enormis Herdman, 1880
- Clavelina fasciculata Van Name, 1945
- Clavelina fecunda (Sluiter, 1904)
- Clavelina gemmae Turon, 2005
- Clavelina huntsmani Van Name, 1931
- Clavelina kottae (Millar, 1960)
- Clavelina lepadiformis (Müller, 1776)
- Clavelina maculata Monniot & Monniot, 2001
- Clavelina meridionalis (Herdman, 1891)
- Clavelina michaelseni Millar, 1982
- Clavelina miniata Watanabe & Tokioka, 1973
- Clavelina minuta Tokioka, 1962
- Clavelina mirabilis Kott, 1972
- Clavelina moluccensis (Sluiter, 1904)
- Clavelina neapolitana Della Valle, 1881
- Clavelina nigra Kott, 1990
- Clavelina obesa Nishikawa & Tokioka, 1976
- Clavelina oblonga Herdman, 1880
- Clavelina oliva Kott, 1990
- Clavelina ossipandae Hasegawa & Kahijira, 2024
- Clavelina ostrearium (Michaelsen, 1930)
- Clavelina phlegraea Salfi, 1929
- Clavelina picta (Verrill, 1900)
- Clavelina polycitorella (Tokioka, 1954)
- Clavelina pseudobaudinensis (Kott, 1976)
- Clavelina puertosecensis Millar & Goodbody, 1974
- Clavelina robusta Kott, 1990
- Clavelina roseola Millar, 1955
- Clavelina sabbadini Brunetti, 1987
- Clavelina simplex Kott, 2006
- Clavelina steenbrasensis Millar, 1955
- Clavelina viola Tokioka & Nishikawa, 1976

== Phylogeny ==
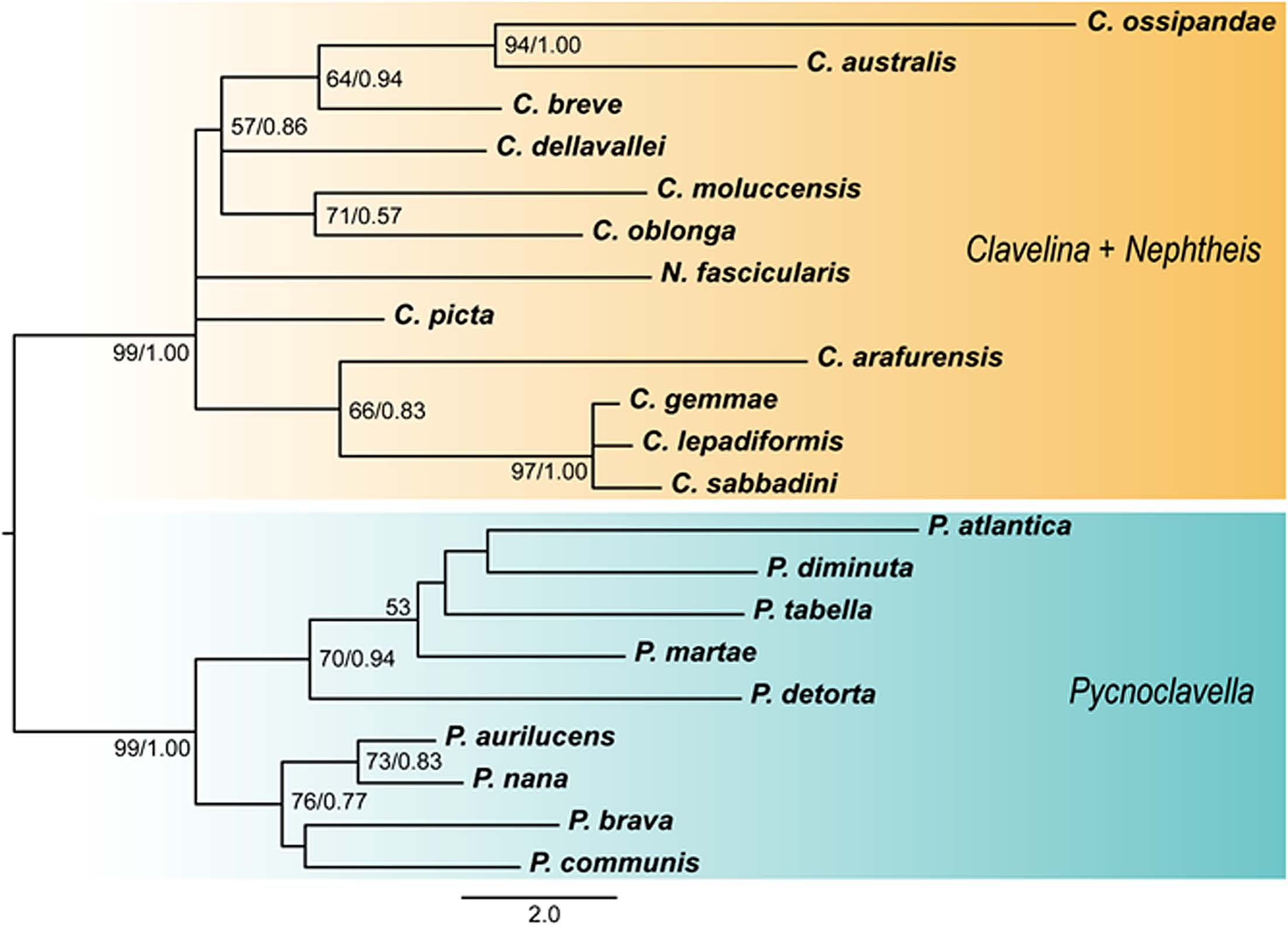
Cladogram of Clavelina and related genera.

A 2024 study of cytochrome c oxidase subunit I gene sequences found that Clavelina was paraphyletic to the genus Nephtheis.
