= Pycnoclavella arenosa =

Scientific classification
- Domain: Eukaryota
- Kingdom: Animalia
- Phylum: Chordata
- Subphylum: Tunicata
- Class: Ascidiacea
- Order: Aplousobranchia
- Family: Clavelinidae
- Genus: Pycnoclavella
- Species: P. arenosa

Binomial name
- Pycnoclavella arenosa (Kott, 1972)

Species of sea squirt

Pynoclavella arenosa is a species of tunicate in the family Clavelinidae. The scientific name of the species, Oxycorynia arenosa, was first validly published by Patricia Kott in 1972.

== Habitat ==
This tunicate can be found in waters of Southern Australia.
