= Clavelina minuta =

Scientific classification
- Domain: Eukaryota
- Kingdom: Animalia
- Phylum: Chordata
- Subphylum: Tunicata
- Class: Ascidiacea
- Order: Aplousobranchia
- Family: Clavelinidae
- Genus: Clavelina
- Species: C. minuta

Binomial name
- Clavelina minuta Tokioka, 1962

Species of Ascidiacea

Clavelina minuta is a species of sea squirt found in Japan, that has been demonstrated to produce an intrinsic (non-secreted) green bioluminescence of 535 nm. Notably, this bioluminescence is not thought to be due to bacterial symbionts. Clavelina minuta is currently the only sea squirt (Ascidiacea) known to produce light, however old reports also report luminescence in Botryllus and Ciona. Amongst other tunicates, the unrelated Pyrosoma and Appendicularia (e.g. genus Oikopleura), which produce an intrinsic blue light, are bioluminescent, and genera Doliolum (Doliolidae) and Cyclosalpa (Salpidae) may also be bioluminescent.
