= Clavelina elegans =

Scientific classification
- Kingdom: Animalia
- Phylum: Chordata
- Subphylum: Tunicata
- Class: Ascidiacea
- Order: Aplousobranchia
- Family: Clavelinidae
- Genus: Clavelina
- Species: C. elegans

Binomial name
- Clavelina elegans (Oka, 1927)

Synonyms
- Dendroclavella elegans Oka, 1927

Species of sea squirt

Clavelina elegans is a tunicate species in the genus Clavelina. It is found in Japan.
