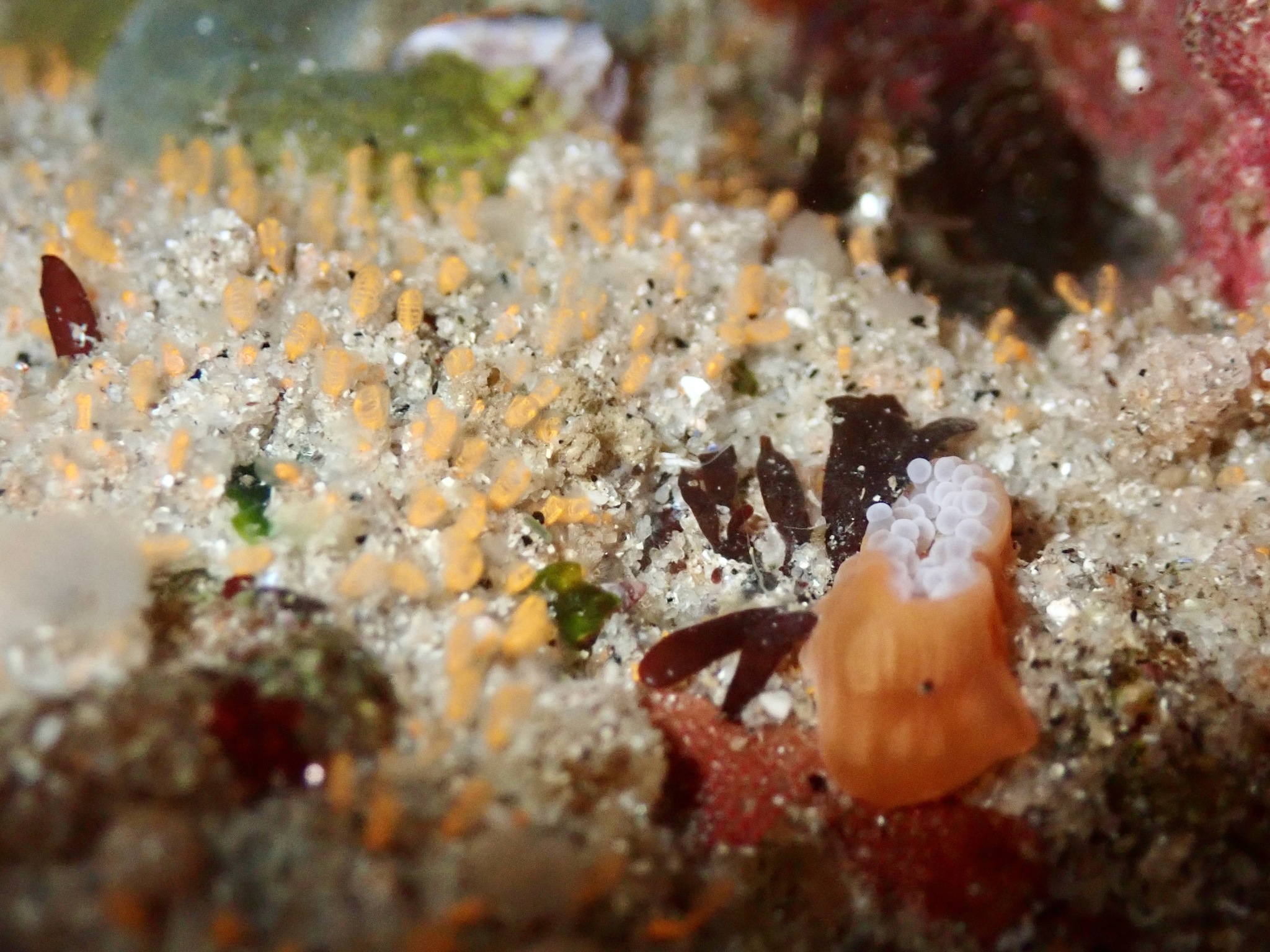

Scientific classification
- Kingdom: Animalia
- Phylum: Chordata
- Subphylum: Tunicata
- Class: Ascidiacea
- Order: Aplousobranchia
- Family: Clavelinidae
- Genus: Pycnoclavella
- Species: P. stanleyi

Binomial name
- Pycnoclavella stanleyi Berrill & Abbott, 1949

= Pycnoclavella stanleyi =

Species of sea squirt

Pycnoclavella stanleyi is a species of sea squirt that was initially described from specimens collected in the vicinity of Pacific Grove, California, including at Asilomar State Beach.

== Description ==
Pycnoclavella stanleyi is a colonial ascidian with widely separated individuals sharing a base, a leathery tunic typically covered in sand grains. P. stanleyi can be recognized by its seven rows of gill slits and striking gold or yellow-orange pharynx coloration. This coloration overlaps with the introduced Botrylloides violaceus, but that species is chained without clear outer separation of individuals. Overall, this is a small species with individuals not exceeding 1 cm in height.

== Reproduction ==
Like other ascidians, P. stanleyi can reproduce both sexually and asexually. Asexual reproduction takes place via budding. Sexual reproduction results in the formation of larvae, which resemble tadpoles, with an oval body with a long tail. Within the body, there is a dark spot, which is the ocellus, a type of simple eye. Unlike many other sea squirt larvae, they lack an otolith.

== Range ==
Pycnoclavella stanleyi inhabits the Eastern Pacific shoreline, from British Columbia to Baja California.

== Habitat ==
This tunicate prefers shallow water; it is found encrusting surf-pounded rocks near sandy bottoms from a depth of 0 to 10 m. It often occurs near seaweed holdfasts.

== Ecology ==
Like other sea squirts, P. stanleyi is a sessile filter feeder; it pulls food particles from fast-moving water using its pharynx with gill slits. P. stanleyi is one of the vanadium-sequestering tunicate species, with circulating vanadocytes in the bloodstream.

== Etymology ==
Pycnoclavella stanleyi is named after John Stanley, a colleague of N. J. Berrill, who initially described this species with D. P. Abbott.
