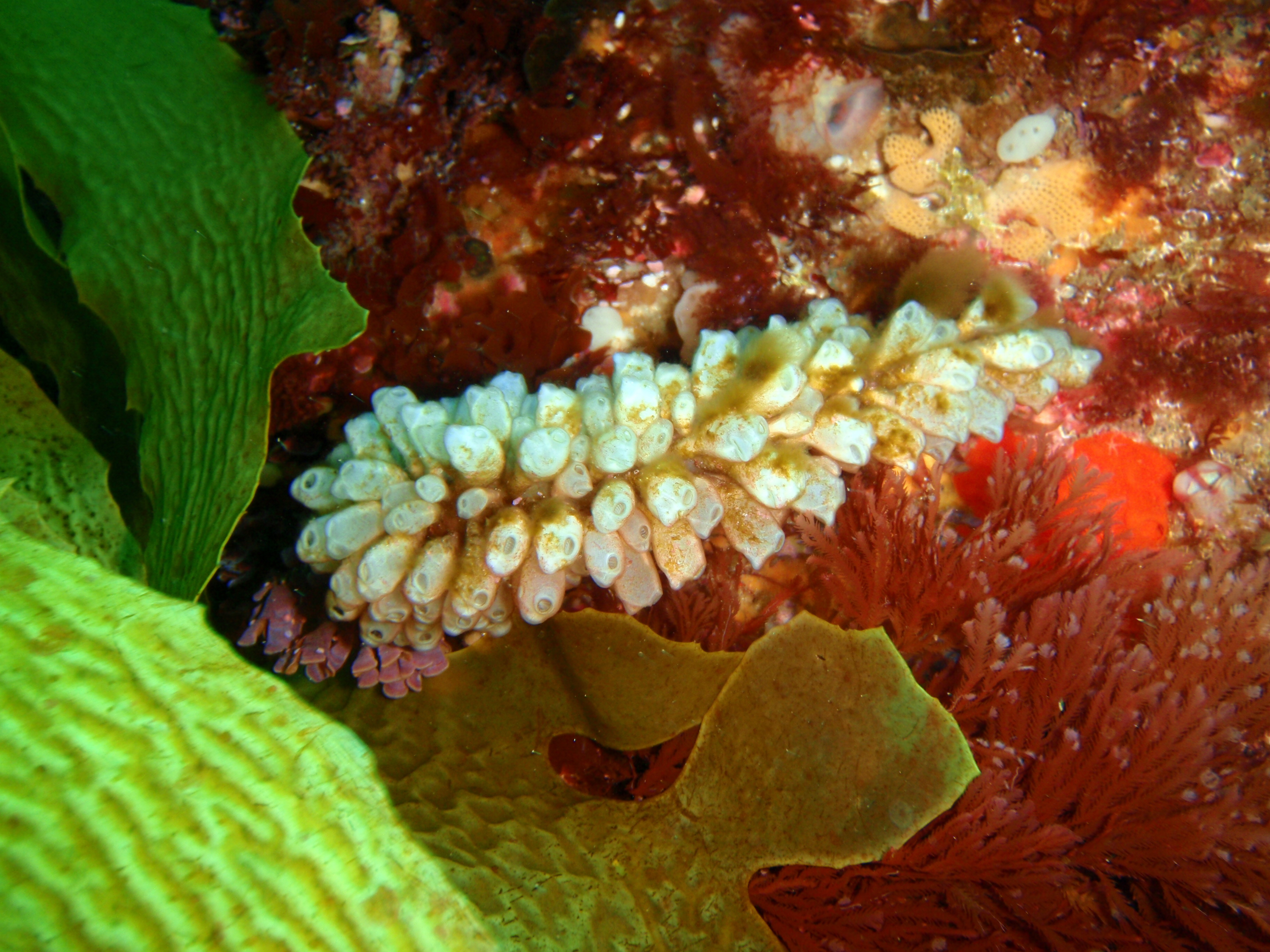

Scientific classification
- Domain: Eukaryota
- Kingdom: Animalia
- Phylum: Chordata
- Subphylum: Tunicata
- Class: Ascidiacea
- Order: Aplousobranchia
- Family: Clavelinidae
- Genus: Clavelina
- Species: C. cylindrica

Binomial name
- Clavelina cylindrica (Quoy & Gaimard, 1834)

Synonyms
- Chondrostachys cylindrica (Quoy & Gaimard, 1834); Chondrostachys cylyndrica (Quoy & Gaimard, 1834); Chondrostachys macdonaldi Bronn, 1862; Podoclavella cylindrica (Quoy & Gaimard, 1834); Polyclinum cylindrica Quoy & Gaimard, 1834; Polyclinum cylindricum Quoy & Gaimard, 1834

= Clavelina cylindrica =

Species of sea squirt

Clavelina cylindrica is a species of tunicate in the genus Clavelina. It is found in shallow waters around Australia.

== Research ==
Clavelina cylindrica has yielded two novel alkaloids in 1993, cylindricine A, the first naturally occurring pyrrolo[2, 1-j]quinoline, and cylindricine B, a pyrido-[2,1-j]-quinoline ring compound. Further research the following year led to the discovery of further cylindricines C to G, and a further three, H to J in 1995.
