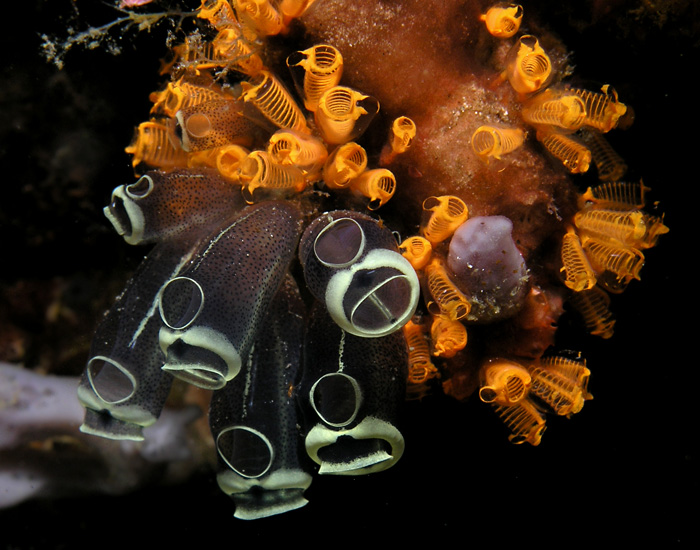
- Clavelina robusta (black and white in colour shown at the lower left of the image)

Scientific classification
- Domain: Eukaryota
- Kingdom: Animalia
- Phylum: Chordata
- Subphylum: Tunicata
- Class: Ascidiacea
- Order: Aplousobranchia
- Family: Clavelinidae
- Genus: Clavelina
- Species: C. robusta

Binomial name
- Clavelina robusta (Kott, 1990)

= Clavelina robusta =

Species of sea squirt

Clavelina robusta is a species of tunicate (sea squirt), in the genus Clavelina (the "little bottles"). Like all ascidians, these sessile animals are filter feeders.

== Description ==
This species frequently occurs in dense clusters. It has large 2–4 cm cylindrical zooids. They generally range from black to dark blue to gray in colour, with individual zooids having fluorescent green, yellow, or white rings around both siphons. The external cover has a firm basal matrix, and is somewhat transparent and soft.

== Distribution ==
Clavelina robusta is found, often in large colonies, in the Western Pacific, Australia, Indonesia, the Philippines, Japan, and the Solomon Islands.
