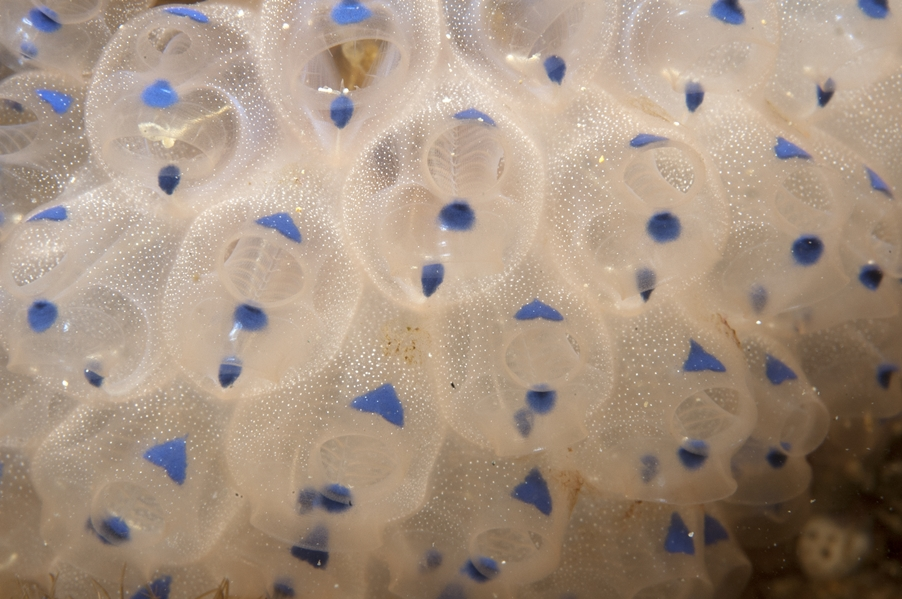
- Colony of Clavelina australis around Victoria, Australia

Scientific classification
- Kingdom: Animalia
- Phylum: Chordata
- Subphylum: Tunicata
- Class: Ascidiacea
- Order: Aplousobranchia
- Family: Clavelinidae
- Genus: Clavelina
- Species: C. australis

Binomial name
- Clavelina australis (Herdman, 1899)

= Clavelina australis =

Species of colonial ascidian

Clavelina australis is a species of colonial ascidian from Australia, in the family Clavelinidae.

== History ==
The species was first described under the name Stereoclavella australis in 1898 by William Abbott Herdman, although that taxon was considered a nomen nudum. A formal taxonomic description of the species was written by Herdman the next year, alongside a tentatively named Stereoclavella sp. ?australis from Broughton Island. The two descriptions differed in the structure of their dorsal languets, united in the latter by a longitudinal band but directly joined to the horizontal membranes in S. australis.

The original genus Stereoclavella was later synonymized with Clavelina, giving the tunicate its currently accepted binomial name.

== Description ==
Like most ascidians, Clavelina australis is a sessile, colonial filter-feeder. Colonies are made of a large number of zooids emerging from a solid stalk-like test. They can average 9 centimetres (3.5 in) in width, while individual zooids are much smaller, around 2 centimetres (0.79 in) in length and 5 millimetres (0.20 in) in width.

== Distribution and habitat ==
Clavelina australis is known from the waters of southeastern Australia. Colonies anchor themselves on rocks and coral reefs in shallow waters, at up to 20 metres (66 ft) of depth.

== Taxonomy ==
Inside the genus Clavelina, the closest relative of C. australis has been found to be C. ossipandae, the skeleton panda sea squirt, following the latter's description in 2024.
