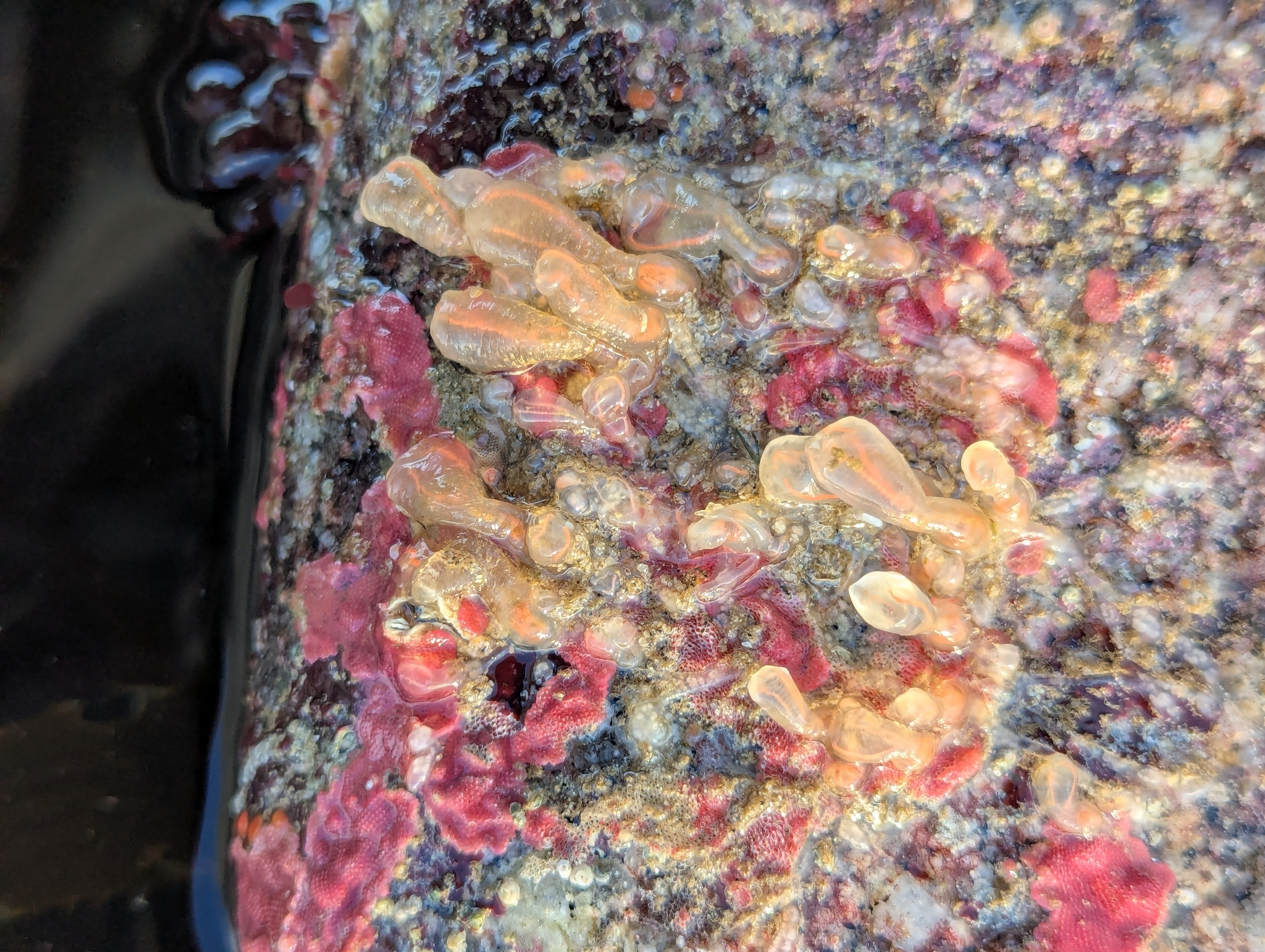

Scientific classification
- Kingdom: Animalia
- Phylum: Chordata
- Subphylum: Tunicata
- Class: Ascidiacea
- Order: Aplousobranchia
- Family: Clavelinidae
- Genus: Clavelina
- Species: C. huntsmani

Binomial name
- Clavelina huntsmani Van Name, 1931

= Clavelina huntsmani =

Species of sea squirt

Clavelina huntsmani, the lightbulb tunicate, is a species of tunicate in the family Clavelinidae. It is found on rocks from the low intertidal to a depth of 30 meters, from British Columbia to San Diego, California.

== Description ==
The lightbulb tunicate is named for two distinct pink lines, formed by the dorsal lamina and endostyle of each zooid, which resemble the filaments of a light bulb. Individual zooids are nearly transparent, each 2-4 cm tall and 5-10 mm in diameter, forming clusters up to 50 cm across.

== Natural history ==
The abundance of the lightbulb tunicate varies by the season, with reduced populations in autumn and increased populations in late winter. The organism broods its larvae during the summer, and when the young zooids form, they are initially attached to other zooids, although they later separate as adults.
