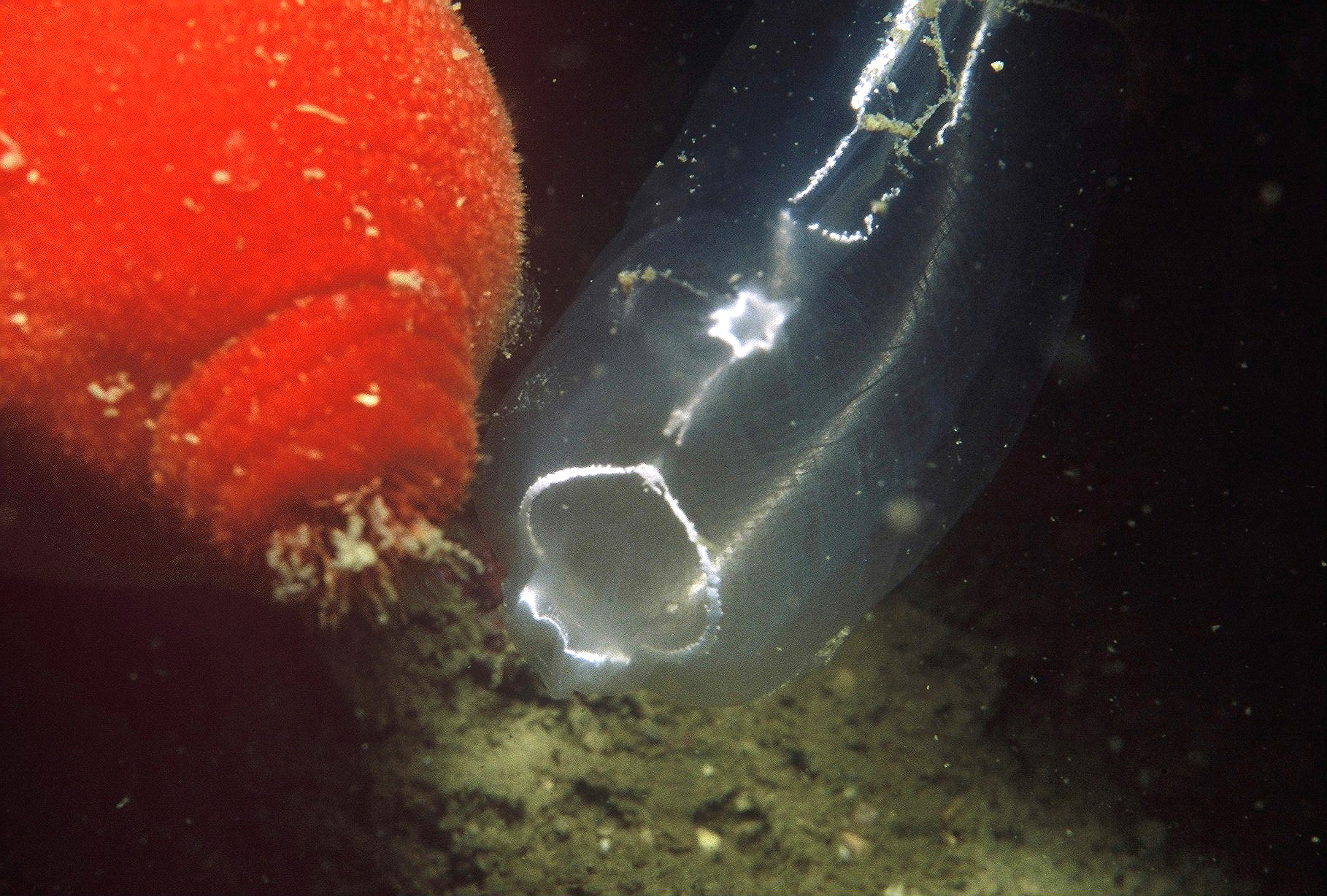

Scientific classification
- Domain: Eukaryota
- Kingdom: Animalia
- Phylum: Chordata
- Subphylum: Tunicata
- Class: Ascidiacea
- Order: Aplousobranchia
- Family: Clavelinidae
- Genus: Clavelina
- Species: C. sabbadini

Binomial name
- Clavelina sabbadini (Brunetti, 1987)

= Clavelina sabbadini =

Species of sea squirt

Clavelina sabbadini is a species of tunicate (sea squirt), in the genus Clavelina (the "little bottles"). Like all ascidians, these sessile animals are filter feeders.

== Distribution ==
This species is found in European waters and in the Mediterranean Sea.
