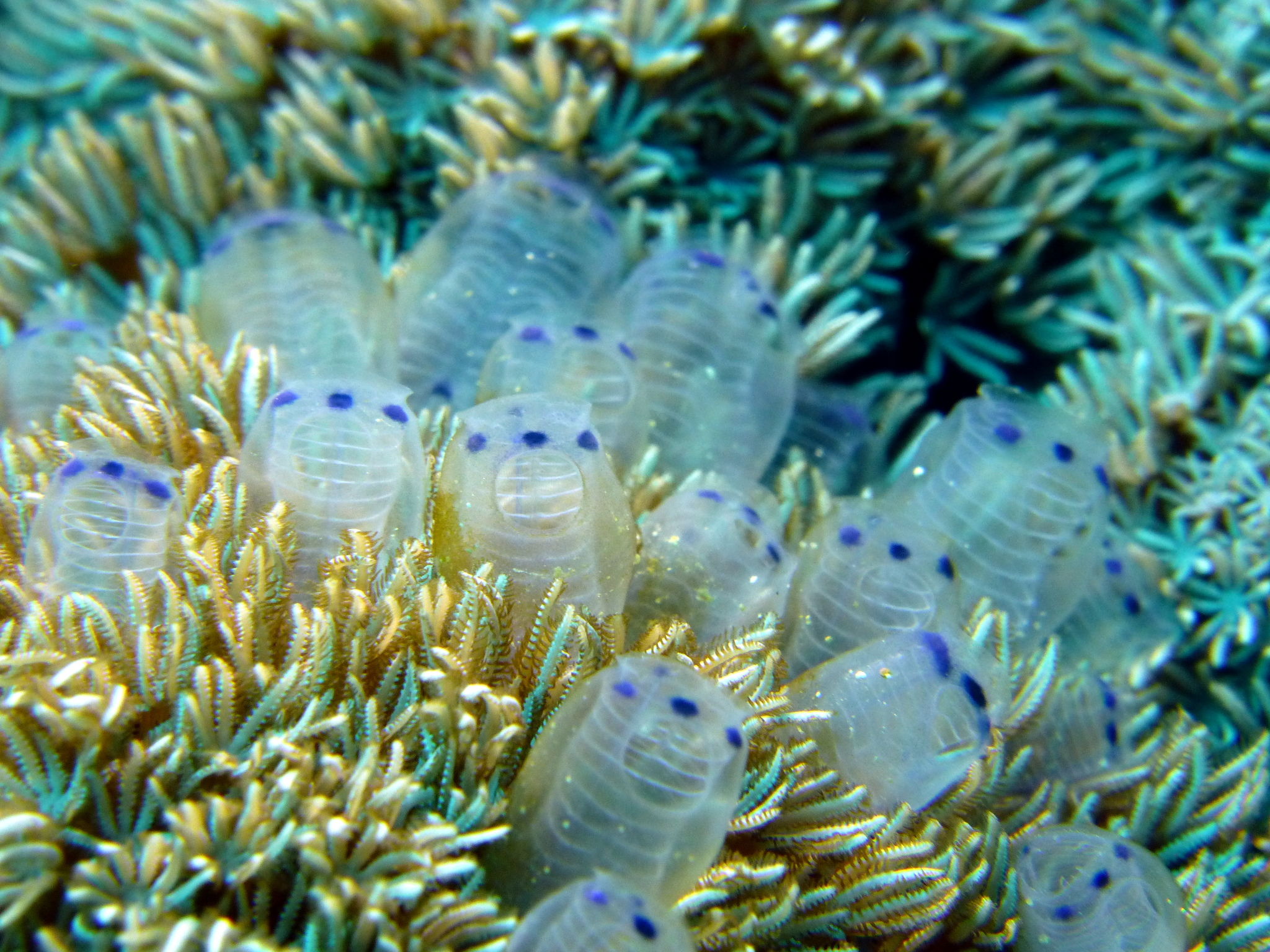
- A colony of Clavelina molluccensis, showing the characteristic row of three blue dots between the siphons

Scientific classification
- Kingdom: Animalia
- Phylum: Chordata
- Subphylum: Tunicata
- Class: Ascidiacea
- Order: Aplousobranchia
- Family: Clavelinidae
- Genus: Clavelina
- Species: C. moluccensis

Binomial name
- Clavelina moluccensis (Sluiter, 1904)

Synonyms
- Clavelina molluccensis (Sluiter, 1904) (misspelling in literature); Podoclavella moluccensis Sluiter, 1904

= Clavelina moluccensis =

Species of tunicate

Clavelina moluccensis, common name bluebell tunicate, blue bell tunicate, or blue sea squirt is a species of tunicate (sea squirt), in the genus Clavelina (the "little bottles"). Like all ascidians, these sessile animals are filter feeders.

== Description ==
This species is 0.5-2.5 cm long, and light to medium blue in colour. The top of the zooids contain characteristic dark blue patches and spots that are always visible.

== Distribution ==
This species is found in the waters around Australia, Western Pacific, Indonesia, Papua New Guinea, Mariana Islands, Philippines, Singapore, and Malaysia.

== Habitat ==
This species grows in clusters attached to dead coral or other hard substrates, normally under overhangs.
