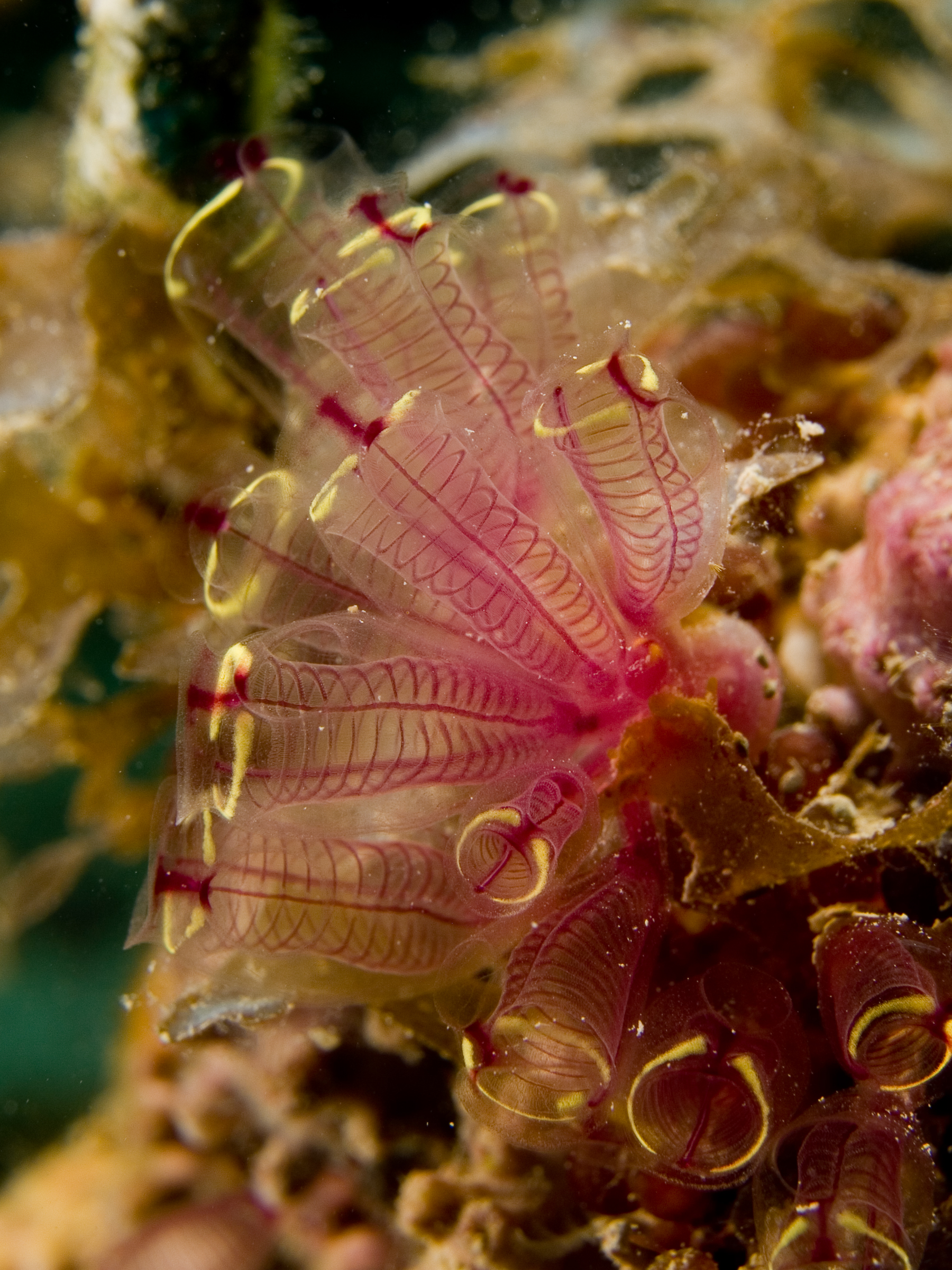

Scientific classification
- Kingdom: Animalia
- Phylum: Chordata
- Subphylum: Tunicata
- Class: Ascidiacea
- Order: Aplousobranchia
- Family: Clavelinidae
- Genus: Clavelina
- Species: C. picta

Binomial name
- Clavelina picta (Verrill, 1900)

Synonyms
- Aplidium crassum Herdman, 1886; Chondrostachys picta (Verrill, 1900); Diazona picta Verrill, 1900; Rhodozona picta (Verrill, 1900)

= Clavelina picta =

Species of sea squirt

Clavelina picta, common name the painted tunicate, is a species of tunicate (sea squirt), in the genus Clavelina (the "little bottles"). These animals, like all ascidians, are sessile filter feeders.

== Description ==
Clavelina picta have variable cool colours. The rims of the siphons are reddish to dark purple. Their bodies are translucent.

Clavelina picta are invertebrate filter feeders that feed by inducing a current into the branchial cavity from the incurrent siphon, with the help of the endostyle using cilia. Mucous glands in the endostyle secrete mucus used to filter through the incoming water and food particles. Once sorted, the mucus is moved by cilia to move food into the esophagus along the dorsal groove. The diet of a tunicate is mostly made of algae and plankton. Tunicates also have tentacles that keep larger particles from entering the oral siphon.

Tunicates, including C. picta, also have defensive measures such as acids or allelochemicals to inhibit microbes and predator organisms from infecting or consuming them. These properties make them valuable to pharmaceutical companies. Vanadium, an elemental metal is also found in some tunicates, including C. picta, as a metabolic poison and this can help make them unpalatable to predators.

== Taxonomy ==
Under the phylum Chordata, the Urochordates or Tunicata, do not have vertebrae but as larvae they have dorsal nerve cords and notochords. Tunicate larvae are also free-swimming and look like tadpoles. Larvae lose these distinctions when developing into an adult. This is hypothesized to be related to the habitat tunicates have adapted to. Tunicates are the closest living relative to vertebrates.

== Distribution ==
This species is found in the waters of Florida, Bahamas, and the Caribbean. Colonies are found in or around reefs and are mesopelagic benthic organisms staying towards the shore.

== Habitat ==
Clavelina picta often occurs in large clusters attached to black coral, sponges, and gorgonians. Colonies may contain hundreds of individuals. C. picta form colonies that may contain hundreds of individuals. Larvae settle and use papillae to attach to a surface. The larvae use sensory organs to find a suitable habitat. These larval organs include eye spots and otoliths. The eye spot is used to detect light and otoliths to help orient the larvae to gravity.

Because of the toxicity or odor of their skin, tunicates have few predators but sharks, reef fish, sea stars, snails, and crabs will sometimes eat tunicates.

== Reproduction ==
Clavelina picta can reproduce through asexual and sexual means. Asexual reproduction occurs through blastogenesis. Blastogenesis is reproduction through budding where somatic tissues develop into an embryo. Sexual reproduction in tunicates occurs by a single egg being fertilized. For the most part, tunicates are hermaphroditic, meaning they possess sperm and egg to reproduce independently. Fertilization occurs in the water through spawning, where the tunicates will release sperm and eggs to be fertilized and the larvae will settle next to adults.
