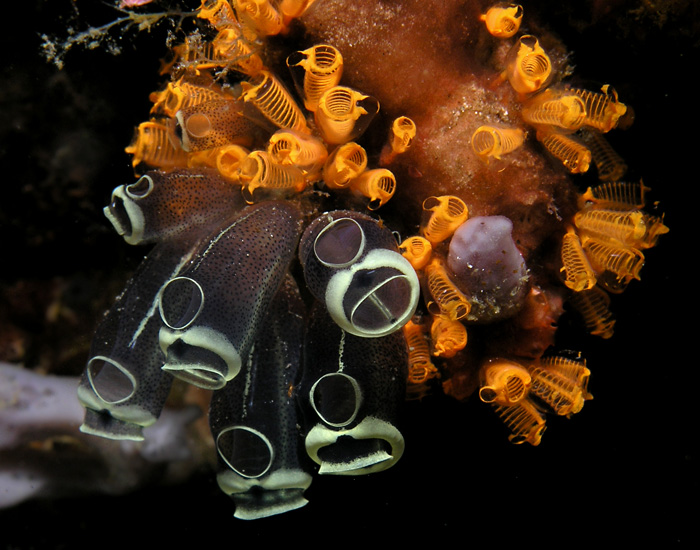
- Two species of colonial tunicates. Pycnoclavella flava is colored orange.

Scientific classification
- Domain: Eukaryota
- Kingdom: Animalia
- Phylum: Chordata
- Subphylum: Tunicata
- Class: Ascidiacea
- Order: Aplousobranchia
- Family: Clavelinidae
- Genus: Pycnoclavella
- Species: P. flava

Binomial name
- Pycnoclavella flava Monniot F., 1988

Synonyms
- Clavelina flava Monniot F., 1988

= Pycnoclavella flava =

Species of Ascidiacea

Pycnoclavella flava is a species of sea squirt found in New Caledonia. It can be found at depths of 0–22 m (0–72 ft) and measures up to 0.79 in (20 mm).
