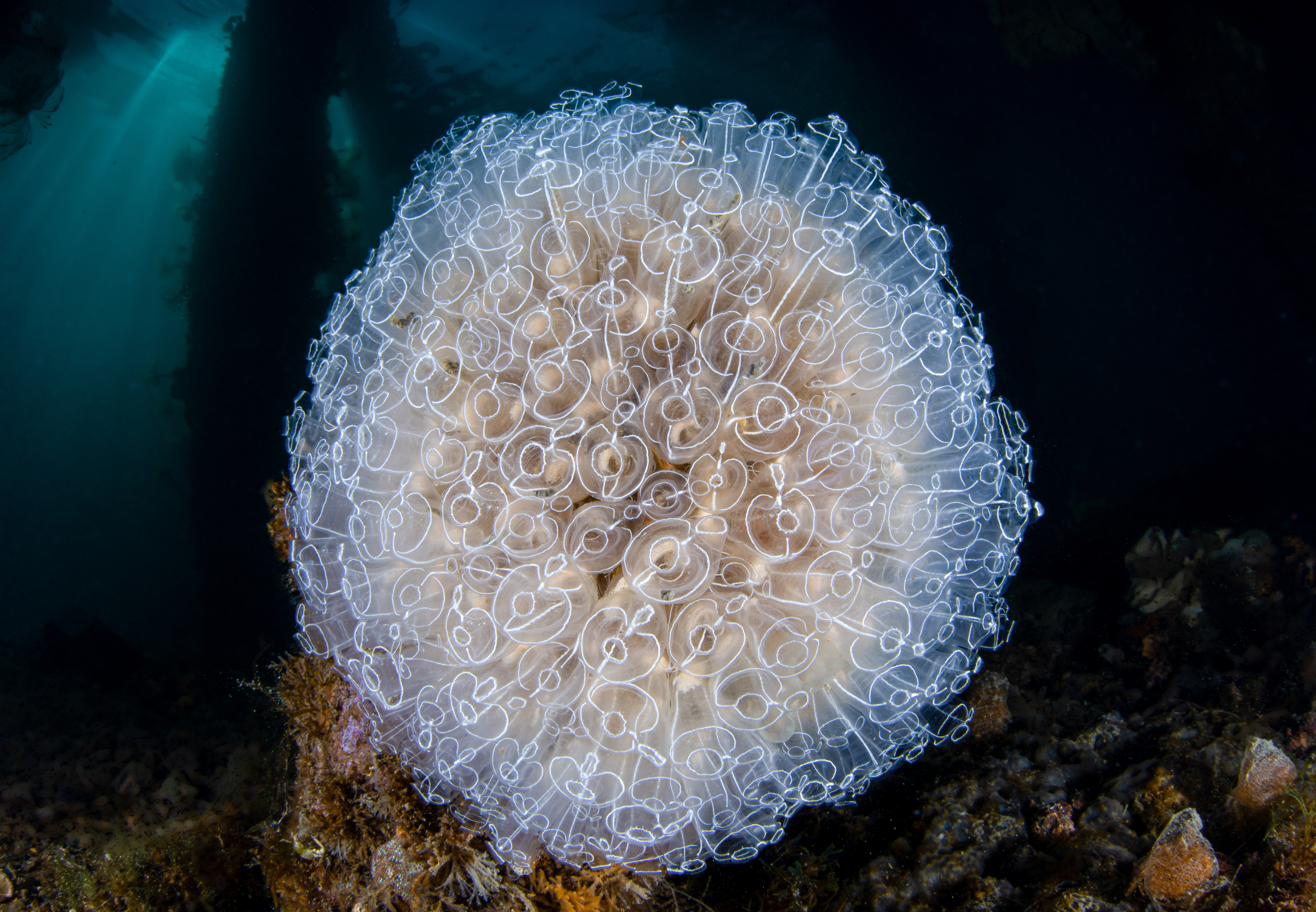

Scientific classification
- Domain: Eukaryota
- Kingdom: Animalia
- Phylum: Chordata
- Subphylum: Tunicata
- Class: Ascidiacea
- Order: Aplousobranchia
- Family: Clavelinidae
- Genus: Clavelina
- Species: C. lepadiformis

Binomial name
- Clavelina lepadiformis (Müller, 1776)

Synonyms
- Ascidia lepadiformis Müller, 1776 (basionym); Clavelina pumillo Milne Edwards, 1841; Clavelina rissoana Milne Edwards, 1841; Clavelina savigniana Milne Edwards, 1841

= Clavelina lepadiformis =

Species of sea squirt

Clavelina lepadiformis, common name the light-bulb sea squirt, is a colonial sea squirt native to the NE Atlantic Ocean.

== Distribution ==
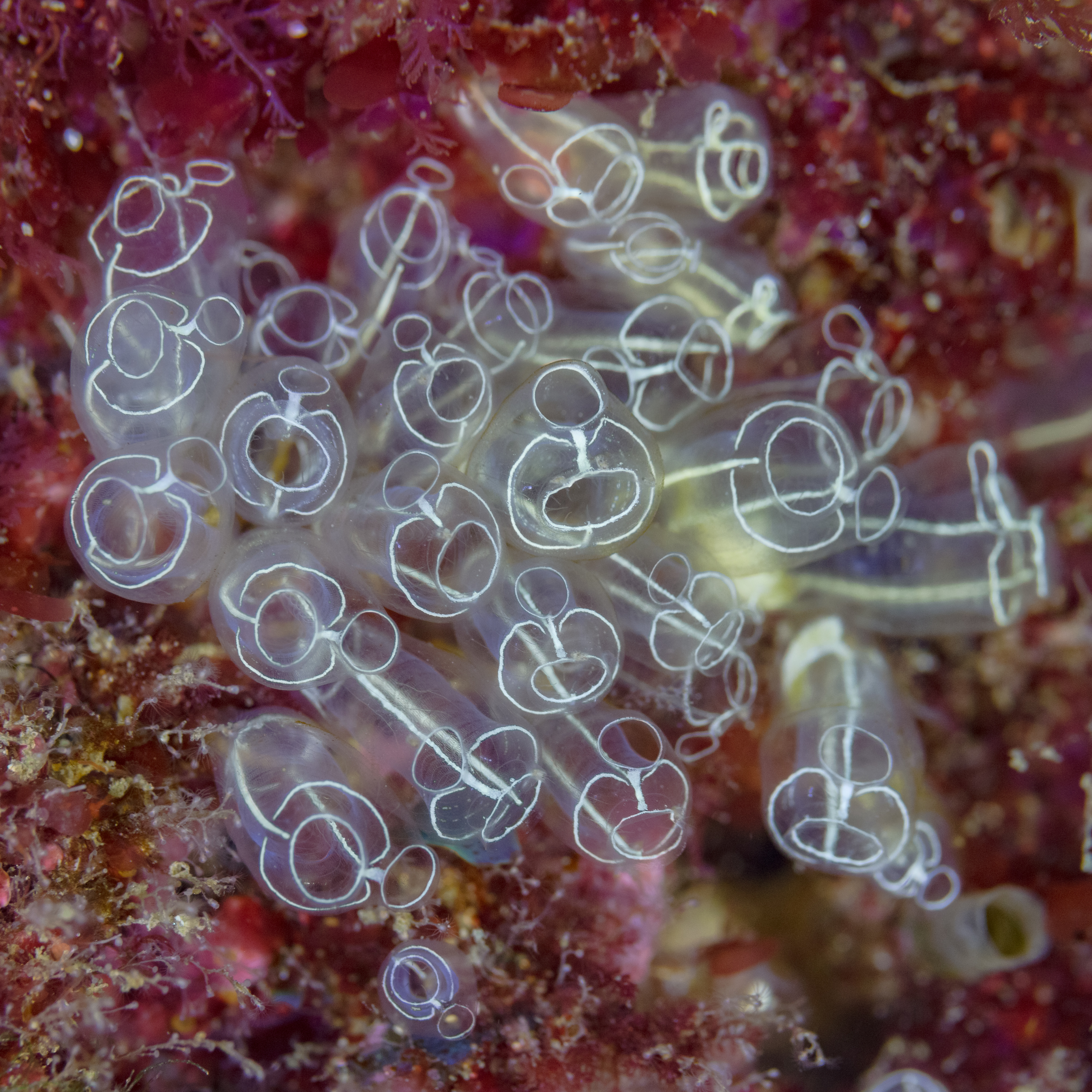
Light-bulb sea squirt colony

This species is a common shallow-water ascidian in Great Britain and Ireland. It occurs from Norway along European coasts south to the Mediterranean. In the Mediterranean the presence of cryptic species has been demonstrated.

== Description ==
The transparent tunic and visible yellow or white internal organs give this animal its common name.
