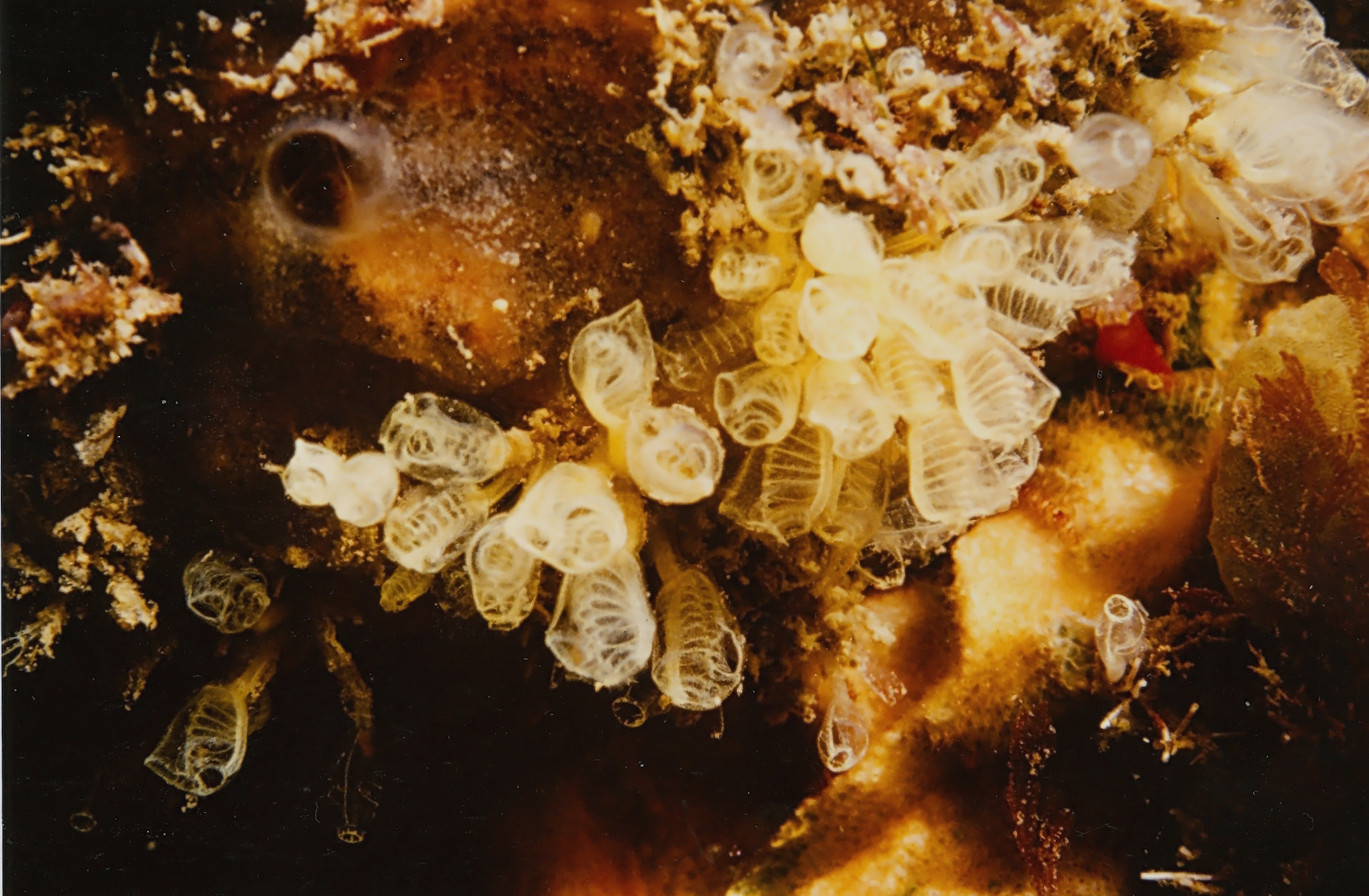
- Pycnoclavella taureanensis

Scientific classification
- Domain: Eukaryota
- Kingdom: Animalia
- Phylum: Chordata
- Subphylum: Tunicata
- Class: Ascidiacea
- Order: Aplousobranchia
- Family: Clavelinidae
- Genus: Pycnoclavella; Garstang, 1891

Type species
- Pycnoclavella aurilucens Garstang, 1891

Synonyms
- Archiascidia Julin, 1904

= Pycnoclavella =

Genus of sea squirts

Pycnoclavella is a genus of sea squirts first circumscribed by Walter Garstang in 1891. The generic name comes from the Ancient Greek πυκνός (puknós) meaning "closely united". In 1990, Patricia Kott placed Pycnoclavella in its own family, Pycnoclavellidae, but in 2008 it was moved back to Clavelinidae.

As of 2018, WoRMS recognizes the following species:

- Pycnoclavella arenosa (Kott, 1972)
- Pycnoclavella atlantica Pérez-Portela et al., 2007
- Pycnoclavella aurantia Kott, 1990
- Pycnoclavella aurilucens Garstang, 1891
- Pycnoclavella belizeana Goodbody, 1996
- Pycnoclavella brava Pérez-Portela et al., 2007
- Pycnoclavella communis Pérez-Portela et al., 2007
- Pycnoclavella detorta (Sluiter, 1904)
- Pycnoclavella diminuta (Kott, 1957)
- Pycnoclavella elongata Kott, 1990
- Pycnoclavella filamentosa Kott, 2005
- Pycnoclavella flava (Monniot F., 1988)
- Pycnoclavella inflorescens Kott, 2005
- Pycnoclavella kottae Millar, 1960
- Pycnoclavella martae Perez-Portela & Turon, 2008
- Pycnoclavella minuta Millar, 1953
- Pycnoclavella nana (Lahille, 1890)
- Pycnoclavella narcissus Kott, 2005
- Pycnoclavella neapolitana (Julin, 1904)
- Pycnoclavella producta (Milne Edwards, 1841)
- Pycnoclavella stanleyi Berrill & Abbott, 1949
- Pycnoclavella stolonialis Pérez-Portela et al., 2010
- Pycnoclavella tabella Kott, 1990
- Pycnoclavella taureanensis Brunetti, 1991
