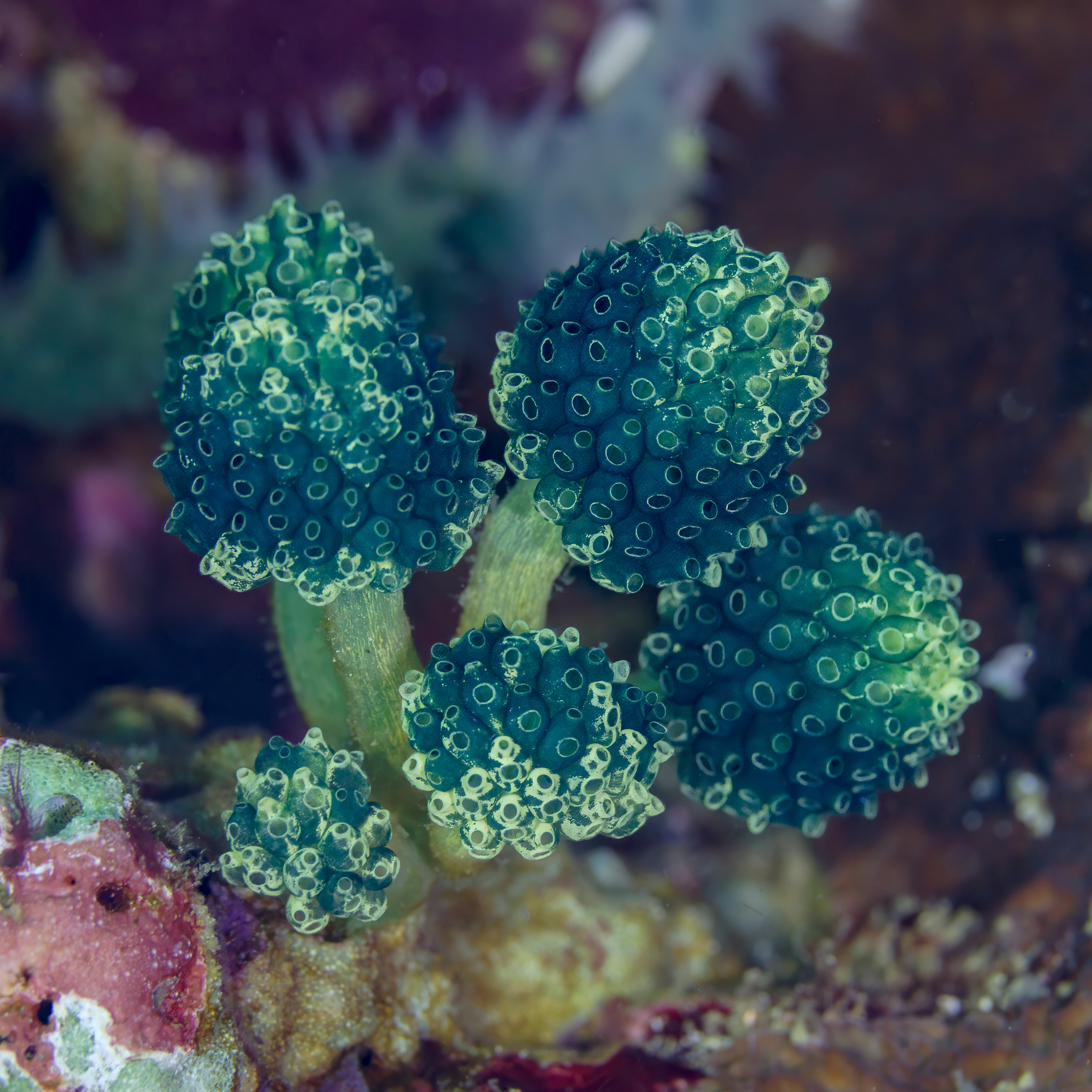

Scientific classification
- Domain: Eukaryota
- Kingdom: Animalia
- Phylum: Chordata
- Subphylum: Tunicata
- Class: Ascidiacea
- Order: Aplousobranchia
- Family: Clavelinidae
- Genus: Nephtheis; Gould, 1856
- Species: N. fascicularis

Binomial name
- Nephtheis fascicularis (Drasche, 1882)

Synonyms
- Genus synonymy: Oxycorynia Drasche, 1882; Species synonymy: Colella thompsoni Herdman, 1886; Colella thomsoni Herdman, 1886; Nephtheis centripetens Sluiter, 1909; Nephtheis faciformis Sluiter, 1909; Nephtheis fascularis (Drasche, 1882); Nephtheis malayensis Sluiter, 1909; Nephtheis thompsoni (Herdman, 1886); Nephtheis thomsoni (Herdman, 1886); Oxycorynia fascicularis Drasche, 1882; Oxycorynia thompsoni (Herdman, 1886)

= Nephtheis =

Genus of sea squirts

Nephtheis fascicularis, commonly called the lollipop tunicate, lollipop coral, or blue palm coral, is a species of tunicate that is native to the shallow reefs of Indonesia. It is the only species in its genus Nephtheis. They are not photosynthetic, and live on plankton and small organic particles obtained from the water currents. The branched stems are formed by tiny polyps called zooids. Despite their name and appearance, they and other sea squirts are unrelated to true corals.
