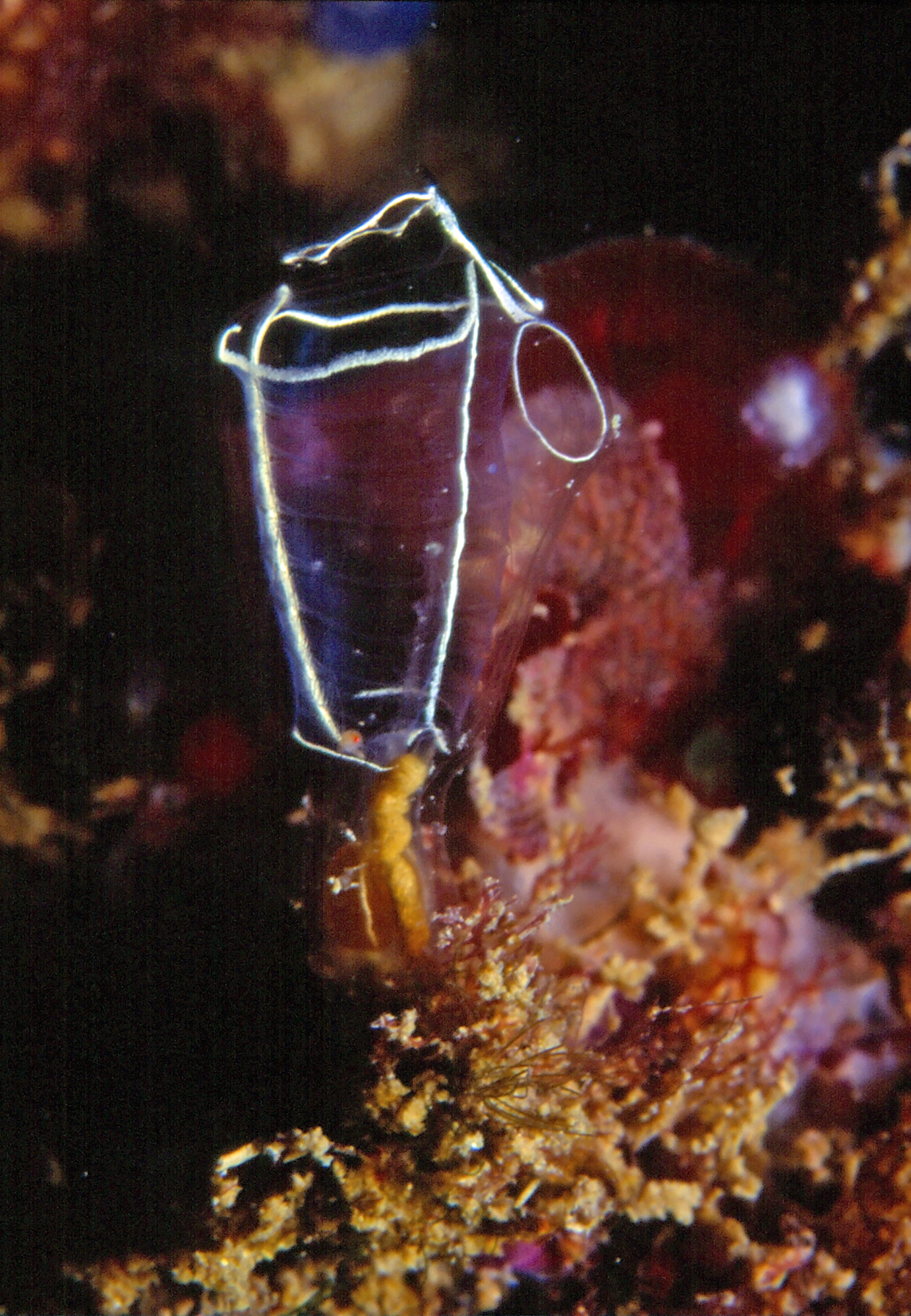
- Clavelina lepadiformis

Scientific classification
- Kingdom: Animalia
- Phylum: Chordata
- Subphylum: Tunicata
- Class: Ascidiacea
- Order: Aplousobranchia
- Family: Clavelinidae; Forbes & Hanley, 1848

Type genus
- Clavelina Savigny, 1816

Synonyms
- Pycnoclavellidae Kott, 1990

= Clavelinidae =

Family of sea squirts

Clavelinidae is a family of tunicates in the order Aplousobranchia.

== Genera ==
As of 2024, WoRMS recognizes the following genera in the family Clavelinidae:

- Clavelina Savigny, 1816
- Euclavella Kott, 1990
- Nephtheis Gould, 1856
- Pycnoclavella Garstang, 1891

== Phylogeny ==
Pycnoclavella has occasionally been placed in a separate family, Pycnoclavellidae, although phylogenetic studies have recovered it as a relative of Clavelina. In multiple analyses, the monotypic genus Nephtheis appears to branch from within Clavelina.
