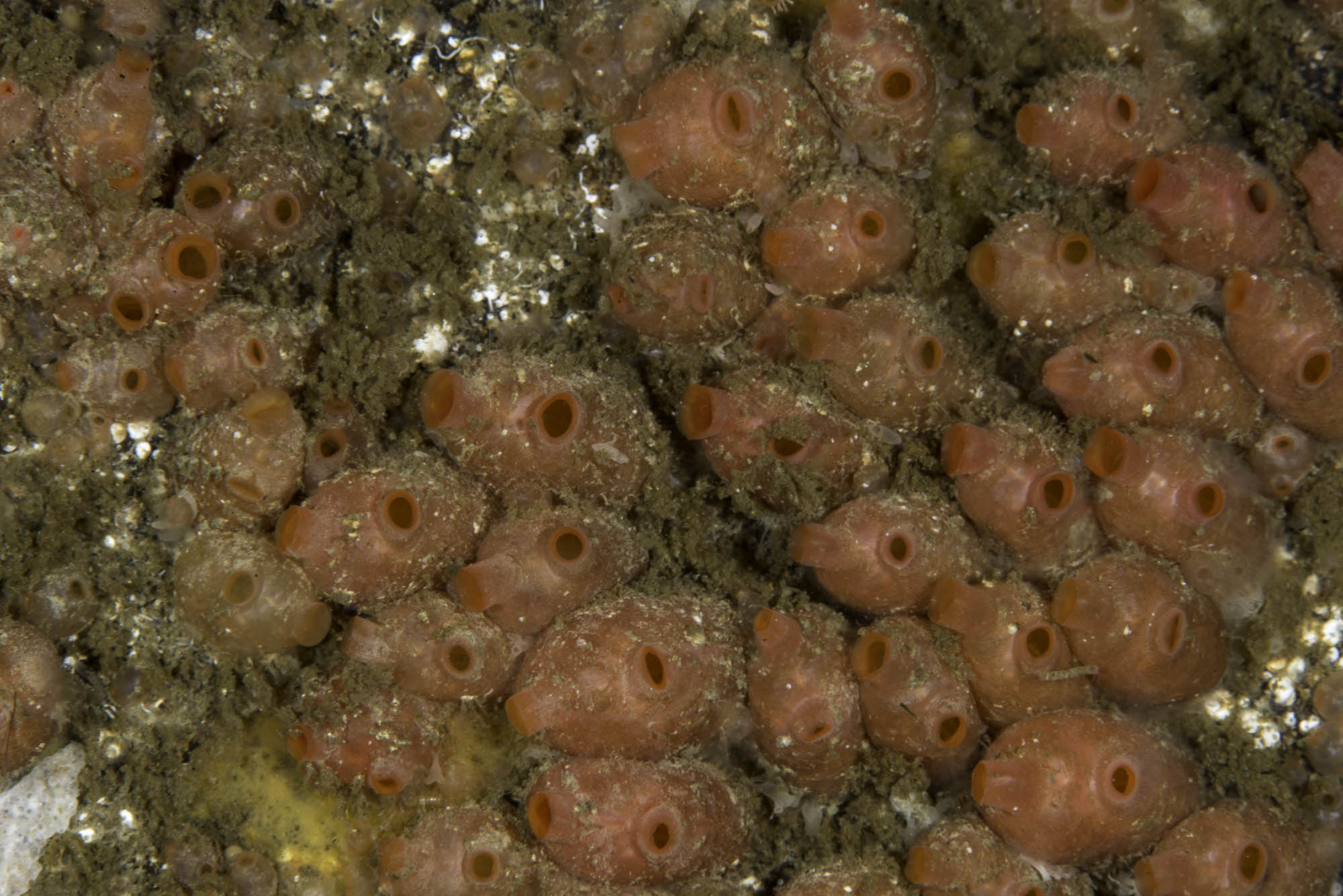
- The sea squirt Dendrodoa grossularia, Isle of Man, Irish Sea

Scientific classification
- Kingdom: Animalia
- Phylum: Chordata
- Subphylum: Tunicata
- Class: Ascidiacea
- Order: Stolidobranchia
- Family: Styelidae
- Genus: Dendrodoa
- Species: D. grossularia

Binomial name
- Dendrodoa grossularia (van Beneden, 1846)

Synonyms
- Ascidia grossularia Beneden, 1846; Cynthia grossularia (Beneden, 1846); Styela grossularia (Beneden, 1846); Styelopsis grossularia (Beneden, 1846); Styelopsis sphaerica Alder & Hancock, 1907

= Dendrodoa grossularia =

Species of tunicates

Dendrodoa grossularia is a species of tunicate or sea squirt in the family Styelidae, commonly known as the baked bean ascidian. It is native to the northeastern Atlantic Ocean where it is common in shallow water and on the lower shore in exposed rocky sites.

== Description ==
Dendrodoa grossularia is sometimes known as the sea currant because of its small, red, globular form. It usually grows in aggregations, forming mats across the rock surface, but occasionally occurs as individual zooids. When crowded together, the zooids are cylindrical, 20 to 25 mm (0.8 to 1.0 in) tall and half as wide. Each individual has the two circular siphons near the apex, the buccal siphon being slightly larger than the exhalent siphon. The tunic is smooth, translucent and of fairly firm consistency, and the siphons tend to be a more intense colour than the rest of the tunic. Solitary individuals are smaller, depressed and unnoticeable. The tunic often has sand or silt deposited on it and sometimes supports epibionts. This species could be confused with Distomus variolosus or Stolonica socialis; the former is smaller, never more than 10 mm (0.4 in) tall, while the latter is a colonial species with a creeping stolon, and is orange or orangish-brown.

== Distribution and habitat ==
This species is widely distributed in the northeastern Atlantic Ocean. Its range includes the Baltic Sea, the English Channel, and northwestern France as far south as Quiberon, but it is absent from some localities and has a number of sub-populations. Colonies grows on rocks and boulders in areas with strong currents, and sometimes on the holdfasts of kelp, at depths from the lower shore down to a few metres. It favours shaded rocks, boulders, ledges and overhangs, and can form large populations in suitable habitats. Single zooids may be attached to stones or mollusc shells, alive or dead. At exceptionally low tides, it may be found under overhanging rocks on the lower shore. It is tolerant of low salinities and may be found in estuaries.

== Ecology ==
Like all tunicates, Dendrodoa grossularia is a filter feeder, drawing water in through the buccal siphon and expelling it through the exhalent siphon. It is a non-simultaneous hermaphrodite. Sperm is emitted into the water column and drawn into other individuals, fertilising the ova in the body cavity. The embryos are brooded here, before being liberated into the water as tadpole-like larvae. After a short planktonic period, some settle onto the tunics of adult individuals.

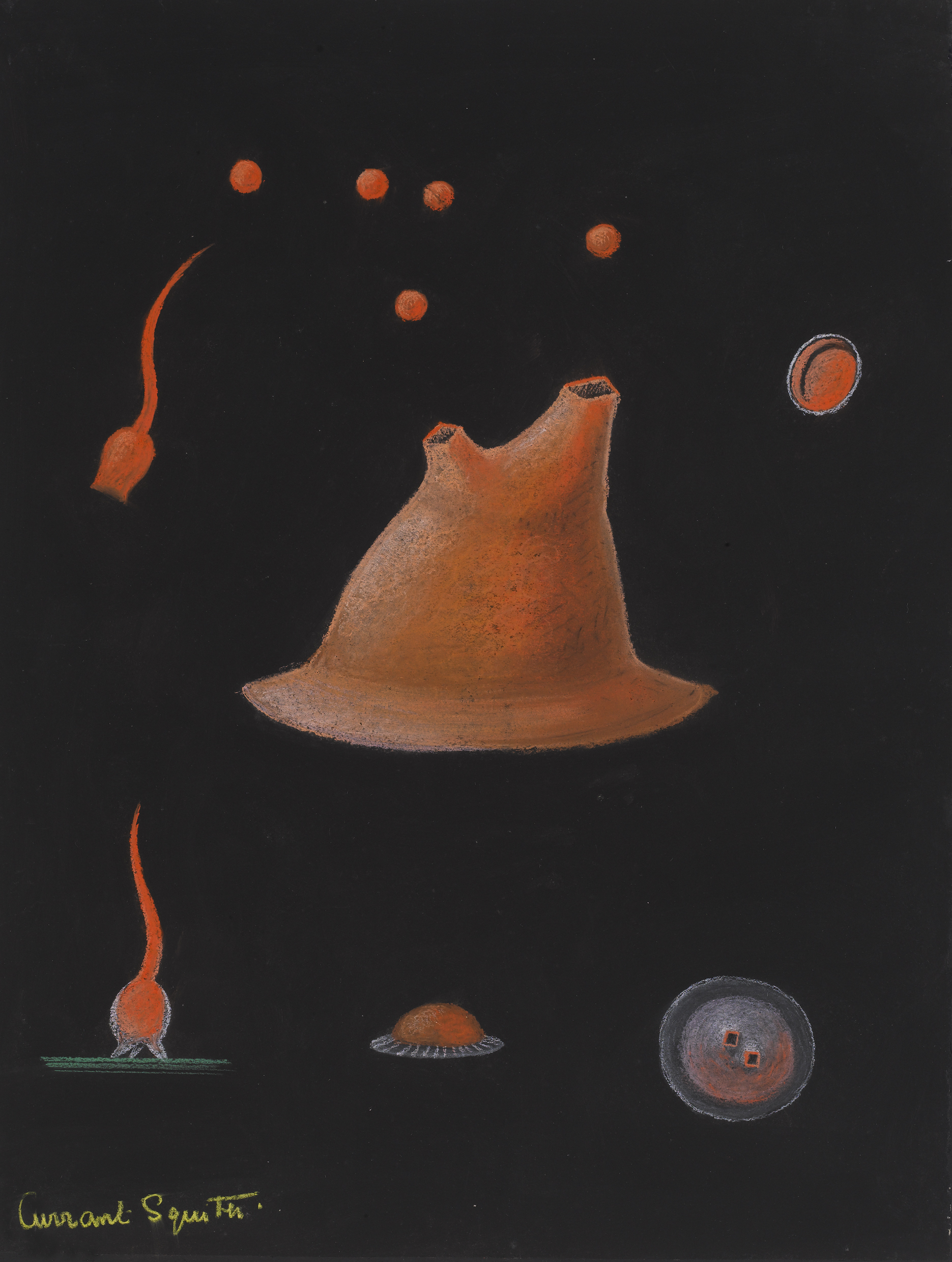
Currant squirter Dendrodoa grossularia by Philip Henry Gosse
