= Stolonica socialis =

Scientific classification
- Kingdom: Animalia
- Phylum: Chordata
- Subphylum: Tunicata
- Class: Ascidiacea
- Order: Stolidobranchia
- Family: Styelidae
- Genus: Stolonica
- Species: S. socialis

Binomial name
- Stolonica socialis Hartmeyer, 1903

Species of sea squirt

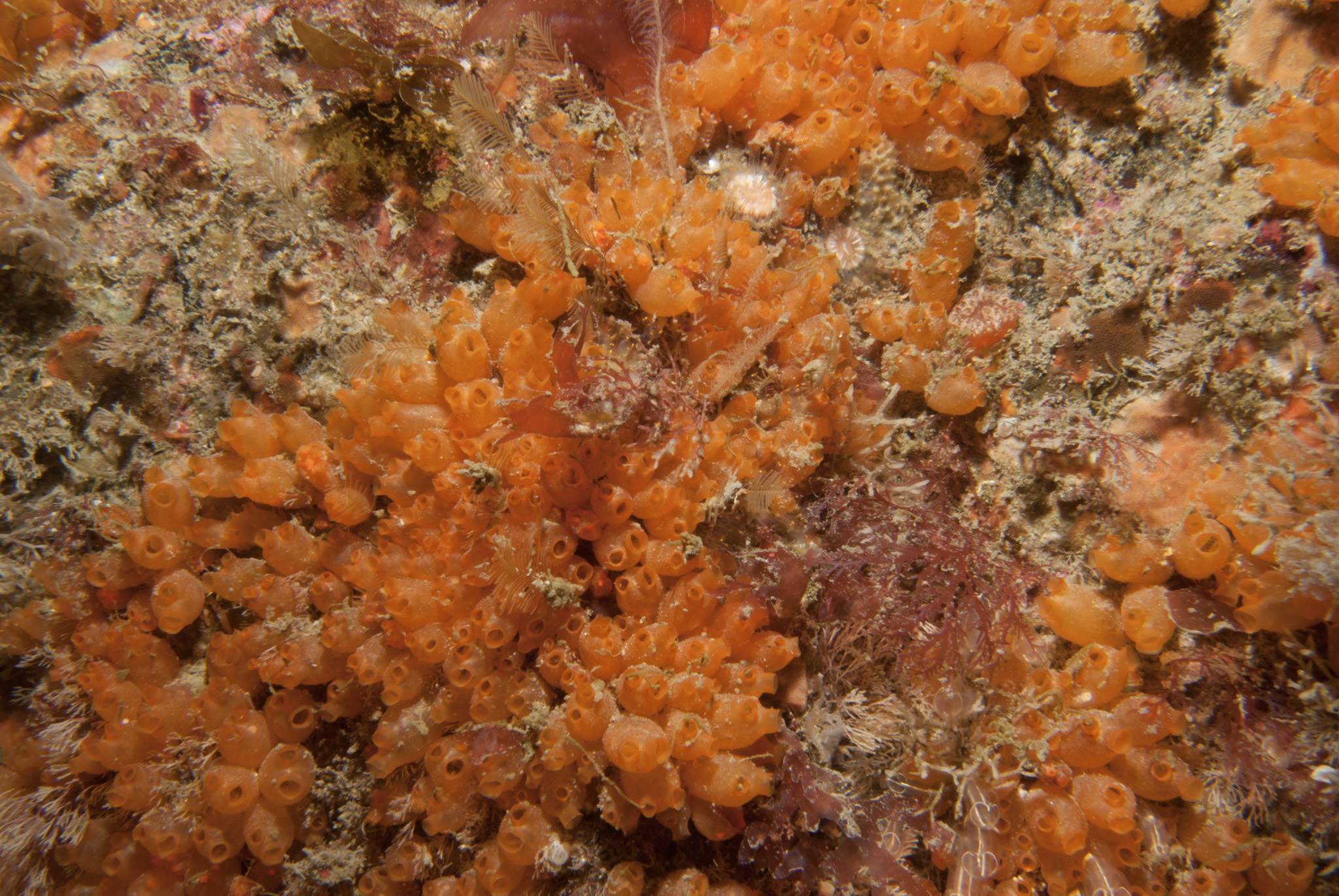
Stolonica socialis

Stolonica socialis is a species of tunicate or sea squirt in the family Styelidae, commonly known as orange sea grapes. It is native to the northeastern Atlantic Ocean, where it lives on the rocky seabed in shallow water.

== Description ==
Stolonica socialis is a colonial tunicate forming small clusters of zooids, joined at the base by a mat of stolons. Each zooid is up to 2 cm (0.8 in) high, rectangular or ovoid. Both of the small siphons on each zooid are situated near the apex. The outer surface of each zooids is smooth and sand does not adhere to it, although sand does adhere to the mat of stolons. Although most colonies are orange, some are yellow and others pale brown. The colonies spread across the rocks and can form large sheets. In winter, orange-red buds develop on the stolons. Similar species with which it could be confused include Dendrodoa grossularia and Distomus variolosus, but both of these are red.

== Distribution ==
Stolonica socialis is found in the northeastern Atlantic Ocean, the Irish Sea and the English Channel. Its range includes the coasts of northwestern Ireland and southeastern Ireland, Wales, southwestern England and northwestern France. It grows on rocks, including those swept by strong currents, at depths from 5 to 35 m (16 to 115 ft) or more. It favours shaded rocks, boulders and overhangs, and can form large populations. At exceptionally low tides, it may be found under overhanging rocks on the foreshore.

== Biology ==
Like other tunicates, Stolonica socialis is a filter feeder, water being sucked into the hollow body of each zooid via an inhalent siphon, large particles being rejected by tentacles at the siphon entrance. Edible particles are sieved out of the water stream, and the water is then pumped out through the exhalent siphon. The colony grows by the stolons extending across the rock surface and budding new zooids at intervals, with large patches of zooids often being formed. In winter these buds may remain dormant as small spherical outgrowths, and with the arrival of warmer weather in the spring, growth can restart and the spherules can develop into zooids. In adverse conditions, sexual reproduction takes place, with eggs and sperm being liberated into the water column.

The tissues of this tunicate contain stolonoxides, secondary metabolites that have been found to have cytotoxic effects; this may be the reason that the tunics remain largely clear of epibionts whereas many other tunicates are heavily colonised by other organisms.
