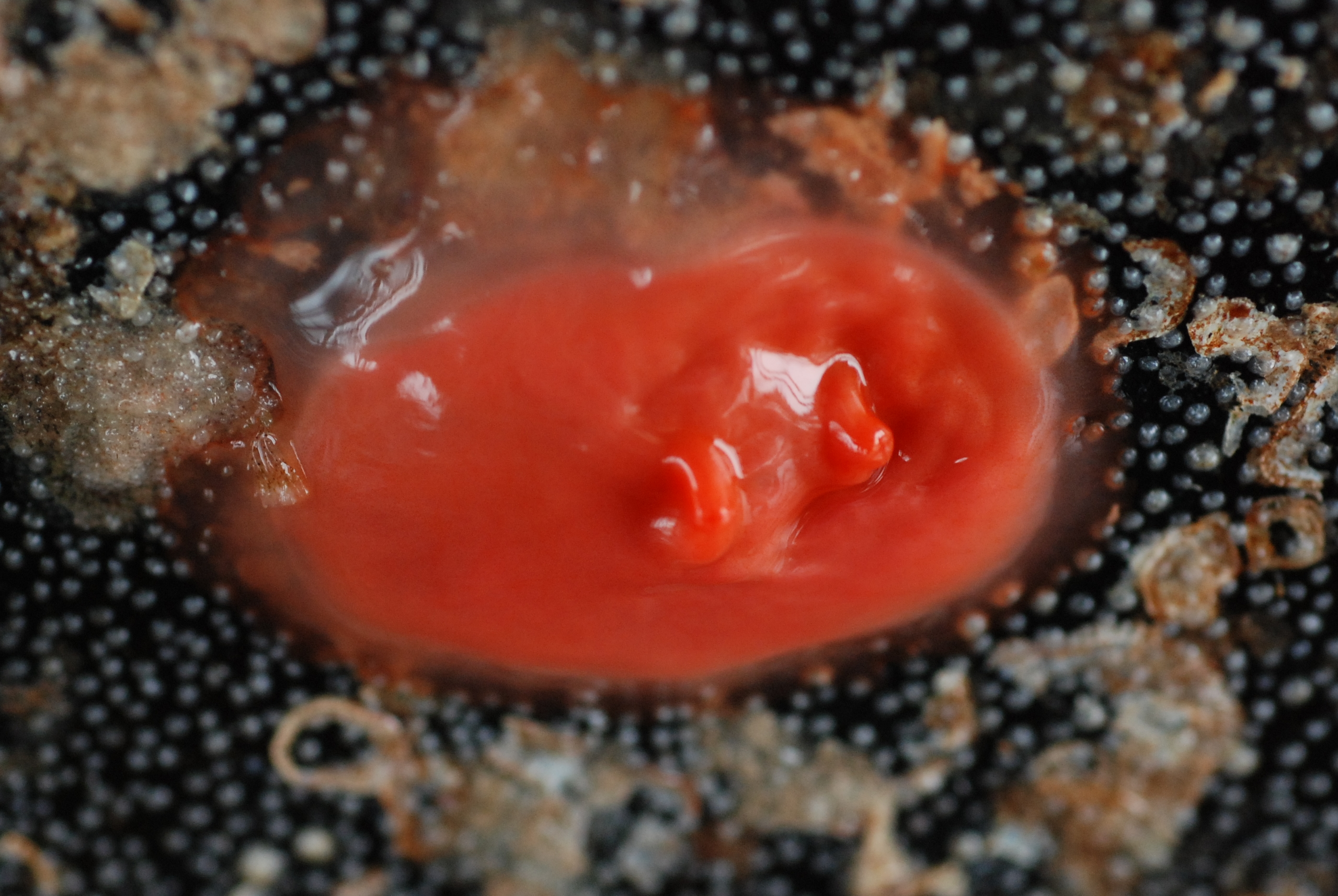

Scientific classification
- Kingdom: Animalia
- Phylum: Chordata
- Subphylum: Tunicata
- Class: Ascidiacea
- Order: Stolidobranchia
- Family: Styelidae
- Genus: Cnemidocarpa
- Species: C. finmarkiensis

Binomial name
- Cnemidocarpa finmarkiensis (Kiaer, 1893)

Synonyms
- Polycarpa finmarckiensis (Kiaer, 1893); Polycarpa finmarkiensis Kiaer, 1893; Styela finmarkiensis (Kiaer, 1893); Styela stimpsoni Ritter, 1900; Tethyum elsa (Hartmeyer, 1906); Tethyum finmarckiense (Kiaer, 1893); Tethyum finmarkiense (Kiaer, 1893); Tethyum stimpsoni (Ritter, 1900)

= Cnemidocarpa finmarkiensis =

Species of sea squirt

Cnemidocarpa finmarkiensis is a species of solitary ascidian tunicate in the family Styelidae. Common names include broad base sea squirt, orange sea squirt, red sea squirt, shiny orange sea squirt, shiny red tunicate and Finmark's tunicate. It is native to shallow waters in the northern and northeastern Pacific Ocean.

== Description ==
This is a solitary tunicate, which has no stalk, but adheres to the substrate with a broad base and often appears hemispherical. The two siphons are far apart and conspicuous when expanded, but much smaller when contracted, resembling small crosses. The length of this tunicate is seldom larger than 3 cm (1.2 in), but can exceptionally reach 5 cm (2 in), with a width of 2.5 cm (1 in). The tunic is thin, but strong, being smooth and shiny. It is often pearly or opaque in appearance, bright red or pinkish-red, but small individuals are often white. The tunic has a 12.4% organic content, more than half of which is cellulose (tunicin), the rest being protein.

== Distribution ==
This tunicate is a coldwater species and occurs in the northern and northeastern Pacific Ocean. It is circum-boreal in the Arctic and its range in the Pacific Northwest extends from Alaska to Point Conception in California. Its depth range extends from the low subtidal to at least 50 m (160 ft), but it occurs down to about 540 m (1,770 ft) in Japan.

== Ecology ==
Like other tunicates, Cnemidocarpa finmarkiensis is a suspension feeder; water is drawn into the body through the buccal siphon by the action of cilia lining the gill slits, the food particles are extracted and the water is expelled through the atrial siphon. It is a hermaphrodite, with breeding taking place in summer, fertilisation being external. A symbiotic copepod often lives inside the atrium and various invertebrates shelter around the tunicate's base. A predator of this tunicate is the rainbow star (Orthasterias koehleri).
