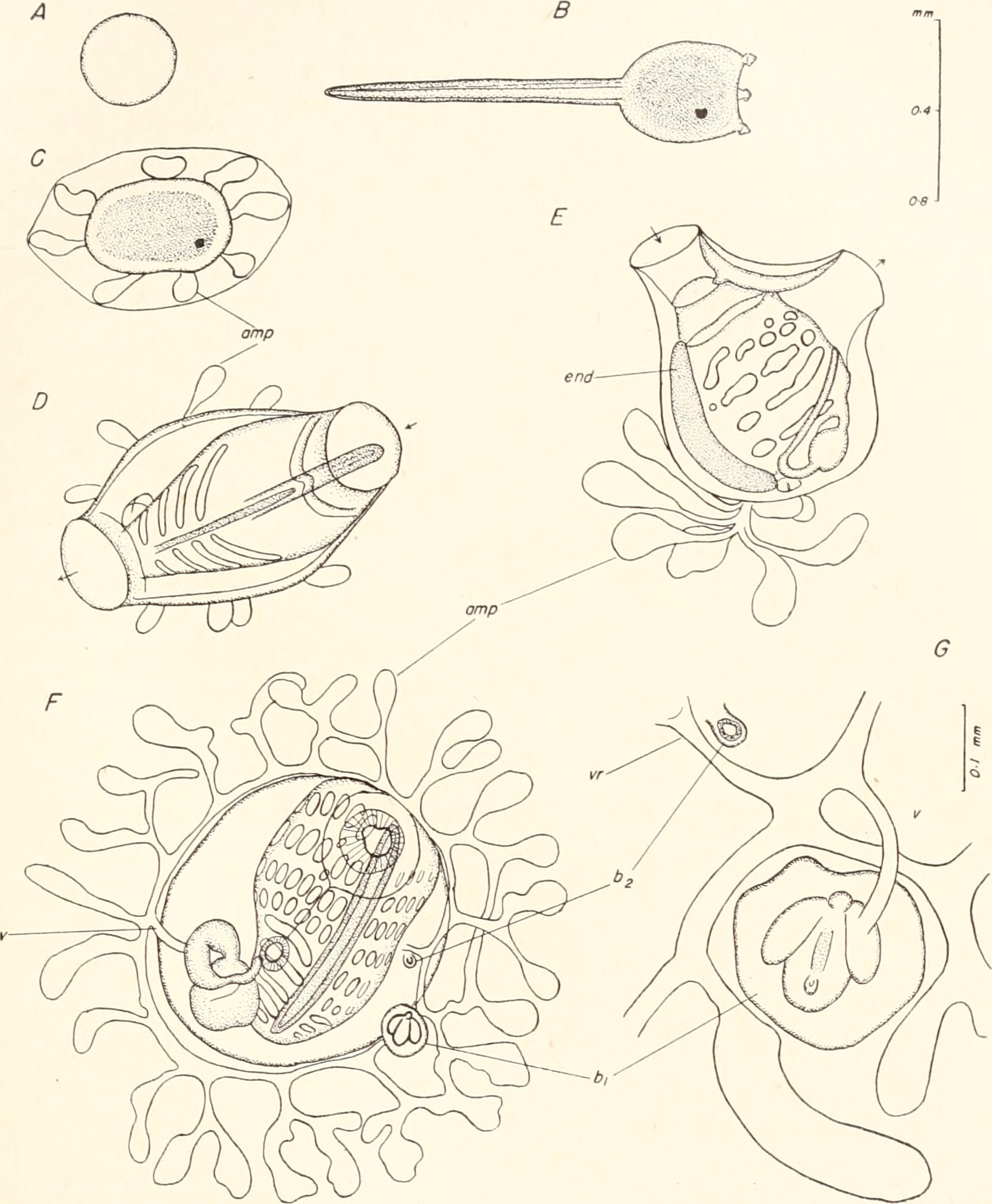
- Development from egg to first colonial organism

Scientific classification
- Kingdom: Animalia
- Phylum: Chordata
- Subphylum: Tunicata
- Class: Ascidiacea
- Order: Stolidobranchia
- Family: Styelidae
- Genus: Symplegma
- Species: S. viride

Binomial name
- Symplegma viride Herdman, 1886

Synonyms
- Diandrocarpa botryllopsis Van Name, 1902; Symplegma elegans Michaelsen, 1934; Symplegma viridis

= Symplegma viride =

Species of sea squirt

Symplegma viride is a species of ascidian tunicates in the family Styelidae.
