= Stolonica =

Scientific classification
- Kingdom: Animalia
- Phylum: Chordata
- Subphylum: Tunicata
- Class: Ascidiacea
- Order: Stolidobranchia
- Family: Styelidae
- Genus: Stolonica; Lacaze-Duthiers & Délage, 1892

Species
- See text

Genus of sea squirts

Stolonica is a genus of ascidian tunicates in the family Styelidae.

Species within the genus Stolonica include:

- Stolonica agnata Kott, 1985
- Stolonica aluta Kott, 1985
- Stolonica australis Michaelsen, 1927
- Stolonica bigyna Monniot & Monniot, 2001
- Stolonica brevigastra Kott, 2003
- Stolonica carnosa Millar, 1963
- Stolonica conglutinata Sluiter, 1915
- Stolonica diptycha (Hartmeyer, 1919)
- Stolonica duploplicata Sluiter, 1913
- Stolonica inhacae (Millar, 1956)
- Stolonica laboutei (Monniot, 1988)
- Stolonica laevis Monniot, 2002
- Stolonica limbata Monniot & Monniot, 1996
- Stolonica malayanus (Sluiter, 1915)
- Stolonica michaelseni (Brewin, 1956)
- Stolonica multitestis Monniot, 2001
- Stolonica nodula (Kott, 1985)
- Stolonica paucigonas (Monniot & Monniot, 1984)
- Stolonica prolifera Sluiter, 1905
- Stolonica reducta (Sluiter, 1904)
- Stolonica sabulosa Monniot, 1972
- Stolonica schauinslandi (Michaelsen, 1922)
- Stolonica sigma Tokioka, 1952
- Stolonica socialis Hartmeyer, 1903
- Stolonica truncata Kott, 1972
- Stolonica variata Monniot, 1988
- Stolonica vermiculata Kott, 2005
- Stolonica vesicularis Van Name, 1918

Species names currently considered to be synonyms:

- Stolonica pacificus (Monniot & Monniot, 1991): synonym of Distomus pacificus Monniot & Monniot, 1991
- Stolonica styeliformis Van Name, 1918: synonym of Stolonica duploplicata Sluiter, 1913
- Stolonica variolosus (Gärtner in Pallas, 1774): synonym of Distomus variolosus Gaertner, 1774
- Stolonica zorritensis Van Name, 1931: synonym of Polyandrocarpa zorritensis (Van Name, 1931)
