= Botryllus elegans =

Scientific classification
- Kingdom: Animalia
- Phylum: Chordata
- Subphylum: Tunicata
- Class: Ascidiacea
- Order: Stolidobranchia
- Family: Styelidae
- Genus: Botryllus
- Species: B. elegans

Binomial name
- Botryllus elegans (Quoy & Gaimard, 1834)

Synonyms
- Chorizocarpa elegans (Quoy & Gaimard, 1834); Distomus elegans Quoy & Gaimard, 1834

Species of sea squirt

Botryllus elegans is a species of colonial ascidian tunicates in the family Styelidae. It is found in Mozambique and South Africa.
