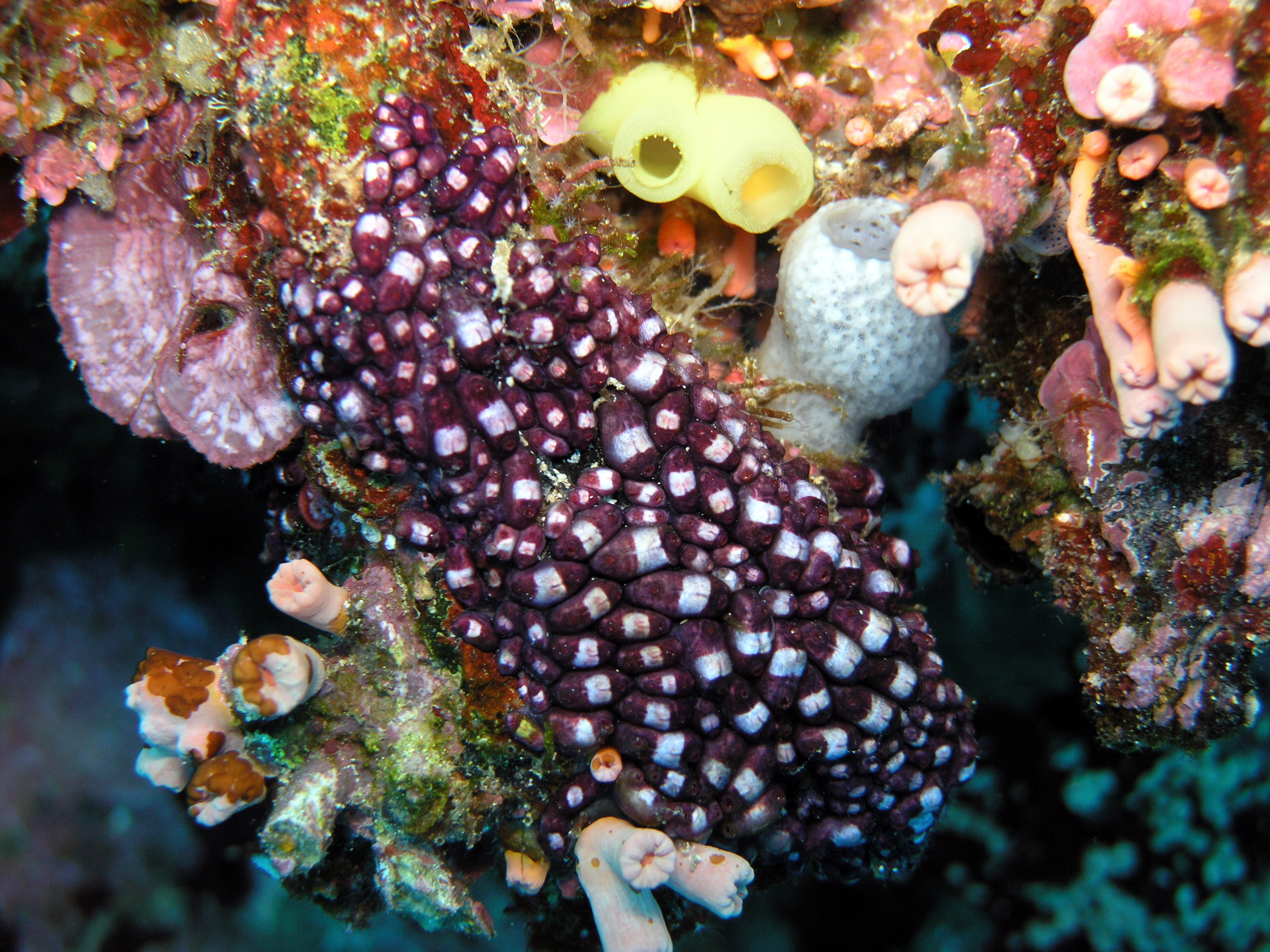

Scientific classification
- Domain: Eukaryota
- Kingdom: Animalia
- Phylum: Chordata
- Subphylum: Tunicata
- Class: Ascidiacea
- Order: Stolidobranchia
- Family: Styelidae
- Genus: Eusynstyela
- Species: E. misakiensis

Binomial name
- Eusynstyela misakiensis (Watanabe & Tokioka, 1972)

= Eusynstyela misakiensis =

Species of sea squirt

Eusynstyela misakiensis is a tunicate that is found in the western Pacific from Japan to Indonesia.
