= Culeolus elegans =

Scientific classification
- Domain: Eukaryota
- Kingdom: Animalia
- Phylum: Chordata
- Subphylum: Tunicata
- Class: Ascidiacea
- Order: Stolidobranchia
- Family: Pyuridae
- Genus: Culeolus
- Species: C. elegans

Binomial name
- Culeolus elegans Monniot & Monniot, 1991

Species of sea squirt

Culeolus elegans is a species of ascidian tunicates in the family Pyuridae. It is found in New Caledonia (Western South Pacific).
