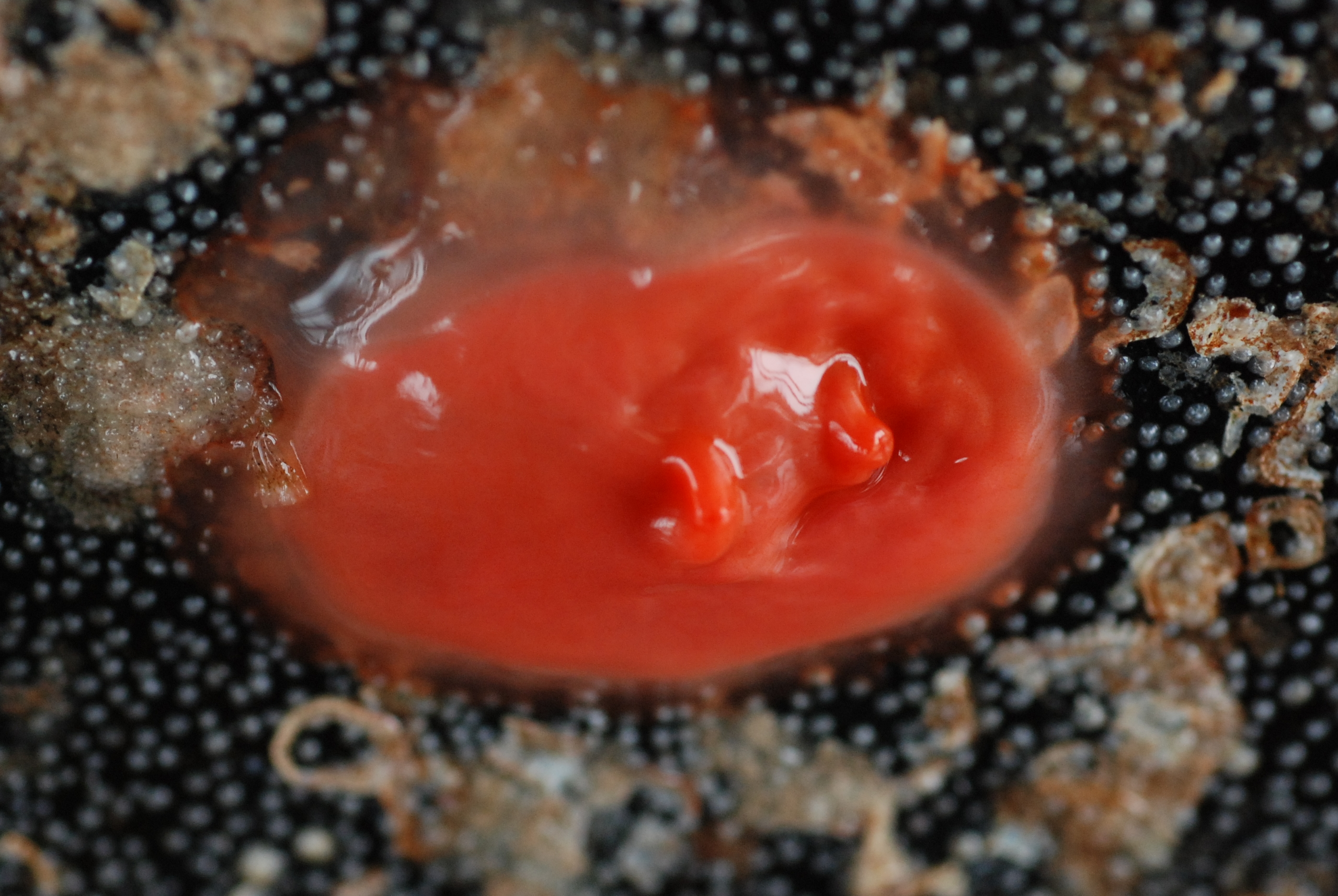
- Cnemidocarpa finmarkiensis

Scientific classification
- Kingdom: Animalia
- Phylum: Chordata
- Subphylum: Tunicata
- Class: Ascidiacea
- Order: Stolidobranchia
- Family: Styelidae
- Genus: Cnemidocarpa; Huntsman, 1913

Species
- See text

= Cnemidocarpa =

Genus of tunicates

Cnemidocarpa is a genus of ascidian tunicates in the family Styelidae.

Species within the genus Cnemidocarpa include:

- Cnemidocarpa acanthifera F. Monniot, 2011
- Cnemidocarpa aculeata Kott, 1985
- Cnemidocarpa alentura (Herdman, 1906)
- Cnemidocarpa alisi Monniot, 1992
- Cnemidocarpa amphora Kott, 1992
- Cnemidocarpa annectens (Hartmeyer, 1921)
- Cnemidocarpa areolata (Heller, 1878)
- Cnemidocarpa barbata Vinogradova, 1962
- Cnemidocarpa bathyphila Millar, 1955
- Cnemidocarpa bicornuta (Sluiter, 1900)
- Cnemidocarpa bifurcata Millar, 1964
- Cnemidocarpa bythia (Herdman, 1881)
- Cnemidocarpa calypso Monniot, 1970
- Cnemidocarpa campylogona Millar, 1988
- Cnemidocarpa cirrata Ärnbäck, 1922
- Cnemidocarpa clara (Hartmeyer, 1906)
- Cnemidocarpa clipeata (Ärnbäck, 1921)
- Cnemidocarpa completa Kott, 1985
- Cnemidocarpa concha Monniot, 2002
- Cnemidocarpa cornicula Monniot, 1978
- Cnemidocarpa devia Ärnbäck, 1931
- Cnemidocarpa digonas Monniot C. & Monniot F., 1968
- Cnemidocarpa drygalskii (Hartmeyer, 1911)
- Cnemidocarpa effracta Monniot, 1978
- Cnemidocarpa eposi Monniot & Monniot, 1994
- Cnemidocarpa fertilis (Hartmeyer, 1906)
- Cnemidocarpa finmarkiensis (Kiaer, 1893)
- Cnemidocarpa fissa Kott, 1985
- Cnemidocarpa floccosa (Sluiter, 1904)
- Cnemidocarpa hemprichi Hartmeyer, 1916
- Cnemidocarpa humilis (Heller, 1878)
- Cnemidocarpa incubita (Sluiter, 1904)
- Cnemidocarpa intestinata Kott, 1985
- Cnemidocarpa irene (Hartmeyer, 1906)
- Cnemidocarpa jacens Monniot & Monniot, 2003
- Cnemidocarpa javensis Millar, 1975
- Cnemidocarpa joannae (Herdman, 1898)
- Cnemidocarpa lapidosa (Herdman, 1906)
- Cnemidocarpa lobata (Kott, 1952)
- Cnemidocarpa longata (Kott, 1954)
- Cnemidocarpa margaritifera Michaelsen, 1919
- Cnemidocarpa minuta (Herdman, 1881)
- Cnemidocarpa miyadii Tokioka, 1949
- Cnemidocarpa mollis (Stimpson, 1852)
- Cnemidocarpa mollispina Ärnbäck, 1922
- Cnemidocarpa mortenseni (Hartmeyer, 1912)
- Cnemidocarpa nisiotis (Sluiter, 1900)
- Cnemidocarpa nordenskjöldi (Michaelsen, 1898)
- Cnemidocarpa novaezelandiae (Michaelsen, 1912)
- Cnemidocarpa ochotense Sanamyan, 1992
- Cnemidocarpa ohlini (Michaelsen, 1898)
- Cnemidocarpa oligocarpa (Sluiter, 1885)
- Cnemidocarpa otagoensis Brewin, 1952
- Cnemidocarpa pedata (Herdman, 1881)
- Cnemidocarpa personata (Herdman, 1899)
- Cnemidocarpa pfefferi (Michaelsen, 1898)
- Cnemidocarpa platybranchia Millar, 1955
- Cnemidocarpa posthuma Hartmeyer, 1927
- Cnemidocarpa psammophora Millar, 1962
- Cnemidocarpa quadrata (Herdman, 1881)
- Cnemidocarpa radicata (Millar, 1962)
- Cnemidocarpa radicosa (Herdman, 1882)
- Cnemidocarpa ramosa Nishikawa, 1991
- Cnemidocarpa recta Monniot, 1991
- Cnemidocarpa reticulata Millar, 1975
- Cnemidocarpa rhizopus (Redikorzev, 1907)
- Cnemidocarpa robinsoni Hartmeyer, 1916
- Cnemidocarpa sabulosa Glémarec & Monniot C., 1966
- Cnemidocarpa schumacheri Monniot, 2002
- Cnemidocarpa sedata (Sluiter, 1904)
- Cnemidocarpa sericata (Herdman, 1888)
- Cnemidocarpa serpentina (Sluiter, 1912)
- Cnemidocarpa squamata Lützen, 1970
- Cnemidocarpa stewartensis Michelsen, 1922
- Cnemidocarpa stolonifera (Herdman, 1899)
- Cnemidocarpa subpinguis (Herdman, 1923)
- Cnemidocarpa tenerispinosa Tokioka & Nishikawa, 1978
- Cnemidocarpa tinaktae (Van Name, 1918)
- Cnemidocarpa traustedti (Sluiter, 1890)
- Cnemidocarpa tribranchiata Kott, 1992
- Cnemidocarpa tripartita Kott, 1985
- Cnemidocarpa univesica F. Monniot, 2011
- Cnemidocarpa verrucosa (Lesson, 1830)
- Cnemidocarpa victoriae Monniot & Monniot, 1983
- Cnemidocarpa zenkevitchi Vinogradova, 1958

Species names currently considered to be synonyms:

- Cnemidocarpa acuelata Kott, 1985: synonym of Cnemidocarpa aculeata Kott, 1985
- Cnemidocarpa asymmetra (Hartmeyer, 1912): synonym of Asterocarpa humilis (Heller, 1878)
- Cnemidocarpa aucklandica Bovien, 1921: synonym of Asterocarpa humilis (Heller, 1878)
- Cnemidocarpa cerea (Sluiter, 1900): synonym of Asterocarpa humilis (Heller, 1878)
- Cnemidocarpa chinensis Tokioka, 1967: synonym of Polycarpa chinensis (Tokioka, 1967)
- Cnemidocarpa coerulea (Quoy & Gaimard, 1834): synonym of Asterocarpa coerulea (Quoy & Gaimard, 1834)
- Cnemidocarpa etheridgii (Herdman, 1899): synonym of Cnemidocarpa radicosa (Herdman, 1882)
- Cnemidocarpa gregaria (Kesteven, 1909): synonym of Asterocarpa humilis (Heller, 1878)
- Cnemidocarpa hartmeyeri Michaelsen, 1918: synonym of Eusynstyela hartmeyeri Michaelsen, 1904
- Cnemidocarpa hartogi Michaelsen, 1927: synonym of Cnemidocarpa irene (Hartmeyer, 1906)
- Cnemidocarpa heterotentaculata Beniaminson, 1971: synonym of Cnemidocarpa clara (Hartmeyer, 1906)
- Cnemidocarpa irma Hartmeyer, 1927: synonym of Cnemidocarpa irene (Hartmeyer, 1906)
- Cnemidocarpa legalli Gravier, 1955: synonym of Cnemidocarpa irene (Hartmeyer, 1906)
- Cnemidocarpa macrogastra (Oka, 1935): synonym of Cnemidocarpa clara (Hartmeyer, 1906)
- Cnemidocarpa madagascariensis Hartmeyer, 1916: synonym of Cnemidocarpa hemprichi Hartmeyer, 1916
- Cnemidocarpa masuii Tokioka, 1949: synonym of Cnemidocarpa miyadii Tokioka, 1949
- Cnemidocarpa monnioti Beniaminson, 1971: synonym of Cnemidocarpa clara (Hartmeyer, 1906)
- Cnemidocarpa peruviana Millar, 1970: synonym of Dicarpa pacifica Millar, 1964
- Cnemidocarpa polyphlebodes (Hartmeyer, 1919): synonym of Polycarpa aurita (Sluiter, 1890)
- Cnemidocarpa rectofissura Millar, 1982: synonym of Cnemidocarpa drygalskii (Hartmeyer, 1911)
- Cnemidocarpa regalis Michaelsen, 1922: synonym of Cnemidocarpa madagascariensis var. regalis Michaelsen, 1922
- Cnemidocarpa sabulifera (Ritter, 1913): synonym of Cnemidocarpa rhizopus (Redikorzev, 1907)
- Cnemidocarpa sericator Kott, 1971: synonym of Cnemidocarpa sericata (Herdman, 1888)
- Cnemidocarpa tinkatae (Van Name, 1918): synonym of Cnemidocarpa tinaktae (Van Name, 1918)
- Cnemidocarpa translucida Peres, 1951: synonym of Polycarpa translucida (Peres, 1951)
- Cnemidocarpa tricostata Millar, 1960: synonym of Dicarpa tricostata (Millar, 1960)
- Cnemidocarpa valborg Hartmeyer, 1919: synonym of Cnemidocarpa irene (Hartmeyer, 1906)
- Cnemidocarpa valborgi Hartmeyer, 1919: synonym of Cnemidocarpa irene (Hartmeyer, 1906)
- Cnemidocarpa vestita (Alder, 1860): synonym of Cnemidocarpa mollis (Stimpson, 1852)
