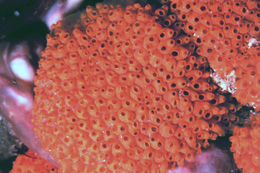
- Symplegma rubra

Scientific classification
- Kingdom: Animalia
- Phylum: Chordata
- Subphylum: Tunicata
- Class: Ascidiacea
- Order: Stolidobranchia
- Family: Styelidae
- Genus: Symplegma; Herdman, 1886

Species
- See text

= Symplegma =

Genus of sea squirts

Symplegma is a genus of ascidian tunicates in the family Styelidae.

Species within the genus Symplegma include:

- Symplegma alterna Monniot, 1988
- Symplegma arenosa Kott, 1972
- Symplegma bahraini Monniot & Monniot, 1997
- Symplegma brakenhielmi (Michaelsen, 1904)
- Symplegma connectens Tokioka, 1949
- Symplegma japonica Tokioka, 1962
- Symplegma reptans (Oka, 1927)
- Symplegma rubra Monniot, 1972
- Symplegma teruakii Kott, 2004
- Symplegma viride Herdman, 1886
- Symplegma zebra Monniot, 2002

Species names currently considered to be synonyms:

- Symplegma connectans Tokioka, 1949: synonym of Symplegma connectens Tokioka, 1949
- Symplegma elegans Michaelsen, 1934: synonym of Symplegma viride Herdman, 1886
- Symplegma oceania Tokioka, 1961: synonym of Symplegma brakenhielmi (Michaelsen, 1904)
- Symplegma okai (Redikorzev, 1916): synonym of Kukenthalia borealis (Gottschaldt, 1894)
- Symplegma stuhlmanni (Michaelsen, 1904): synonym of Symplegma brakenhielmi (Michaelsen, 1904)
- Symplegma systematica (Sluiter, 1904): synonym of Chorizocarpa sydneyensis (Herdman, 1891)
- Symplegma viridis : synonym of Symplegma viride Herdman, 1886
