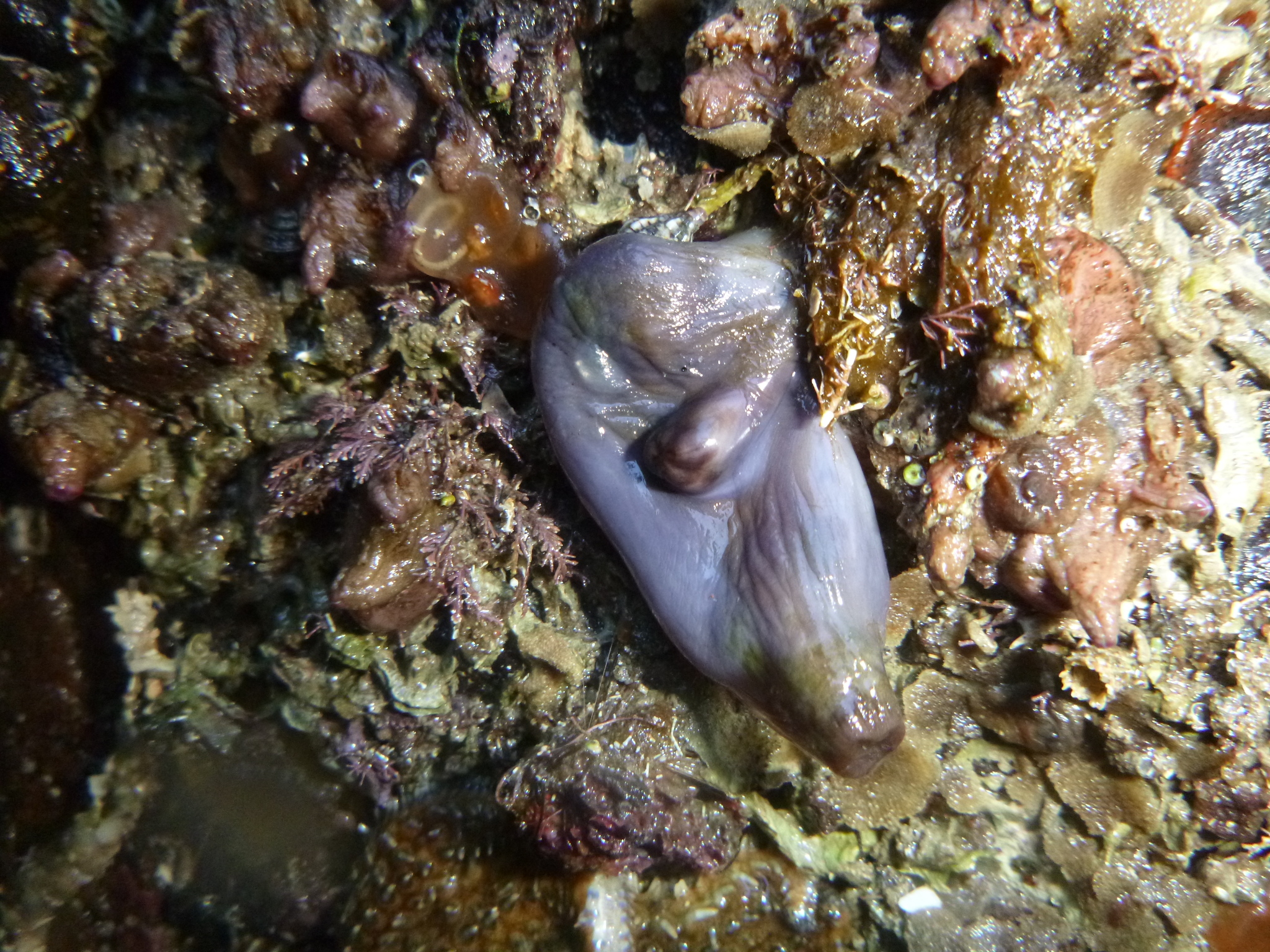
- Asterocarpa coerulea

Scientific classification
- Kingdom: Animalia
- Phylum: Chordata
- Subphylum: Tunicata
- Class: Ascidiacea
- Order: Stolidobranchia
- Family: Styelidae
- Genus: Asterocarpa; Brewin, 1946

Species
- See text

= Asterocarpa =

Genus of tunicates

Asterocarpa is a genus of ascidian tunicates in the family Styelidae.

Species within the genus Asterocarpa include:

- Asterocarpa coerulea (Quoy & Gaimard, 1834)
- Asterocarpa humilis (Heller, 1878)

Species names currently considered to be synonyms:

- Asterocarpa cerea (Sluiter, 1900): synonym of Asterocarpa humilis (Heller, 1878)
