= Heterostigma =

Heterostigma is the scientific name of several genera of organisms and may refer to:

- Heterostigma (plant), a genus of plants in the family Pandanaceae
- Heterostigma (tunicate), a genus of chordates in the family Pyuridae
