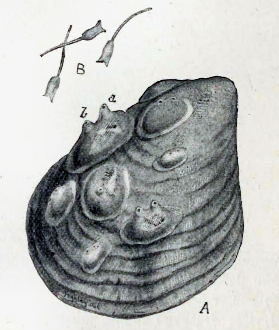
- Dendrodoa grossularia

Scientific classification
- Kingdom: Animalia
- Phylum: Chordata
- Subphylum: Tunicata
- Class: Ascidiacea
- Order: Stolidobranchia
- Family: Styelidae
- Genus: Dendrodoa; MacLeay, 1824

Species
- See text

= Dendrodoa =

Genus of sea squirts

Dendrodoa is a genus of ascidian tunicates in the family Styelidae.

== Species ==
Species within the genus Dendrodoa include:

- Dendrodoa abbotti Newberry, 1984
- Dendrodoa aggregata Müller, 1776
- Dendrodoa carnea (Rathke, 1806)
- Dendrodoa grossularia (Van Beneden, 1846)
- Dendrodoa lineata (Traustedt, 1880)
- Dendrodoa minuta (Bonnevie, 1896)
- Dendrodoa pulchella (Rathke, 1806)
- Dendrodoa uniplicata (Bonnevie, 1896)

=== Former species ===
Species names currently considered to be synonyms:

- Dendrodoa adolphi (Kupffer, 1874): synonym of Dendrodoa pulchella (Rathke, 1806)
- Dendrodoa annectens Hartmeyer, 1921: synonym of Cnemidocarpa annectens (Hartmeyer, 1921)
- Dendrodoa cylindrica Bjerkan, 1908: synonym of Dendrodoa aggregata Müller, 1776
- Dendrodoa glandaria MacLeay, 1825: synonym of Dendrodoa aggregata Müller, 1776
- Dendrodoa gregaria Kesteven, 1909: synonym of Asterocarpa humilis (Heller, 1878)
- Dendrodoa kuekenthali Hartmeyer, 1899: synonym of Dendrodoa pulchella (Rathke, 1806)
- Dendrodoa kukenthali Hartmeyer, 1899: synonym of Dendrodoa pulchella (Rathke, 1806)
- Dendrodoa microstigma Redikorzev, 1916: synonym of Dendrodoa lineata (Traustedt, 1880)
- Dendrodoa subpedunculata Ritter, 1899: synonym of Dendrodoa aggregata Müller, 1776
- Dendrodoa tuberculata Ritter, 1899: synonym of Dendrodoa aggregata Müller, 1776
