= Alloeocarpa =

Scientific classification
- Kingdom: Animalia
- Phylum: Chordata
- Subphylum: Tunicata
- Class: Ascidiacea
- Order: Stolidobranchia
- Family: Styelidae
- Genus: Alloeocarpa; Michaelsen, 1900

Species
- See text

Genus of sea squirts

Alloeocarpa is a genus of ascidian tunicates in the family Styelidae.

== Species ==
Species within the genus Alloeocarpa include:

- Alloeocarpa aequatorialis Millar, 1953
- Alloeocarpa affinis Bovien, 1921
- Alloeocarpa bacca Ärnbäck, 1929
- Alloeocarpa bigyna Monniot, 1978
- Alloeocarpa bridgesi Michaelsen, 1900
- Alloeocarpa capensis Hartmeyer, 1912
- Alloeocarpa incrustans (Herdman, 1886)
- Alloeocarpa loculosa C. Monniot, 1974
- Alloeocarpa minuta Brewin, 1951

Species names currently considered to be synonyms:

- Alloeocarpa emilionis Michaelsen, 1900: synonym of Alloeocarpa incrustans (Herdman, 1886)
- Alloeocarpa hupferi Michaelsen, 1904: synonym of Distomus hupferi (Michaelsen, 1904)
- Alloeocarpa intermedia Michaelsen, 1900: synonym of Alloeocarpa incrustans (Herdman, 1886)
- Alloeocarpa rudentiformis Sluiter, 1915: synonym of Distomus rudentiformis (Sluiter, 1915)
- Alloeocarpa similis (Sluiter, 1904): synonym of Symplegma brakenhielmi (Michaelsen, 1904)
- Alloeocarpa zschaui Michaelsen, 1900: synonym of Alloeocarpa incrustans (Herdman, 1886)
