= Gynandrocarpa =

Scientific classification
- Kingdom: Animalia
- Phylum: Chordata
- Subphylum: Tunicata
- Class: Ascidiacea
- Order: Stolidobranchia
- Family: Styelidae
- Genus: Gynandrocarpa; Michaelsen, 1900
- Species: G. placenta

Binomial name
- Gynandrocarpa placenta (Herdman, 1886)

Genus of sea squirts

Gynandrocarpa is a genus of ascidian tunicates in the family Styelidae.

Species within the genus Gynandrocarpa include:

- Gynandrocarpa placenta (Herdman, 1886)

Species names currently considered to be synonyms:

- Gynandrocarpa borealis (Gottschaldt, 1894): synonym of Kukenthalia borealis (Gottschaldt, 1894)
- Gynandrocarpa domuncula Michaelsen, 1904: synonym of Polyandrocarpa placenta (Herdman, 1886)
- Gynandrocarpa imthurni Herdman, 1906: synonym of Eusynstyela latericius (Sluiter, 1904)
- Gynandrocarpa latericius Sluiter, 1904: synonym of Eusynstyela latericius (Sluiter, 1904)
- Gynandrocarpa maxima Sluiter, 1904: synonym of Polycarpa anguinea (Sluiter, 1898)
- Gynandrocarpa michaelseni (Sluiter, 1900): synonym of Chorizocarpa michaelseni (Sluiter, 1900)
- Gynandrocarpa misanthropos Monniot, 1978: synonym of Dextrocarpa misanthropos Monniot, 1978
- Gynandrocarpa nigricans (Heller, 1878): synonym of Polycarpa nigricans Heller, 1878
- Gynandrocarpa purpurea Sluiter, 1904: synonym of Chorizocarpa sydneyensis (Herdman, 1891)
- Gynandrocarpa quadricornulis Sluiter, 1904: synonym of Symplegma brakenhielmi (Michaelsen, 1904)
- Gynandrocarpa similis Sluiter, 1904: synonym of Symplegma brakenhielmi (Michaelsen, 1904)
- Gynandrocarpa solitaris Millar, 1955: synonym of Dextrocarpa solitaris Millar, 1955
- Gynandrocarpa systematica Sluiter, 1904: synonym of Chorizocarpa sydneyensis (Herdman, 1891)
- Gynandrocarpa unilateralis Michaelsen, 1900: synonym of Gynandrocarpa placenta (Herdman, 1886)
