= Syncarpa =

Scientific classification
- Kingdom: Animalia
- Phylum: Chordata
- Subphylum: Tunicata
- Class: Ascidiacea
- Order: Stolidobranchia
- Family: Styelidae
- Genus: Syncarpa; Redikorzev, 1913

Species
- See text

Genus of sea squirts

Syncarpa is a genus of ascidian tunicates in the family Styelidae.

Species within the genus Syncarpa include:

- Syncarpa corticiformis Beniaminson, 1975
- Syncarpa oviformis Redikorzev, 1913
