= Arnbackia =

Scientific classification
- Kingdom: Animalia
- Phylum: Chordata
- Subphylum: Tunicata
- Class: Ascidiacea
- Order: Stolidobranchia
- Family: Styelidae
- Genus: Arnbackia; Brewin, 1950
- Species: A. novaezelandiae

Binomial name
- Arnbackia novaezelandiae Brewin, 1950

Genus of Ascidiacea

Arnbackia is a genus of ascidian tunicates in the family Styelidae. The only species is Arnbackia novaezelandiae.
