= Oculinaria =

Scientific classification
- Kingdom: Animalia
- Phylum: Chordata
- Subphylum: Tunicata
- Class: Ascidiacea
- Order: Stolidobranchia
- Family: Styelidae
- Genus: Oculinaria; Gray, 1868

Species
- See text

Genus of sea squirts

Oculinaria is a genus of ascidian tunicates in the family Styelidae.

Species within the genus Oculinaria include:

- Oculinaria australis Gray, 1868
- Oculinaria occultare Monniot, 1991
