= Monandrocarpa =

Scientific classification
- Kingdom: Animalia
- Phylum: Chordata
- Subphylum: Tunicata
- Class: Ascidiacea
- Order: Stolidobranchia
- Family: Styelidae
- Genus: Monandrocarpa; Michaelsen, 1904

Species
- See text

Genus of sea squirts

Monandrocarpa is a genus of ascidian tunicates in the family Styelidae.

Species within the genus Monandrocarpa include:

- Monandrocarpa abyssa Sanamyan & Sanamyan, 1999
- Monandrocarpa humilis F. Monniot, 2009
- Monandrocarpa incubita (Sluiter, 1904)
- Monandrocarpa monotestis (Tokioka, 1953)
- Monandrocarpa plana (Kott, 1972)
- Monandrocarpa simplicigona (Millar, 1975)
- Monandrocarpa stolonifera Monniot, 1970
- Monandrocarpa tarona C. & F. Monniot, 1987
- Monandrocarpa tritonis Michaelsen, 1904
