= Theodorella =

Scientific classification
- Kingdom: Animalia
- Phylum: Chordata
- Subphylum: Tunicata
- Class: Ascidiacea
- Order: Stolidobranchia
- Family: Styelidae
- Genus: Theodorella; Michaelsen, 1922

Species
- See text

Genus of sea squirts

Theodorella is a genus of ascidian tunicates in the family Styelidae.

Species within the genus Theodorella include:

- Theodorella arenosa Michaelsen, 1922
- Theodorella stewartensis Michaelsen, 1922
- Theodorella torus Michaelsen, 1922
