= Psammostyela =

Scientific classification
- Kingdom: Animalia
- Phylum: Chordata
- Subphylum: Tunicata
- Class: Ascidiacea
- Order: Stolidobranchia
- Family: Styelidae
- Genus: Psammostyela; Weinstein, 1961
- Species: P. delamarei

Binomial name
- Psammostyela delamarei Weinstein, 1961

Genus of sea squirts

Psammostyela is a genus of ascidian tunicates in the family Styelidae. The genus is monotypic; the only species is Psammostyela delamarei.
