= Bathystyeloides =

Scientific classification
- Kingdom: Animalia
- Phylum: Chordata
- Subphylum: Tunicata
- Class: Ascidiacea
- Order: Stolidobranchia
- Family: Styelidae
- Genus: Bathystyeloides; Seeliger, 1907

Species
- See text

Genus of sea squirts

Bathystyeloides is a genus of ascidian tunicates in the family Styelidae.

Species within the genus Bathystyeloides include:

- Bathystyeloides anfractus Monniot & Monniot, 1985
- Bathystyeloides dubius C. & F. Monniot, 1984
- Bathystyeloides enderbyanus (Michaelsen, 1904)
- Bathystyeloides laubieri Monniot C. & Monniot F., 1974
- Bathystyeloides magnus Sanamyan & Sanamyan, 1999
- Bathystyeloides mexicanus Monniot & Monniot, 1987
- Bathystyeloides miriducta Monniot & Monniot, 1991

Species names currently considered to be synonyms:

- Bathystyeloides atlantica Millar, 1955: synonym of Bathystyeloides enderbyanus (Michaelsen, 1904)
