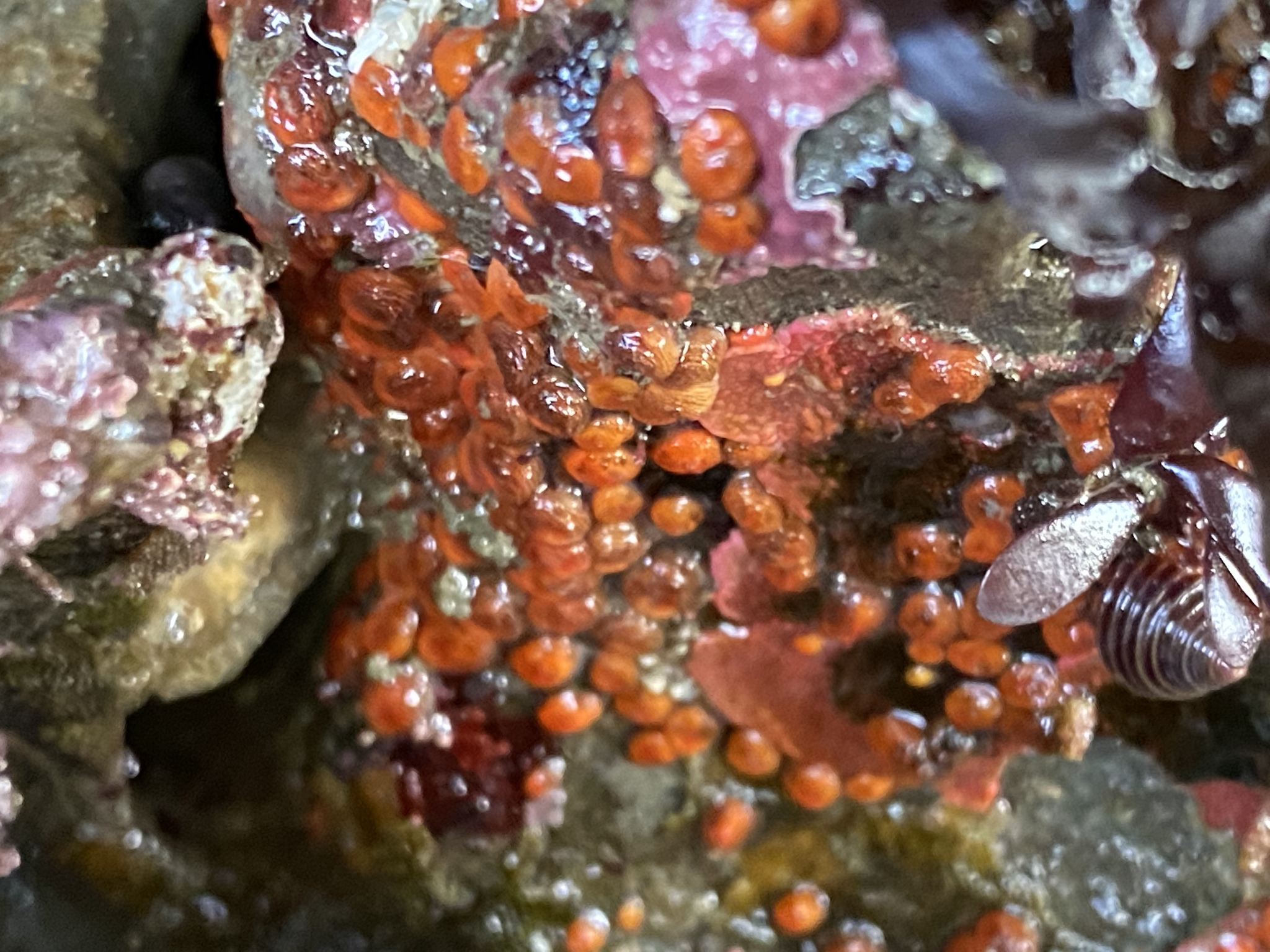
- Metandrocarpa taylori

Scientific classification
- Kingdom: Animalia
- Phylum: Chordata
- Subphylum: Tunicata
- Class: Ascidiacea
- Order: Stolidobranchia
- Family: Styelidae
- Genus: Metandrocarpa; Michaelsen, 1904

Species
- See text

= Metandrocarpa =

Genus of sea squirts

Metandrocarpa is a genus of ascidian tunicates in the family Styelidae.

Species within the genus Metandrocarpa include:

- Metandrocarpa agitata Kott, 1985
- Metandrocarpa asymmetra Monniot C., 2001
- Metandrocarpa dura (Ritter, 1896)
- Metandrocarpa fascicularis Millar, 1962
- Metandrocarpa indica Kott, 1972
- Metandrocarpa kudoi Rho & Cole, 1999
- Metandrocarpa manina Monniot & Monniot, 1987
- Metandrocarpa michaelseni Ritter & Forsyth, 1917
- Metandrocarpa miniscula Kott, 1985
- Metandrocarpa protostigmatica Michaelsen, 1922
- Metandrocarpa reducta Monniot, 1988
- Metandrocarpa sterreri Monniot, 1972
- Metandrocarpa taylori Huntsman, 1912
- Metandrocarpa thilenii Michaelsen, 1922
- Metandrocarpa uedai Watanabe & Tokioka, 1972

Species names currently considered to be synonyms:

- Metandrocarpa dermatina Huntsman, 1912: synonym of Metandrocarpa dura (Ritter, 1896)
- Metandrocarpa protostigmata Michaelsen, 1922: synonym of Metandrocarpa protostigmatica Michaelsen, 1922
- Metandrocarpa tritonis (Michaelsen, 1904): synonym of Monandrocarpa tritonis Michaelsen, 1904
