= Pelonaia =

Scientific classification
- Kingdom: Animalia
- Phylum: Chordata
- Subphylum: Tunicata
- Class: Ascidiacea
- Order: Stolidobranchia
- Family: Styelidae
- Genus: Pelonaia; Forbes & Goodsir, 1841

Species
- See text

Genus of sea squirts

Pelonaia is a genus of ascidian tunicates in the family Styelidae.

Species within the genus Pelonaia include:

- Pelonaia corrugata Goodsir & Forbes, 1841
- Pelonaia quadrivena Monniot, 2011

Species names currently considered to be synonyms:

- Pelonaia arenifera Stimpson, 1851: synonym of Pelonaia corrugata Goodsir & Forbes, 1841
- Pelonaia glabra Forbes & Goodsir, 1841: synonym of Pelonaia corrugata Goodsir & Forbes, 1841
- Pelonaia villosa Sars, 1859: synonym of Pelonaia corrugata Goodsir & Forbes, 1841
