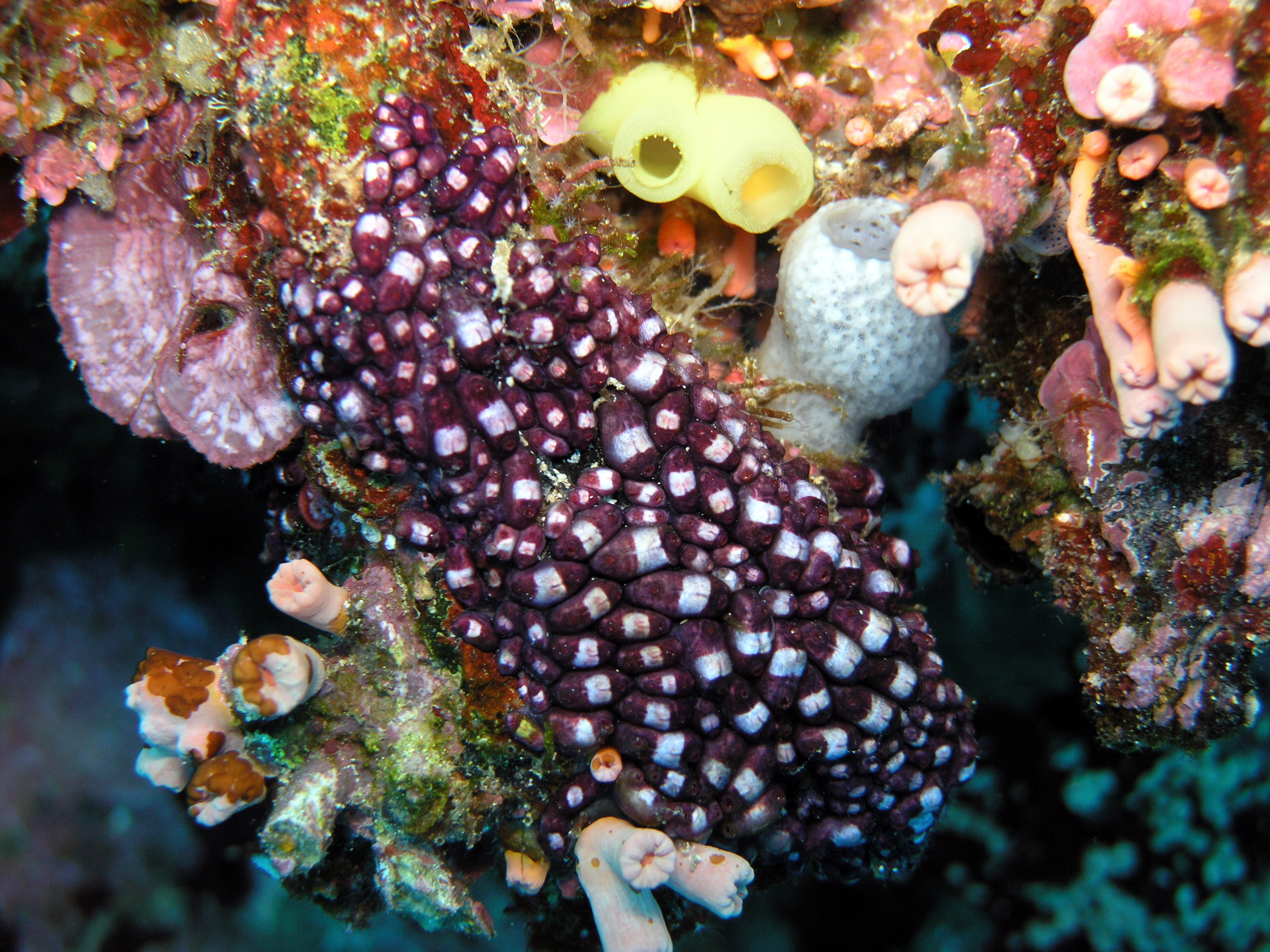
- Eusynstyela misakiensis

Scientific classification
- Kingdom: Animalia
- Phylum: Chordata
- Subphylum: Tunicata
- Class: Ascidiacea
- Order: Stolidobranchia
- Family: Styelidae
- Genus: Eusynstyela; Michaelsen, 1904

Species
- See text

= Eusynstyela =

Genus of sea squirts

Eusynstyela is a genus of ascidian tunicates in the family Styelidae.

== Species ==
Species within the genus Eusynstyela include:

- Eusynstyela beuziti (Monniot C., 1970)
- Eusynstyela floridana (Van Name, 1921)
- Eusynstyela grandis Kott, 1990
- Eusynstyela gravei (Van Name, 1931)
- Eusynstyela hartmeyeri Michaelsen, 1904
- Eusynstyela latericius (Sluiter, 1904)
- Eusynstyela miniata (Sluiter, 1905)
- Eusynstyela misakiensis (Watanabe & Tokioka, 1972)
- Eusynstyela monotestis (Tokioka, 1953)
- Eusynstyela ordinata (Monniot, 1983)
- Eusynstyela phiala Monniot, 1991
- Eusynstyela tincta (Van Name, 1902)

Species names currently considered to be synonyms:

- Eusynstyela aliena Monniot, 1991: synonym of Eusynstyela hartmeyeri Michaelsen, 1904
- Eusynstyela caudata Monniot & Monniot, 1975: synonym of Polycarpa caudata Monniot C. & Monniot F., 1974
- Eusynstyela discoidea Heller, 1877: synonym of Polycarpa discoidea Heller, 1877
- Eusynstyela errans Hartmeyer, 1909-1911: synonym of Polycarpa errans Hartmeyer, 1909
- Eusynstyela imthurni (Herdman, 1906): synonym of Eusynstyela latericius (Sluiter, 1904)
- Eusynstyela transversalis (Tokioka, 1963): synonym of Tibitin transversalis (Tokioka, 1963)
