= Bolteniopsis =

Scientific classification
- Kingdom: Animalia
- Phylum: Chordata
- Subphylum: Tunicata
- Class: Ascidiacea
- Order: Stolidobranchia
- Family: Pyuridae
- Genus: Bolteniopsis; Harant, 1927

Species
- See text

Genus of sea squirts

Bolteniopsis is a genus of ascidian tunicates in the family Pyuridae.

Species within the genus Bolteniopsis include:

- Bolteniopsis pacificus Monniot, 1989
- Bolteniopsis perlucidus Monniot & Monniot, 1985
- Bolteniopsis prenanti Harant, 1927
- Bolteniopsis sessilis Monniot C. & Monniot F., 1970
