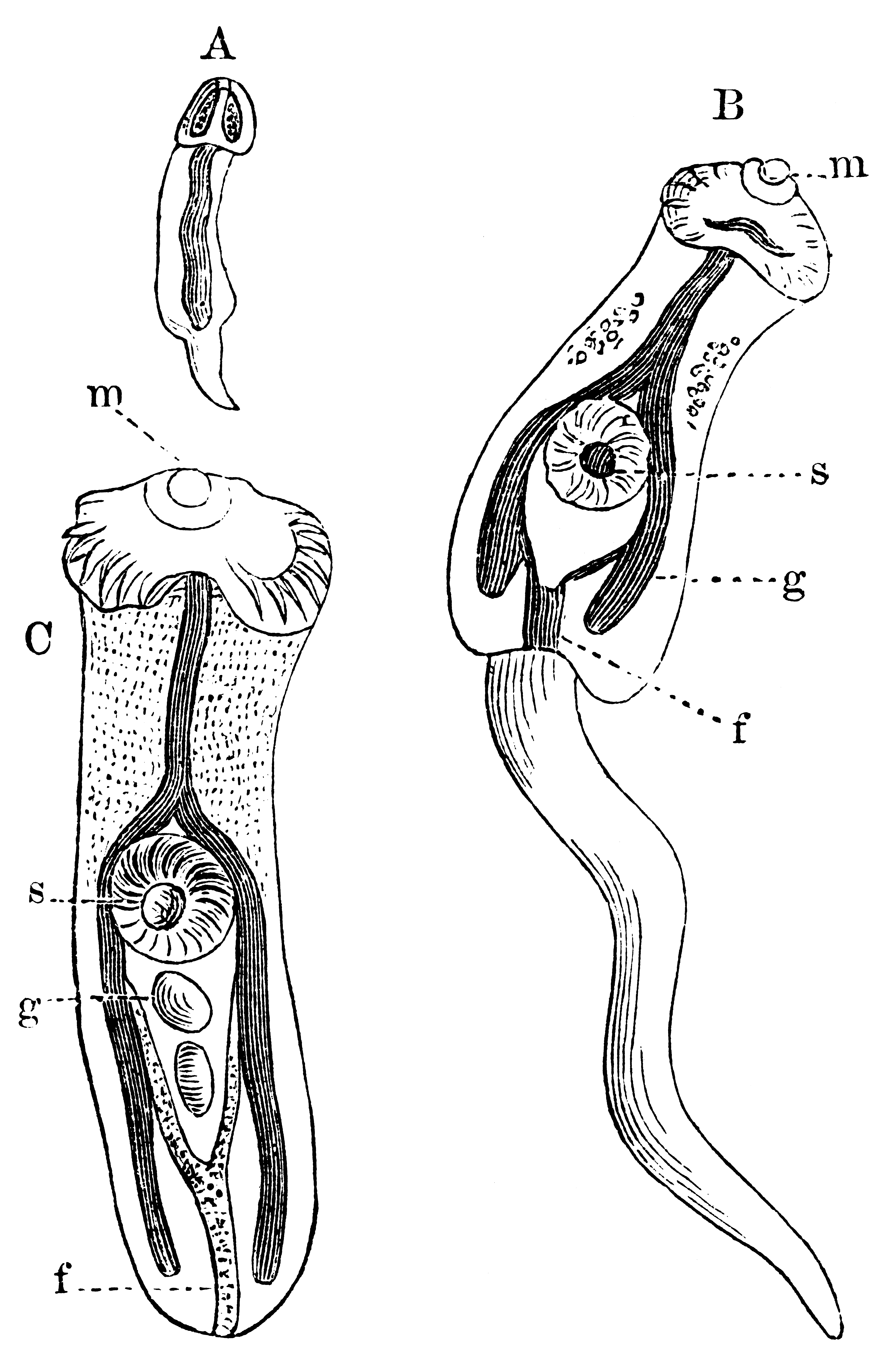
- Distomus

Scientific classification
- Kingdom: Animalia
- Phylum: Chordata
- Subphylum: Tunicata
- Class: Ascidiacea
- Order: Stolidobranchia
- Family: Styelidae
- Genus: Distomus; Gaertner, 1774

Species
- See text

= Distomus =

Genus of sea squirts

Distomus is a genus of ascidian tunicates in the family Styelidae.

Species within the genus Distomus include:

- Distomus antiborealis Monniot, Monniot, Griffiths & Schleyer, 2001
- Distomus fuscus Delle Chiaje, 1841
- Distomus hupferi (Michaelsen, 1904)
- Distomus malayensis Sluiter, 1919
- Distomus pacificus Monniot & Monniot, 1991
- Distomus rudentiformis (Sluiter, 1915)
- Distomus variolosus Gaertner, 1774

Species names currently considered to be synonyms:

- Distomus crystallinus (Renier, 1804): synonym of Polycitor crystallinus (Renier, 1804)
- Distomus diptychos Hartmeyer, 1919: synonym of Stolonica diptycha (Hartmeyer, 1919)
- Distomus elegans Quoy & Gaimard, 1834: synonym of Botryllus elegans (Quoy & Gaimard, 1834)
- Distomus kukenthali (Gottschaldt, 1894): synonym of Eudistoma vitreum (Sars, 1851)
- Distomus mamillaris Gaertner, 1774: synonym of Polycarpa mamillaris (Gaertner, 1774)
- Distomus vitreum : synonym of Eudistoma vitreum (Sars, 1851)
