= Ctenyura =

Scientific classification
- Kingdom: Animalia
- Phylum: Chordata
- Subphylum: Tunicata
- Class: Ascidiacea
- Order: Stolidobranchia
- Family: Pyuridae
- Genus: Ctenyura; Van Name, 1918

Species
- See text

Genus of sea squirts

Ctenyura is a genus of ascidian tunicates in the family Pyuridae.

Species within the genus Ctenyura include:

- Ctenyura comma (Hartmeyer, 1906)
- Ctenyura intermedia Van Name, 1918
- Ctenyura tetraplexa Kott, 1985
- Ctenyura tortuosa Kott, 1985
