= Oligocarpa =

Scientific classification
- Kingdom: Animalia
- Phylum: Chordata
- Subphylum: Tunicata
- Class: Ascidiacea
- Order: Stolidobranchia
- Family: Styelidae
- Genus: Oligocarpa; Hartmeyer, 1911

Species
- See text

Genus of sea squirts

Oligocarpa is a genus of ascidian tunicates in the family Styelidae.

Species within the genus Oligocarpa include:

- Oligocarpa megalorchis Hartmeyer, 1911
- Oligocarpa skoogi Michaelsen, 1923
