= Bathypyura =

Scientific classification
- Kingdom: Animalia
- Phylum: Chordata
- Subphylum: Tunicata
- Class: Ascidiacea
- Order: Stolidobranchia
- Family: Pyuridae
- Genus: Bathypyura; Monniot & Monniot, 1973

Species
- See text

Genus of sea squirts

Bathypyura is a genus of ascidian tunicates in the family Pyuridae.

Species within the genus Bathypyura include:

- Bathypyura asymetrica Monniot, 1971
- Bathypyura celata Monniot C. & Monniot F., 1973
