= Claudenus =

Scientific classification
- Kingdom: Animalia
- Phylum: Chordata
- Subphylum: Tunicata
- Class: Ascidiacea
- Order: Stolidobranchia
- Family: Pyuridae
- Genus: Claudenus; Kott, 1998

Species
- See text

Genus of sea squirts

Claudenus is a genus of ascidian tunicates in the family Pyuridae.

Species within the genus Claudenus include:

- Claudenus antipodus (Kott, 1972)

Species names currently considered to be synonyms:

- Claudenus antipoda (Kott, 1972): synonym of Claudenus antipodus (Kott, 1972)
- Claudenus appendiculata (Heller, 1877): synonym of Molgula appendiculata Heller, 1877
