= Dicarpa =

Scientific classification
- Kingdom: Animalia
- Phylum: Chordata
- Subphylum: Tunicata
- Class: Ascidiacea
- Order: Stolidobranchia
- Family: Styelidae
- Genus: Dicarpa; Millar, 1955

Species
- See text

Genus of sea squirts

Dicarpa is a genus of ascidian tunicates in the family Styelidae.

== Species ==
Species within the genus Dicarpa include:

- Dicarpa antarctica Monniot & Monniot, 1977
- Dicarpa atlantica Millar, 1964
- Dicarpa cornicula (Monniot, 1978)
- Dicarpa fibrata Monniot, 1997
- Dicarpa insinuosa (Sluiter, 1912)
- Dicarpa intritae Monniot & Monniot, 1976
- Dicarpa lata Monniot & Monniot, 1976
- Dicarpa mysogyna Monniot & Monniot, 1982
- Dicarpa pacifica Millar, 1964
- Dicarpa simplex Millar, 1955
- Dicarpa spinifera Monniot & Monniot, 1976
- Dicarpa tricostata (Millar, 1960)

Species names currently considered to be synonyms:

- Dicarpa mysogyna Monniot & Monniot, 1983: synonym of Dicarpa mysogyna Monniot & Monniot, 1982
