= Bathyoncus =

Scientific classification
- Kingdom: Animalia
- Phylum: Chordata
- Subphylum: Tunicata
- Class: Ascidiacea
- Order: Stolidobranchia
- Family: Styelidae
- Genus: Bathyoncus; Herdman, 1882

Species
- See text

Genus of sea squirts

Bathyoncus is a genus of ascidian tunicates in the family Styelidae.

Species within the genus Bathyoncus include:

- Bathyoncus arafurensis Monniot & Monniot, 2003
- Bathyoncus herdmani Michaelsen, 1904
- Bathyoncus lanatus Monniot & Monniot, 1991
- Bathyoncus mirabilis Herdman, 1882
- Bathyoncus tantulus Monniot & Monniot, 1991

Species names currently considered to be synonyms:

- Bathyoncus enderbyanus Michaelsen, 1904: synonym of Bathystyeloides enderbyanus (Michaelsen, 1904)
