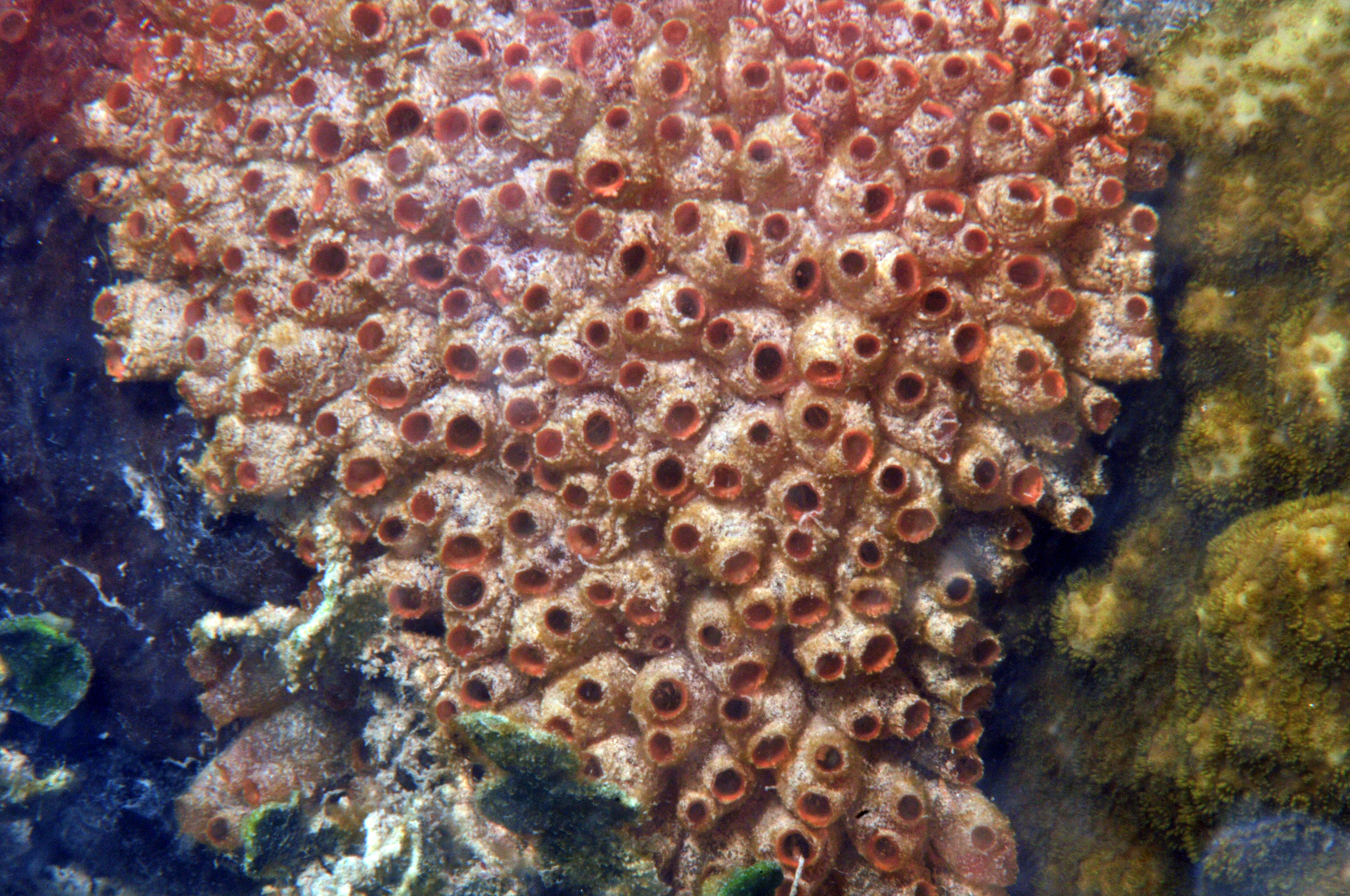
- Polyandrocarpa anguinea

Scientific classification
- Kingdom: Animalia
- Phylum: Chordata
- Subphylum: Tunicata
- Class: Ascidiacea
- Order: Stolidobranchia
- Family: Styelidae
- Genus: Polyandrocarpa; Michaelsen, 1904

Species
- See text

= Polyandrocarpa =

Genus of sea squirts

Polyandrocarpa is a genus of ascidian tunicates in the family Styelidae.

== Description ==
Species of the genus Polyandrocarpa are invertebrates, and their bodies are surrounded by a tunic resembling cartilage, composed of proteins, carbohydrates, and tunicin, with thickness ranging from thin and delicate to transparent and gelatinous. They are primarily sessile species that filter-feed and reproduce by budding. As members of the order Stolidobranchia they have folded pharyngeal baskets.

Characteristics include bilateral symmetry, colonial organization, a soft-bodied skeletal structure, and may possibly include an ocelli visual system. Species are filter feeders in marine benthic and shallow environments.

== Species ==
Species within the genus Polyandrocarpa include:

- Polyandrocarpa abjornseni Michaelsen, 1927 has two, long-oval gonads on each side of the body, each with six pairs of male follicles, differing from most congeners that have short, numerous polycarp-type gonads.
- Polyandrocarpa anguinea Sluiter, 1898 - has a known distribution of the southeastern United States (Florida), Panama, Martinique, southeastern Brazil, Sierra Leone, South Africa, Mauritius, Indonesia, Philippines, Australia, and New Caledonia.
- Polyandrocarpa arianae Monniot F., 2016 - has a polycarpid gonad.
- Polyandrocarpa aurorae Monniot F., 2018
- Polyandrocarpa australiensis Kott, 1952
- Polyandrocarpa chendurensis Renganathan & Krishnaswamy, 1985
- Polyandrocarpa colemani Kott, 1992 - has a large colony of zooids and a thick layer of muscles within the body wall.
- Polyandrocarpa colligata Sluiter, 1913
- Polyandrocarpa durbanensis Millar, 1955
- Polyandrocarpa glandulosa Monniot C., 1987
- Polyandrocarpa gravei Van Name, 1931
- Polyandrocarpa griffithsi Monniot C., Monniot F., Griffiths & Schleyer, 2001
- Polyandrocarpa lapidosa Herdman, 1891
- Polyandrocarpa misakiensis Watanabe & Tokioka, 1972
- Polyandrocarpa oligocarpa Millar, 1970
- Polyandrocarpa ordinata Monniot C., 1983
- Polyandrocarpa pilella Herdman, 1881
- Polyandrocarpa placenta Herdman, 1886
- Polyandrocarpa polypora Monniot F. & Monniot C., 2001
- Polyandrocarpa robusta Sluiter, 1919
- Polyandrocarpa rollandi Tokioka, 1961
- Polyandrocarpa shimodensis Brunetti, 2007
- Polyandrocarpa simulans Kott, 1972
- Polyandrocarpa sparsa Kott, 1985
- Polyandrocarpa triggiensis Kott, 1952
- Polyandrocarpa watsonia Kott, 1985
- Polyandrocarpa zorritensis Van Name, 1931 - known distribution of Japan, Guam, and Hawaii, with a probable geographical origin of the Western Pacific region. It is a colonial species with an asexual life cycle.

== Distribution and habitat ==
Species of the genus Polyandrocarpa are found in marine environments globally. They have been reported in various regions, including the coasts of North America, South America, Europe, Africa, Asia, Australia, and in the Atlantic, Pacific, and Indian Oceans. Different species can range from shallow environments to benthic environments. For example, Polyandrocarpa zorritensis is a shallow water species, whereas Polyandrocarpa arianae have been found deeper than 90 meters in the Mediterranean Sea.

Some species of the genus Polyandrocarpa are invasive in certain regions. For example, Polyandrocarpa zorritensis is native to the Atlantic Ocean but is considered a threat to certain marine species in the Mediterranean Sea.

Habitats of species of the genus Polyandrocarpa include coral reefs, estuaries, rocky or other hard surfaces, and marine benthic environments. Species attach to surfaces using an adhesive secretion. Species of the genus play an important role in marine ecosystems as filter feeders, helping to remove small particles and pollutants from the water.

== Diet ==
Species of the genus Polyandrocarpa feed on small particles and plankton.

== Life history ==
Polyandrocarpa are characterized by their small size and simple body structure. They typically form small, spherical colonies that consist of multiple individuals, or zooids, connected together.

Polyandrocarpa form colonies composed of multiple individuals.

Polyandrocarpa can have colonies with embedded zooids or separate zooids joined by basal stolons, though the majority of species within this genus do not have completely embedded zooids. Each zooid has a sac-like body with two siphons: an inhalant siphon that draws in water and food particles, and an exhalant siphon that expels waste and water back into the surrounding environment. An exception to this is Polyandrocarpa colligata. P. colligata has completely embedded zooids and an encrusting colony.

Tunicates can reproduce both sexually and asexually. Polyandrocarpa zorritensis have the ability to reproduce via non-embryonic development (NED), i.e., asexual budding. Polyandrocarpa are capable of regenerating body parts.

Some Polyandrocarpa species have adapted to high-flow environments and are tolerant to temperature and salinity changes.

== Uses by humans ==
Some species of Polyandrocarpa are also used in biomedical research due to their ability to regenerate body parts, which may have implications for human tissue engineering and organ transplantations in the future.
