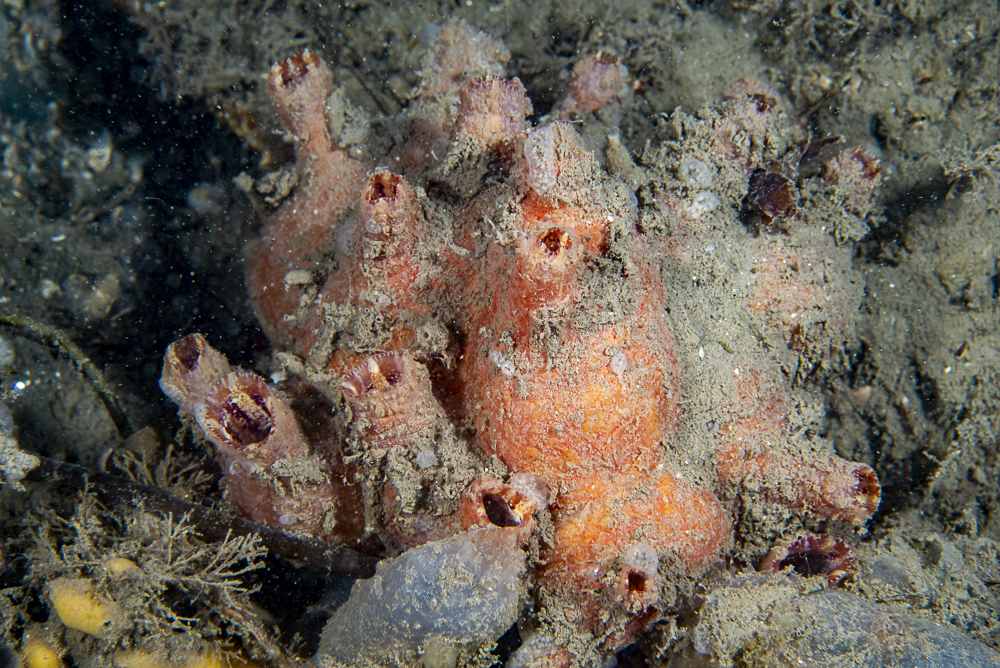

Scientific classification
- Domain: Eukaryota
- Kingdom: Animalia
- Phylum: Chordata
- Subphylum: Tunicata
- Class: Ascidiacea
- Order: Stolidobranchia
- Family: Styelidae
- Genus: Asterocarpa
- Species: A. humilis

Binomial name
- Asterocarpa humilis (Heller, 1878)

Synonyms
- Asterocarpa cerea (Sluiter, 1900); Cnemidocarpa asymmetra (Hartmeyer, 1912; Cnemidocarpa aucklandica Bovien, 1921; Cnemidocarpa cerea (Sluiter, 1900); Cnemidocarpa gregaria (Kesteven, 1909); Cnemidocarpa humilis (Heller, 1878); Cnemidocarpa robinsoni Hartmeyer, 1916; Dendrodoa gregaria Kesteven, 1909; Pandocia gregaria (Kesteven, 1909); Styela asymmetra (Hartmeyer, 1912); Styela cerea Sluiter, 1900; Styela humilis Heller, 1878; Tethyum asymmetron Hartmeyer, 1912

= Asterocarpa humilis =

Species of tunicate

Asterocarpa humilis is a species of ascidian tunicate first described in 1878 as Styela humilis by Camill Heller.

They are a sessile, subtropical species found in depths up to 26m, in the Indo-Pacificm and the temperate seas of Australia: New Zealand, Chile and South Africa.

As a member of the class Ascidiacea, the species is hermaphroditic allowing both cross- and self-fertilization. The eggs develop into larva before metamorphosis into benthic adults.
