= Chorizocarpa =

Scientific classification
- Kingdom: Animalia
- Phylum: Chordata
- Subphylum: Tunicata
- Class: Ascidiacea
- Order: Stolidobranchia
- Family: Styelidae
- Genus: Chorizocarpa; Michaelsen, 1904

Species
- See text

Genus of sea squirts

Chorizocarpa is a genus of ascidian tunicates in the family Styelidae.

Species within the genus Chorizocarpa include:

- Chorizocarpa guttata Michaelsen, 1904
- Chorizocarpa michaelseni (Sluiter, 1900)
- Chorizocarpa sydneyensis (Herdman, 1891)

Species names currently considered to be synonyms:

- Chorizocarpa elegans (Quoy & Gaimard, 1834): synonym of Botryllus elegans (Quoy & Gaimard, 1834)
- Chorizocarpa sydneiensis (Herdman, 1891): synonym of Chorizocarpa sydneyensis (Herdman, 1891)
