= Seriocarpa =

Scientific classification
- Kingdom: Animalia
- Phylum: Chordata
- Subphylum: Tunicata
- Class: Ascidiacea
- Order: Stolidobranchia
- Family: Styelidae
- Genus: Seriocarpa; Diehl, 1969

Species
- See text

Genus of sea squirts

Seriocarpa is a genus of ascidian tunicates in the family Styelidae.

Species within the genus Seriocarpa include:

- Seriocarpa benthedi Monniot & Monniot, 1985
- Seriocarpa cristata Millar, 1975
- Seriocarpa littoralis Millar, 1975
- Seriocarpa rhizoides Dielh, 1969
- Seriocarpa tongae Monniot & Monniot, 2001
