= Bathypera =

Scientific classification
- Kingdom: Animalia
- Phylum: Chordata
- Subphylum: Tunicata
- Class: Ascidiacea
- Order: Stolidobranchia
- Family: Pyuridae
- Genus: Bathypera; Michaelsen, 1904

Species
- See text

Genus of sea squirts

Bathypera is a genus of ascidian tunicates in the family Pyuridae.

Species within the genus Bathypera include:

- Bathypera feminalba Young & Vazquez, 1995
- Bathypera goreaui Millar & Goodbody, 1974
- Bathypera hastaefera Vinogradova, 1962
- Bathypera ovoida (Ritter, 1907)
- Bathypera splendens (Michaelsen, 1904)
