= Hartmeyeria =

Scientific classification
- Kingdom: Animalia
- Phylum: Chordata
- Subphylum: Tunicata
- Class: Ascidiacea
- Order: Stolidobranchia
- Family: Pyuridae
- Genus: Hartmeyeria; Ritter, 1913

Species
- See text

Genus of sea squirts

Hartmeyeria is a genus of ascidian tunicates in the family Pyuridae.

Species within the genus Hartmeyeria include:

- Hartmeyeria arctica Korczynski, 1989
- Hartmeyeria bouilloni Monniot & Monniot, 1976
- Hartmeyeria chinensis Tokioka, 1967
- Hartmeyeria formosa (Herdman, 1881)
- Hartmeyeria hupferi (Hartmeyer, 1909)
- Hartmeyeria monarchica Hartmeyer, 1922
- Hartmeyeria orientalis Oka, 1929
- Hartmeyeria pedunculata (Peres, 1949)
- Hartmeyeria triangularis Ritter, 1913

Species names currently considered to be synonyms:

- Hartmeyeria longistigmata Tokioka, 1949: synonym of Hartmeyeria triangularis Ritter, 1913
