= Botryllocarpa =

Scientific classification
- Kingdom: Animalia
- Phylum: Chordata
- Subphylum: Tunicata
- Class: Ascidiacea
- Order: Stolidobranchia
- Family: Styelidae
- Genus: Botryllocarpa; Hartmeyer, 1909

Species
- See text

Genus of sea squirts

Botryllocarpa is a genus of ascidian tunicates in the family Styelidae.

Species within the genus Botryllocarpa include:

- Botryllocarpa elongata Kott, 1990
- Botryllocarpa viridis (Pizon, 1908)
