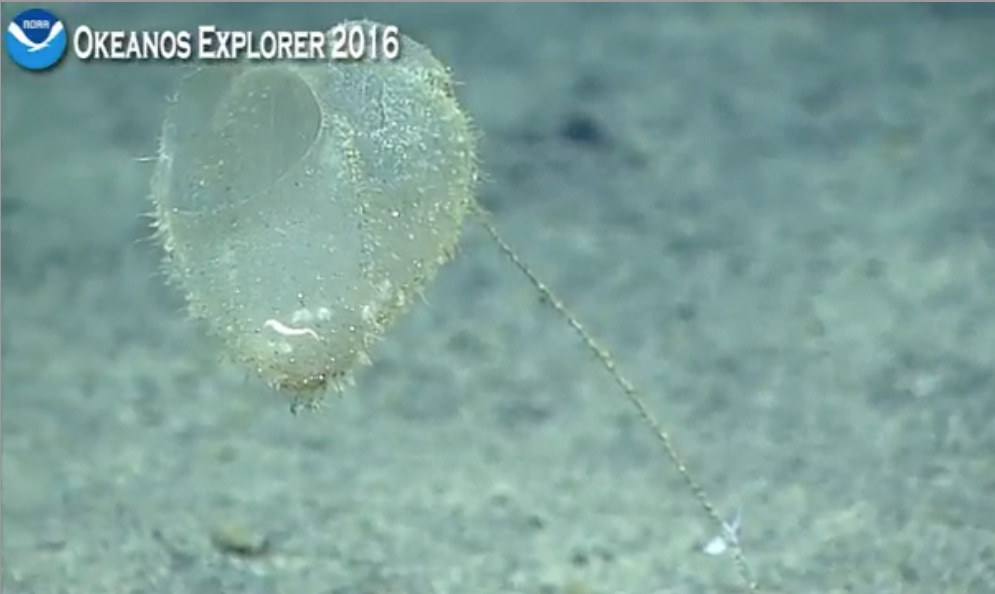
- A deep-sea carnivorous tunicate of the genus Culeolus observed close to the Mariana islands by NOAA Okeanos in 2016.

Scientific classification
- Kingdom: Animalia
- Phylum: Chordata
- Subphylum: Tunicata
- Class: Ascidiacea
- Order: Stolidobranchia
- Family: Pyuridae
- Genus: Culeolus; Herdman, 1881

Species
- See text

= Culeolus =

Genus of sea squirts

Culeolus is a genus of ascidian tunicates in the family Pyuridae.

Species within the genus Culeolus include:

- Culeolus annulatus Sluiter, 1904
- Culeolus anonymus Monniot & Monniot, 1976
- Culeolus antarcticus Vinogradova, 1962
- Culeolus caudatus Monniot & Monniot, 1991
- Culeolus easteeri Tokioka, 1967
- Culeolus easteri Tokioka, 1967
- Culeolus elegans Monniot & Monniot, 1991
- Culeolus gigas Sluiter, 1904
- Culeolus herdmani Sluiter, 1904
- Culeolus hospitalis Monniot & Monniot, 2003
- Culeolus likae Sanamyan & Sanamyan, 2002
- Culeolus longipedunculatus Vinogradova, 1970
- Culeolus moseleyi Herdman, 1881
- Culeolus murrayi Herdman, 1881
- Culeolus nadejdae Sanamyan, 1992
- Culeolus parvus Millar, 1970
- Culeolus pinguis Monniot & Monniot, 1982
- Culeolus pyramidalis Ritter, 1907
- Culeolus quadrula Sluiter, 1904
- Culeolus recumbens Herdman, 1881
- Culeolus robustus Vinogradova, 1970
- Culeolus sluiteri Ritter, 1913
- Culeolus suhmi Herdman, 1881
- Culeolus tenuis Vinogradova, 1970
- Culeolus thysanotus Sluiter, 1904
- Culeolus wyville-thomsoni Herdman, 1881

Species names currently considered to be synonyms:

- Culeolus littoralis Kott, 1956: synonym of Pyura littoralis (Kott, 1956)
- Culeolus moseley Herdman, 1881: synonym of Culeolus moseleyi Herdman, 1881
- Culeolus perlucidus Herdman, 1881: synonym of Fungulus perlucidus (Herdman, 1881)
- Culeolus tanneri Verrill, 1885: synonym of Culeolus suhmi Herdman, 1881
- Culeolus uschakovi Redikorzev, 1941: synonym of Culeolus suhmi Herdman, 1881
- Culeolus wyvillethomsoni Herdman, 1881: synonym of Culeolus wyville-thomsoni Herdman, 1881
