= Podostyela =

Scientific classification
- Kingdom: Animalia
- Phylum: Chordata
- Subphylum: Tunicata
- Class: Ascidiacea
- Order: Stolidobranchia
- Family: Styelidae
- Genus: Podostyela; Harant & Vernières, 1933
- Species: P. grynfeltti

Binomial name
- Podostyela grynfeltti Harant & Vernières, 1933

Genus of sea squirts

Podostyela is a genus of ascidian tunicates in the family Styelidae. The only species is Podostyela grynfeltti.
