= Protostyela =

Scientific classification
- Kingdom: Animalia
- Phylum: Chordata
- Subphylum: Tunicata
- Class: Ascidiacea
- Order: Stolidobranchia
- Family: Styelidae
- Genus: Protostyela; Millar, 1954

Species
- See text

Genus of sea squirts

Protostyela is a genus of ascidian tunicates in the family Styelidae.

Species within the genus Protostyela include:

- Protostyela heterobranchia Millar, 1954
- Protostyela longicauda Monniot, Vazquez, White, 1995
