= Berillia =

Scientific classification
- Kingdom: Animalia
- Phylum: Chordata
- Subphylum: Tunicata
- Class: Ascidiacea
- Order: Stolidobranchia
- Family: Styelidae
- Genus: Berillia; Brewin, 1952
- Species: B. boltenioides

Binomial name
- Berillia boltenioides Brewin, 1952

Genus of Ascidiacea

Berillia is a genus of ascidian tunicates in the family Styelidae. The only species is Berillia boltenioides.
