= Tibitin =

Scientific classification
- Kingdom: Animalia
- Phylum: Chordata
- Subphylum: Tunicata
- Class: Ascidiacea
- Order: Stolidobranchia
- Family: Styelidae
- Genus: Tibitin; Monniot, 1983

Species
- See text

Genus of sea squirts

Tibitin is a genus of ascidian tunicates in the family Styelidae.

Species within the genus Tibitin include:

- Tibitin halimedae Monniot, 1983
- Tibitin manu Monniot & Monniot, 1987
- Tibitin probatus Monniot C. & Monniot F., 1987
- Tibitin transversalis (Tokioka, 1963)
