= Dextrocarpa =

Scientific classification
- Kingdom: Animalia
- Phylum: Chordata
- Subphylum: Tunicata
- Class: Ascidiacea
- Order: Stolidobranchia
- Family: Styelidae
- Genus: Dextrocarpa; Millar, 1955

Species
- See text

Genus of sea squirts

Dextrocarpa is a genus of ascidian tunicates in the family Styelidae.

Species within the genus Dextrocarpa include:

- Dextrocarpa misanthropos Monniot, 1978
- Dextrocarpa solitaris Millar, 1955
