= Cratostigma =

Scientific classification
- Kingdom: Animalia
- Phylum: Chordata
- Subphylum: Tunicata
- Class: Ascidiacea
- Order: Stolidobranchia
- Family: Pyuridae
- Genus: Cratostigma; Monniot & Monniot, 1961

Species
- See text

Genus of sea squirts

Cratostigma is a genus of ascidian tunicates in the family Pyuridae.

Species within the genus Cratostigma include:

- Cratostigma campoyi Ramos, Turon & Lafargue, 1988
- Cratostigma gravellophila (Pérès, 1955)
- Cratostigma intermedia Vazquez & Ramos-Espla, 1993
- Cratostigma regularis Monniot C., 1963
- Cratostigma simplex Millar, 1982
- Cratostigma singularis (Van Name, 1912)
- Cratostigma vestigialis Turon, 1988
