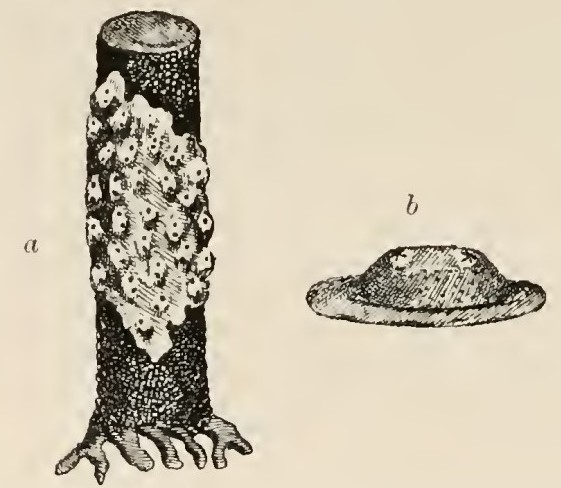
- Distoma variolosum. (After Gaertner, loc. cit.) a, a colony, natural size; b, a single individual, enlarged.

Scientific classification
- Kingdom: Animalia
- Phylum: Chordata
- Subphylum: Tunicata
- Class: Ascidiacea
- Order: Stolidobranchia
- Family: Styelidae
- Genus: Distomus
- Species: D. variolosus

Binomial name
- Distomus variolosus Gaertner, 1774

= Distomus variolosus =

Species of sea squirt

Distomus variolosus is a species of tunicate or sea squirt in the family Styelidae. It is native to the northeastern Atlantic Ocean where it lives on the seabed, typically on the stems and fronds of kelp.

== Description ==
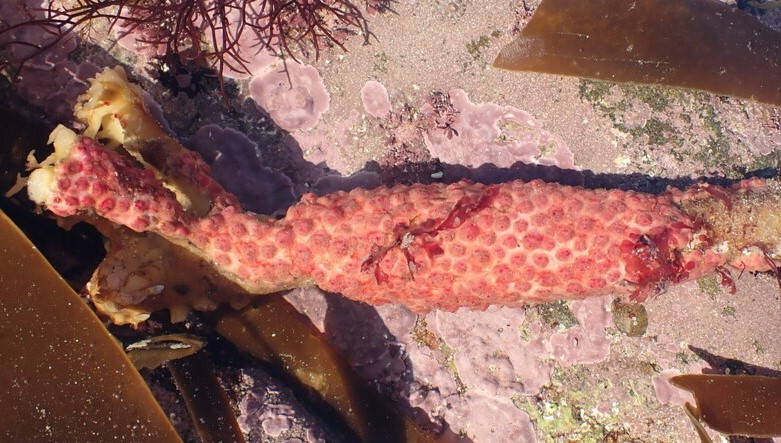
Distomus variolosus on a Laminaria kelp stipe. Brittany, France.

Distomus variolosus is a colonial sea squirt that forms leathery patches, often encircling the stems of kelp. The zooids are globose or ovoid and about 1 cm (0.4 in) high, with the two short siphons close together near the apex. It is difficult to distinguish the buccal siphon from the exhalant siphon. The zooids are separate, but linked by the base or the sides. Zooids with closed siphons have a warty appearance, giving the species its specific name. Generally red, the colonies may be spotted with yellow, brown or pink.

== Distribution and habitat ==
Distomus variolosus is found in the northeastern Atlantic Ocean. Its range extends from the southwest of Great Britain and Ireland as far south as Portugal. It has been reported from the Mediterranean Sea but this is probably a misidentification of Distomus fuscus, which is believed to be the only member of the genus to be found in the Mediterranean. It typically grows on the stems and blades of kelp, such as Laminaria digitata, Laminaria hyperborea and Saccharina latissima, at the base of hydroids, and sometimes colonises the shells of crustaceans such as the spider crab, Maja brachydactyla.

== Biology ==
Sea squirts take in water through the buccal siphon and expel it through the exhalant siphon, having filtered out any edible particles. The colonies grow by budding new zooids. Distomus variolosus is a hermaphrodite. Sexual reproduction takes place with sperm being liberated into the sea by a male phase zooid. When this is drawn into a female phase zooid, fertilisation takes place and the larva is brooded in the sea squirt's body cavity. When it is mature enough, it is expelled into the water column, and after a short planktonic life, settles on the substrate to form a new colony.
