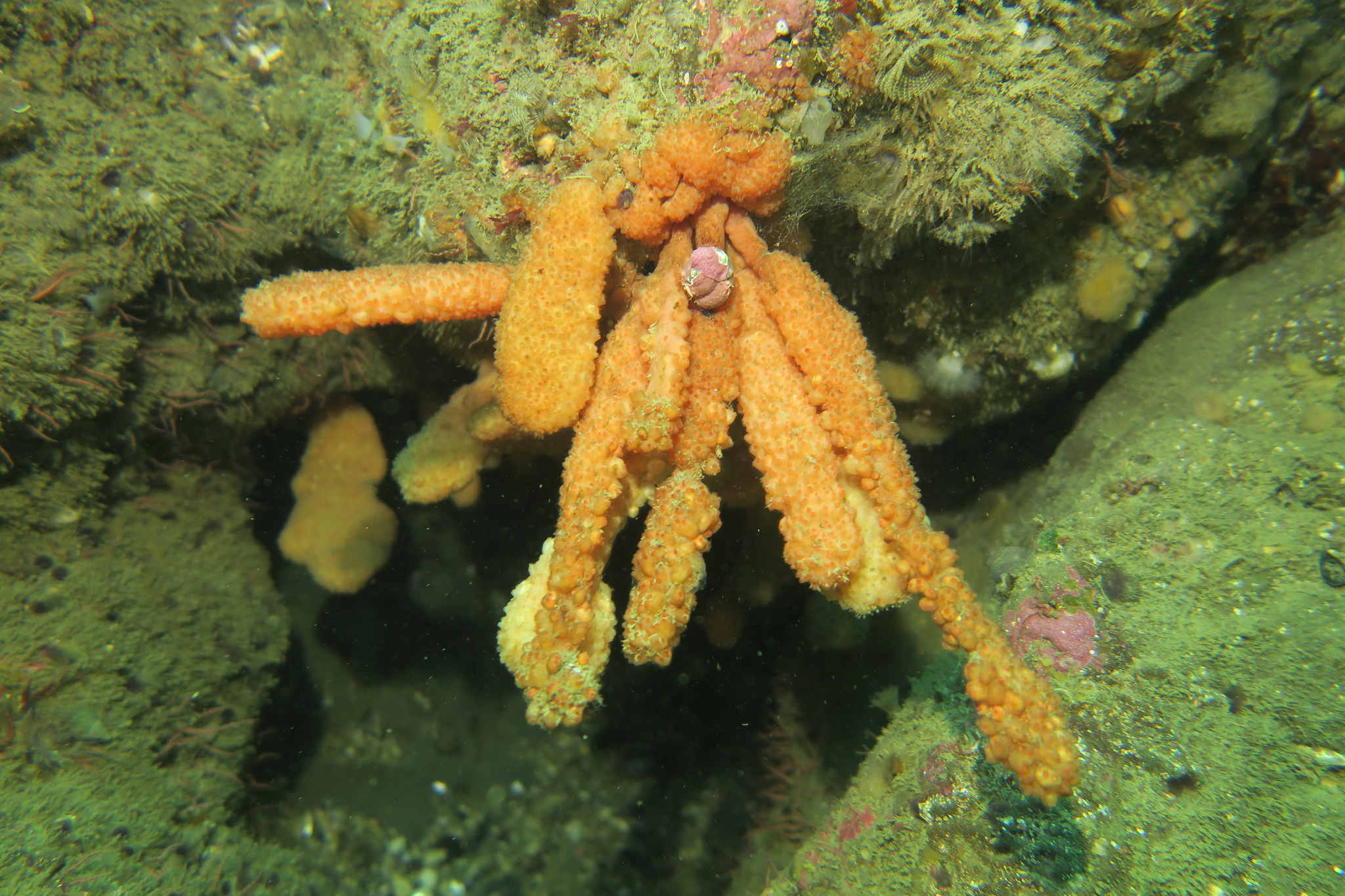
- Polyzoa opuntia

Scientific classification
- Kingdom: Animalia
- Phylum: Chordata
- Subphylum: Tunicata
- Class: Ascidiacea
- Order: Stolidobranchia
- Family: Styelidae
- Genus: Polyzoa; Lesson, 1831

Species
- See text

= Polyzoa (tunicate) =

Genus of tunicates

Polyzoa is a genus of ascidian tunicates in the family Styelidae.

Species within the genus Polyzoa include:

- Polyzoa atlantica Sanamyan et al., 2009
- Polyzoa exigua Kott, 1990
- Polyzoa insularis Millar, 1967
- Polyzoa minor Monniot, 1970
- Polyzoa nodosa Kott, 1990
- Polyzoa opuntia Lesson, 1830
- Polyzoa pacifica Tokioka, 1951
- Polyzoa translucida Ritter & Forsyth, 1917
- Polyzoa vesiculiphora Tokioka, 1951
- Polyzoa violacea (Oka, 1915)

Species names currently considered to be synonyms:

- Polyzoa coccinea (Cunningham, 1871): synonym of Polyzoa opuntia Lesson, 1830
- Polyzoa depressa (Oka, 1926): synonym of Polyzoa violacea (Oka, 1915)
- Polyzoa falclandica Michaelsen, 1900: synonym of Polyzoa opuntia Lesson, 1830
- Polyzoa falklandica Michaelsen, 1900: synonym of Polyzoa opuntia Lesson, 1830
- Polyzoa gordiana Michaelsen, 1900: synonym of Polyzoa opuntia Lesson, 1830
- Polyzoa herdmani Michaelsen, 1900: synonym of Polyzoa opuntia Lesson, 1830
- Polyzoa lennoxensis Michaelsen, 1900: synonym of Polyzoa opuntia Lesson, 1830
- Polyzoa pictonis Michaelsen, 1900: synonym of Polyzoa opuntia Lesson, 1830
- Polyzoa reticulata (Herdman, 1886): synonym of Chorizocormus reticulatus Herdman, 1886
- Polyzoa sagamiana Tokioka, 1953: synonym of Polyzoa violacea (Oka, 1915)
