= Heterostigma (tunicate) =

Scientific classification
- Kingdom: Animalia
- Phylum: Chordata
- Subphylum: Tunicata
- Class: Ascidiacea
- Order: Stolidobranchia
- Family: Pyuridae
- Genus: Heterostigma; Ärnbäck-Christie-Linde, 1924

Species
- See text

Genus of tunicates

Heterostigma is a genus of ascidian tunicates in the family Pyuridae.

Species within the genus Heterostigma include:

- Heterostigma fagei Monniot C. & Monniot F., 1961
- Heterostigma gonochorica Monniot F., 1965
- Heterostigma mediterranea Pérès, 1958
- Heterostigma melitensis Monniot F. & Monniot C., 1976
- Heterostigma reptans Monniot C. & Monniot F., 1963
- Heterostigma separ Ärnbäck, 1924

Species names currently considered to be synonyms:

- Heterostigma gravellophila Peres, 1955: synonym of Cratostigma gravellophila (Pérès, 1955)
- Heterostigma singulare (Van Name, 1912): synonym of Cratostigma singularis (Van Name, 1912)
- Heterostigma singularis (Van Name, 1912): synonym of Cratostigma singularis (Van Name, 1912)
