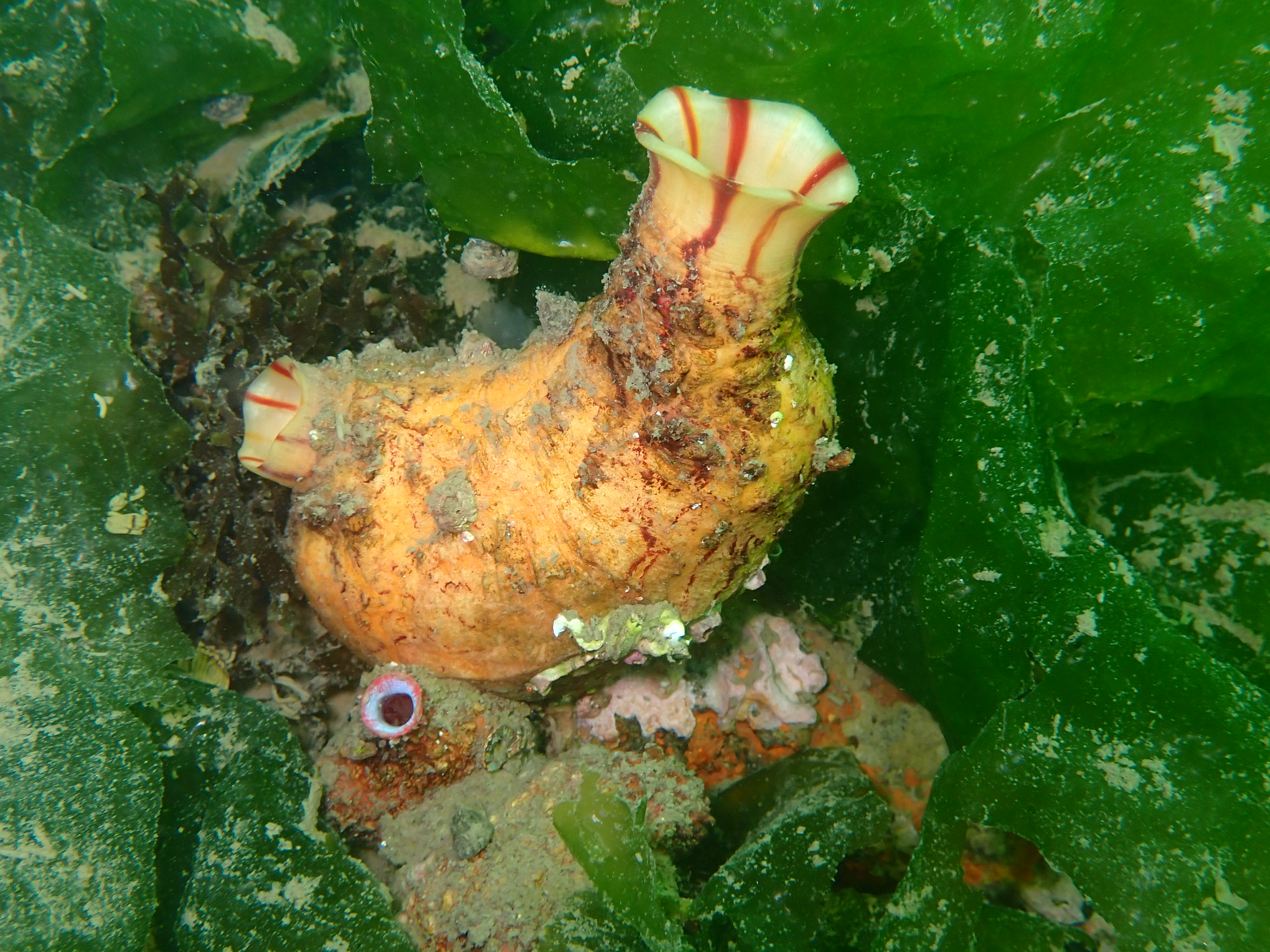
- Microcosmus sabatieri

Scientific classification
- Kingdom: Animalia
- Phylum: Chordata
- Subphylum: Tunicata
- Class: Ascidiacea
- Order: Stolidobranchia
- Family: Pyuridae

Genera
- See text

= Pyuridae =

Family of sea squirts

Pyuridae is a family of tunicates.

Species of Halocynthia, Microcosmus and Pyura are eaten as seafoods.

== Genera ==
- Bathypera
- Bathypyura Monniot & Monniot, 1973
- Boltenia
- Bolteniopsis
- Claudenus Kott, 1998
- Cratostigma
- Ctenyura
- Culeolus
- Halocynthia
- Hartmeyeria
- Hemistyela Millar, 1955
- Herdmania
- Heterostigma
- Microcosmus
- Paraculeolus Vinogradova, 1970
- Pyura

== See also ==
- Sea peach
