= Kukenthalia =

Scientific classification
- Kingdom: Animalia
- Phylum: Chordata
- Subphylum: Tunicata
- Class: Ascidiacea
- Order: Stolidobranchia
- Family: Styelidae
- Genus: Kukenthalia; Hartmeyer, 1903
- Species: K. borealis

Binomial name
- Kukenthalia borealis (Gottschaldt, 1894)

Genus of sea squirts

Kukenthalia is a genus of ascidian tunicates in the family Styelidae.

The only species in the genus Kukenthalia is Kukenthalia borealis (Gottschaldt, 1894).
