= Filter feeder =

Animals that feed by straining food from water

Krill, a marine arthropod, feeding in a high phytoplankton concentration (slowed by a factor of 12)

Filter feeders, also known as suspension feeders, are aquatic animals that feed on organic matter, food particles or smaller organisms (bacteria, microalgae and zooplanktons) suspended in water, typically by having the water pass over or through a specialized filtering organ that sieves out and/or traps solids. Filter feeders can play an important role in condensing biomass and removing excess nutrients (such as nitrogen and phosphate) from the local waterbody, and are therefore considered water-cleaning ecosystem engineers. They are also important in bioaccumulation and, as a result, are indicator organisms. Filter feeders can be sessile or motile.

Extant species that rely on such method of feeding encompass numerous phyla, including poriferans (sponges), cnidarians (jellyfish, sea pens and corals), arthropods (krill, mysids and barnacles), molluscs including many bivalves, echinoderms (sea lilies) and chordates including most species of forage fish, baleen whales, manta ray, and a few sharks. Some water birds, such as flamingos and some ducks are filter feeders. The mechanism has evolved repeatedly by convergent evolution.

== History of discovery ==
The first filter-feeding mechanism proposed was sieving, by Joshua Alder and Albany Hancock in 1851. The sieve theory implies that only particles as big as the mesh of the sieve can be trapped. In 1905, Hans T. S. Wallengren proposed an alternative theory, that sticky limbs of the filters of animals such as mussels could collide with and trap particles smaller than the mesh size. In 1968, the New Zealand marine zoologist John S. Bullivant classified suspension feeders in more detail according to their specific methods of feeding, including 'impingement feeding', 'ciliary feeding', 'filter feeding' using mucus, and 'collision feeding'.

== Feeding mechanism ==
Filter feeding solves the problem of obtaining food from a very dilute suspension in water. It requires in principle a system (such as a muscular pump) that creates a flow of water over a filter (such as gills), and a transport mechanism (such as gill rakers or cilia) to bring food from the filter to the mouth.

Filter feeding is a feeding mechanism used by aquatic animals to gather particles of food from the water around them, by having the water pass over or through a specialized filter that traps solids. An essential component of a filter feeding mechanism is a pump to force a flow of water over the filter. Among benthic invertebrates, some use cilia to create the flow, while others use muscles. Filter-feeders using cilia include tunicates, sponges, bivalves, bryozoans, and some polychaetes. Other polychaetes use muscular mechanisms. Filter feeders can be sessile or mobile, depending on the species and the niches they have evolved to occupy.

The challenge that filter-feeding solves is that food particles are at extremely low density in water, so any animal feeding on suspended particles has to extract the food from a large volume of water. If the feeding system consists of pumping water through a filter, both the pump and the filter need to be efficient. The Bernouilli equation can be used to model the relationship between the pressure, the kinetic energy, and the potential energy. In still water, the kinetic energy of the incoming water is zero, unless the animal has for example a siphon facing into a water current. The flow through a system of tubes such as a filter is reduced by the kinematic viscosity (resistance to flow) of the tubes (described by their low Reynolds number). The kinematic viscosity increases sharply (with the cube of the diameter) as the tubes become narrower, meaning that the finer the filter, the more energy is needed to drive water through it. Among filter-feeding forage fishes such as the herring and pilchard, the flow is created by swimming with the mouth open, resulting in ram feeding, with no buccal pumping by the mouthparts.

Suspension feeders use a wide variety of organs to filter their food out of the water. In 1928, C. M. Yonge listed six types of filter feeding organ:

Types of filter feeding organ identified by C. M. Yonge
Organ makes use of	Taxon
Pseudopodia	Foraminifera (shelled amoebae)
Cilia	Polyzoa (a tunicate)
Tentacles	Dendrochirotida (sea cucumbers)
Mucus	Vermetus (a gastropod)
Muscles	Rhizostoma (a jellyfish)
Setae	Barnacles (sessile arthropods)

Given this diversity, in 1968 Bullivant sorted animals by their feeding mechanism into four groups.

Types of filter feeding mechanism identified by J. S. Bullivant
Mechanism	Example taxa	Notes
Impingement feeding	Lophophorata	Cilia on tentacles of lophophore create feeding current.
Ciliary feeding	Serpulidae (tube-building polychaete worms)	Cilia on cirri create feeding current from under the cirri. Cilia then carry food particles from cirri to mouth.
Using mucus	Polychaete worms e.g. Chaetopterus, Nereis	Mucous trap.
Collision feeding	Vermetus (a gastropod)	Animal secretes strings of mucus; food particles collide with these.

== Ecological effects ==
Filter feeders can play an important role in removing excess nutrients (such as nitrogen and phosphate) from water bodies, and are therefore considered water-cleaning ecosystem engineers. In addition, they help to stabilise ecosystems, and help to make habitats heterogeneous. They are important in bioaccumulation and as such can serve as indicator organisms.

== Taxonomic range ==
Filter feeding is found in multiple groups of animals, many of them marine. It has evolved repeatedly by convergent evolution.

- Animals
  - Sponges
  - - Cnidaria
    - - - Crinoidea
        - - Lancelets
          - - Tunicates
            - Vertebrates
              - some Chondrichthyes (sharks, manta rays)
              - - many Actinopterygii (forage fishes e.g. Atlantic menhaden)
                - - Baleen whales
                  - - a few †Sauropterygia (marine reptiles e.g. Henodus, Atopodentatus)
                    - - a few †Pterosaurs (winged reptiles e.g. Pterodaustro)
                      - some Birds (flamingos, ducks, prions)
      - - Arthropods
          - - Barnacles
            - Malacostraca (shrimps, krill)
          - - Branchiopoda (fairy shrimps, water fleas)
            - Insects (aquatic insect larvae)
        - - Bivalves
          - Lophophorata
            - - Brachiopoda
              - Phoronida
            - Bryozoa

== See also ==
- Particle (ecology)
- Planktivore
- Predation

== Sources ==
- Cohen, B. L.; Holmer, L. E.; Lüter, C. (2003). "The brachiopod fold: a neglected body plan hypothesis" (PDF). Palaeontology. 46 (1): 59–65. Bibcode:2003Palgy..46...59C. doi:10.1111/1475-4983.00287.
- Doherty, P. J. (2001). "The Lophophorates". In Anderson, D. T. (ed.). Invertebrate Zoology (2nd ed.). Oxford University Press. pp. 356–363. ISBN 978-0-19-551368-4.
- Ruppert, E. E.; Fox, R. S.; Barnes, R. D. (2004). Invertebrate zoology: a functional evolutionary approach. Thomas-Brooks/Cole. ISBN 978-0-03-025982-1. OCLC 475257771.
