= Beryl Brewin =

New Zealand zoologist (1910–1999)

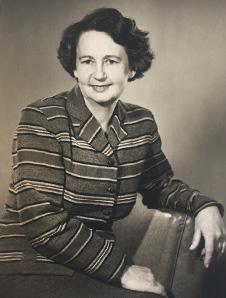
- Brewin in 1963 or earlier
- Born: Beryl Iris Brewin; 10 September 1910
- Died: 8 January 1999 (aged 88)
- Education: University of Auckland, University of Otago
- Scientific career
- Fields: Ascidian zoology
- Workplaces: University of Otago
- Thesis: Papers on the class Ascidiacea, and on other marine topics : comprising a thesis presented for the degree of D.Sc., University of New Zealand (1958)

Beryl Iris Brewin (10 September 1910 – 8 January 1999) was a New Zealand marine zoologist, specialising in ascidians (sea squirts).

== Academic career ==
Brewin was born 10 September 1910 to parents Lucy and Frank Brewin. She graduated from Auckland University College in 1931 with a Bachelor of Science in botany and zoology. This was followed by an MSc in botany in 1933.

Brewin, described as a 'live wire', worked at the University of Otago Department of Zoology from 1936 to 1963. She had reached senior lecturer level when she retired.

Brewin submitted her Doctor of Science thesis, consisting of 18 papers published between 1942 and 1957 to the University of New Zealand in 1958. According to GBIF, she named more than 80 species or genera from New Zealand and Australia.

In 1954, Brewin was the second woman to be appointed to the Council of the Royal Society Te Apārangi, after her colleague Marion Fyfe, also from the Department of Zoology at Otago. Brewin served four years on the council.

Brewin retired in 1963, and left nearly half a million dollars to the University of Otago in 1999, for the purposes of providing more comfortable accommodation for marine researchers at the Portobello marine laboratory. She also bequeathed $1 million for the purchase of a research vessel, the 10 metres (33 ft) RV Beryl Brewin in her honour.

In 2017, Brewin was selected as one of the Royal Society Te Apārangi's "150 women in 150 words", celebrating the contributions of women to knowledge in New Zealand.

== Selected species named by Brewin ==
- Leptoclinides marmoreus Brewin, 1956
- Synoicum herdmani Brewin, 1956
- Arnbackia novaezelandiae Brewin, 1950
- Aplidium maritimum Brewin, 1958
- Aplidium knoxi Brewin, 1956
- Alloeocarpa minuta Brewin, 1951
- Botryllus stewartensis Brewin, 1958
- Pseudodistoma opacum Brewin, 1950
- Pyura rugata Brewin, 1948
- Aplidium benhami Brewin, 1946
- Aplidium siphonum Brewin, 1956
- Pyura carnea Brewin, 1948
- Leptoclinides sluiteri Brewin, 1950
- Ritterella sigillinoides Brewin, 1958
- Aplidium powelli Brewin, 1958
- Amaroucium maritimum Brewin, 1958
- Distaplia taylori Brewin, 1950

== Selected works ==
- Brewin, Beryl Iris (1942). "The Breeding Habits of Cryptoconchus porosus (Burrow)" (PDF). Transactions and Proceedings of the Royal Society of New Zealand. 72: 186–190. ISSN 1176-6166. Wikidata Q89182689.
- Brewin, Beryl Iris (1945). "Some Alcyonaria of the Order Stolonifera from New Zealand Waters, with the Description of One New Species" (PDF). Transactions and Proceedings of the Royal Society of New Zealand. 75: 29–32. ISSN 1176-6166. Wikidata Q89182832.
- Brewin, Beryl Iris (1946). "Ascidians in the Vicinity of the Portobello Marine Biological Station, Otago Harbour" (PDF). Transactions and Proceedings of the Royal Society of New Zealand. 76: 87–131. ISSN 1176-6166. Wikidata Q89182884.
- Brewin, Beryl Iris (1948). "Ascidians of the Hauraki Gulf. Part I." (PDF). Transactions and Proceedings of the Royal Society of New Zealand. 77: 115–138. ISSN 1176-6166. Wikidata Q89182966.
- Brewin, Beryl Iris (1951). "Seasonal Changes in Micro-plankton in the Otago Harbour during the Years 1944 and 1945" (PDF). Transactions and Proceedings of the Royal Society of New Zealand. 79: 614–629. ISSN 1176-6166. Wikidata Q89183310.
- Brewin, Beryl Iris (1953). "Australian Ascidians of the Sub-family Holozoinae and a Review of the Sub-family" (PDF). Transactions of the Royal Society of New Zealand. 81: 53–64. ISSN 0035-9181. Wikidata Q89183373.
- Brewin, Beryl Iris (1954), Former Professors of Zoology at the University of Otago, Dunedin, Wikidata Q104627162
