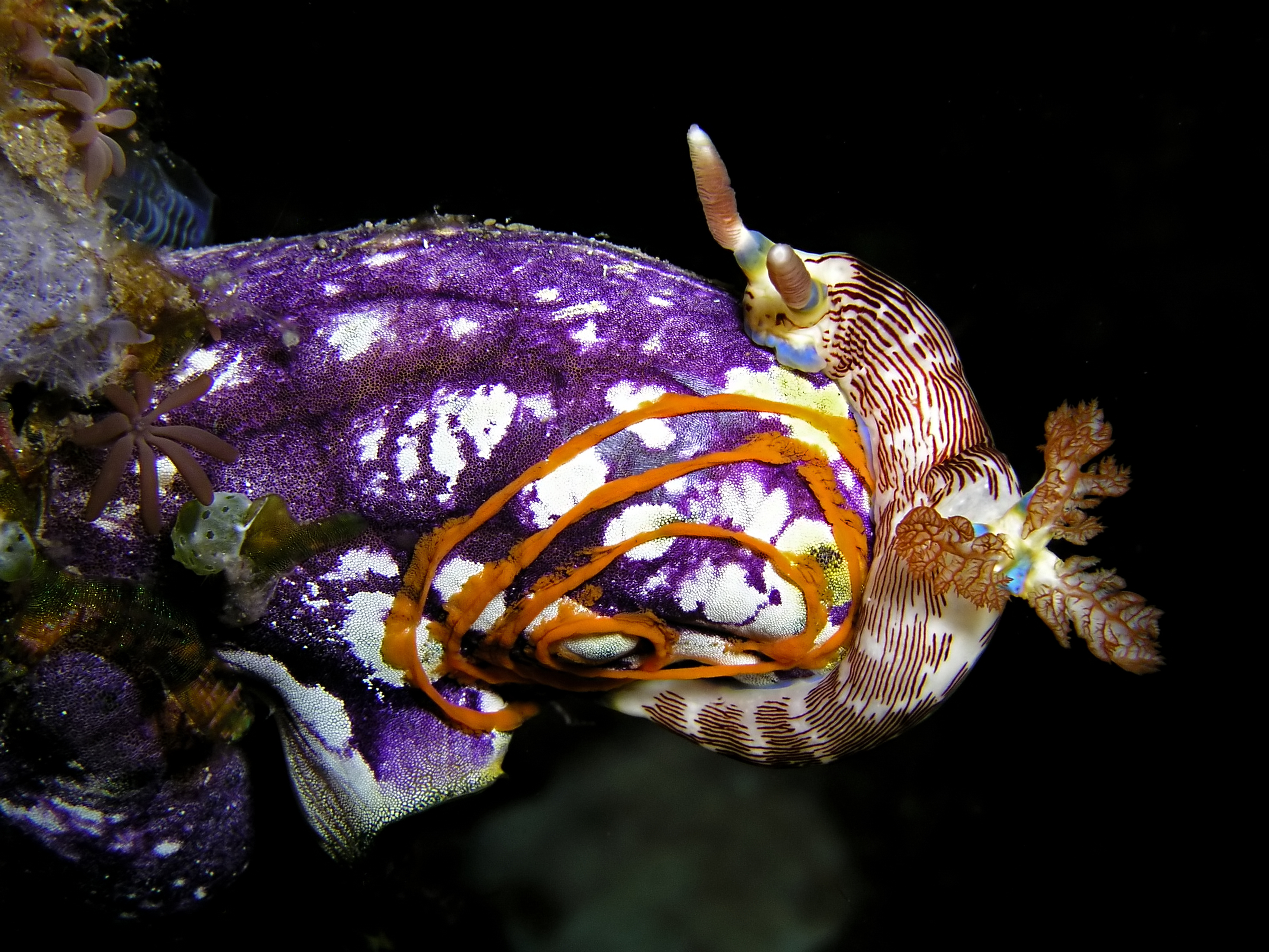
- Polycarpa aurata

Scientific classification
- Kingdom: Animalia
- Phylum: Chordata
- Subphylum: Tunicata
- Class: Ascidiacea
- Order: Stolidobranchia
- Family: Styelidae; Herdman, 1881

Genera
- See text

= Styelidae =

Family of sea squirts

Styelidae is a family of ascidian tunicates.

== Genera ==
- Alloeocarpa Michaelsen, 1900
- Arnbackia Brewin, 1950
- Asterocarpa Brewin, 1946
- Bathyoncus Herdman, 1882
- Bathystyeloides Seeliger, 1907
- Berillia Brewin, 1952
- Botryllocarpa Hartmeyer, 1909
- Botrylloides Milne-Edwards, 1841
- Botryllus Gaertner, 1774
- Chorizocarpa Michaelsen, 1904
- Chorizocormus Herdman, 1886
- Cnemidocarpa Huntsman, 1913
- Dendrodoa MacLeay, 1824
- Dextrocarpa Millar, 1955
- Diandrocarpa Van Name, 1902
- Dicarpa Millar, 1955
- Distomus Gaertner, 1774
- Eusynstyela Michaelsen, 1904
- Gynandrocarpa Michaelsen, 1900
- Kukenthalia Hartmeyer, 1903
- Metandrocarpa Michaelsen, 1904
- Monandrocarpa Michaelsen, 1904
- Oculinaria Gray, 1868
- Oligocarpa Hartmeyer, 1911
- Pelonaia Forbes & Goodsir, 1841
- Podostyela Harant & Vernières, 1933
- Polyandrocarpa Michaelsen, 1904
- Polycarpa Heller, 1877
- Polyzoa Lesson, 1831
- Protostyela Millar, 1954
- Psammobotrus Oka, 1932
- Psammostyela Weinstein, 1961
- Seriocarpa Diehl, 1969
- Stolonica Lacaze-Duthiers & Délage, 1892
- Styela Fleming, 1822
- Symplegma Herdman, 1886
- Syncarpa Redikorzev, 1913
- Theodorella Michaelsen, 1922
- Tibitin Monniot, 1983

Nomina nuda

- Styeloides Sluiter, 1895
- Synstyela Giard, 1874
