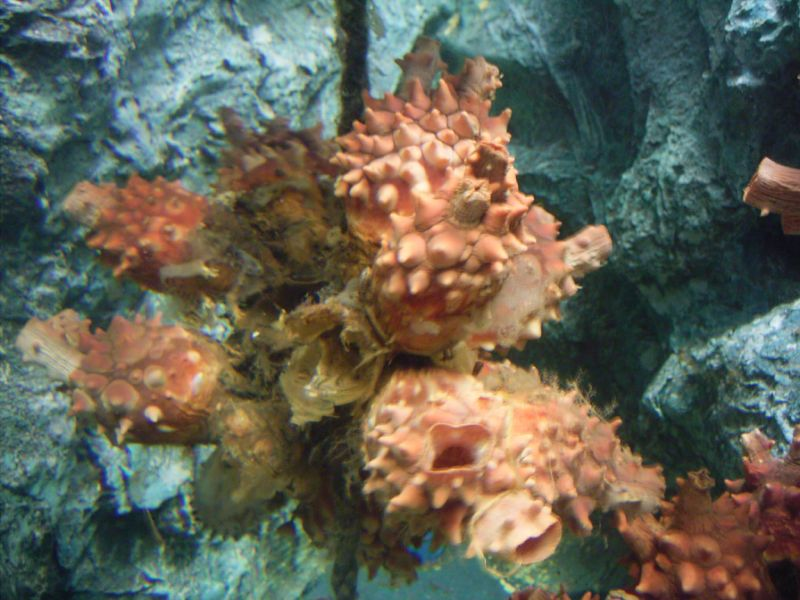
- Halocynthia roretzi

Scientific classification
- Kingdom: Animalia
- Phylum: Chordata
- Subphylum: Tunicata
- Class: Ascidiacea
- Order: Stolidobranchia; Lahille, 1887

Families
- See text

= Stolidobranchia =

Order of sea squirts

Stolidobranchia is an order of tunicates in the class Ascidiacea. The group includes both colonial and solitary animals. They are distinguished from other tunicates by the presence of folded pharyngeal baskets. This provides the etymology of their name: in ancient Greek, στολίς, ίδος means the "fold" of a cloth. Stolidobranchian sea squirts are also characterized by the complete absence of an abdomen. The abdominal organs of other tunicates are instead located to one side of the pharyngeal basket in this group.

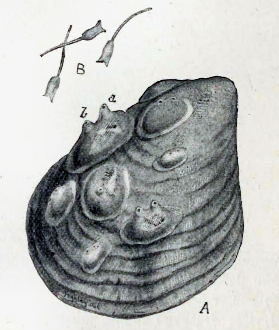
Dendrodoa grossularia (Van Beneden, 1846) A ) on a shell; B) tadpoles (magnified x 9); a) branchial orifice b) atrial orifice

== Taxonomy ==
- Molgulidae Lacaze-Duthiers 1877 [Hexacrobylidae Seeliger 1906; Caesiridae]
  - Anomopera Hartmeyer, 1923
  - Asajirus Kott, 1989 [Hexadactylus Monniot & Monniot 1990]
  - Bostrichobranchus Traustedt, 1883
  - Eugyra Alder & Hancock, 1870 [Eugyrioides Seeliger 1907]
  - Fungulus Herdman, 1882
  - Gamaster Pizon, 1896
  - Minipera Monniot & Monniot, 1974
  - Molgula Forbes, 1848 [Anurella Lacaze-Duthiers 1877; Ascopera Herdman 1881; Astropera Pizon 1898; Caesira Flemming 1822; Ctenicella Lacaze-Duthiers 1877; Cystingia MacLeay 1825; Eugyriopsis Roule 1885; Euritteria Huntsman 1922; Gymnocystis Giard 1872; Lithonephria Giard 1872; Lithonephrya Giard 1872; Meristocarpus Pizon 1899; Molgulidium Seeliger 1907; Molgulina Hartmeyer 1914; Pera Stimpson 1852; Syphonotethis Gervais 1840; Xenomolgula Ärnbäck 1931]
  - Molguloides Huntsman, 1922
  - Namiella Monniot & Monniot, 1968
  - Oligotrema Bourne, 1903 [Gasterascidia Monniot & Monniot 1968; Hexacrobylus Sluiter 1905; Sorbera Monniot & Monniot 1974]
  - Paramolgula Traustedt, 1835 [Stomatropa]
  - Pareugyrioides Hartmeyer, 1914
  - Protomolgula Monniot, 1971
  - Rhizomolgula Ritter, 1901
- Pyuridae Hartmeyer 1908 [Plidaeuridae]
  - Bathypera Michaelsen, 1904 [Halomolgula Ritter 1907]
  - Bathypyura Monniot & Monniot, 1973
  - Boltenia Savigny, 1816
  - Bolteniopsis Harant, 1927 [Liouvillea Sluiter 1929]
  - Claudenus Kott, 1998 [Ctenicella Kott 1972]
  - Cratostigma Monniot & Monniot, 1961
  - Ctenyura Van Name, 1918
  - Culeolus Herdman, 1881
  - Halocynthia Verrill, 1879 [Cynthia Savigny 1816; Holocynthia Verrill 1879; Tethyum Bohadsch 1761]
  - Hartmeyeria Ritter, 1913 [Ectorchis Huntsman 1922]
  - Hemistyela Millar, 1955
  - Herdmania Lahille, 1888 [Rhabdocynthia Herdman 1891]
  - Heterostigma Ärnbäck-Christie-Linde, 1924
  - Microcosmus Heller, 1877
  - Paraculeolus Vinogradova, 1970
  - Pyura Molina, 1782 [Cynthiopsis Michaelsen 1904; Forbesella Lacaze-Duthiers & Delage 1892; Forbesia Lacaze-Duthiers & Delage 1892; Hyalocynthia Oka 1930; Paracynthia Ärnbäck 1938; Podocynthia Oka 1929; Pyuropsis Michaelsen 1912]
- Styelidae Sluiter 1895 [Botryllidae Giard 1875]
  - Alloeocarpa Michaelsen, 1900
  - Arnbackia Brewin, 1950
  - Asterocarpa Brewin, 1946
  - Bathyoncus Herdman, 1882
  - Bathystyeloides Seeliger, 1907
  - Berillia Brewin, 1952
  - Botryllocarpa Hartmeyer, 1909 [Protobotryllus Pizon 1908]
  - Botrylloides Milne-Edwards, 1841 [Metrocarpa Ärnbäck-Christie-Linde 1923; Sarcobotrylloides Drasche 1883]
  - Botryllus Gaertner, 1774 [Alcyonium Pallas 1766; Myxobotrus Oka 1931; Parabotryllus Kott 1975; Polycyclus Lamarck 1815]
  - Chorizocarpa Michaelsen, 1904
  - Cnemidocarpa Huntsman, 1913 [Azygocarpa Oka 1932; Ypsilocarpa Ärnbäck 1922]
  - Dendrodoa MacLeay, 1824 [Styelopsis Traustedt 1883]
  - Dextrocarpa Millar, 1955
  - Diandrocarpa Van Name, 1902
  - Dicarpa Millar, 1955
  - Distomus Gaertner, 1774 [Psilostyela Sluiter 1927]
  - Eusynstyela Michaelsen, 1904 [Michaelsenia Van Name 1902]
  - Gynandrocarpa Michaelsen, 1900
  - Kukenthalia Hartmeyer, 1903
  - Metandrocarpa Michaelsen, 1904 [Okamia Brewin 1948]
  - Monandrocarpa Michaelsen, 1904 [Monoandrocarpa Kott 1972]
  - Oculinaria Gray, 1868
  - Oligocarpa Hartmeyer, 1911
  - Pelonaia Forbes & Goodsir, 1841
  - Podostyela Harant & Vernières, 1933
  - Polyandrocarpa Michaelsen, 1904
  - Polycarpa Heller, 1877 [Glandula Stimpson 1852; Pandocia Fleming 1822; Paratona Huntsman 1913; Styeloides]
  - Polyzoa Lesson, 1831 [Chorizocormus Herdman 1886; Dictyostyela Oka 1926; Goodsiria Cunningham 1871; Monobotryllus (Agassiz 1880)]
  - Protostyela Millar, 1954
  - Psammobotrus Oka, 1932
  - Psammostyela Weinstein, 1961
  - Seriocarpa Diehl, 1969
  - Stolonica Lacaze-Duthiers & Délage, 1892 [Amphicarpa Michaelsen 1922; Thylacium Alder & Hancock 1907]
  - Styela Fleming, 1822 [Botryorchis Huntsman 1911; Clavellinopsis Fewkes 1889; Goniocarpa Huntsman 1912; Katatropa Huntsman 1912; Minostyela Kott 1969; Molstyela Oka 1934; Redikorzevia Oka 1929; Vannamea Oka 1932]
  - Symplegma Herdman, 1886
  - Syncarpa Redikorzev, 1913
  - Theodorella Michaelsen, 1922
  - Tibitin Monniot, 1983
