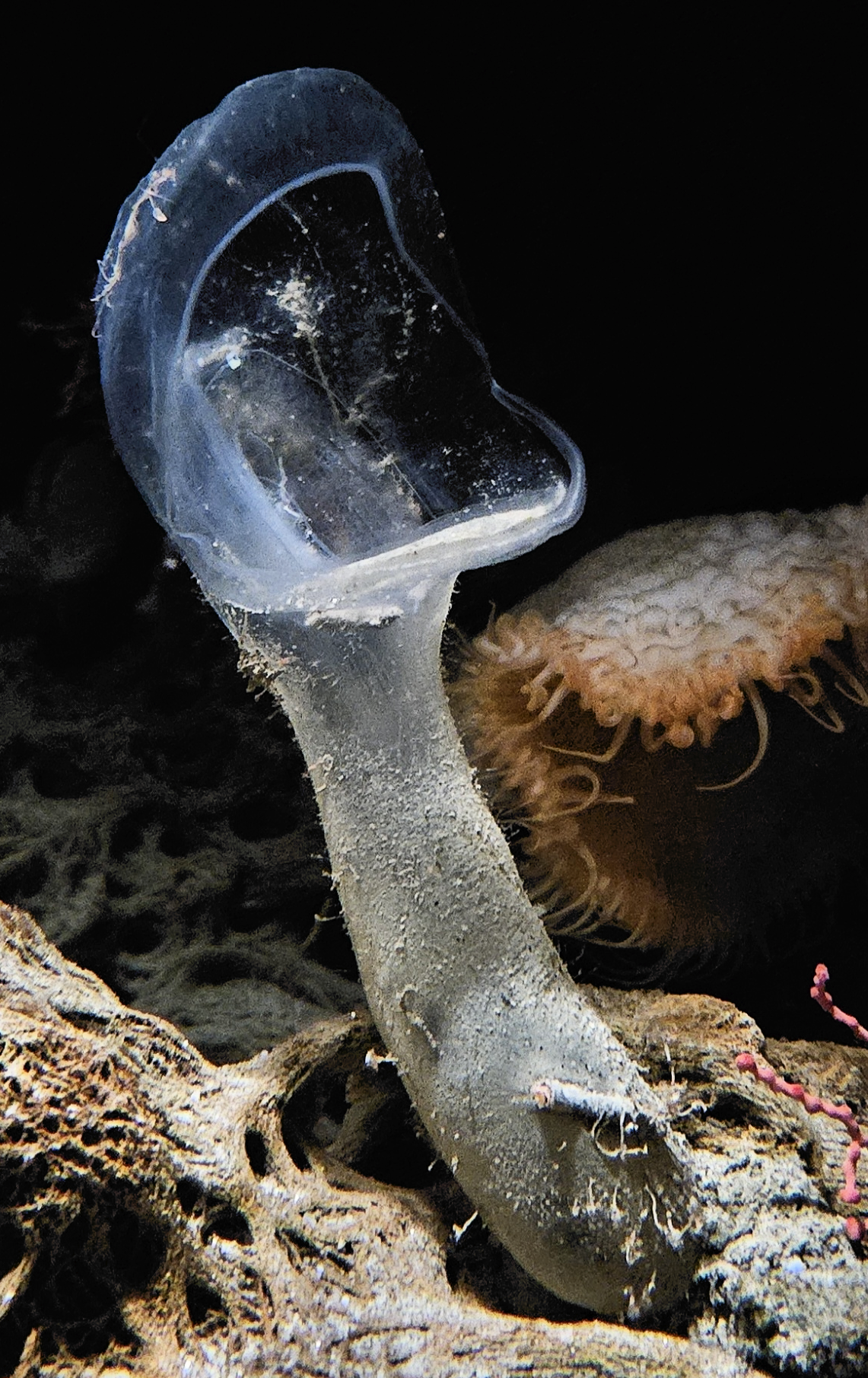
- Predatory tunicate Megalodicopia hians

Scientific classification
- Domain: Eukaryota
- Kingdom: Animalia
- Phylum: Chordata
- Subphylum: Tunicata
- Class: Ascidiacea
- Order: Phlebobranchia
- Family: Octacnemidae
- Genus: Megalodicopia
- Species: M. hians

Binomial name
- Megalodicopia hians Oka, 1918

= Predatory tunicate =

Species of marine filter feeder

The predatory tunicate (Megalodicopia hians), also known as the ghostfish, is a species of tunicate which lives anchored along deep-sea canyon walls and the seafloor. It is unique among tunicates in that, rather than being a filter feeder, it has adapted to life as an ambush predator. Its mouth-like siphon is quick to close whenever a small animal such as a crustacean or a fish drifts inside. Once the predatory tunicate catches a meal, it keeps its trap shut until the animal inside is digested. They are known to live in the Monterey Canyon at depths of 200–1,000 metres (660–3,280 ft). They mostly feed on zooplankton and other tiny animals. Their bodies are roughly 5 inches (13 cm) across.

Predatory tunicates are hermaphrodites, producing both eggs and sperm, which drift into the water. If there are no other tunicates nearby, they can self-fertilize their eggs.

== Taxonomy ==
The predatory tunicate belongs to the family Octacnemidae, which is a group of deep-sea ascidians. Thanks to the hypertrophied oral siphon, two larger lips have formed to be able to catch prey.

Octacnemidae have been suspected to share phylogenetic relations with the families Cionidae and/or Corellidae due to the similarities in their morphology.

== Distribution ==
Megalodicopia hians can be found sparsely to depths of about 3,800 m (12,500 ft) through the Monterey Canyon system. Their abundance tended to be the greatest in the oxygen-minimum zone, which is 400–800 m (1,300–2,600 ft) down.
