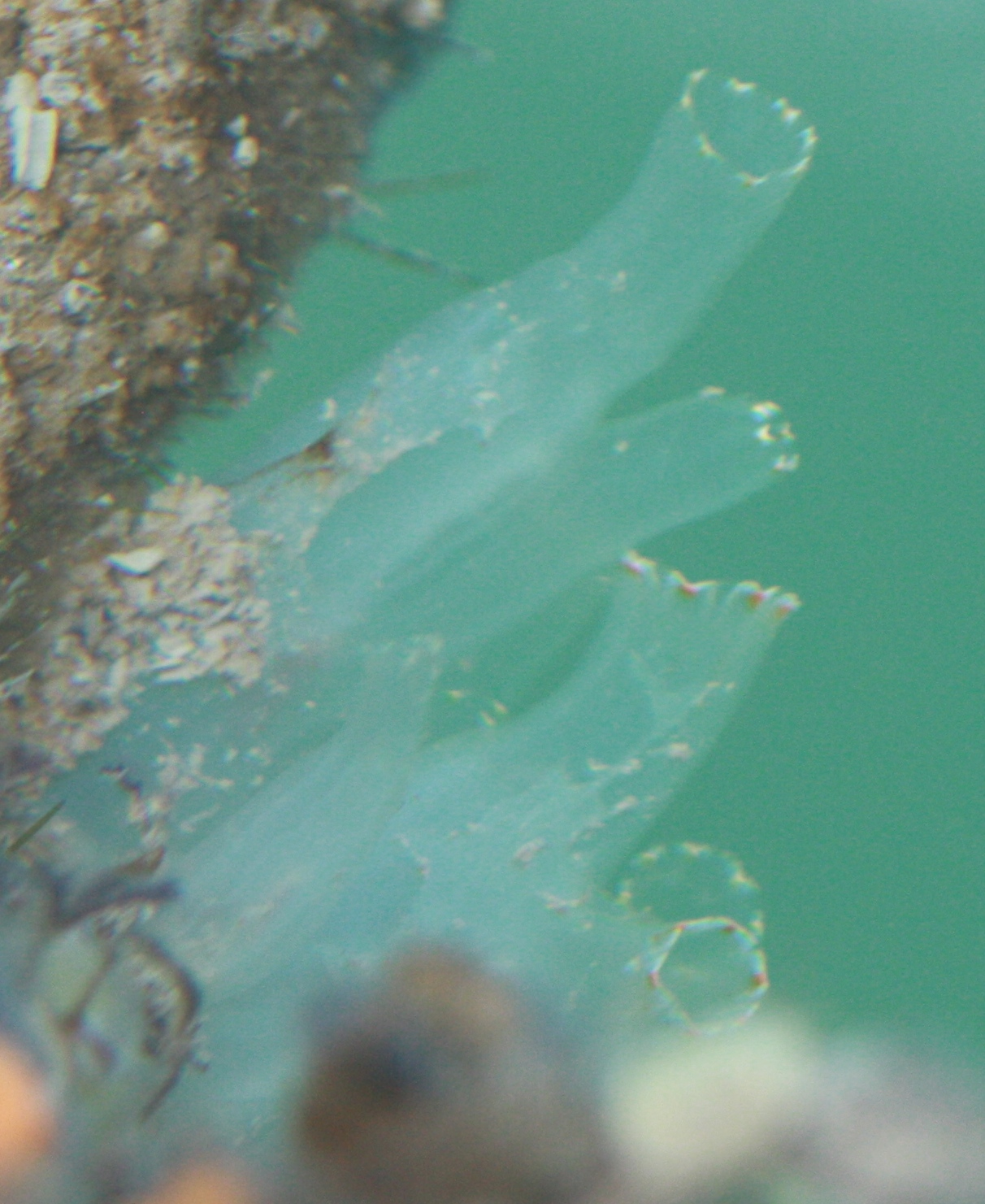

Scientific classification
- Kingdom: Animalia
- Phylum: Chordata
- Subphylum: Tunicata
- Class: Ascidiacea
- Order: Phlebobranchia
- Family: Cionidae
- Genus: Ciona
- Species: C. savignyi

Binomial name
- Ciona savignyi Herdman, 1882

Synonyms
- Ciona aspera Herdman, 1886

= Ciona savignyi =

Species of sea squirt

Ciona savignyi is a marine animal sometimes known as the Pacific transparent sea squirt or solitary sea squirt. It is a species of tunicates in the family Cionidae. It is found in shallow waters around Japan and has spread to the west coast of North America where it is regarded as an invasive species.

== Description ==
Ciona savignyi is a solitary, bottle or vase-shaped tunicate growing to a length of about 15 cm (6 in). It is usually broader near the base and this part is permanently attached to a hard surface. The outer covering or tunic is soft and gelatinous, translucent, whitish or cream-coloured. The muscle bands and internal organs can often be seen through the tunic. At the narrower, free end, there is a buccal siphon through which water is drawn into the animal. This opening is rimmed by eight yellow-edged lobes each with an orange-red spot. At the side, not far from the buccal siphon, there is an atrial siphon out of which water is pumped. This has six similar yellow lobes with red spots. Five to seven muscle bands run longitudinally along the tunic and the siphons can be retracted when danger threatens. This species can be mistaken for the very similar Ciona intestinalis but Ciona savignyi has white flecks in the tunic wall which C. intestinalis lacks. Nor does C. intestinalis have any reddish colour associated with its buccal siphon.

== Distribution ==
Ciona savignyi is native to Japan, and possibly also to Alaska and British Columbia. In 1985 it was recorded at Long Beach Harbor in California and since then it has spread to a number of other locations in the state. By 1998 it had also been reported in Puget Sound and the San Juan Islands. It favours docks, pilings, marinas, harbours and aquaculture structures and is thought to have spread in ballast water or via the hulls of ships. It is regarded as an invasive species in the United States.

The first record of the species in the southern hemisphere came from Nelson, New Zealand in April 2010. Since then it has been found in port and harbor areas in New Zealand, and in Hobart, Australia in 2017. While its environmental impact is unclear, the species is able to form dense patches which inevitably compete with native species for planktonic food.

== Biology ==
Ciona savignyi is a filter feeder. The water drawn in through the buccal siphon passes through a mucus net where planktonic particles are caught. Periodically, this is rolled up and swallowed and a new net is secreted. The water is expelled through the atrial siphon.

Like other tunicates, Ciona savignyi is a hermaphrodite. The male and female gonads do not ripen simultaneously so it does not normally self-fertilise. Gametes are released into the sea and after fertilisation, the eggs hatch into tadpole-like larvae. After a few days of development these attach themselves to a firm surface and undergo metamorphosis into juvenile tunicates.

Ciona savignyi has one of the highest known levels of genetic diversity of any species.

Ciona savignyi is highly self-fertile. However, non-self sperm outcompete self-sperm in fertilization competition assays. Gamete recognition is not absolute allowing some self-fertilization. It was speculated that self-incompatibility evolved to avoid inbreeding depression, but that selfing ability was retained to allow reproduction at low population density.
