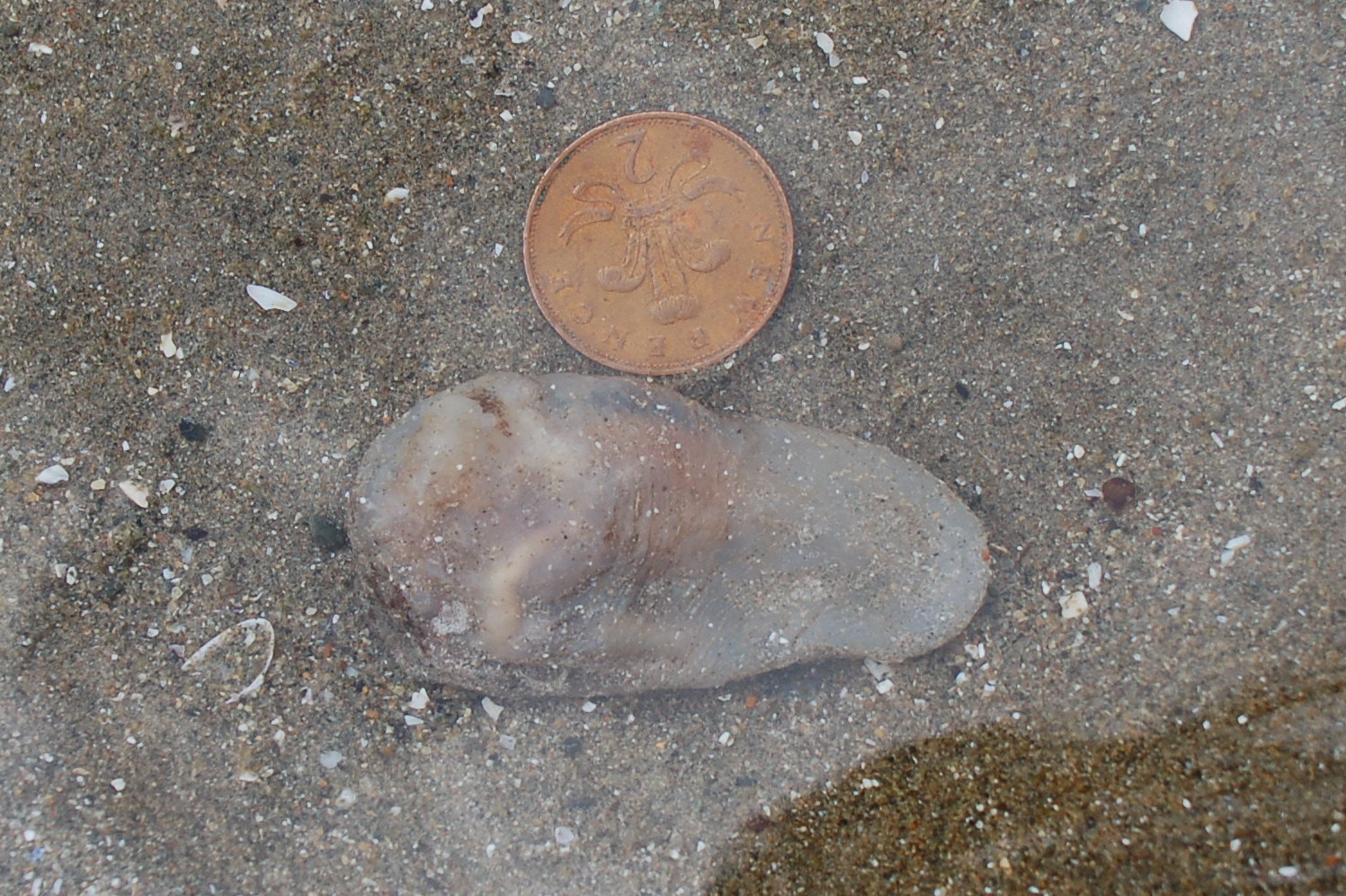
- Ascidiella aspersa habitus

Conservation status
- Secure (NatureServe)

Scientific classification
- Kingdom: Animalia
- Phylum: Chordata
- Subphylum: Tunicata
- Class: Ascidiacea
- Order: Phlebobranchia
- Family: Ascidiidae
- Genus: Ascidiella
- Species: A. aspersa

Binomial name
- Ascidiella aspersa (Müller, 1776)

Synonyms
- Species synonymy: Ascidia aculeata Alder, 1863; Ascidia affinis Hancock, 1870; Ascidia albida Alder & Hancock, 1848; Ascidia aspersa Mueller, 1776; Ascidia cristata Risso, 1826; Ascidia elliptica Alder & Hancock, 1848; Ascidia expansa Kiaer, 1893; Ascidia minuta Kiaer, 1893; Ascidia normanni Alder & Hancock, 1870; Ascidia opalina Macgillivray, 1843; Ascidia patula Mueller, 1776; Ascidia pedunculata Hoffman, 1829; Ascidia pellucida Alder & Hancock, 1848; Ascidia pustulosa Alder, 1863; Ascidia scabra Mueller, 1776; Ascidia sordida Alder & Hancock, 1848; Ascidia triangularis Herdman, 1881; Ascidia truncata Herdman, 1881; Ascidiella cristata (Risso, 1826); Ascidiella pellucida (Alder & Hancock, 1848); Phallusia aspersa (Mueller, 1776); Phallusia cristata (Risso, 1826); Phallusia patula (Mueller, 1776)

= Ascidiella aspersa =

Species of sea squirt

Ascidiella aspersa, the European sea squirt, is a species of solitary sea squirts native to the northeastern Atlantic, from the Mediterranean Sea to Norway. They possess oval bodies up to 50 to 130 mm (2.0 to 5.1 in) in length. Their branchial (or oral) siphons are conical and positioned at the top of the body. They possess six to eight lobes. The atrial siphons are located at the upper third of the side of the body and possess six lobes. The body is covered by a firm transparent test that is greyish to brown in color. The test often snag detritus that remain loosely attached to the animal. When expanded, at most 40 tentacles can be observed on the inside surface of the branchial wall. Both the openings of the branchial and atrial siphons possess lighter colored ridges on their rims. They may also be frilled at times. A. aspersa are attached to the substrates by the left side of their bodies. They can be found in dense groups of unfused individuals on hard surfaces like rocks. at depths of up to 90 m (300 ft).

Ascidiella aspersa closely resemble Ciona intestinalis, but can be distinguished by their lack of yellow markings around their siphons.
