= Adagnesia venusta =

Scientific classification
- Kingdom: Animalia
- Phylum: Chordata
- Subphylum: Tunicata
- Class: Ascidiacea
- Order: Phlebobranchia
- Family: Agneziidae
- Genus: Adagnesia
- Species: A. venusta

Binomial name
- Adagnesia venusta Kott, 1985
- Holotype site (NMV F45381) western Bass Strait)

Species of tunicate

Adagnesia venusta is a species of tunicate in the family Agneziidae, first described by Patricia Kott in 1985.

It is a benthic, marine tunicate found on fine sands along with plentiful sponges in Bass Strait.
