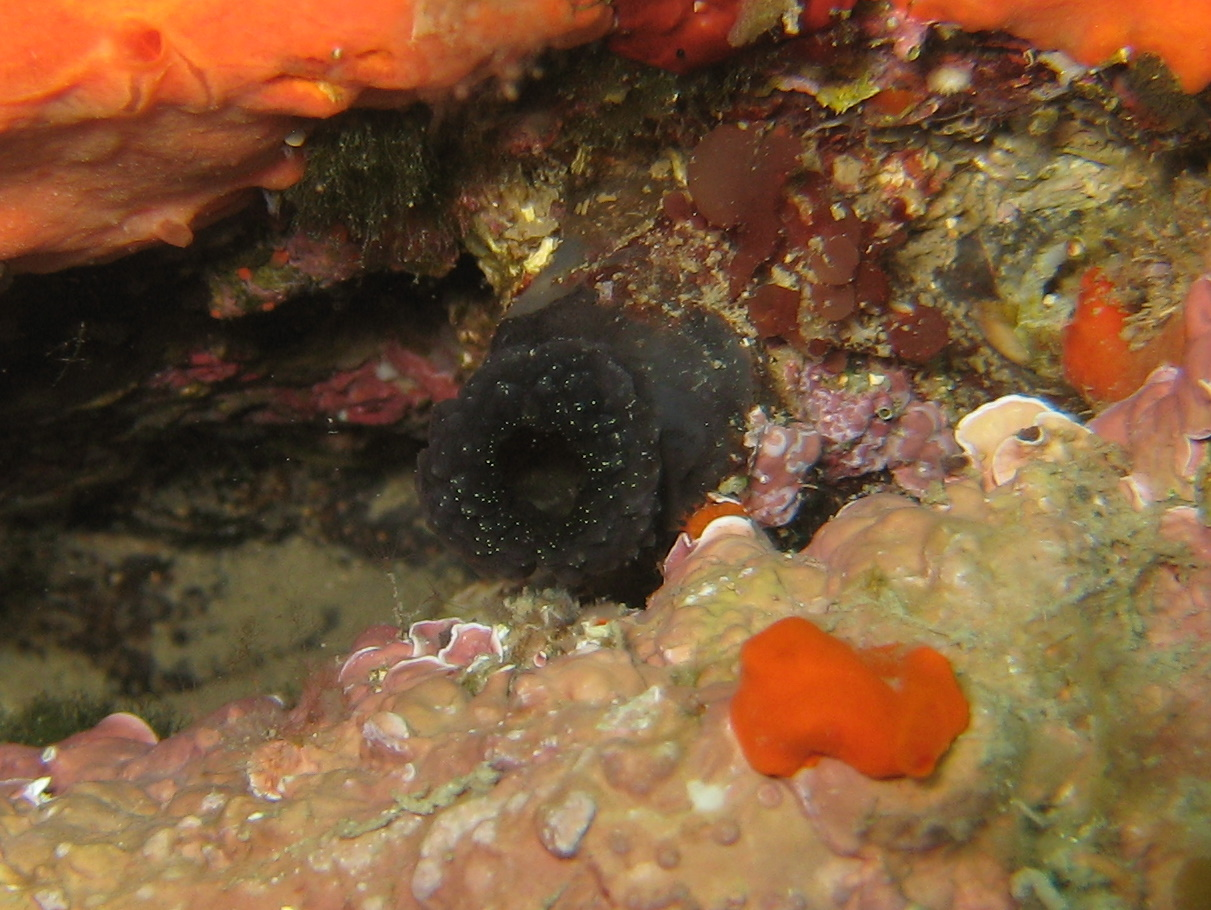

Scientific classification
- Domain: Eukaryota
- Kingdom: Animalia
- Phylum: Chordata
- Subphylum: Tunicata
- Class: Ascidiacea
- Order: Phlebobranchia
- Family: Ascidiidae
- Genus: Phallusia
- Species: P. fumigata

Binomial name
- Phallusia fumigata (Grube, 1864)

= Phallusia fumigata =

Species of sea squirt

Phallusia fumigata is a species of tunicate, a marine invertebrate in the family Ascidiidae.
