= Adagnesia opaca =

Scientific classification
- Kingdom: Animalia
- Phylum: Chordata
- Subphylum: Tunicata
- Class: Ascidiacea
- Order: Phlebobranchia
- Family: Agneziidae
- Genus: Adagnesia
- Species: A. opaca

Binomial name
- Adagnesia opaca Kott, 1963
- Paratype site (QM G4907 Toorbul Point, Moreton Bay)

Species of tunicate

Adagnesia opaca is a species of tunicate in the family Agneziidae, first described by Patricia Kott in 1963.

It is a benthic, marine animal found on sandy bottoms along the east coast shores of Australia.
