= Ascidia saccula =

Scientific classification
- Kingdom: Animalia
- Phylum: Chordata
- Subphylum: Tunicata
- Class: Ascidiacea
- Order: Phlebobranchia
- Family: Ascidiidae
- Genus: Ascidia
- Species: A. saccula

Binomial name
- Ascidia saccula Kott, 2006

Species of sea squirt

Ascidia saccula is a sea squirt in the family Ascidiidae and was first described in 2006 by Patricia Kott, from a specimen (QM G308839) collected at a depth of 6 m from a reef in the River Derwent estuary in Tasmania, Australia.
