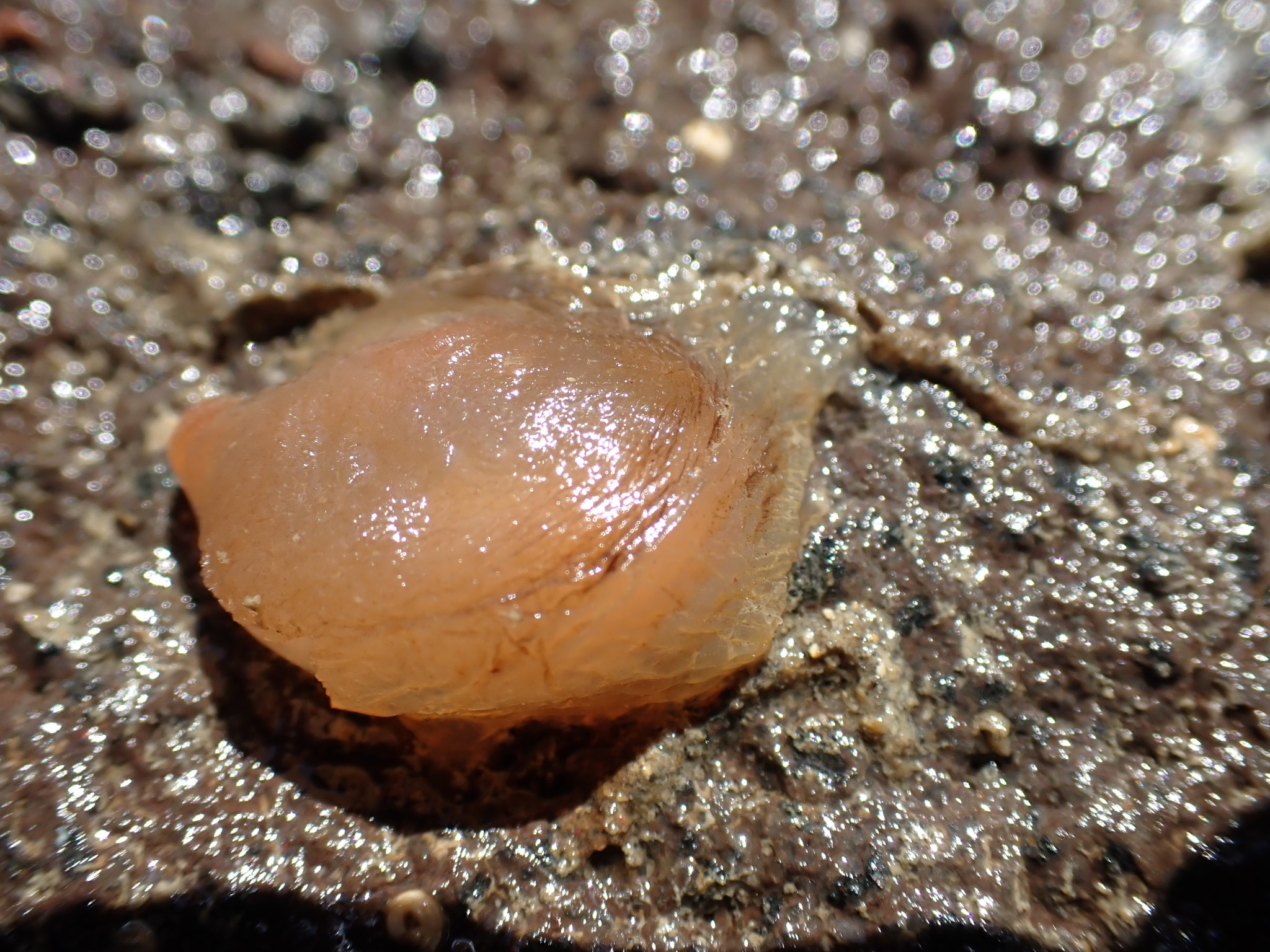

Scientific classification
- Domain: Eukaryota
- Kingdom: Animalia
- Phylum: Chordata
- Subphylum: Tunicata
- Class: Ascidiacea
- Order: Phlebobranchia
- Family: Corellidae
- Genus: Corella
- Species: C. eumyota

Binomial name
- Corella eumyota Traustedt, 1882

Synonyms
- Corella benedeni Beneden & Longchamps, 1913; Corella dohrni Beneden & Longchamps, 1913; Corella novarae Drasche, 1884

= Corella eumyota =

Species of sea squirt

Corella eumyota, the orange-tipped sea squirt, is a solitary tunicate in the family Corellidae. It is native to the Southern Ocean, the Antarctic, South America, southern Australia, New Zealand and South Africa, and has been introduced into European waters where it has become invasive.

== Description ==
In its native range in the southern hemisphere, Corella eumyota can grow to a length of about 24 cm (9 in) and is grey or ivory in colour. The tunics of large individuals are thin, transparent and papery, while smaller individuals, which are a great deal more abundant, are thicker and gelatinous. This species has been introduced into the northern hemisphere and here it is described as being 2 to 4 cm (0.8 to 1.6 in) long, semitransparent and white, brown, or orangeish, the siphons often being orange.

It is normally recumbent, lying on its right side, roughly oval in shape, but fitting its body to the contours of its surroundings. The inhalent siphon is at the tip of the body and the exhalent siphon a third of the way down the right side. The siphons cannot be retracted. Although the tunic may be clean, it is sometimes covered by a biotic film or overgrown by others of its species or other tunicates. The hind gut can be seen through the tunic and forms a simple curve, and this helps distinguish it in European waters from the fairly similar sea grapes (Molgula spp), which have an S-shaped gut.

== Distribution ==
Corella eumyota is native to the waters around Antarctica and to the southern parts of South America, South Africa, Australia and New Zealand. It has a wide distribution on the Antarctic continental shelf at depths ranging between 30 and 842 m (98 and 2,762 ft). It has been introduced into the northern hemisphere and is now present in northwestern Europe, in Spain, France, Ireland and the south coast of England.

== Ecology ==
Corella eumyota is a suspension feeder, creating a current to draw water in at one siphon, filtering out the food particles and expelling the water through the other siphon. It largely feeds on organic particles stirred up from the sediment. In its native Antarctic waters, this is a slow-growing, long-lived species. It spawns in the austral summer. The larvae are retained inside the body cavity until they are well-advanced; when they are released they settle on the seabed within a few minutes, so groups of this sea squirt are found growing quite close to each other.
