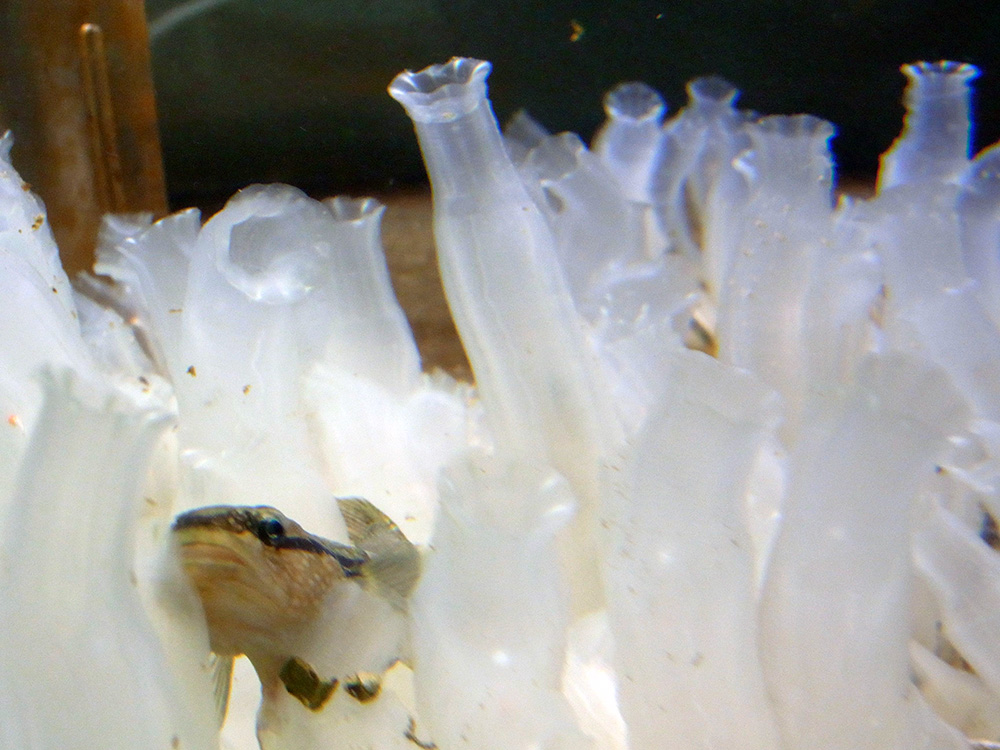

Scientific classification
- Kingdom: Animalia
- Phylum: Chordata
- Subphylum: Tunicata
- Class: Ascidiacea
- Order: Phlebobranchia
- Family: Cionidae
- Genus: Ciona
- Species: C. robusta

Binomial name
- Ciona robusta Hoshino & Tokioka, 1967

= Ciona robusta =

Species of sea squirt

Ciona robusta is a species of marine invertebrate in the genus Ciona of the family Cionidae. The holotype was collected from the northeastern coast of Honshu Island, Japan.

== Taxonomy ==
Populations of Ciona intestinalis known as C. intestinalis type A, found in the Mediterranean Sea, the Pacific Ocean, the east coast of North America, and the Atlantic coasts of South Africa, have been shown to in fact be Ciona robusta.

Ciona robusta are similar to several other tunicate species, such as C. intestinalis, C. savignyi, and Ciona Species C and D. They used to be considered C. intestinalis, but morphological, genomic, and ecological data has indicated that C. intestinalis and C. robusta are separate species, with genetic analysis indicating that they have been largely isolated for three to five million years. Ciona intestinalis has different genetics, pigmentation, the presence of a tunic, and larval morphology than Ciona robusta. Ciona savignyi is similar in appearance to Ciona robusta, but it always has white pigmented flecks or spots in the body walls, while Ciona robusta never has these. Ciona savignyi also has a more fragile tunic with much brighter yellow markings on the siphon edges rather than orange and a white rather than red dot on the vas deferens, and tends to have fewer tentacles around the oral siphon than Ciona robusta, though this tends to be variable. In Ciona robusta, the pharyngeal-epicardial opening pair is usually very small and located near its base, while in Ciona savignyi these openings are located close to the esophageal opening. The final tunicate species commonly misidentified with C. robusta are Ciona Species C and D, which are undescribed species identified by molecular means from the Mediterranean and Black Sea, respectively.

== Description ==
Ciona robusta has a translucent tunic and a white or off-white body, with orange to red dots on the scalloped edges of the siphons. The majority of the tunic is soft, flexible, and gelatinous, with the exception of the posterior end, which is tough and mostly white or yellowish-white. Muscle bands and organs can usually be seen beneath the tunic, as well as tubercles, which are most visible near siphons and scattered throughout the surface of the tunic. The tubercles are very small, and histological sectioning or 3-D imaging may be required to see all of them. The body of Ciona robusta is elongated, cylindrical, and vase-shaped, with five to seven longitudinal bands on each side, extending nearly the entire length of the body. The body is easily torn, though other species such as Ciona savignyi, are more fragile. The siphons of Ciona robusta are short and directed forward, with the oral siphon, containing eight lobes, larger than the atrial siphon, containing six lobes. Both siphons have a pale white or yellowish tinge visible, if any color at all.

Size-wise, they can reach 210 mm (8.3 in), though they usually do not grow beyond 100–120 mm (3.9–4.7 in).

Ciona robusta is a marine filter feeder (suspension feeder). To feed, they draw water in through the oral siphon, which contains gills that filter phytoplankton, bacteria, and detritus, which are their main food sources. Water is then drawn into the stomach and intestines by the mucus strings, and finally expelled by the atrial siphon. They are subtidal, though they sometimes can be found in low intertidal, and prefer a salinity of 11 to 50 ppt, though they are highly tolerant and can reproduce up to 40 ppt. They survive temperatures ranging from ten to thirty degrees Celsius, and can tolerate temperatures as low as -1 C for months at a time.

== As an invasive species ==
Ciona robusta, a highly invasive tunicate, has been found in many regions throughout the world. Based on data that has been found thus far, the Pacific Northwest is the assigned native region of C. robusta. It was first collected in Australia in 1878, then on the west coast of North America in 1897, and in several other countries and continents through 2002. C. robusta is widespread throughout the world, but mainly stays in harbors in the warmer parts of the world, unlike its common counterpart C. intestinalis that prefers cooler regions. Their tolerance of varied conditions leads them to be invasive, and they are widespread, having invaded the West Coast of North America, Hawaii, Australia, New Zealand, South America (on both coasts), South Africa and Europe. They tend to be found in both protected harbors and natural substrates, with areas such as docks, boat hulls, buoys, ropes, pilings, rocks, shells, aquaculture gear, and boulders being common habitats for them. Being a fouling organism, they can have a negative economic impact on aquaculture operations through fouling equipment and reducing the growth of cultured shellfish. Their consumers include fish and crabs; however, this predation seems to happen more on rocky habitats, which leads to them becoming rarer or absent in rocky habitats, instead populating areas that have fewer predators.

In North America, C. robusta seems to have spread to harbors with more boat traffic, including San Francisco Bay, Los Angeles-Long Beach, and Newport Bay. It then made its way to spread through the smaller ports, including Mission and Morro Bays, along with others throughout the West Coast. While there are records of C. robusta going north of Humboldt Bay, they are historical, and the current northern range edge of the species is unknown.

Going across the Atlantic Ocean, C. robusta was collected in Egyptian waters sometime in the early 1800s and was found to be widespread throughout the Mediterranean Sea by the late 1800s. The specimens collected and recorded were not confirmed by molecular evidence, but rather only by descriptions left by Hoshino and Nishikawa (1985). On the Atlantic coast of Europe, C. robusta has been found to coexist with C. intestinalis in Plymouth Harbor and Brittany, France; however, the distribution of C. robusta in this region is very specific to certain locations and is more spread out compared to the range of C. intestinalis in the same region.

In South Africa, C. robusta was reported to be present in Durban on the Indian Ocean in 1955. It was then later reported on the Atlantic side in Saldanha Bay in 1962, followed by other South African ports by 2001. While C. robusta has not been confirmed in all locations, it was confirmed to be C. robusta from populations in Cape Town in South Africa.

In South America, species have been found in Mar del Plata, Argentina (1945); San Antonio Este (2005); Puerto Madryn (2005), and occasionally between Santos and Rio de Janeiro. However, molecular confirmations need to be made to solidify this evidence of C. robusta invasion of South American waters.

In the Pacific Ocean, C. robusta was first reported in Port Jackson in Sydney, New South Wales in 1878 and later found at many ports throughout the southern coast of Australia. In New Zealand, C. intestinalis was first reported in 1950 in the Lyttleon, Napier and Nelson harbors, which are mainly on the eastern side of New Zealand. There were, however, specimens in Nelson harbor that were identified by molecular genetics to be C. robusta. While there have also been reports of tunicate populations in Chile and along the Peruvian border, there have not been any molecular identifications to confirm the populations as being C. robusta.

Overall, there has been a significant amount of research done on the invasiveness of the species C. robusta. However, there is a lack of a large amount of confirming molecular genetics information on this species and the closeness they have to C. intestinalis. More information should be collected that is based on molecular genetics in the future, so as to more fully understand the invasive habits of C. robusta.
