= Ascidia caudata =

Scientific classification
- Domain: Eukaryota
- Kingdom: Animalia
- Phylum: Chordata
- Subphylum: Tunicata
- Class: Ascidiacea
- Order: Phlebobranchia
- Family: Ascidiidae
- Genus: Ascidia
- Species: A. caudata

Binomial name
- Ascidia caudata Heller, 1878

Species of sea squirt

Ascidia caudata is a sea squirt in the family Ascidiidae and was first described in 1878 by Camill Heller.
