= Adagnesia antarctica =

Scientific classification
- Kingdom: Animalia
- Phylum: Chordata
- Subphylum: Tunicata
- Class: Ascidiacea
- Order: Phlebobranchia
- Family: Agneziidae
- Genus: Adagnesia
- Species: A. antarctica

Binomial name
- Adagnesia antarctica Kott, 1969
- Holotype site ( USNM 11966 Macquarie Island)

Species of tunicate

Adagnesia antarctica is a species of tunicate in the family Agneziidae, first described by Patricia Kott in 1969.

It occurs in the waters off Macquarie Island.
