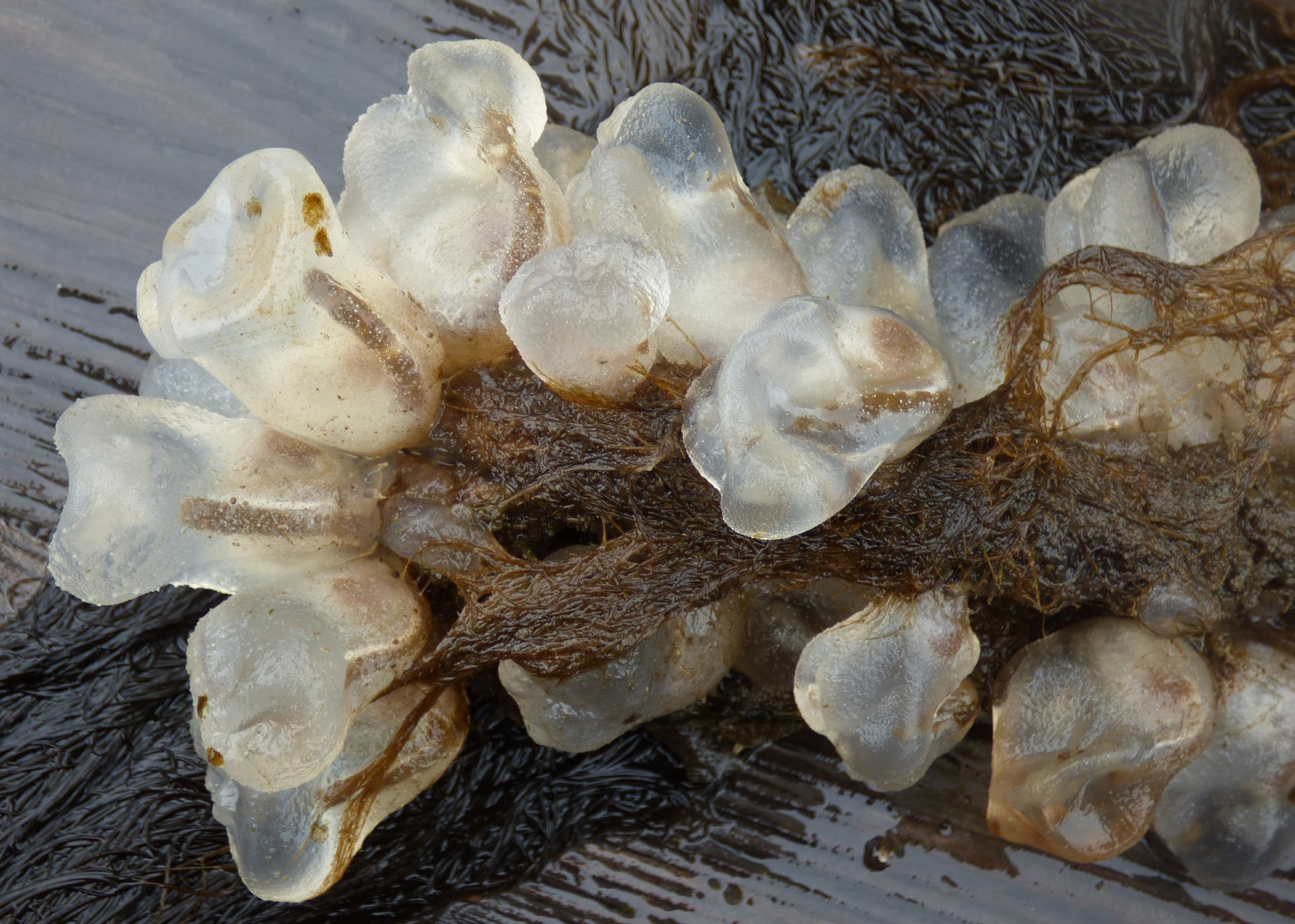

Scientific classification
- Domain: Eukaryota
- Kingdom: Animalia
- Phylum: Chordata
- Subphylum: Tunicata
- Class: Ascidiacea
- Order: Phlebobranchia
- Family: Corellidae
- Genus: Corella
- Species: C. willmeriana

Binomial name
- Corella willmeriana Herdman, 1898

= Corella willmeriana =

Species of sea squirt

Corella willmeriana is a solitary tunicate in the family Corellidae. It is native to the eastern Pacific Ocean where it lives on the seabed at depths down to about 75 m (250 ft) between Alaska and California.

== Description ==
Solitary, sessile tunicate. Incurrent and excurrent siphons directed upwards, away from substratum. Without dorsal nerve cord as adult.

== Identification ==
Solitary ascidians (not reproducing by budding), but not embedded in a common tunic. Individual is usually more than 1 cm in diameter. Tunic transparent or translucent. Attached to a firm substratum. Body is taller than wide. Oral and atrial siphons about the same length. Tunic smooth or irregularly wrinkled. Body not much taller than wide; tunic transparent and colorless; longitudinal muscle bands not obvious beneath the tunic; oral and atrial apertures not borne on distinct siphons. Rectum more than three-fourths the height of the body; atrium not expanded into a pocket in which embryos are brooded.

== Reproduction and development ==
Hermaphroditic; Corella willmeriana breeds throughout the year. The eggs are fertilized in the atrial chamber, where they develop into the free-swimming tadpole stage before released. Swimming larvae remain juveniles for <2 days before anterior adhesive organs allow for attachment to substratum. This triggers metamorphism, which entails enlargement of pharynx for filter feeding; the notochord is sucked back into body and is no longer present in adult form.

== Predation and other threats ==
Eurylepta leoparda, a cotylean polyclad flatworm, rolls up into a tube and enters C. willmeriana through the oral aperture. It unrolls itself and ingests the branchial basket. It then either leaves the individual through a siphon or continues to feed on the remainder of the internal organs. Other flatworms and polychaetes have been found to eat C. willmeriana. Very young C. willmeriana are frequently overgrown during the winter by colonial ascidian Diplosoma madconaldi. Diatom blooms in springtime sometimes smother adult C. willmeriana.

== Range and ecology ==
Pacific Ocean from southern Alaska to southern California. Subtidal to 75 m. Often found in fouling communities. It is a primary colonizer, as the tadpoles have demonstrated preference to settle on clean, unfouled surfaces.

== Synonyms ==
Transparent tunicate, transparent sea squirt, solitary tunicate.

== Literature cited ==
Kozloff, Eugene N. Marine Invertebrates of the Pacific Northwest. Seattle WA: University of Washington Press, 1987, 1996.

Lamb, Andy & Hanby, Bernard P. Marine Life of the Pacific Northwest. Madeira Park, B.C.: Harbour Publishing, 2005.

Lambert, Gretchen. “The General Ecology and Growth of a Solitary Ascidian, Corella willmeriana”. Seattle, WA: University of Washington Zoology Department, from a thesis submitted in partial fulfillment of the requirements for the M.S. degree, 1967.
