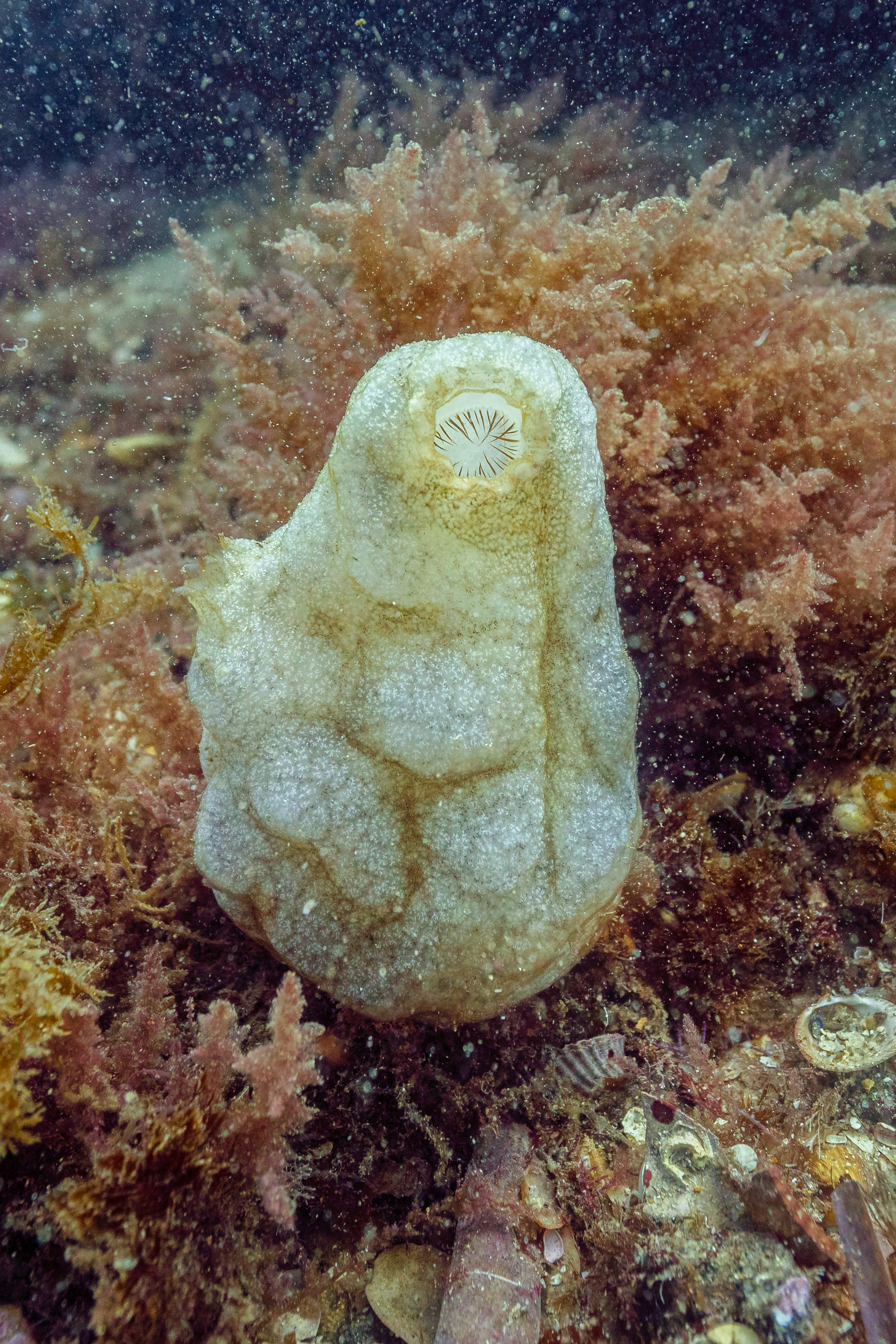

Scientific classification
- Domain: Eukaryota
- Kingdom: Animalia
- Phylum: Chordata
- Subphylum: Tunicata
- Class: Ascidiacea
- Order: Phlebobranchia
- Family: Ascidiidae
- Genus: Phallusia
- Species: P. mammillata

Binomial name
- Phallusia mammillata (Cuvier, 1815)

Synonyms
- Ascidia mammillata Cuvier, 1815

= Phallusia mammillata =

Species of sea squirt

Phallusia mammillata is a solitary marine tunicate of the ascidian class found in the eastern Atlantic Ocean and the Mediterranean Sea.

== Description ==
Phallusia mammillata is a solitary species of ascidian and can grow to a height of about 20 cm (8 in). The tunic is a translucent, bluish-white colour and is covered with irregular rounded lobes or mounds.

== Distribution ==
This tunicate is found on rocky, sandy or muddy substrates in the northeastern Atlantic Ocean, the North Sea, the English Channel and the Mediterranean Sea to depths of about 200 m (656 ft).

== Biology ==
Like all tunicates, Phallusia mammillata has a thick leathery tunic containing a cellulosic material. The tunic encloses a sac-shaped cavity with separate siphons through which water is drawn in and expelled. The animal feeds on the planktonic particles that it filters from the incoming seawater by passing it through a mucous net.

Phallusia mammillata is one of a small number of ascidians that accumulate the element vanadium in their blood cells. It is unclear why the tunicate should do this, but concentrations of up to 350 mM have been found, some ten million times higher than in the surrounding seawater. The ascidian has at least ten different types of blood cell, and the vanadium-accumulating cells have been shown to be "vacuolated and granular amoebocytes, signet ring cells and type-II compartment cells".

Each P. mammillata individual is a hermaphrodite. Eggs are released through the exhalent siphon and external fertilization in the water column takes place. The eggs hatch into free-swimming, tadpole-like larvae, which within a few days settle on the seabed and undergo metamorphosis into juveniles.
