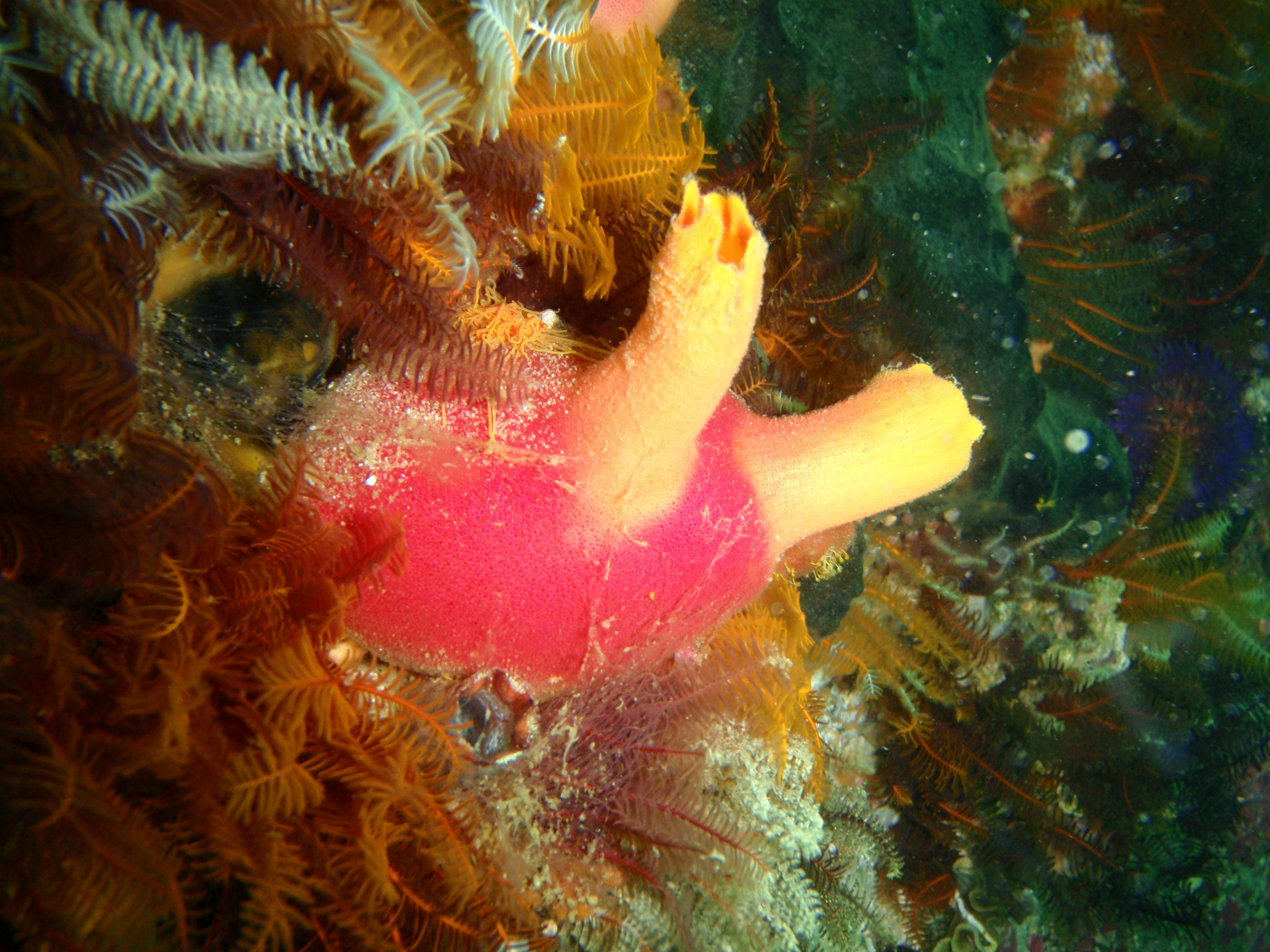

Scientific classification
- Kingdom: Animalia
- Phylum: Chordata
- Subphylum: Tunicata
- Class: Ascidiacea
- Order: Phlebobranchia
- Family: Ascidiidae
- Genus: Ascidia
- Species: A. incrassata

Binomial name
- Ascidia incrassata Heller, 1878

= Ascidia incrassata =

Red spotted Ascidian

Ascidia incrassata is a sea squirt in the family Ascidiidae and was first described in 1878 by Camill Heller.

This species has been found off the southern coasts of South Africa
