= Ciona intestinalis protein database =

Content
- Description: repository of large-scale omics data, bioinformatic analyses and curated annotation
- Organisms: Ciona intestinalis

Contact
- Research center: Hokkaido University, Sapporo, Japan
- Laboratory: Graduate School of Information Science and Technology,
- Authors: Toshinori Endo
- Primary citation: Endo & al. (2011)
- Release date: 2010

Access
- Website: http://cipro.ibio.jp/2.5

Miscellaneous
- Version: 2.5

The Ciona intestinalis protein database (CIPRO) is a protein database for the tunicate species C. intestinalis.

== See also ==
- Ciona intestinalis
