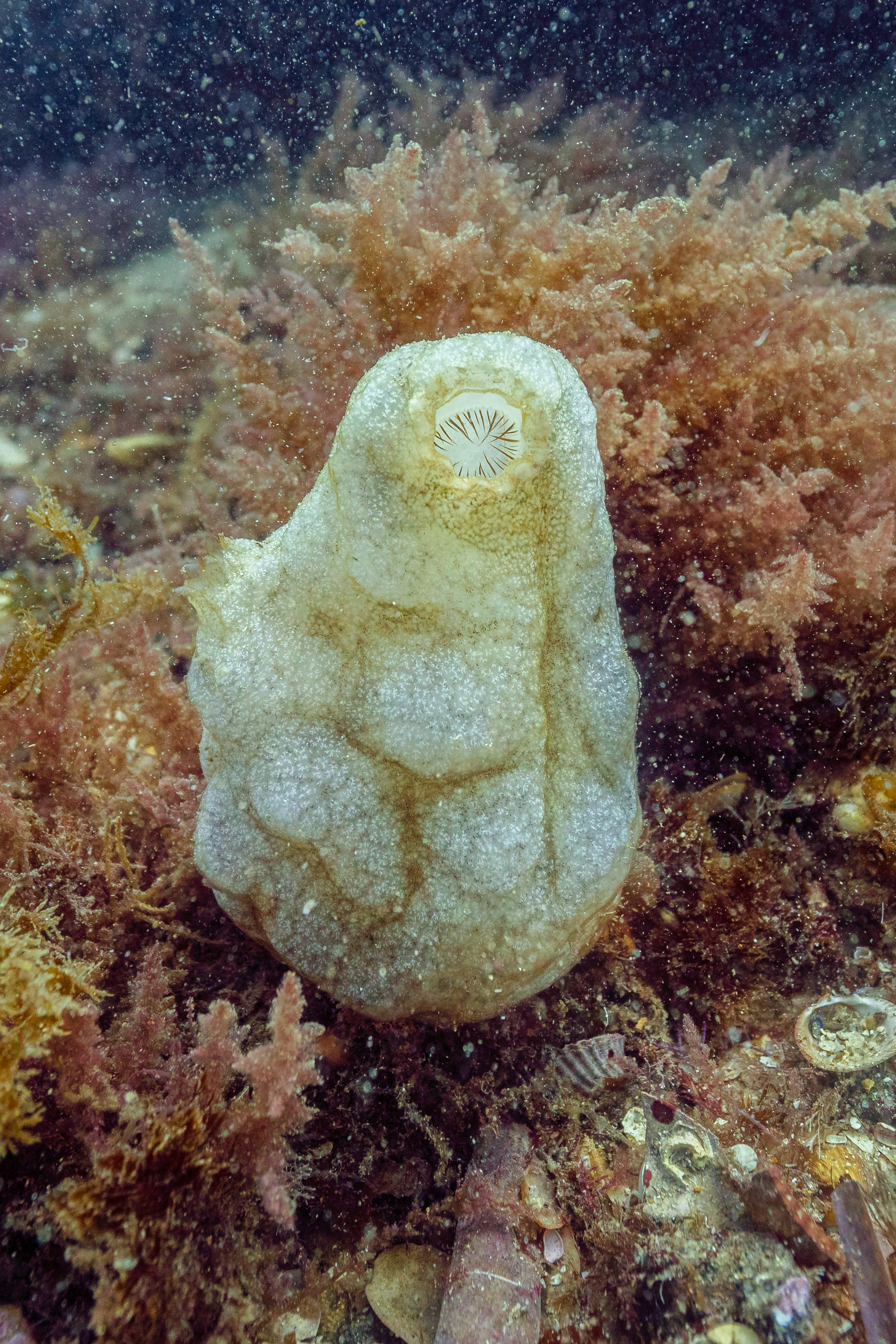
- Phallusia mammillata

Scientific classification
- Domain: Eukaryota
- Kingdom: Animalia
- Phylum: Chordata
- Subphylum: Tunicata
- Class: Ascidiacea
- Order: Phlebobranchia
- Family: Ascidiidae
- Genus: Phallusia; Savigny, 1816

= Phallusia =

Genus of sea squirts

Phallusia is a genus of tunicates of the family Ascidiidae, which includes the following species:

- Phallusia aperta (Sluiter, 1904)
- Phallusia arabica Savigny, 1816
- Phallusia barbarica Kott, 1985
- Phallusia colleta (C. Monniot & F. Monniot, 1970)
- Phallusia depressiuscula (Heller, 1878)
- Phallusia fragilis Bonnet & Rocha, 2011
- Phallusia fumigata (Grube, 1864)
- Phallusia ingeria Traustedt, 1883
- Phallusia julinea Sluiter, 1915
- Phallusia koreana Traustedt, 1885
- Phallusia kottae (Monniot & Monniot, 1996)
- Phallusia mammillata (Cuvier, 1815)
- Phallusia millari Kott, 1985
- Phallusia nigra Savigny, 1816
- Phallusia obesa (Herdman, 1880)
- Phallusia philippinensis Millar, 1975
- Phallusia polytrema (Herdman, 1906)
- Phallusia recifensis (Millar, 1977)
- Phallusia suensonii Traustedt, 1885

== Gallery ==
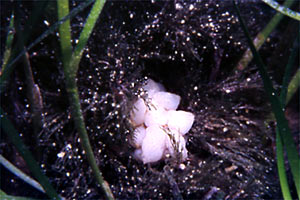
P. mamillata

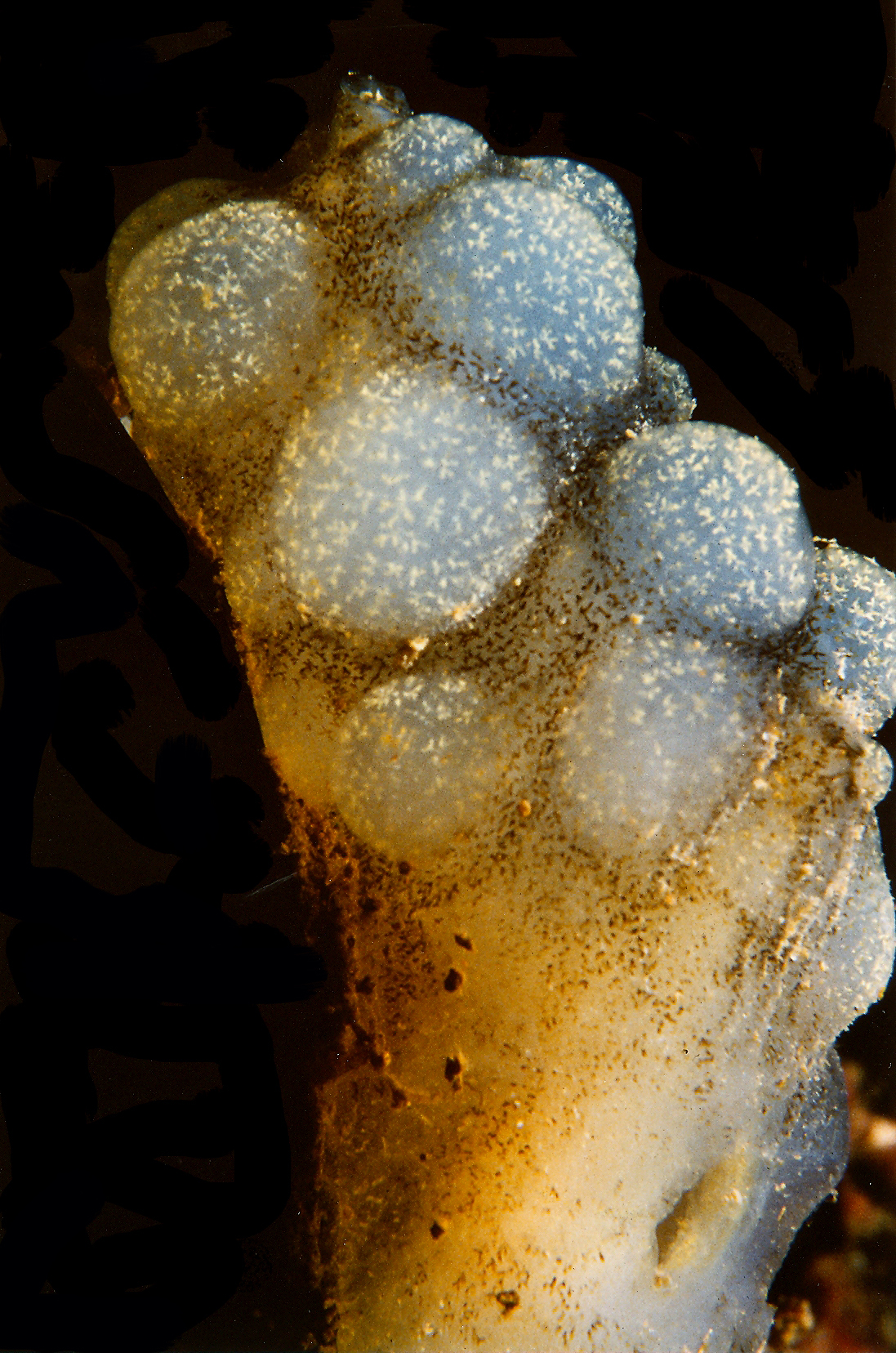
P. mamillata

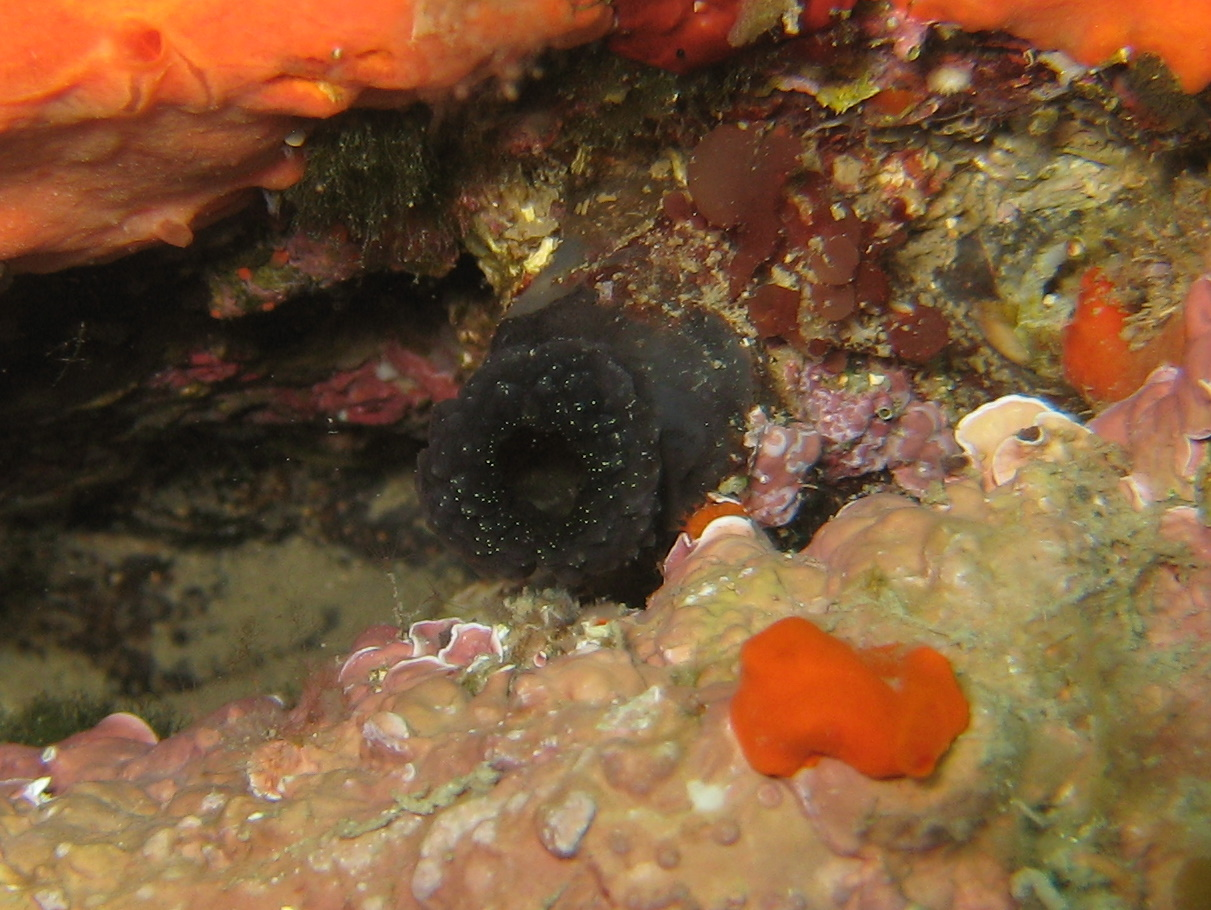
P. fumigata
