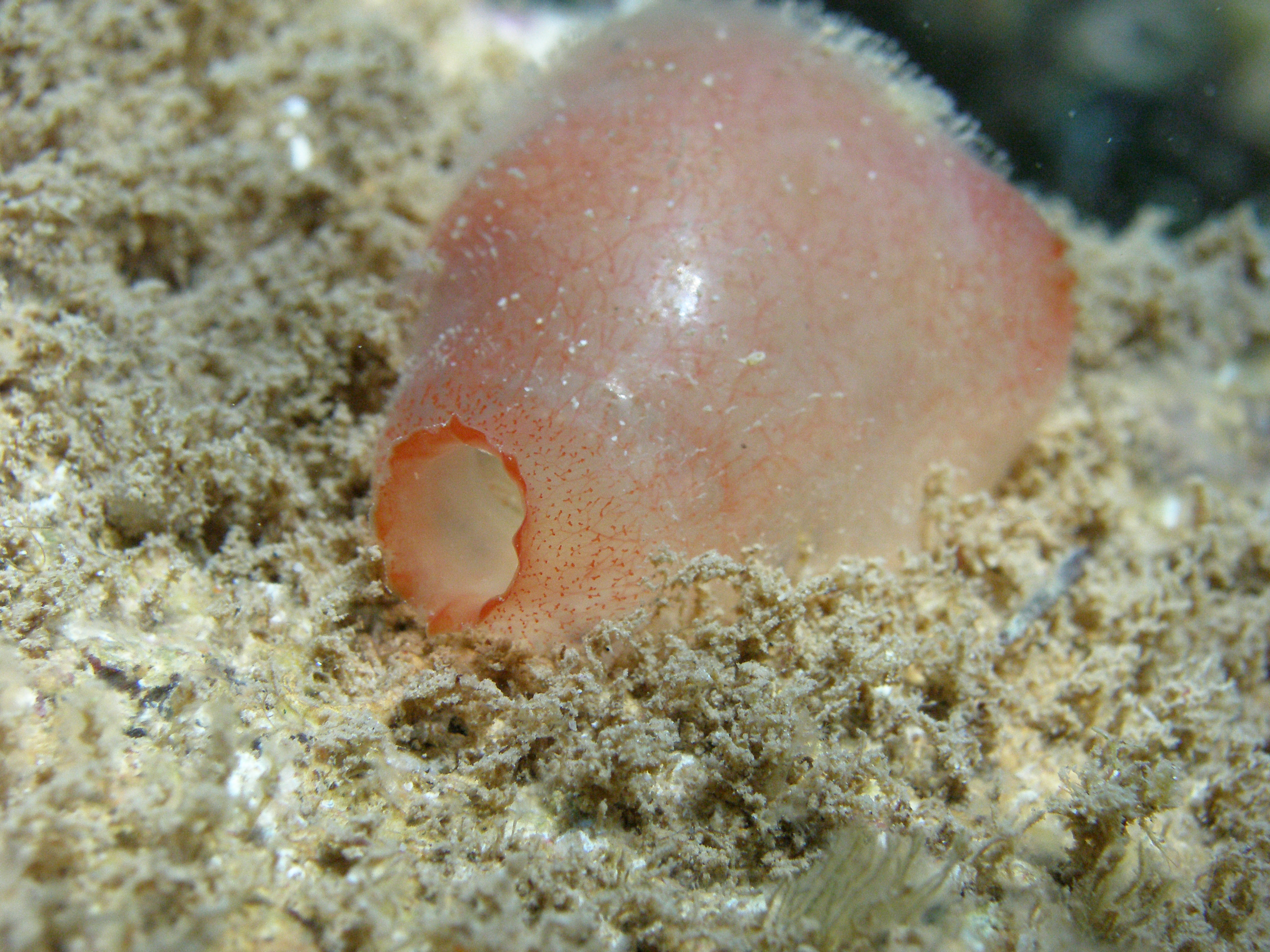

Scientific classification
- Kingdom: Animalia
- Phylum: Chordata
- Subphylum: Tunicata
- Class: Ascidiacea
- Order: Phlebobranchia
- Family: Ascidiidae
- Genus: Ascidia; Linnaeus, 1767

Synonyms
- Ascidea Linnaeus, 1767 (spelling variation); Ascidie Linnaeus, 1767 (spelling variation); Ascidiopsis Verrill, 1872; Bathyascidia Hartmeyer, 1901; Phallusioides Huntsman, 1912; Tunica

= Ascidia =

Genus of sea squirts

Ascidia is a genus of tunicates in the family Ascidiidae.

== Selected species ==
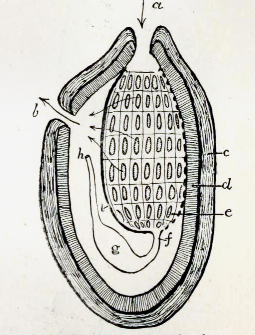
Diagrammatic section of an Ascidia, representing the three sacs and the branchial sac as the pharynx or throat: (a) branchial orifice; (b) atrial orifice; (c) tunic or test (d) mantle; (e) branchial sac; (f) gullet; (g) stomach; (h) anal orifice; (i) dorsal lamina; the dotted line indicates the endostyle.

- Ascidia achimotae Millar, 1953
- Ascidia adamanensis Oka, 1915
- Ascidia ahodori Oka, 1927
- Ascidia alisea Monniot & Monniot, 2006
- Ascidia alpha Tokioka, 1953
- Ascidia alterna Monniot & Monniot, 1991
- Ascidia archaia Sluiter, 1890
- Ascidia arenosa Hartmeyer, 1898
- Ascidia armata Hartmeyer, 1906
- Ascidia aspera Brunetti, 2007
- Ascidia austera Sluiter, 1904
- Ascidia aximensis Millar, 1953
- Ascidia azurea Monniot & Monniot, 1996
- Ascidia bathybia Hartmeyer, 1922
- Ascidia bifissa Sluiter, 1895
- Ascidia bocatorensis Bonnet & Rocha, 2011
- Ascidia caguayensis Millar & Goodbody, 1974
- Ascidia callosa Stimpson, 1852
- Ascidia canaliculata Heller, 1878
- Ascidia cannelata Oken, 1820
- Ascidia capillata Sluiter, 1887
- Ascidia caudata Heller, 1878
- Ascidia celtica C. Monniot, 1969
- Ascidia ceratodes (Huntsman, 1912)
- Ascidia challengeri Herdman, 1882
- Ascidia citrina Nishikawa & Tokioka, 1975
- Ascidia clementea Ritter, 1907
- Ascidia collini Bonnet & Rocha, 2011
- Ascidia columbiana (Huntsman, 1912)
- Ascidia conchilega Muller, 1776
- Ascidia conifera (Hartmeyer, 1911)
- Ascidia corallicola Bonnet & Rocha, 2011
- Ascidia correi C. Monniot, 1970
- Ascidia curvata (Traustedt, 1882)
- Ascidia decepta Kott, 1985
- Ascidia depressiuscula Heller, 1878
- Ascidia despecta Herdman, 1880
- Ascidia dijmphniana Templeton, 1834
- Ascidia dorsata Meenakshi & Renganathan, 1999
- Ascidia empheres Sluiter, 1895
- Ascidia escabanae Monniot, 1998
- Ascidia fictile Monniot, 1997
- Ascidia fistulosa Monniot & Monniot, 1967
- Ascidia formella Monniot, 1998
- Ascidia fusca Monniot & Monniot, 1989
- Ascidia gamma Tokioka, 1954
- Ascidia gemmata Sluiter, 1895
- Ascidia glabra Hartmeyer, 1922
- Ascidia hyalina Oka, 1915
- Ascidia iberica C. Monniot & F. Monniot, 1988
- Ascidia incrassata Heller, 1878
- Ascidia interrupta Heller, 1878
- Ascidia involuta Heller, 1875
- Ascidia irregularis Oka, 1915
- Ascidia kreagra Sluiter, 1895
- Ascidia krechi Michaelsen, 1904
- Ascidia kuneides Sluiter, 1887
- Ascidia lagena Michaelsen, 1922
- Ascidia latesiphonica Hartmeyer, 1922
- Ascidia liberata Sluiter, 1887
- Ascidia limpida Sluiter, 1904
- Ascidia longistriata Hartmeyer, 1906
- Ascidia macropapilla Millar, 1982
- Ascidia malaca (Traustedt, 1883)
- Ascidia matoya Tokioka, 1949
- Ascidia mediterranea Pérès, 1959
- Ascidia melanostoma Sluiter, 1885
- Ascidia mentula Müller, 1776
- Ascidia meridionalis Herdman, 1880
- Ascidia molguloides C. Monniot, 1975
- Ascidia monnioti Bonnet & Rocha, 2011
- Ascidia multitentaculata (Hartmeyer, 1912)
- Ascidia munda Sluiter, 1897
- Ascidia muricata Heller, 1874
- Ascidia nerea Kott, 1985
- Ascidia nordestina Bonnet & Rocha, 2011
- Ascidia nuda Nishikawa, 1986
- Ascidia obliqua Alder, 1863
- Ascidia obocki Sluiter, 1905
- Ascidia occidentalis Kott, 1985
- Ascidia ornata Monniot & Monniot, 2001
- Ascidia pacifica Tokioka, 1967
- Ascidia panamensis Bonnet & Rocha, 2011
- Ascidia papillata Bonnet & Rocha, 2011
- Ascidia papillosa Tokioka, 1967
- Ascidia parasamea Kott, 1985
- Ascidia paratropa (Huntsman, 1912)
- Ascidia perfluxa Sluiter, 1904
- Ascidia placenta Herdman, 1880
- Ascidia polytrema Herdman, 1906
- Ascidia prolata Kott, 1985
- Ascidia prona Monniot & Monniot, 1994
- Ascidia prunum Müller, 1776
- Ascidia pygmaea Michaelsen, 1918
- Ascidia retinens Monniot, 1984
- Ascidia retrosipho Millar, 1988
- Ascidia saccula Kott, 2006
- Ascidia sagamiana Tokioka, 1953
- Ascidia salvatoris (Traustedt, 1885)
- Ascidia samea Oka, 1935
- Ascidia santosi Millar, 1958
- Ascidia savignyi Hartmeyer, 1915
- Ascidia scaevola (Sluiter, 1904)
- Ascidia scalariforme Bonnet & Rocha, 2011
- Ascidia spinosa Sluiter, 1904
- Ascidia stenodes Millar, 1962
- Ascidia stewartensis Millar, 1982
- Ascidia subterranea Kneer et al., 2013
- Ascidia sulca Monniot, 1991
- Ascidia sydneiensis Stimpson, 1855
- Ascidia tapuni Monniot & Monniot, 1987
- Ascidia tenera Herdman, 1880
- Ascidia tenue Monniot, 1983
- Ascidia thompsoni Kott, 1952
- Ascidia translucida Sluiter, 1890
- Ascidia tricuspis Sluiter, 1904
- Ascidia tritonis Herdman, 1883
- Ascidia trunca Brunetti, 2007
- Ascidia unalaskensis (Ritter, 1913)
- Ascidia urnalia Monniot, 1994
- Ascidia vermiformis (Ritter, 1913)
- Ascidia virginea Müller, 1776
- Ascidia willeyi Oka, 1915
- Ascidia xamaycana Millar & Goodbody, 1974
- Ascidia zara Oka, 1935
- Ascidia zyogasima Tokioka, 1962
