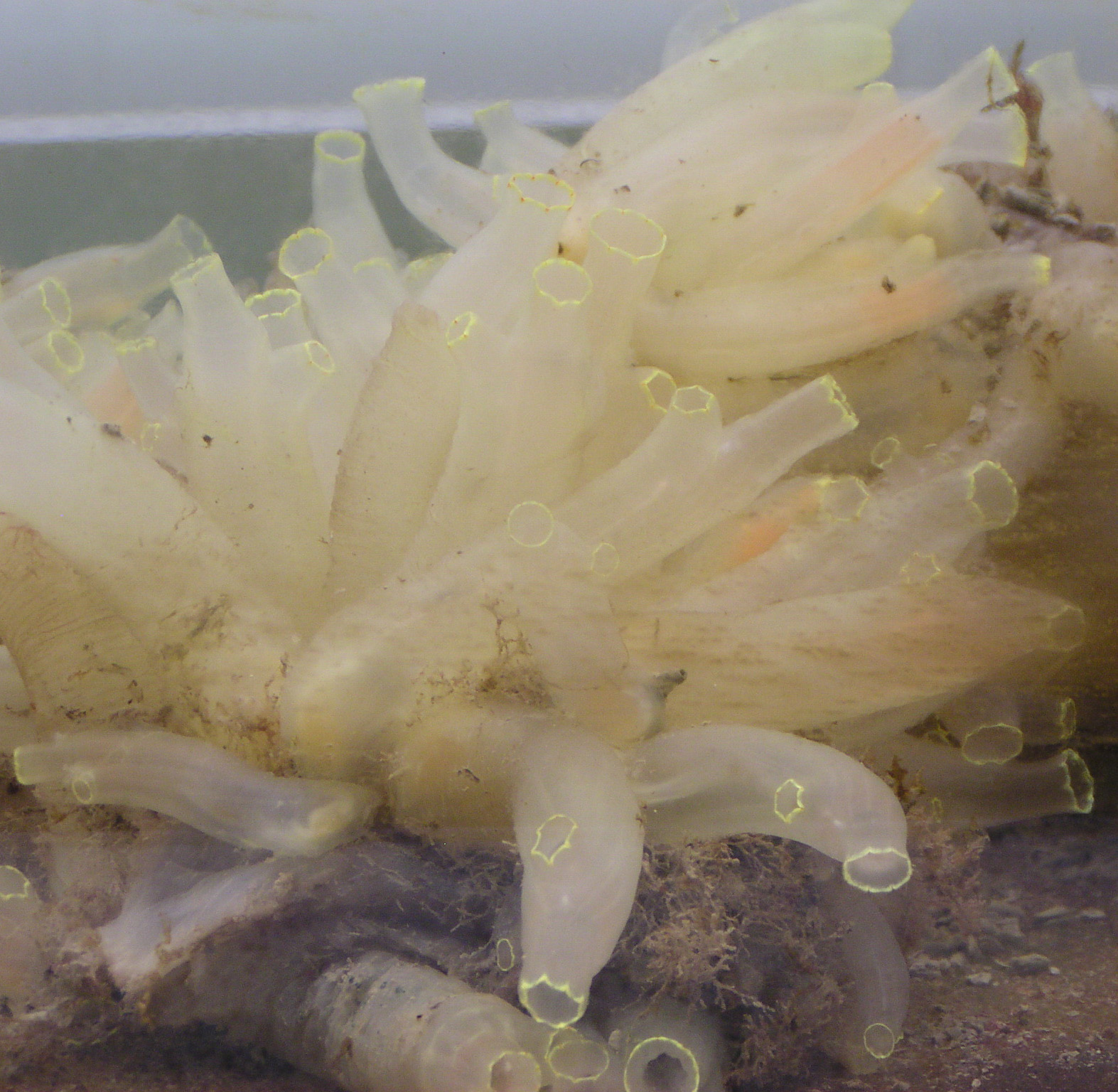
- Ciona intestinalis

Scientific classification
- Domain: Eukaryota
- Kingdom: Animalia
- Phylum: Chordata
- Subphylum: Tunicata
- Class: Ascidiacea
- Order: Phlebobranchia
- Family: Cionidae
- Genus: Ciona; Fleming, 1822

Species
- See text

= Ciona =

Genus of tunicates

Ciona is a genus of sea squirts in the family Cionidae.

The body of Ciona is bag-like and covered by a tunic, which is a secretion of the epidermal cells. The body is attached at a permanent base located at the posterior part, and the opposite bears two openings, the buccal (oral) and atrial (cloacal) siphons. The water is drawn into the ascidian through the buccal siphon and leaves the atrium through the atrial siphon.

== Species ==
Species in this genus include:

- Ciona antarctica Hartmeyer, 1911
- Ciona edwardsi Roule, 1884
- Ciona fascicularis Hancock, 1870
- Ciona gelatinosa Bonnevie, 1896
- Ciona hoshinoi Monniot C., 1991
- Ciona imperfecta Monniot C. & Monniot F., 1977
- Ciona intermedia Mastrototaro, 2020
- Ciona intestinalis (Linnaeus, 1767)
- Ciona longissima Hartmeyer, 1899
- Ciona mollis Ritter, 1907
- Ciona pomponiae Monniot C. & Monniot F., 1989
- Ciona robusta Hoshino & Tokioka, 1967
- Ciona roulei Lahille, 1887
- Ciona savignyi Herdman, 1882
- Ciona sheikoi Sanamyan, 1998

== Genome projects ==
As of 2008, the genomes of Ciona intestinalis and Ciona savignyi have been sequenced.

== Sexual reproduction ==
Ciona intestinalis is a hermaphrodite that releases sperm and eggs almost simultaneously into the surrounding seawater. C. intestinalis is self-sterile and thus has been used for studies on the mechanism of self-incompatibility. C. savigny is highly self-fertile, but non-self sperm out-compete self-sperm in fertilization competition assays. Mechanisms promoting non-self fertilization may have evolved to avoid inbreeding depression, and to facilitate outcrossing which allows the masking of deleterious recessive mutations.

== Use as food ==
Ciona is being developed in Norway as a potential substitute meat protein, after processing to remove its 'marine taste' and to make its texture less 'squid-like'.
