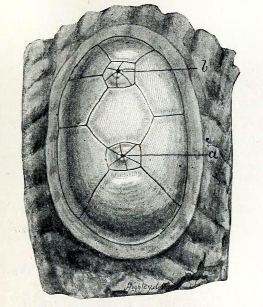
- Chelyosoma macleayanum

Scientific classification
- Domain: Eukaryota
- Kingdom: Animalia
- Phylum: Chordata
- Subphylum: Tunicata
- Class: Ascidiacea
- Order: Phlebobranchia
- Family: Corellidae
- Genus: Chelyosoma; Broderip & Sowerby, 1830

= Chelyosoma =

Genus of sea squirts

Chelyosoma is a genus of tunicates belonging to the family Corellidae.

The genus has almost cosmopolitan distribution.

Species:

- Chelyosoma columbianum Huntsman, 1912
- Chelyosoma dofleini Hartmeyer, 1906
- Chelyosoma inaequale Redikorzev, 1913
- Chelyosoma macleayanum Broderip & Sowerby, 1830
- Chelyosoma orientale Redikorzev, 1911
- Chelyosoma productum Stimpson, 1864
- Chelyosoma sibogae Sluiter, 1904
- Chelyosoma siboja Oka, 1906
- Chelyosoma yezoense Oka, 1928
