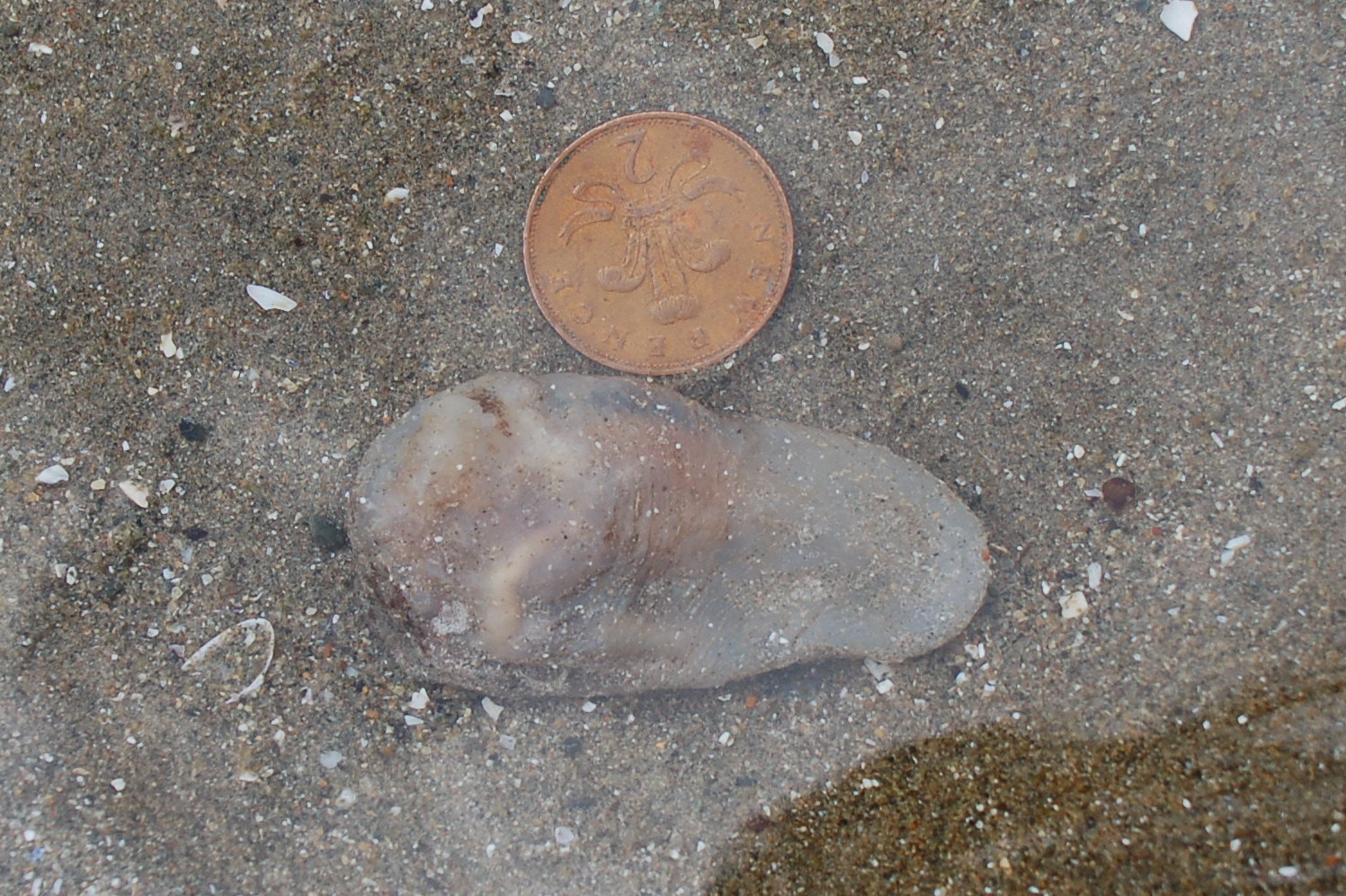
- Ascidiella aspersa

Scientific classification
- Kingdom: Animalia
- Phylum: Chordata
- Subphylum: Tunicata
- Class: Ascidiacea
- Order: Phlebobranchia
- Family: Ascidiidae
- Genus: Ascidiella; Roule

= Ascidiella =

Genus of sea squirts

Ascidiella is a genus of tunicates belonging to the family Ascidiidae.

The genus has almost cosmopolitan distribution.

Species:

- Ascidiella aspersa (Müller, 1776)
- Ascidiella scabra (Müller, 1776)
- Ascidiella senegalensis Michaelsen, 1914
