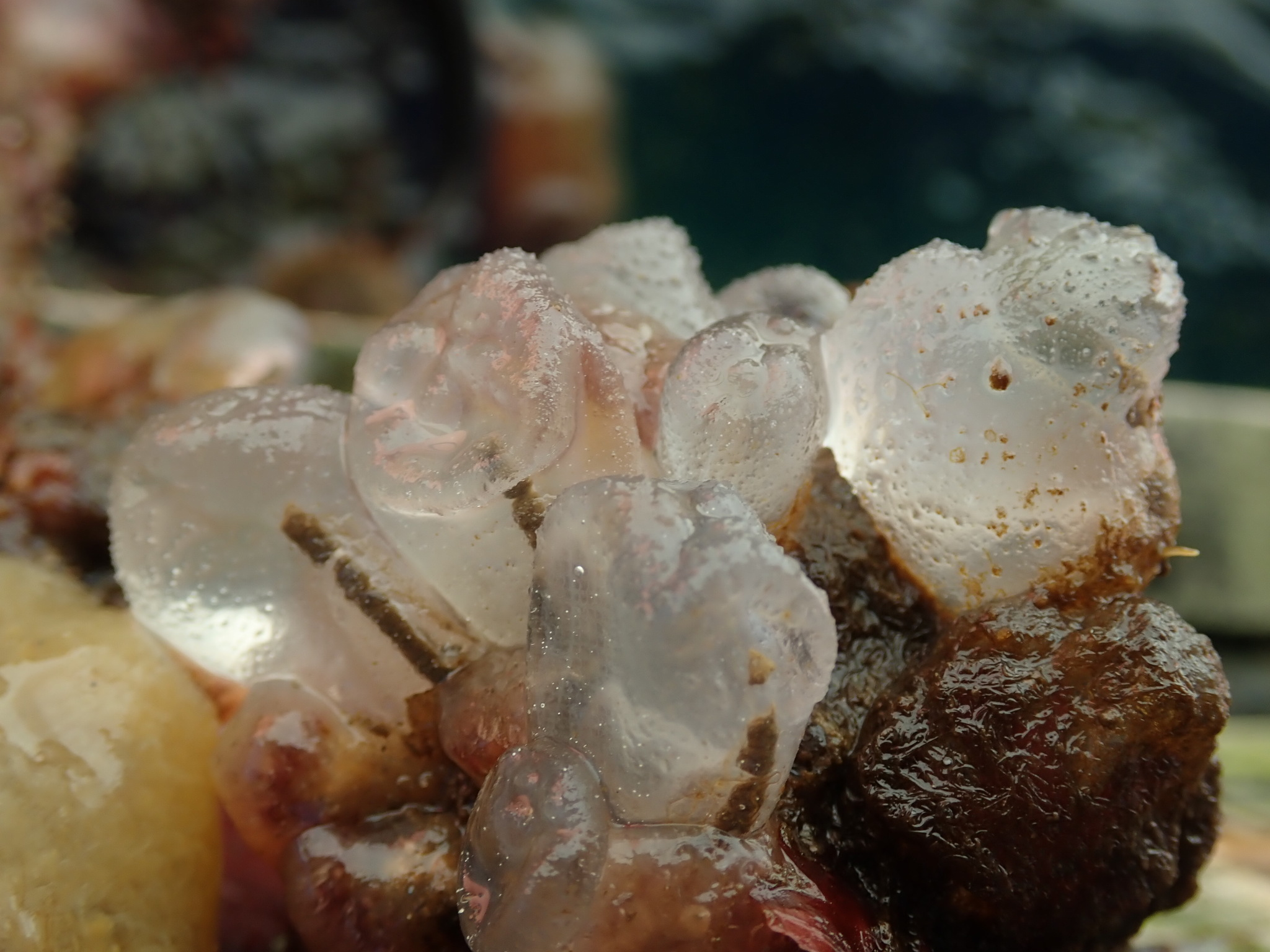
- Corella inflata

Scientific classification
- Domain: Eukaryota
- Kingdom: Animalia
- Phylum: Chordata
- Subphylum: Tunicata
- Class: Ascidiacea
- Order: Phlebobranchia
- Family: Corellidae
- Genus: Corella; Alder & Hancock, 1870

Species
- See text

= Corella (tunicate) =

Genus of sea squirts

Corella is a genus of sea squirts belonging to the family Corellidae. The genome of Corella inflata has been sequenced which has provided insight into tunicate evolution

== Genera ==
The World Register of Marine Species includes the following species in this genus:

- Corella aequabilis Sluiter, 1904
- Corella antarctica Sluiter, 1905
- Corella borealis Traustedt, 1886
- Corella brewinae Monniot F., 2013
- Corella eumyota Traustedt, 1882
- Corella halli Kott, 1951
- Corella inflata Huntsman, 1912
- Corella japonica Herdman, 1880
- Corella minuta Traustedt, 1882
- Corella parallelogramma (Müller, 1776)
- Corella willmeriana Herdman, 1898
