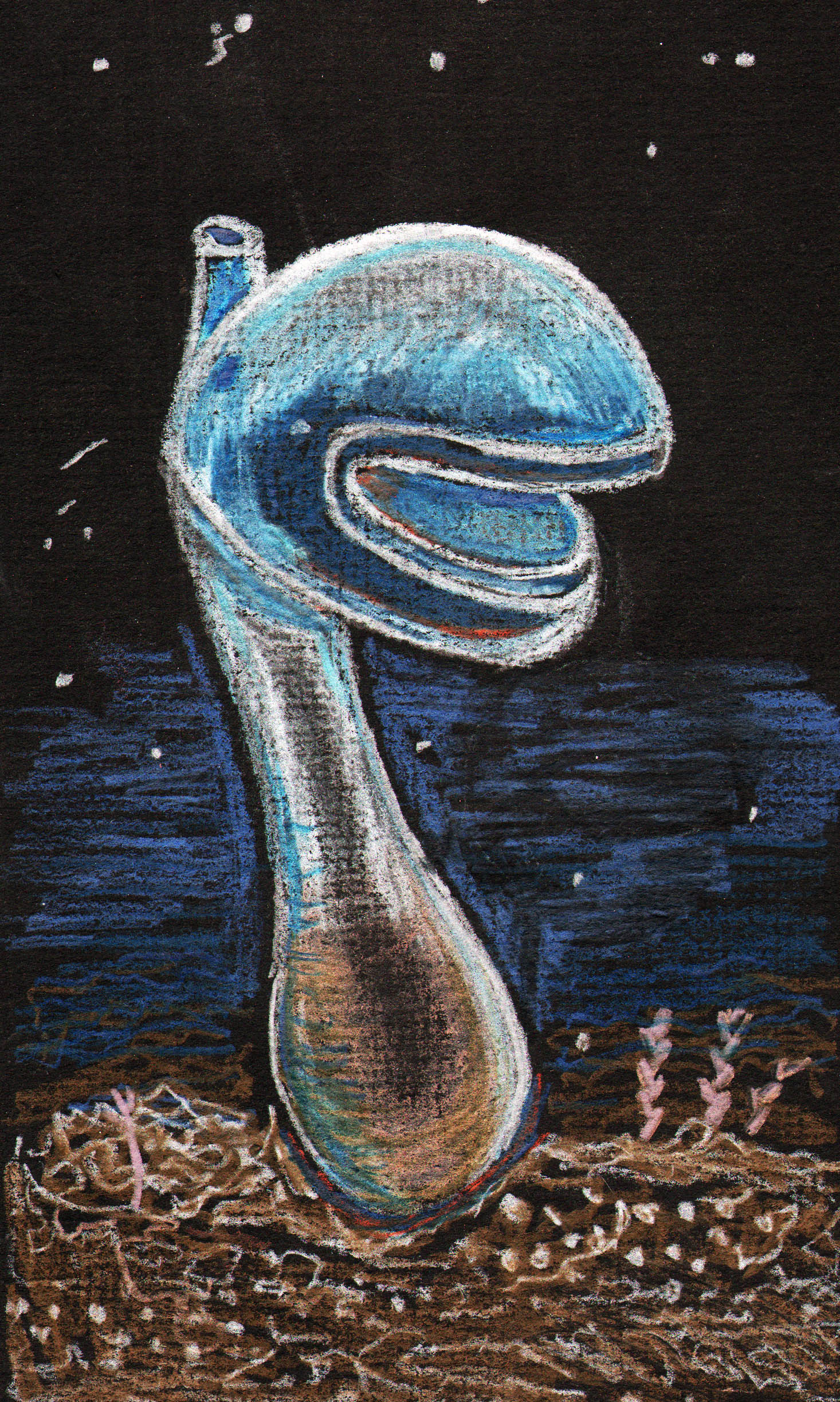
- A drawing of the predatory tunicate Megalodicopia hians

Scientific classification
- Kingdom: Animalia
- Phylum: Chordata
- Subphylum: Tunicata
- Class: Ascidiacea
- Order: Phlebobranchia
- Family: Octacnemidae

= Octacnemidae =

Family of tunicates

Octacnemidae is a family of tunicates belonging to the order Phlebobranchia.

Genera:

- Benthascidia Ritter, 1907
- Cibacapsa Monniot & Monniot, 1983
- Cryptia Monniot & Monniot, 1985
- Dicopia Sluiter, 1905
- Kaikoja Monniot, 1998
- Megalodicopia Oka, 1918
- Myopegma Monniot & Monniot, 2003
- Octacnemus Moseley, 1877
- Polyoctacnemus Ihle, 1935
- Situla Vinogradova, 1969
