= Hypobythius =

Scientific classification
- Domain: Eukaryota
- Kingdom: Animalia
- Phylum: Chordata
- Subphylum: Tunicata
- Class: Ascidiacea
- Order: Phlebobranchia
- Family: Hypobythiidae; Sluiter, 1895
- Genus: Hypobythius; Moseley, 1877

Genus of sea squirts

Hypobythius is a genus of tunicates. It is the only genus in the family Hypobythiidae in the order Phlebobranchia.
