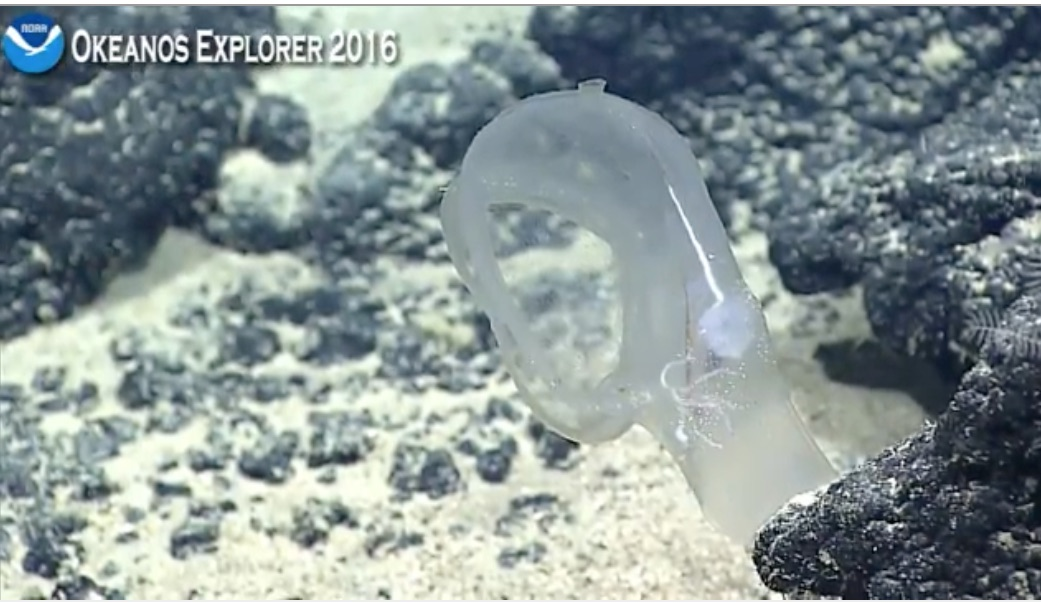

Scientific classification
- Domain: Eukaryota
- Kingdom: Animalia
- Phylum: Chordata
- Subphylum: Tunicata
- Class: Ascidiacea
- Order: Phlebobranchia
- Family: Octacnemidae
- Genus: Megalodicopia; Oka, 1918

= Megalodicopia =

Genus of sea squirts

Megalodicopia is a genus of tunicates belonging to the family Octacnemidae.

The species of this genus are found in Pacific Ocean.

Species:

- Megalodicopia hians Oka, 1918
- Megalodicopia rineharti (Monniot & Monniot, 1989)
