= Plurellidae =

Scientific classification
- Domain: Eukaryota
- Kingdom: Animalia
- Phylum: Chordata
- Subphylum: Tunicata
- Class: Ascidiacea
- Order: Phlebobranchia
- Family: Plurellidae; Kott, 1973

Family of tunicates

Plurellidae is a family of tunicates belonging to the order Phlebobranchia, and was first described by Patricia Kott in 1973.

Genera:

- Microgastra Kott, 1985
- Plurella Kott, 1973
