= Dimeatus =

Scientific classification
- Kingdom: Animalia
- Phylum: Chordata
- Subphylum: Tunicata
- Class: Ascidiacea
- Order: Phlebobranchia
- Family: Dimeatidae; Monniot C. & Monniot F., 1982
- Genus: Dimeatus; Monniot C. & Monniot F., 1982

Genus of sea squirts

Dimeatidae is a family of sea squirts belonging to the order Phlebobranchia. The only genus is Dimeatus.
