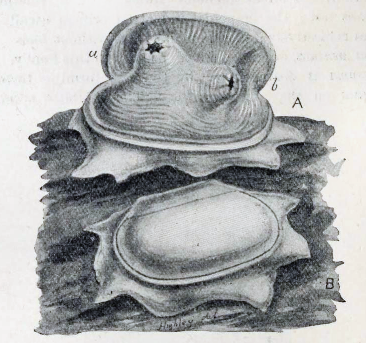
- Rhodosoma callense (Lacaze-Duthiers, 1865) (magnification x 10); A. "valve" open; B. shut; a) branchial orifice; b) atrial orifice

Scientific classification
- Domain: Eukaryota
- Kingdom: Animalia
- Phylum: Chordata
- Subphylum: Tunicata
- Class: Ascidiacea
- Order: Phlebobranchia
- Family: Corellidae
- Genus: Rhodosoma; Ehrenberg, 1828

Species
- Rhodosoma callense; Rhodosoma turcicum

Synonyms
- Chevreulius Lacaze-Duthiers, 1865; Corellascidia Hartmeyer, 1900; Peroides Macdonald, 1864; Schizascus Stimpson, 1855

= Rhodosoma =

Genus of sea squirts

Rhodosoma is a genus of tunicates.
