= Adagnesia =

Scientific classification
- Domain: Eukaryota
- Kingdom: Animalia
- Phylum: Chordata
- Subphylum: Tunicata
- Class: Ascidiacea
- Order: Phlebobranchia
- Family: Agneziidae
- Genus: Adagnesia; Kott, 1963
- Paratype site (QMGH4945 Rous Channel, Moreton Bay)

Genus of tunicates

Adagnesia is a genus of tunicates in the family Agneziidae, first described in 1963 by Patricia Kott. The type species is Adagnesia opaca Kott, 1963.

In Australia it is found in seas off New South Wales, Queensland and Victoria at depths of up to 5000 metres. However, around the world it is found in seas of both the northern and southern Atlantic Oceans, and the eastern and southern Pacific basins.

Cladogram for this genus, taken from the Catalogue of Life:

- Agneziidae
  - Adagnesia
    - Adagnesia antarctica
    - Adagnesia charcoti
    - Adagnesia fissa
    - Adagnesia henriquei
    - Adagnesia opaca
    - Adagnesia rimosa
    - Adagnesia weddelli
    - Adagnesia venusta
    - Adagnesia vesicullophora
  - Agnesiopsis
  - Agnezia
  - Caenagnesia
  - Proagnesia
  - Pterygascidia
