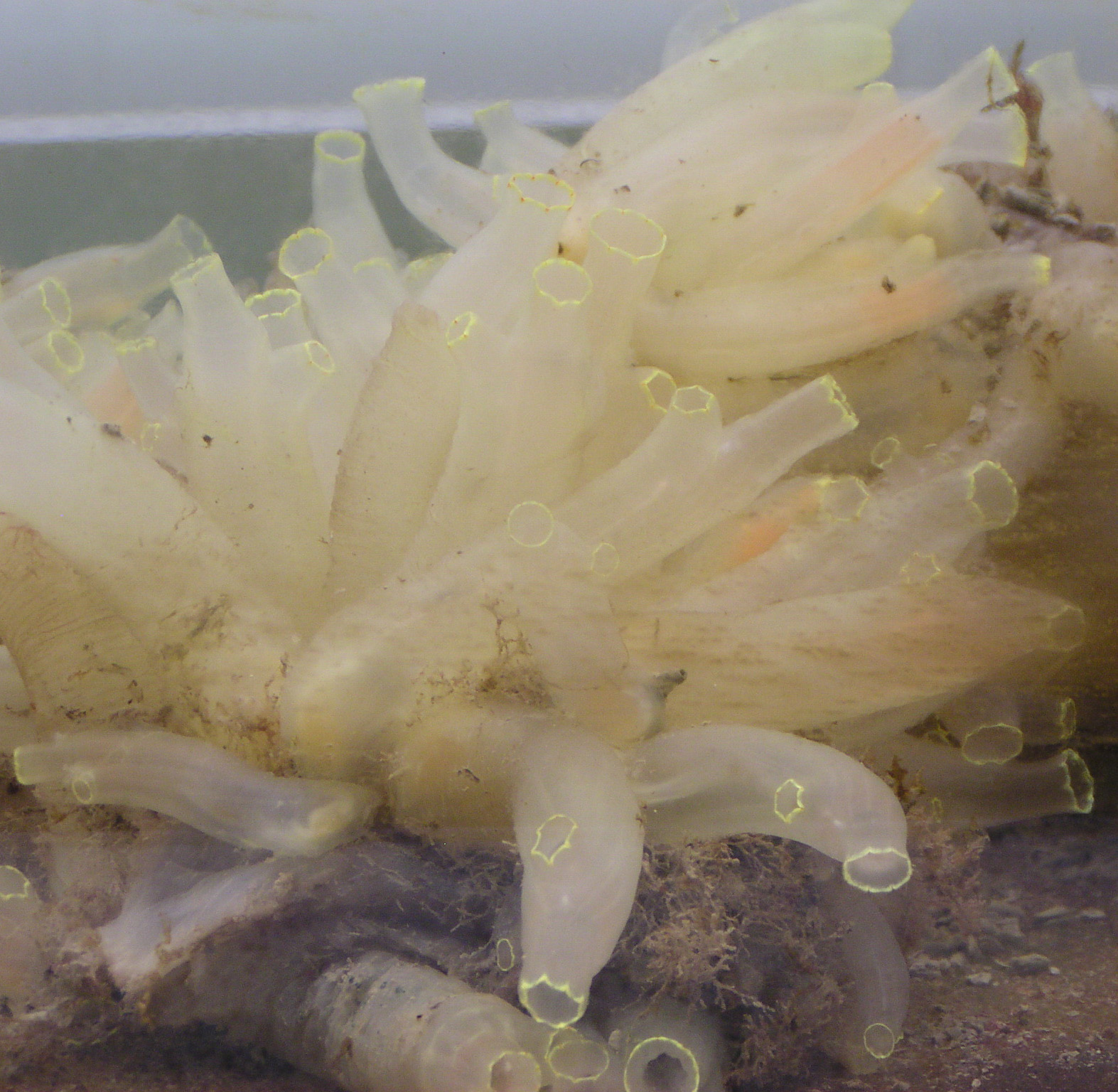

Scientific classification
- Kingdom: Animalia
- Phylum: Chordata
- Subphylum: Tunicata
- Class: Ascidiacea
- Order: Phlebobranchia
- Family: Cionidae
- Genus: Ciona
- Species: C. intestinalis

Binomial name
- Ciona intestinalis (Linnaeus, 1767)

Synonyms
- List: Tethyum sociabile Gunnerus, 1765; Ciona sociabilis (Gunnerus, 1765); Ascidia intestinalis Linnaeus, 1767; Phallusia intestinalis (Linnaeus, 1767); Ascidia canina Mueller, 1776; Ascidia corrugata Müller, 1776; Ciona canina (Mueller, 1776); Ascidia virens Fabricius, 1779; Ascidia viridiscens Brugière, 1792; Ascidia membranosa Renier, 1807; Ascidia virescens Pennant, 1812; Ascidia diaphanea Quoy & Gaimard, 1834; Ciona diaphanea (Quoy & Gaimard, 1834); Ascidia ocellata Agassiz, 1850; Ciona ocellata (Agassiz, 1850); Ascidia tenella Stimpson, 1852; Ciona tenella (Stimpson, 1852); Ascidia pulchella Alder, 1863; Ciona pulchella (Alder, 1863)

= Ciona intestinalis =

Species of ascidian

Ciona intestinalis (sometimes known by the common name of vase tunicate) is an ascidian (sea squirt), a tunicate with very soft tunic. Its Latin name literally means "pillar of intestines", referring to the fact that its body is a soft, translucent column-like structure, resembling a mass of intestines sprouting from a rock. It is a globally distributed cosmopolitan species: this species has been introduced to various parts of the world and is considered as an invasive species.

Since Linnaeus described the species, Ciona intestinalis has been used as a model species of an invertebrate chordate in developmental biology and genomics.

== Taxonomy ==
Although Linnaeus first categorised Ciona intestinalis as a kind of mollusk, Alexander Kovalevsky found a tadpole-like larval stage during development that shows similarity to vertebrates. Recent molecular phylogenetic studies as well as phylogenomic studies support that sea squirts are the closest invertebrate relatives of vertebrates.

Studies conducted between 2005 and 2010 have shown that this species may in fact be a species complex, with at least two, possibly four, sister species that should be split out from C. intestinalis. One of these cryptic species were proven to be an already described species; Ciona robusta.

== Description ==
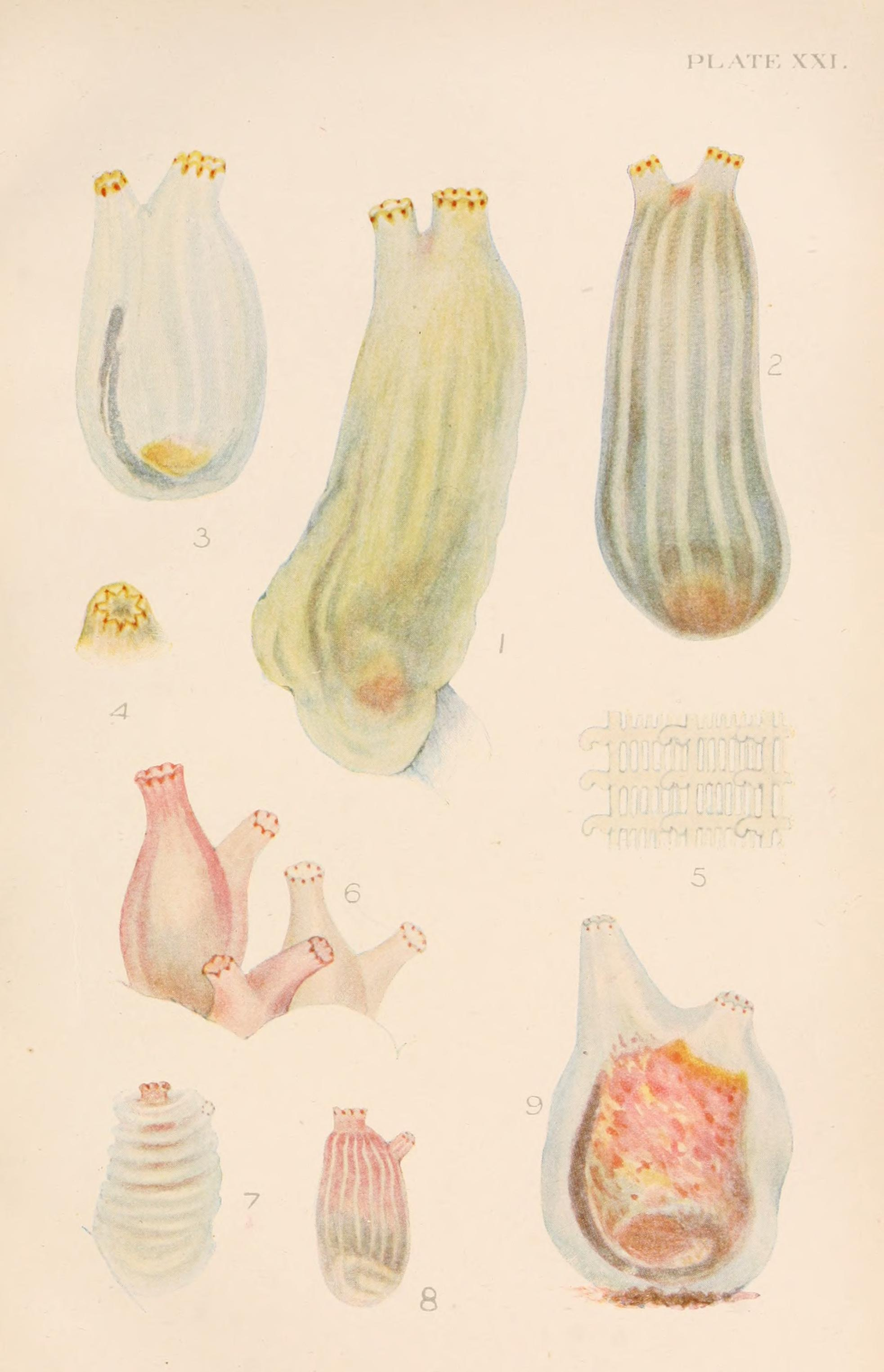
Ciona intestinalis illustrated in Fig. 1 - 8

Ciona intestinalis is a solitary tunicate with a cylindrical, soft, gelatinous body, up to 20 centimetres (8 in) long. The body colour and colour at the distal end of siphons are major external characters distinguishing sister species within the species complex.

The body of Ciona is bag-like and covered by a tunic, which is a secretion of the epidermal cells. The body is attached by a permanent base located at the posterior end, while the opposite extremity has two openings, the buccal and atrial siphons. Water is drawn into the ascidian through the buccal (oral) siphon and leaves the atrium through the atrial siphon (cloacal).

In the sea squirt C. intestinalis a CB1 and CB2-type cannabinoid receptors is found to be targeted to axons, indicative of an ancient role for cannabinoid receptors as axonal regulators of neuronal signalling.

=== Genetics ===
Ciona intestinalis was one of the first animals to have its full genome sequenced in 2002, using a specimen from Half Moon Bay in California, US, It possesses a very small genome size, about 160 Mbp, or less than 1/20 of the human genome, which consists of 14 pairs of chromosomes with about 16,000 genes. A number of these genes correspond to almost every family of genes in vertebrates.

The draft genome analysis identified nine Hox genes, which are Ci-Hox1, 2, 3, 4, 5, 6, 10, 12, and 13. Ciona robusta, the closest relative of Ciona intestinalis, also has the same set of Hox genes. The organization of Hox genes is only known for C. intestinalis among ascidians. The nine Hox genes are located on two chromosomes; Ci-Hox1 to 10 on one chromosome and Ci-Hox12 and 13 on another. The intergenic distances within the Ciona Hox genes are extraordinarily long. Seven Hox genes, Ci-Hox1 to 10, are distributed along approximately half the length of the chromosome. Comparisons to Hox gene expression and location in other species suggests that the Hox genes in ascidian genomes are under a dispersing condition.

A majority of genetically encoded voltage indicator are based on the C. intestinalis voltage-sensitive domain (Ci-VSD).

There is one transferrin ortholog which is divergent from those of vertebrate models, and even more divergent from non-chordates.

A retinol dehydrogenase – CiRdh10 – is disclosed in Belyaeva et al. 2015.

== Reproduction ==
Ciona intestinalis is a hermaphroditic broadcast spawner though cannot self-fertilize. Released gametes can stay in the water column for 1 to 2 days, while the larvae are free-swimming for 2 to 10 days.

C. intestinalis is self-sterile, as sperm and eggs are released into the surrounding seawater almost simultaneously, and it thus has been used for studies on the mechanism of self-incompatibility. Self/non-self-recognition molecules are considered to play a key role in the process of interaction between sperm and the vitelline coat of the egg. It appears that self/non-self recognition in ascidians such as C. intestinalis is mechanistically similar to self-incompatibility systems in flowering plants. Self-incompatibility promotes out-crossing which provides the adaptive advantage at each generation of masking deleterious recessive mutations (i.e. genetic complementation).

== Relation to humans ==
C. intestinalis is a model species, used in studies of developmental biology and genomics.

Ciona intestinalis is considered to be an invasive species and grows in dense aggregations on any floating or submerged substrate, particularly artificial structures like pilings, aquaculture gear, floats and boat hulls, in the lower intertidal to sub-tidal zones. It often grows with or on other fouling organisms. It is thought to spread to new areas mainly through hull fouling. Since its larvae can live for up to 10 days, this species may also be transferred through the release of bilge or ballast water.

The potential impact of C. intestinalis and its introduction to new habitats can be avoided, so most agencies suggest that fish and shellfish harvesters are to avoid transfer of harvested shellfish and fishing gear to other areas, and to dry gear thoroughly before transfer, along with inspecting boat hulls. They also recommend that, if necessary, to clean them thoroughly, and to disinfect with bleach or vinegar and dry them before moving to other areas. Agencies also recommended the disposal of any organisms removed from boat hulls or gear on land and to release bilge water on land or disinfect it.
