= Agneziidae =

Scientific classification
- Domain: Eukaryota
- Kingdom: Animalia
- Phylum: Chordata
- Subphylum: Tunicata
- Class: Ascidiacea
- Order: Phlebobranchia
- Family: Agneziidae; Monniot C. & Monniot F., 1991

Family of tunicates

Agneziidae is a family of tunicates belonging to the order Phlebobranchia. The agneziids were originally named Agnesiidae by Huntsman in 1912. The current accepted name for the family is Agneziidae.

Genera:

- Adagnesia Kott, 1963
- Agnezia Monniot & Monniot, 1991
- Caenagnesia Ärnbäck-Christie-Linde, 1938
- Proagnesia Millar, 1955
- Pterygascidia Sluiter, 1904
