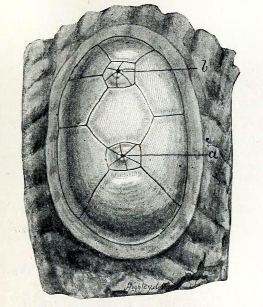
- Chelyosoma macleayanum

Scientific classification
- Domain: Eukaryota
- Kingdom: Animalia
- Phylum: Chordata
- Subphylum: Tunicata
- Class: Ascidiacea
- Order: Phlebobranchia
- Family: Corellidae; Lahille, 1888

Genera
- See text

= Corellidae =

Family of sea squirts

Corellidae is a family of sea squirts belonging to the order Phlebobranchia.

== Genera ==
The World Register of Marine Species includes the following genera in this family:

- Abyssascidia Herdman, 1880
- Chelyosoma Broderip & Sowerby, 1830
- Clatripes Monniot F. & Monniot C., 1976
- Corella Alder & Hancock, 1870
- Corelloides Oka, 1926
- Corellopsis Hartmeyer, 1903
- Corynascidia Herdman, 1882
- Dextrogaster Monniot F., 1962
- Mysterascidia Monniot C. & Monniot F., 1982
- Rhodosoma Ehrenberg, 1828
- Xenobranchion Ärnbäck-Christie-Linde, 1950
