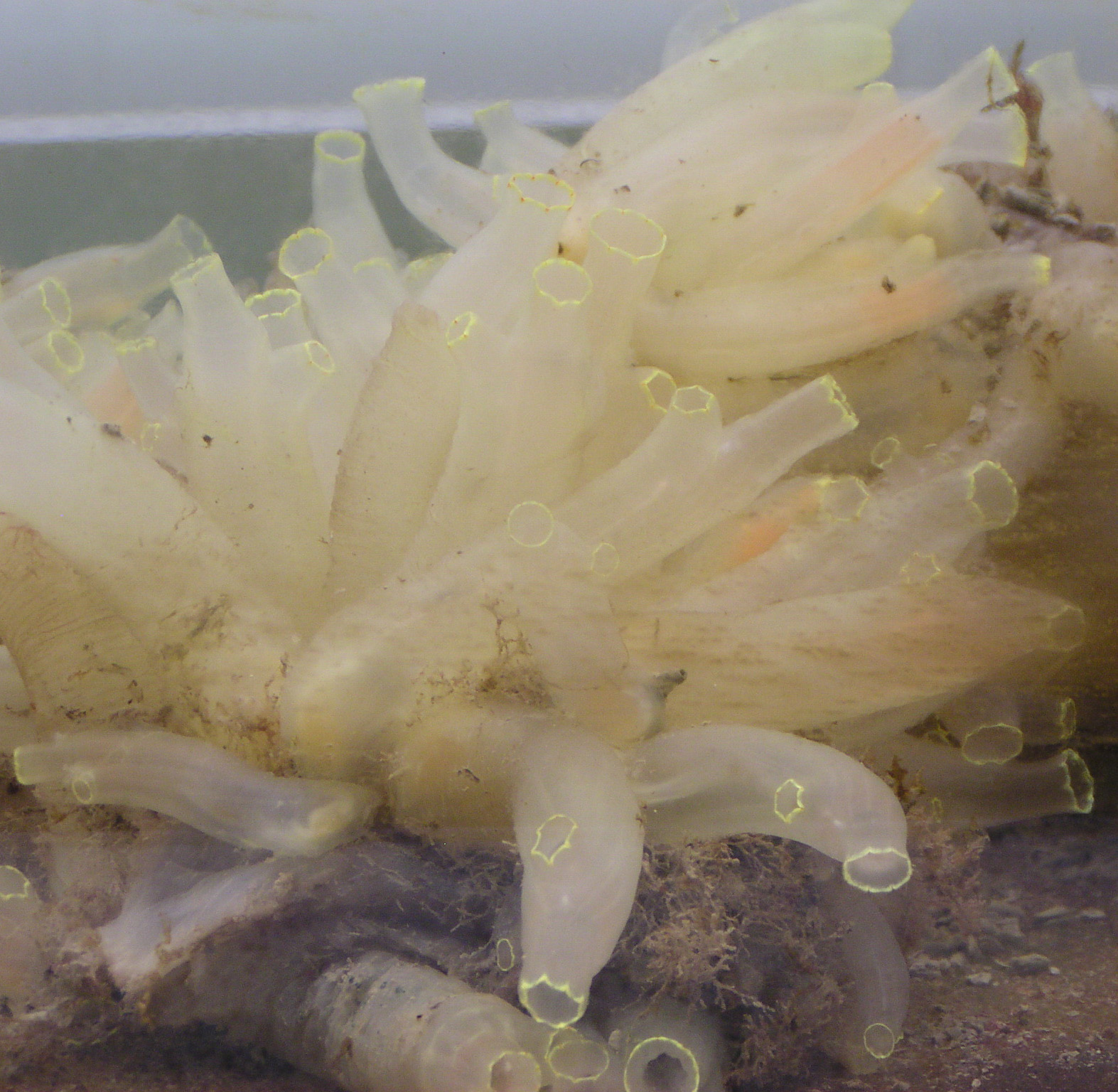
- Ciona intestinalis

Scientific classification
- Domain: Eukaryota
- Kingdom: Animalia
- Phylum: Chordata
- Subphylum: Tunicata
- Class: Ascidiacea
- Order: Phlebobranchia
- Family: Cionidae

Genera
- Araneum; Ciona; Tantillulum

= Cionidae =

Family of sea squirts

Cionidae is a family of sea squirts belonging to the order Phlebobranchia.
