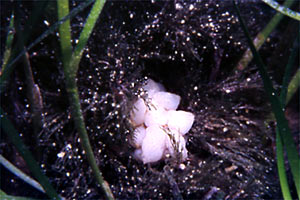
- Group of Phallusia mammillata (white)

Scientific classification
- Kingdom: Animalia
- Phylum: Chordata
- Subphylum: Tunicata
- Class: Ascidiacea
- Order: Phlebobranchia
- Family: Ascidiidae; Herdman, 1882

Genera
- See text

= Ascidiidae =

Family of sea squirts

Ascidiidae ("same-sac family") is a family of tunicates in the class Ascidiacea.

Some species contain elevated amounts of vanadium.

There are 4 genera:

- Ascidia
- Ascidiella
- Fimbrora
- Phallusia
- Psammascidia

== See also ==
- Vanabin
