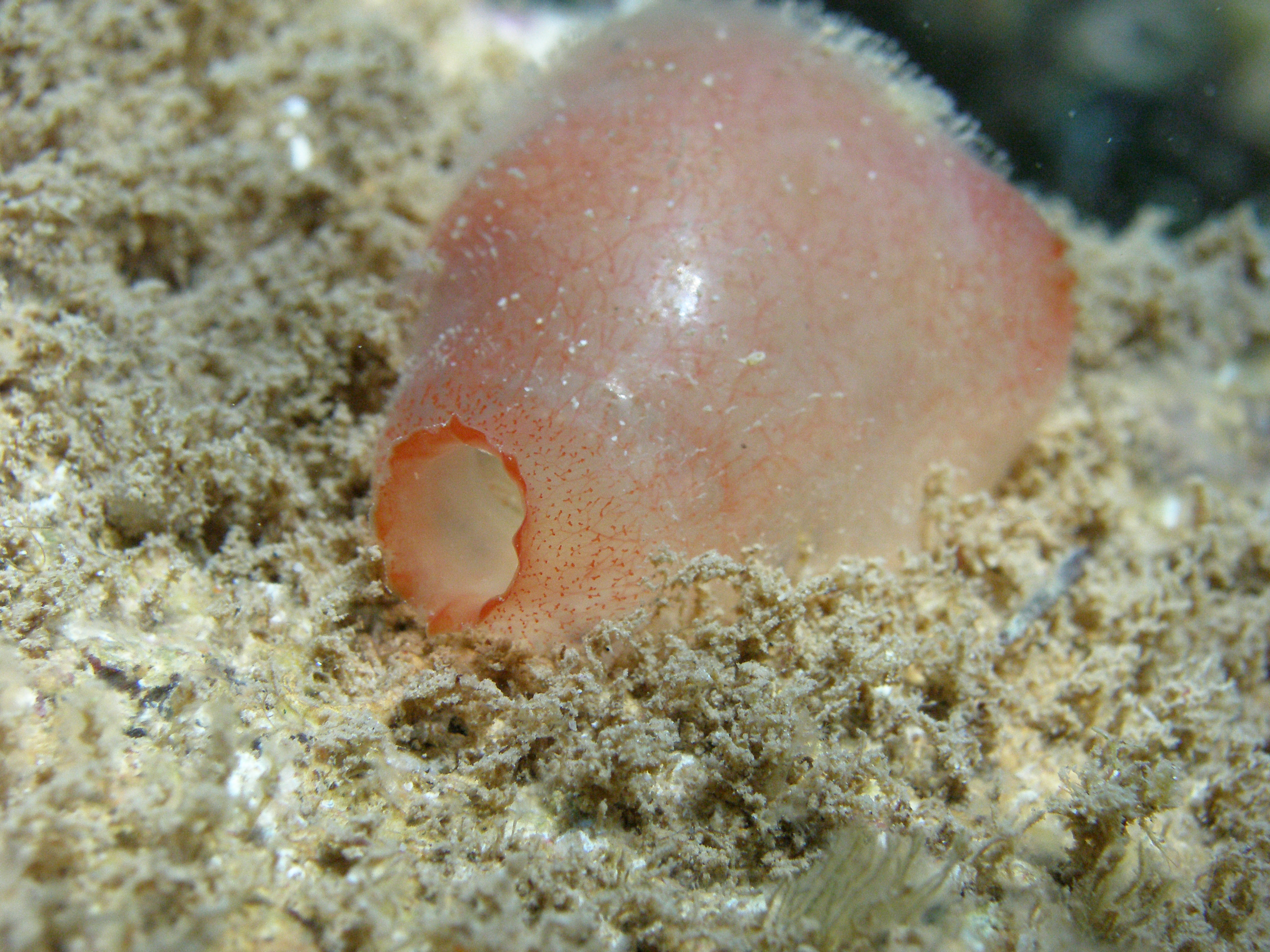
- Ascidia

Scientific classification
- Kingdom: Animalia
- Phylum: Chordata
- Subphylum: Tunicata
- Class: Ascidiacea
- Order: Phlebobranchia; Lahille, 1886

Families
- Agneziidae; Ascidiidae; Cionidae; Corellidae; Dimeatidae; Hypobythiidae; Octacnemidae; Perophoridae; Plurellidae

Synonyms
- Dictyobranchiae

= Phlebobranchia =

Order of tunicates

Phlebobranchia is an order of sea squirts in the class Ascidiacea, first described by Fernando Lahille in 1886.

== Characteristics ==
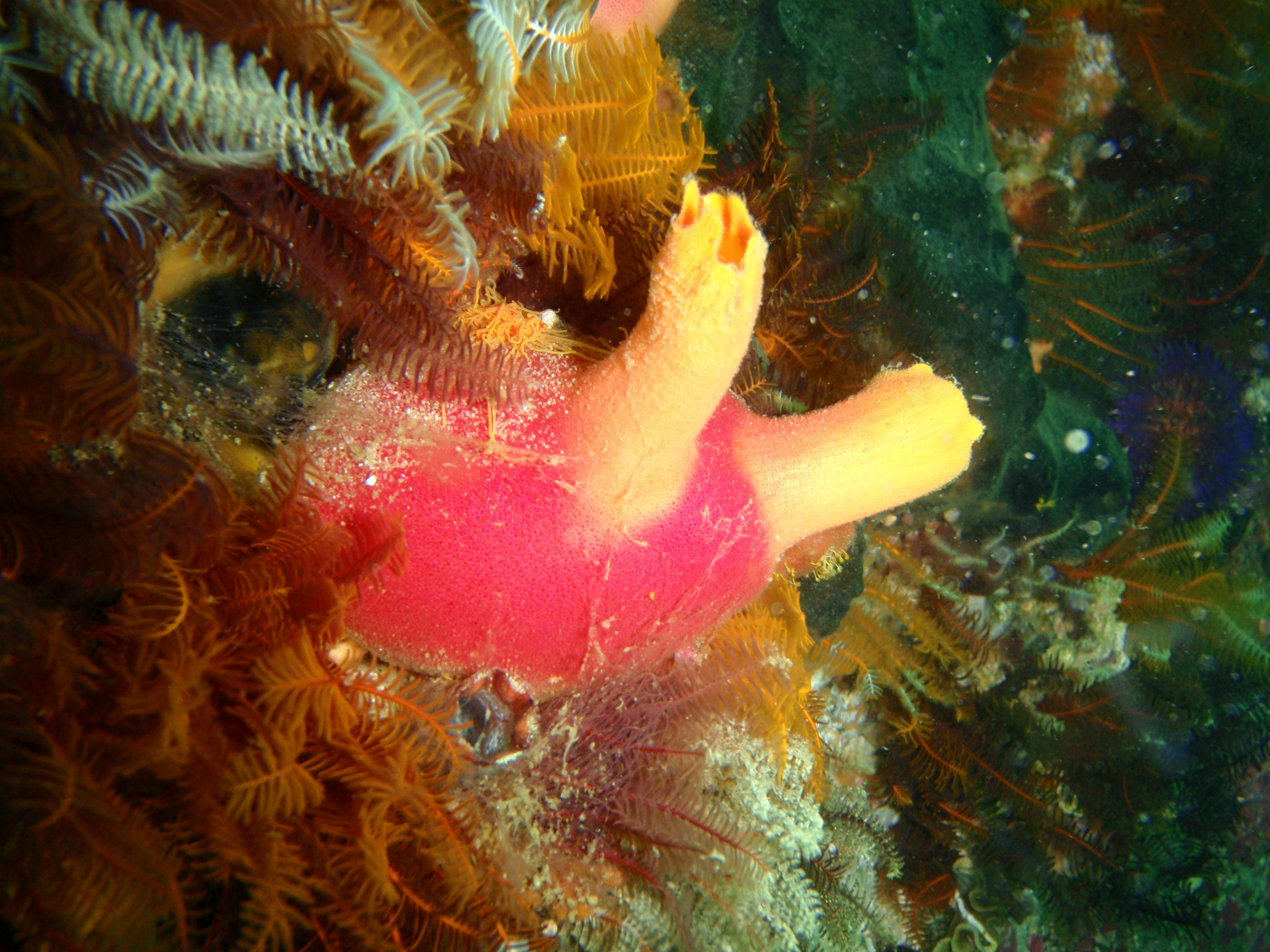
Ascidia incrassata, "Red spotted sea squirt".

The group includes both colonial and solitary animals. They are distinguished from other sea squirts by the presence of longitudinal vessels in the pharyngeal basket. This provides the etymology of their name: in ancient greek, φλέψς, φλεβός means "blood vessel". Another characteristic of phlebobranchians is the gonads being surrounded by a loop of gut. The posterior part of the abdomen is absent, and many species also lack the pericardial cavity that surrounds the heart and other internal organs in many other sea squirts.

== Taxonomy ==
- ?†Permosomidae
  - ?†Permosoma tunicatum Jaekel 1915 [Sphaerospongia permotessellata Parona 1933]
- Agneziidae Monniot & Monniot 1991 [Agnesiidae Michaelsen 1898]
  - Adagnesia Kott 1963
  - Agnezia Monniot & Monniot 1991 [Agnesia Michaelsen 1898 non Koninck 1883]
  - Caenagnesia Ärnbäck-Christie-Linde 1938
  - Proagnesia depressa (Millar 1955)
  - Pterygascidia Sluiter 1904 [Ciallusia Van Name 1918]
- Ascidiidae Herdman 1882 [incl. Namiella Monniot & Monniot 1968]
  - Ascidia Linnaeus 1767 [Ascidie Linnaeus 1767; Ascidiopsis Verrill 1872; Bathyascidia Hartmeyer 1901; Phallusioides Huntsman 1912; Tunica; Herdmania Hartmeyer 1900 non Lahille 1888 non Thompson 1893;]
  - Ascidiella Roule 1884
  - Fimbrora calsubia Monniot & Monniot 1991 [Fimbrosa Monniot & Monniot 1991]
  - Phallusia Savigny 1816 [Pachychlaena Hedman 1880; Phallusiopsis Hartmeyer 1908; Plurascidia Monniot & Monniot 2000]
  - Psammascidia teissieri Monniot 1962
- Cionidae Lahille 1887 [incl. Pseudodiazona]
  - Araneum Monniot & Monniot 1973
  - Ciona Fleming 1822
  - Tantillulum molle Monniot & Monniot 1984
- Corellidae Lahille 1888 [Rhodosomatidae Hartmeyer 1908]
  - Abyssascidia Herdman 1880
  - Chelyosoma Broderip & Sowerby 1830
  - Clatripes flaccidus Monniot & Monniot 1976
  - Corella Alder & Hancock 1870
  - Corelloides molle Oka 1926
  - Corellopsis Hartmeyer 1903
  - Corynascidia Herdman 1882 [Agnesiopsis Monniot 1969]
  - Dextrogaster suecica Monniot 1962
  - Mysterascidia symmetrica Monniot & Monniot 1984
  - Rhodosoma Ehrenberg 1828 [Chevreulius Lacaze-Duthiers 1865; Corellascidia Hartmeyer 1900; Peroides Macdonald 1864; Schizascus Stimpson 1855]
  - Xenobranchion Ärnbäck-Christie-Linde 1950
- Dimeatidae Sanamyan 2001
  - Dimeatus Monniot & Monniot 1982
- Hypobythiidae
  - Hypobythius Moseley 1879
- Octacnemidae
  - Benthascidia michaelseni Ritter 1907
  - Cibacapsa gulosa Monniot & Monniot 1983
  - Cryptia planum Monniot & Monniot 1985
  - Dicopia Sluiter 1905
  - Kaikoja Monniot 1998
  - Megalodicopia Oka 1918
  - Myopegma Monniot & Monniot 2003
  - Octacnemus Moseley 1877
  - Polyoctacnemus patagoniensis (Metcalf 1893) Ihle
  - Situla Vinogradova 1969
- Perophoridae Giard 1872
  - Ecteinascidia Herdman 1880 [Perophoropsis Lahille 1890; Sluiteria]
  - Perophora Wiegmann 1835 [Tibiania]
- Plurellidae Kott 1973
  - Microgastra granosa (Sluiter 1904)
  - Plurella Kott 1973
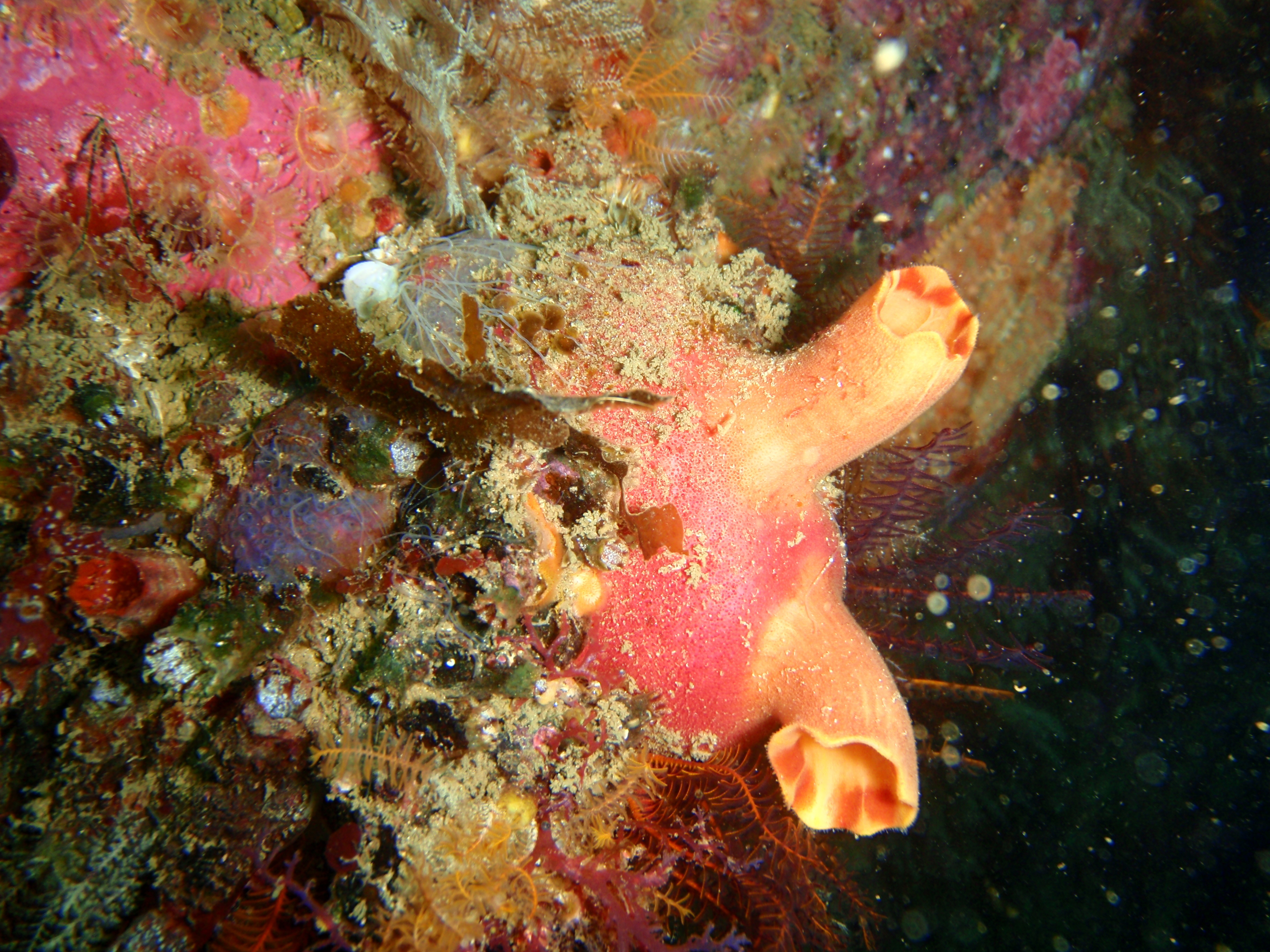
Ascidia incrassata (Ascidiidae)

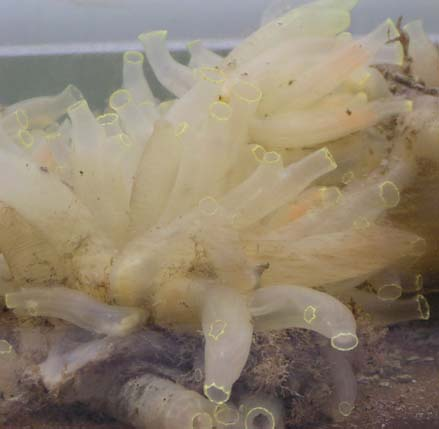
Ciona intestinalis (Cionidae)

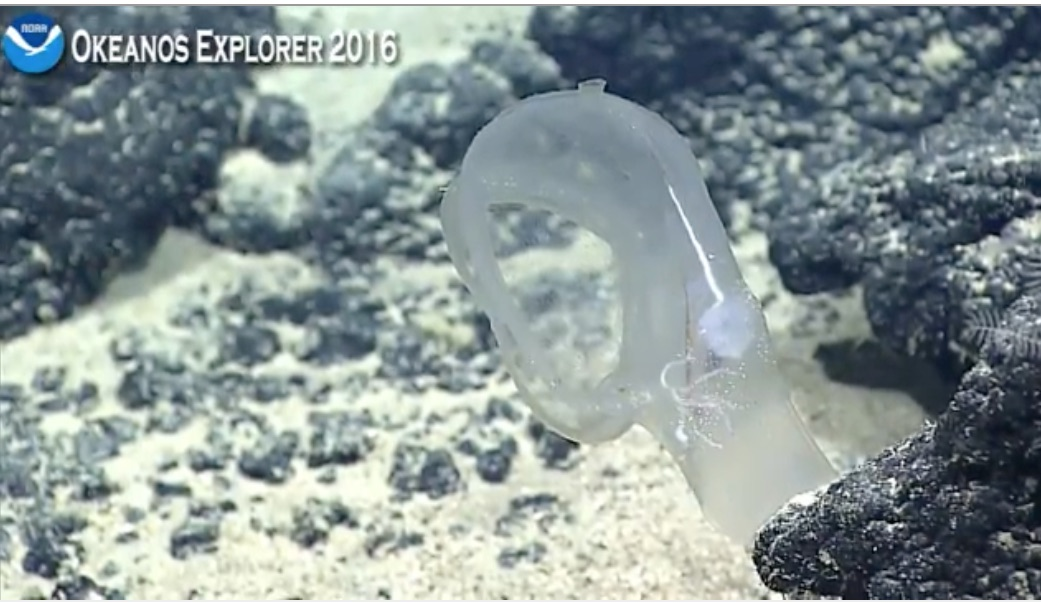
Megalodicopia sp. (Octacnemidae)

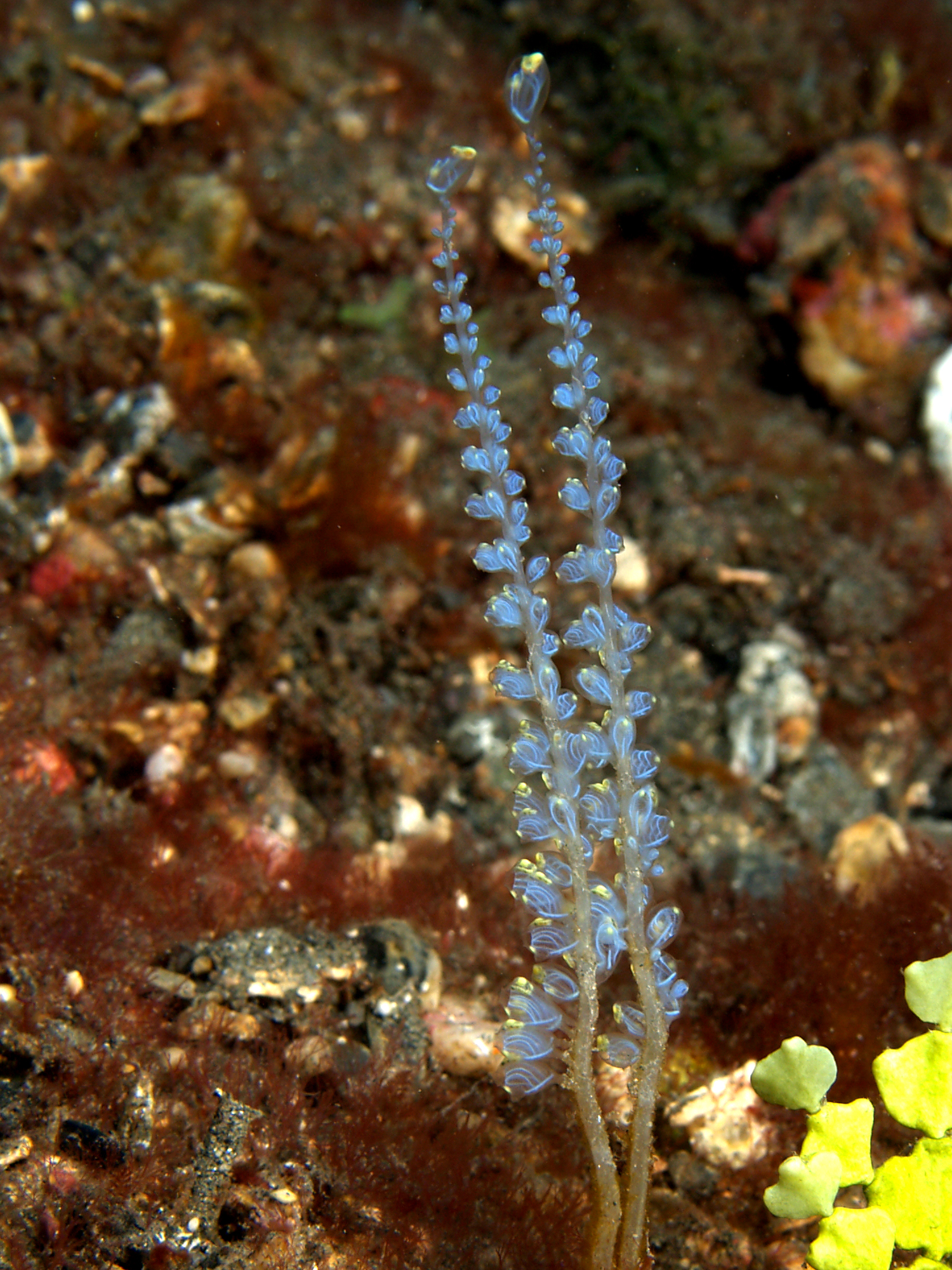
Perophora namei (Perophoridae)
