= List of tunicates of Ireland =

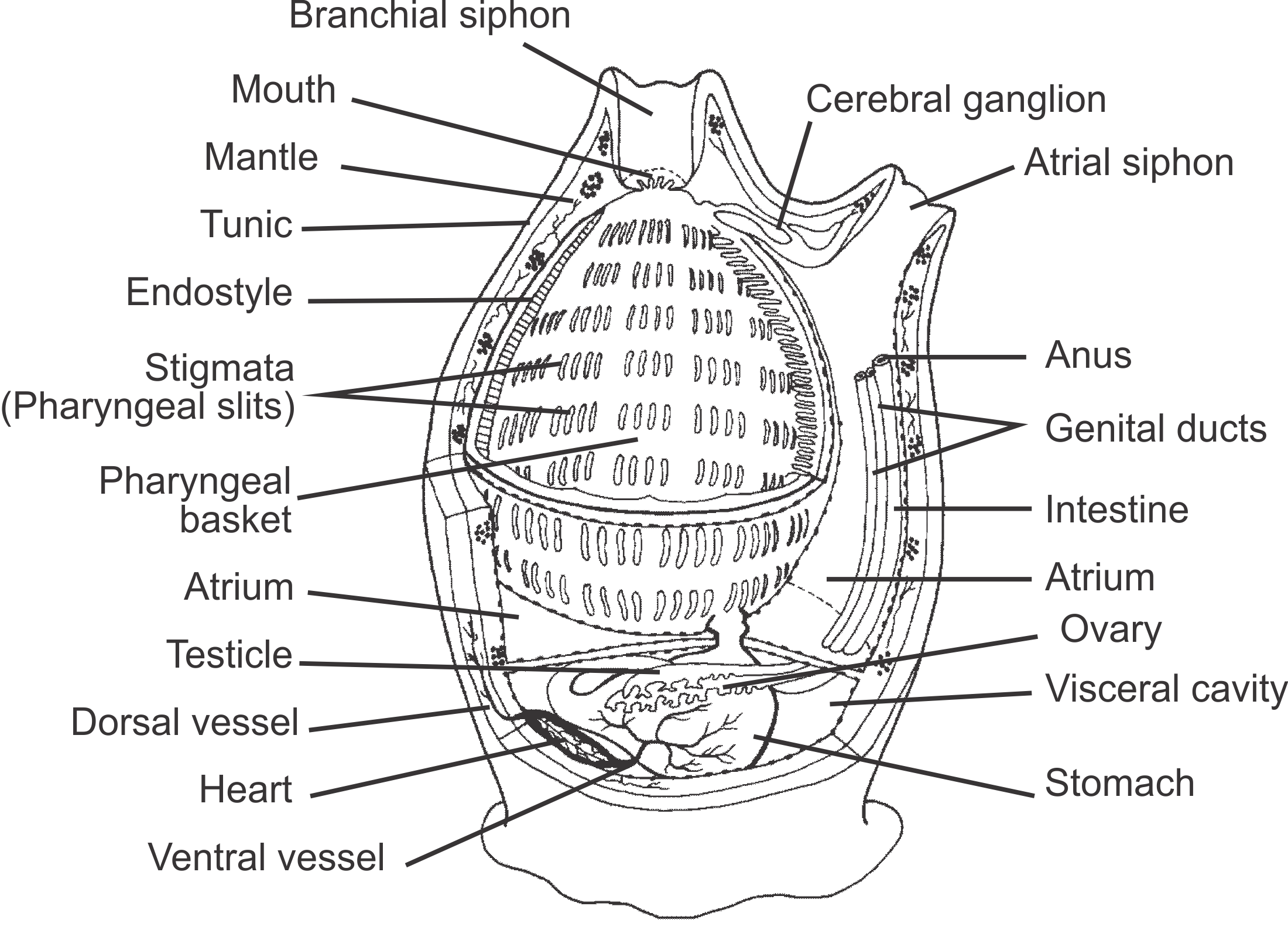
Internal anatomy of a generalised tunicate

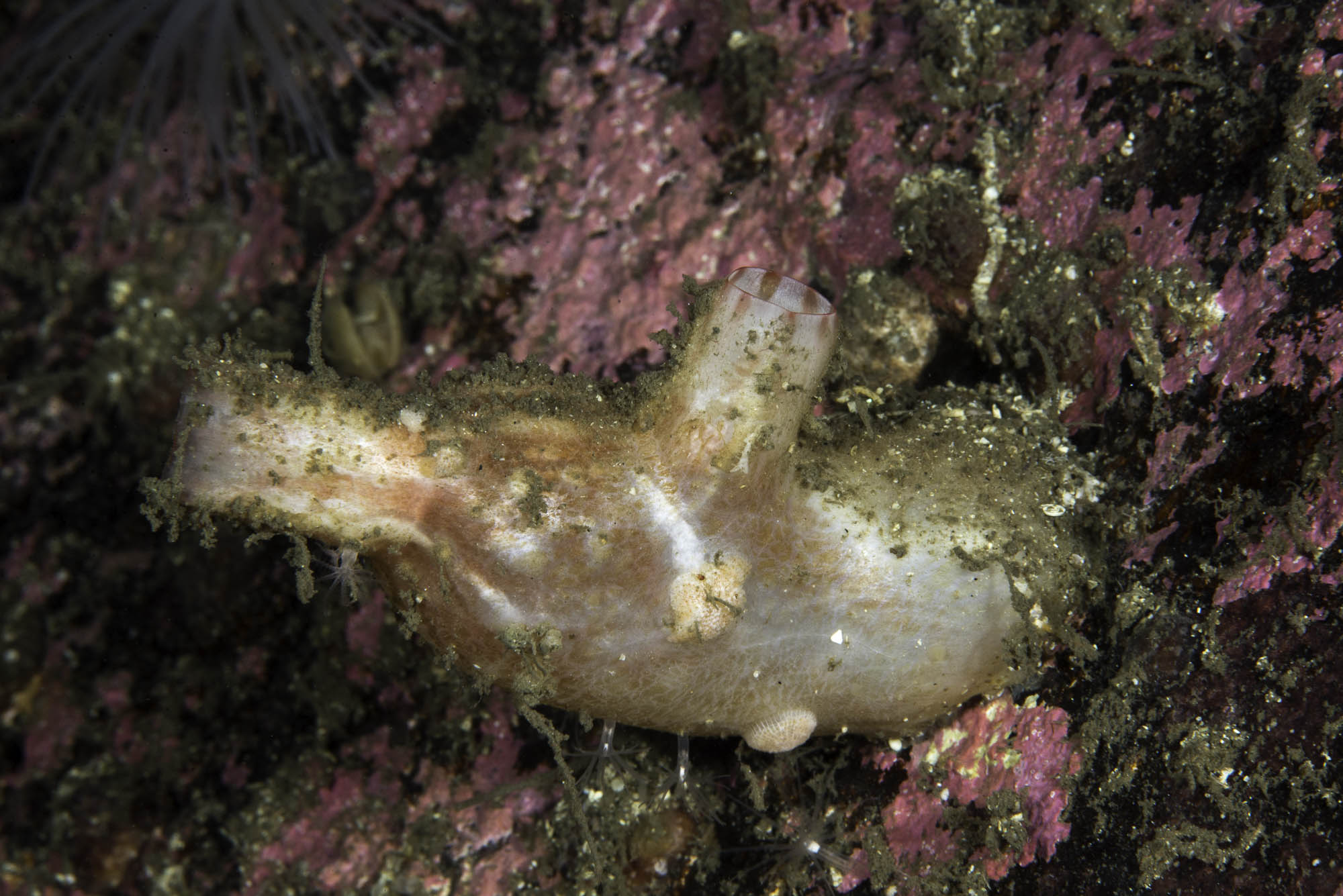
Polycarpa pomaria

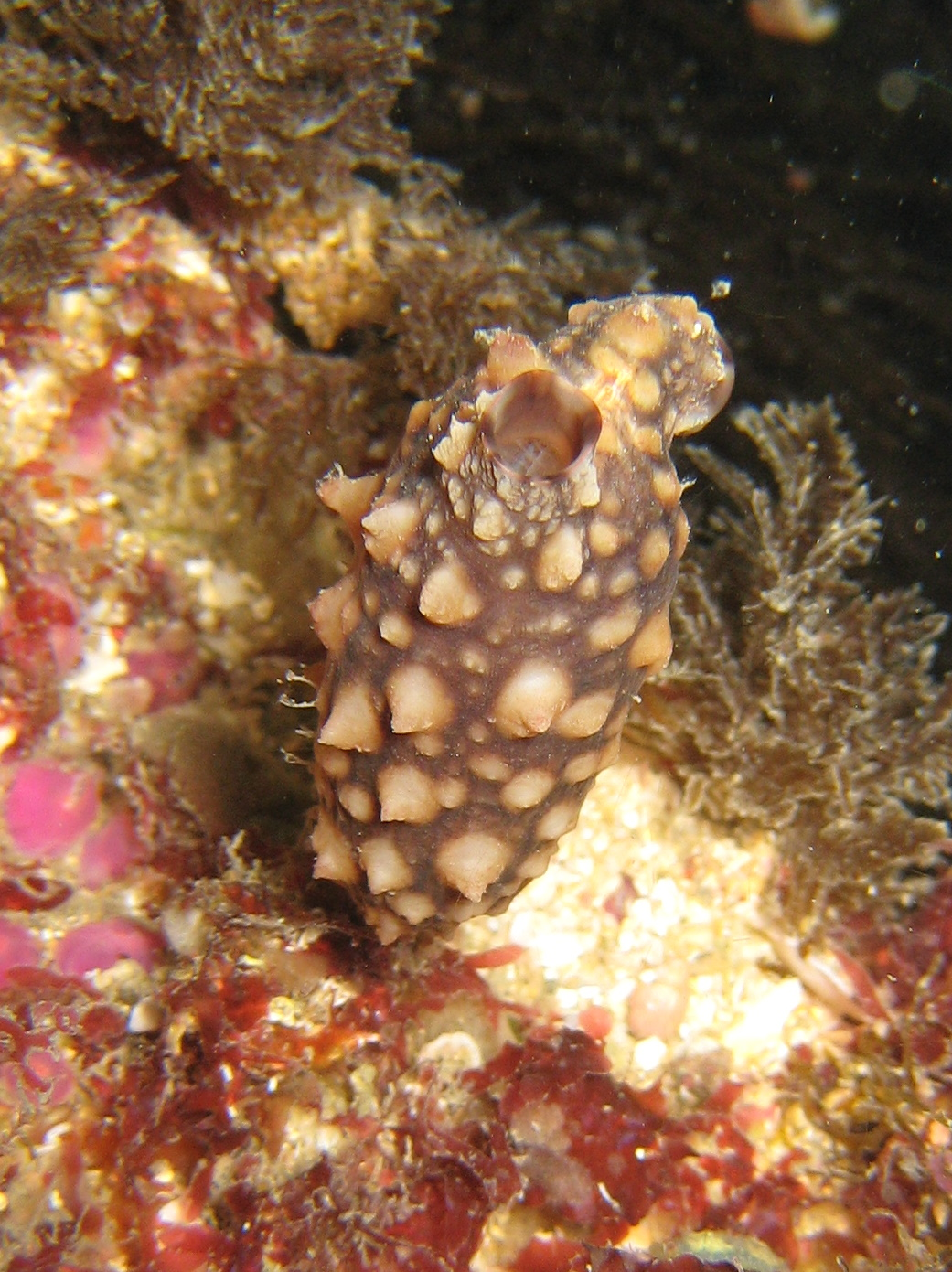
Styela clava

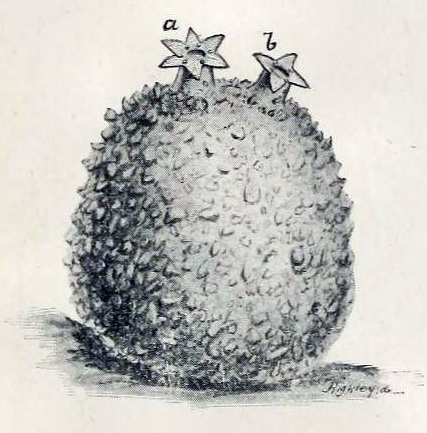
Molgula oculata

There are 81 species of tunicate (subphylum Tunicata) recorded in Ireland.

== Class Ascidiacea (sea squirts) ==
=== Order Aplousobranchia ===
==== Family Clavelinidae ====
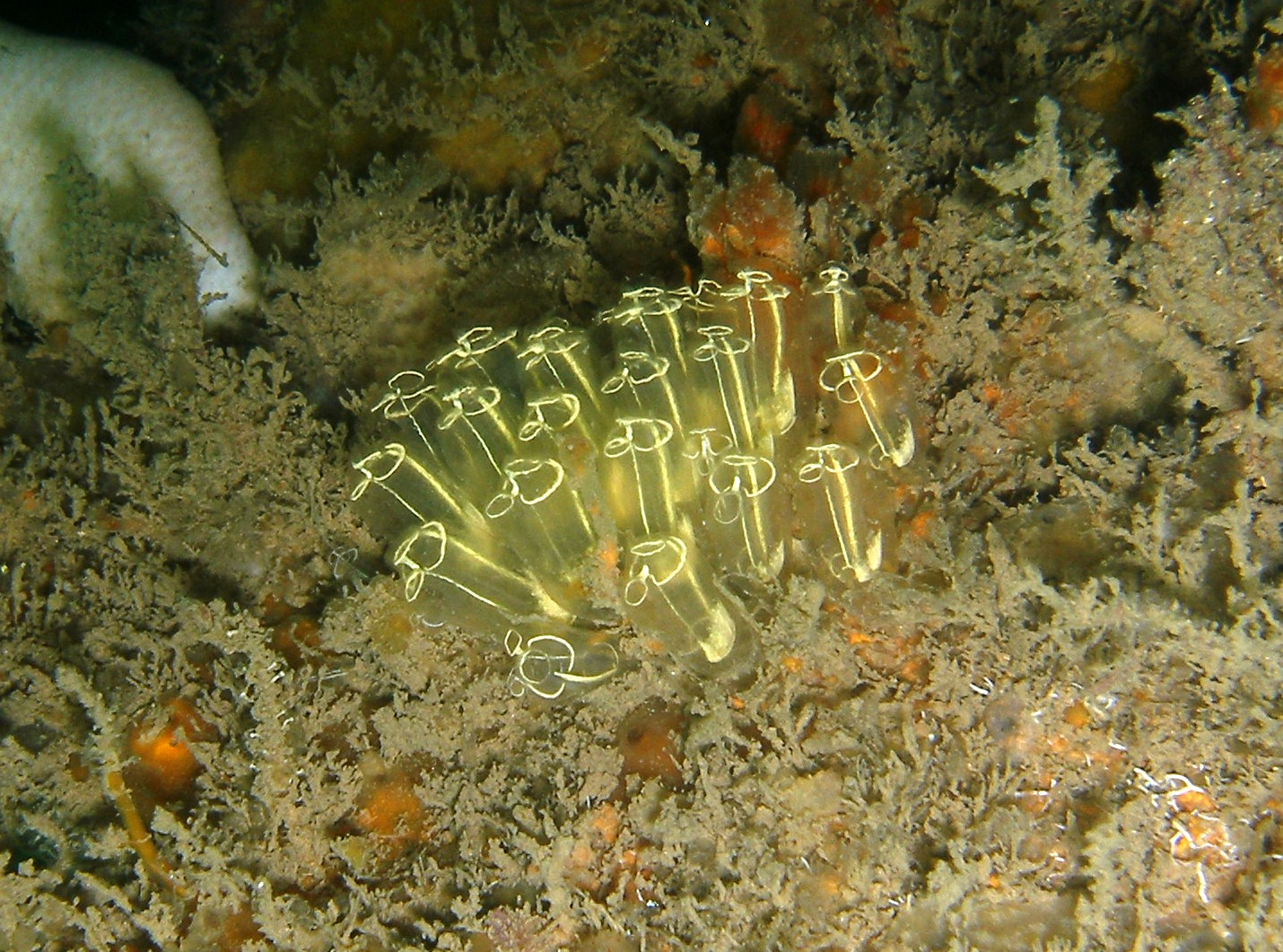
Clavelina lepadiformis (light-bulb sea squirt) colony

- Clavelina lepadiformis (light-bulb sea squirt)

==== Family Didemnidae ====
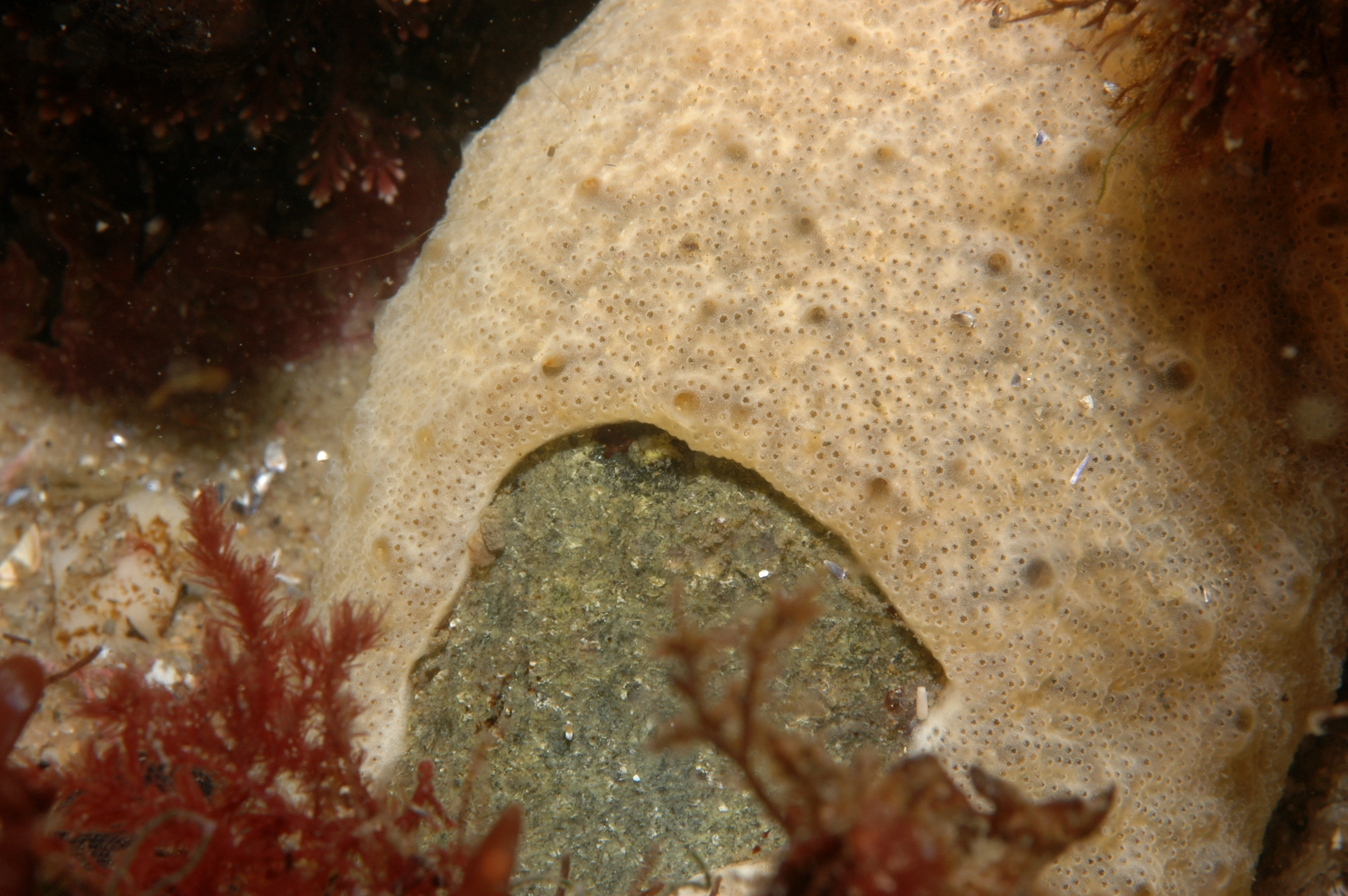
Didemnum vexillum colony

- Didemnum fulgens
- Didemnum maculosum
- Didemnum vexillum (carpet sea squirt, an invasive species recorded in Strangford Lough in 2012)
- Diplosoma listerianum
- Diplosoma spongiforme
- Lissoclinum perforatum
- Trididemnum cereum
- Trididemnum tenerum

==== Family Holozoidae ====
- Distaplia rosea

==== Family Polycitoridae ====
- Archidistoma aggregatum

==== Family Polyclinidae ====
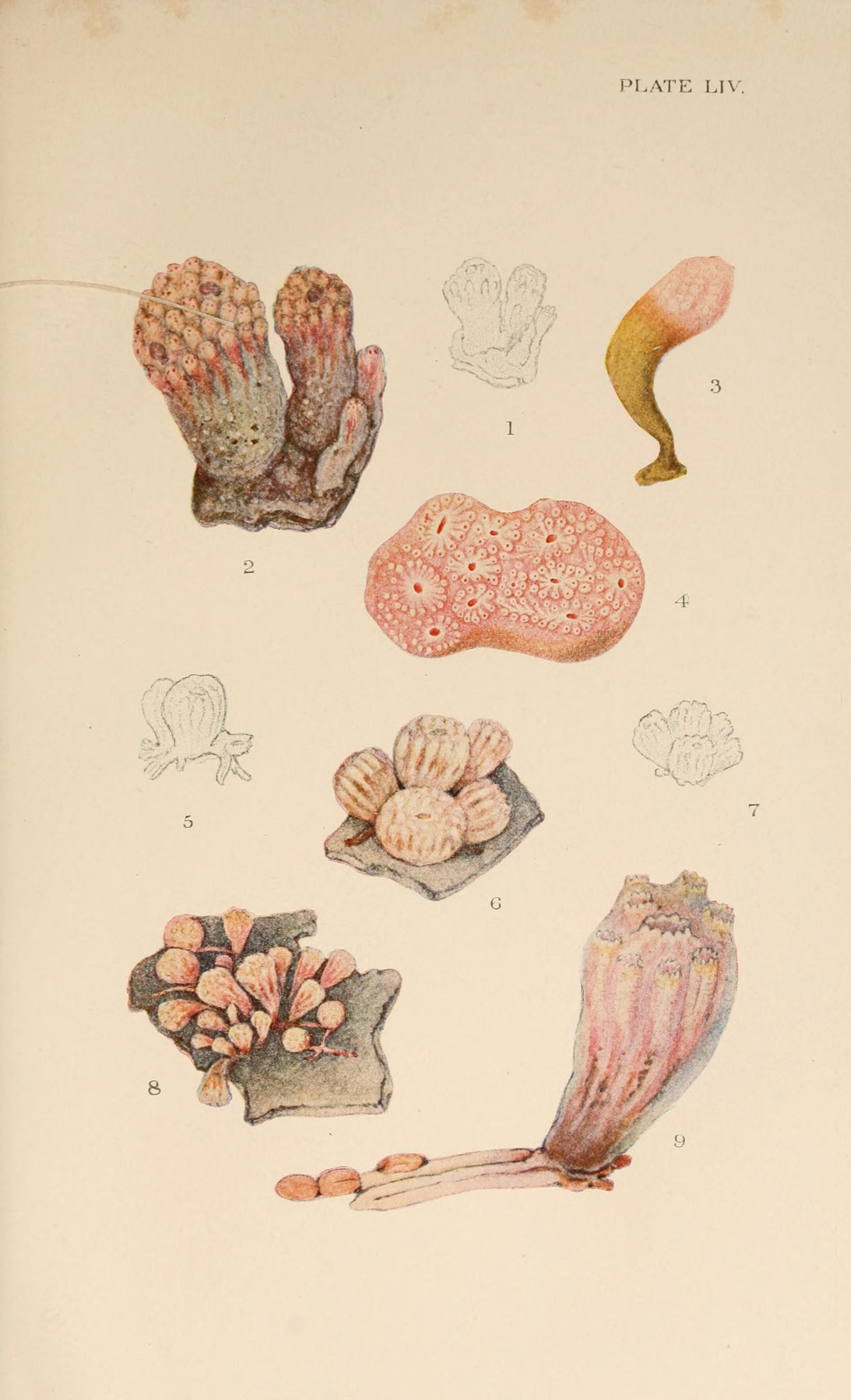
Morchellium argus (red-flake ascidian)

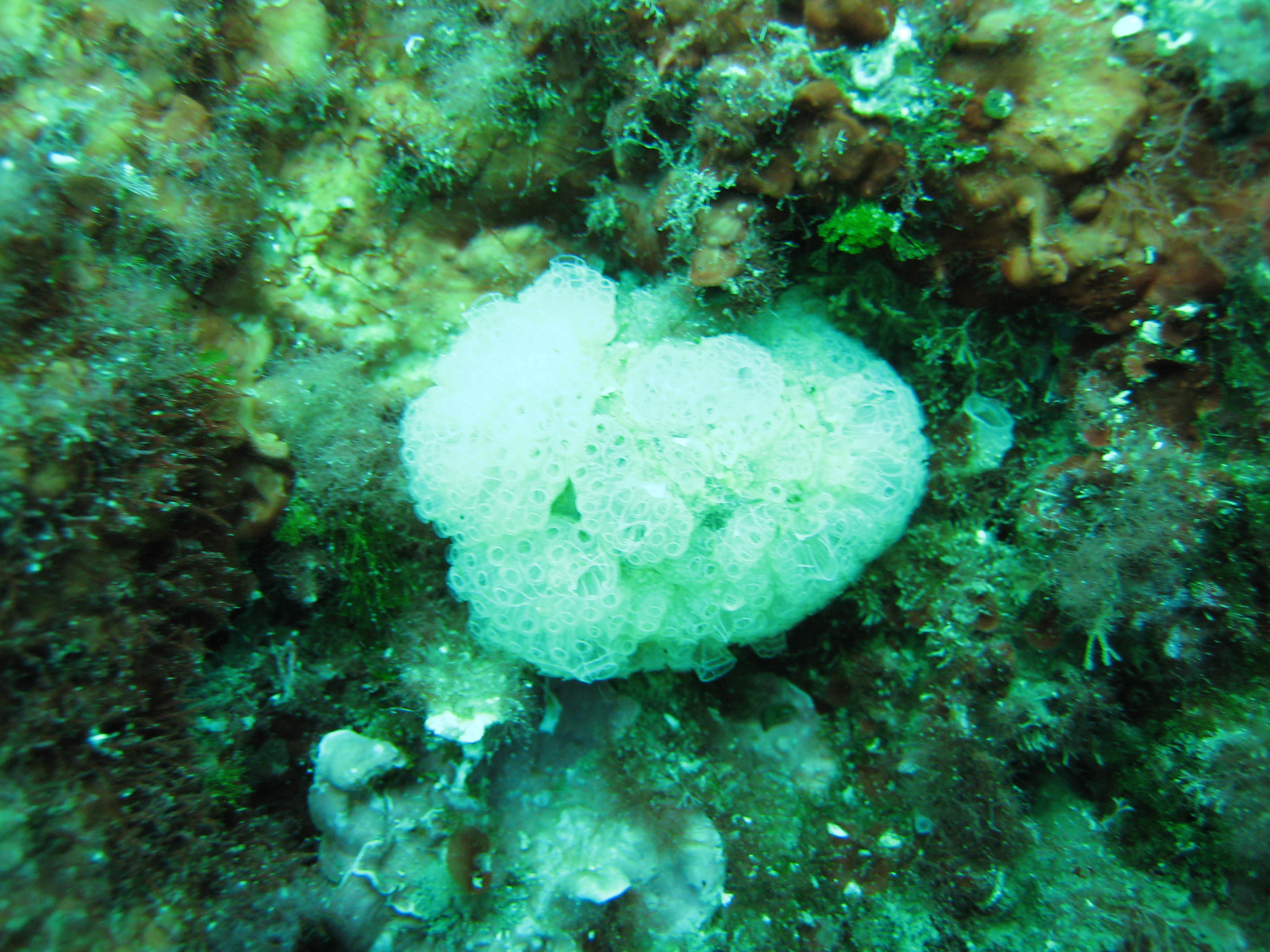
Polyclinum aurantium

- Aplidium densum
- Aplidium elegans
- Aplidium glabrum
- Aplidium nordmanni
- Aplidium pallidum
- Aplidium proliferum
- Aplidium punctum
- Aplidium turbinatum
- Morchellium argus (red-flake ascidian)
- Polyclinum aurantium
- Synoicum incrustatum
- Synoicum pulmonaria

==== Family Pycnoclavellidae ====
- Pycnoclavella aurilucens
- Pycnoclavella producta
- Pycnoclavella stolonialis

=== Order Phlebobranchia ===
==== Family Ascidiidae ====
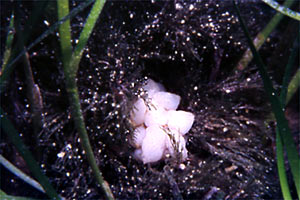
Phallusia mammillata

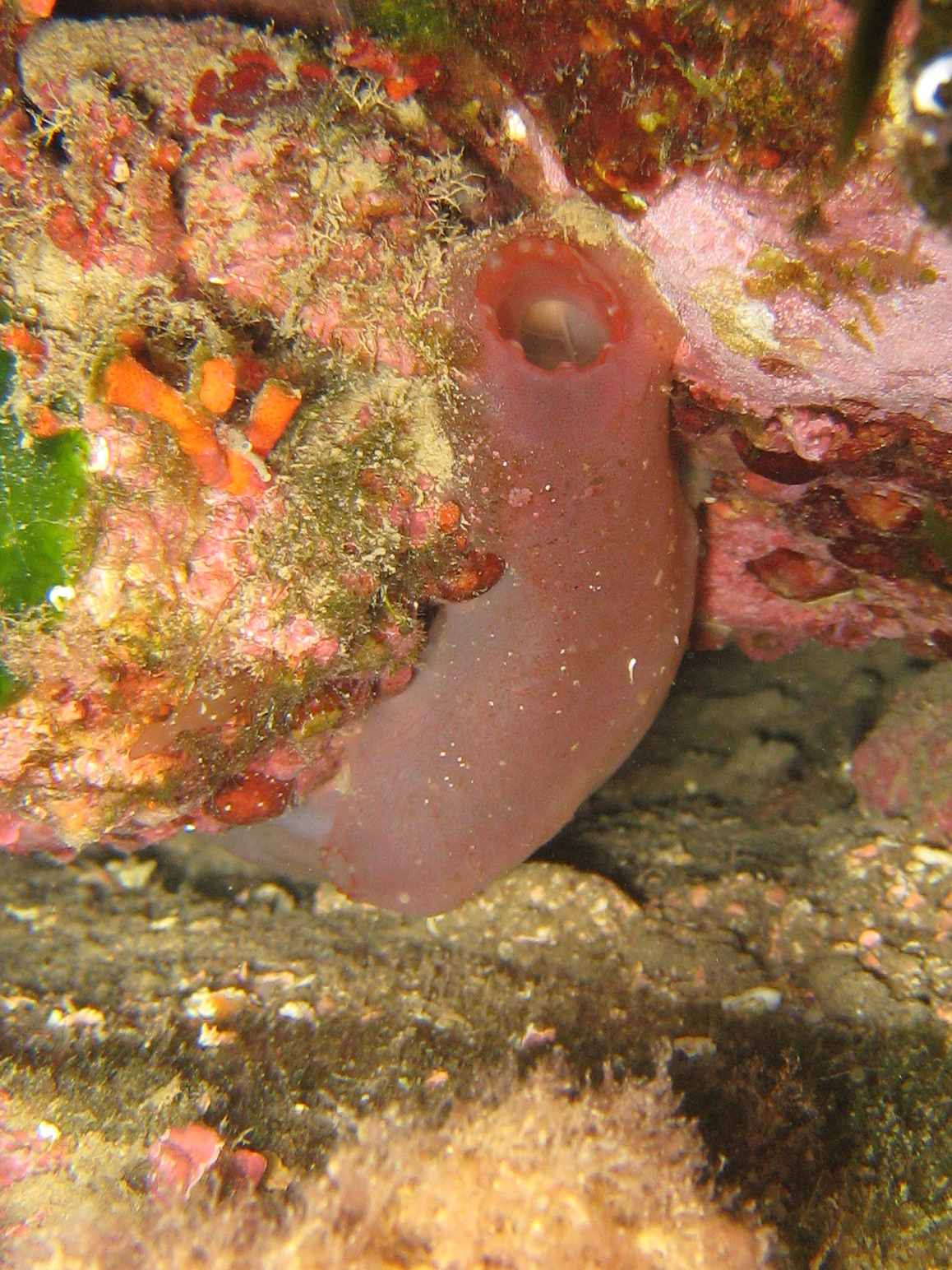
Ascidia mentula

- Ascidia conchilega
- Ascidia mentula
- Ascidia virginea
- Ascidiella aspersa
- Ascidiella scabra
- Phallusia mammillata

==== Family Cionidae ====
- Ciona intestinalis (vase tunicate)

==== Family Corellidae ====
- Corella eumyota
- Corella parallelogramma

==== Family Diazonidae ====
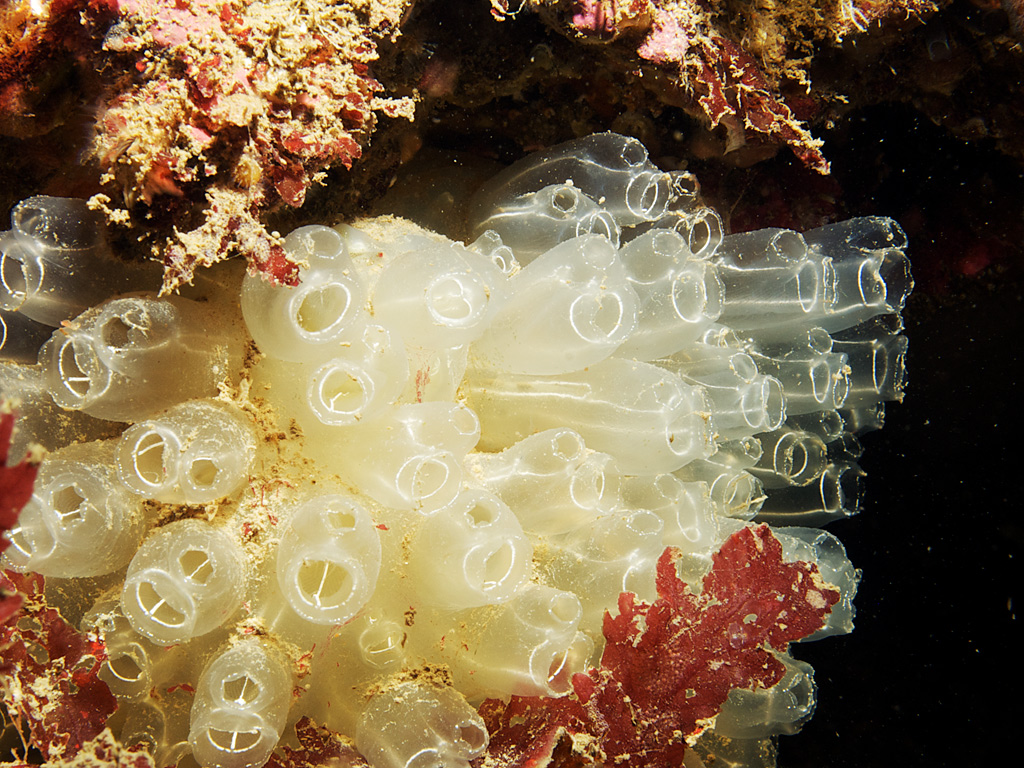
Diazona violacea

- Diazona violacea

==== Family Perophoridae ====
- Perophora listeri

=== Order Pleurogona ===
==== Family Styelidae ====
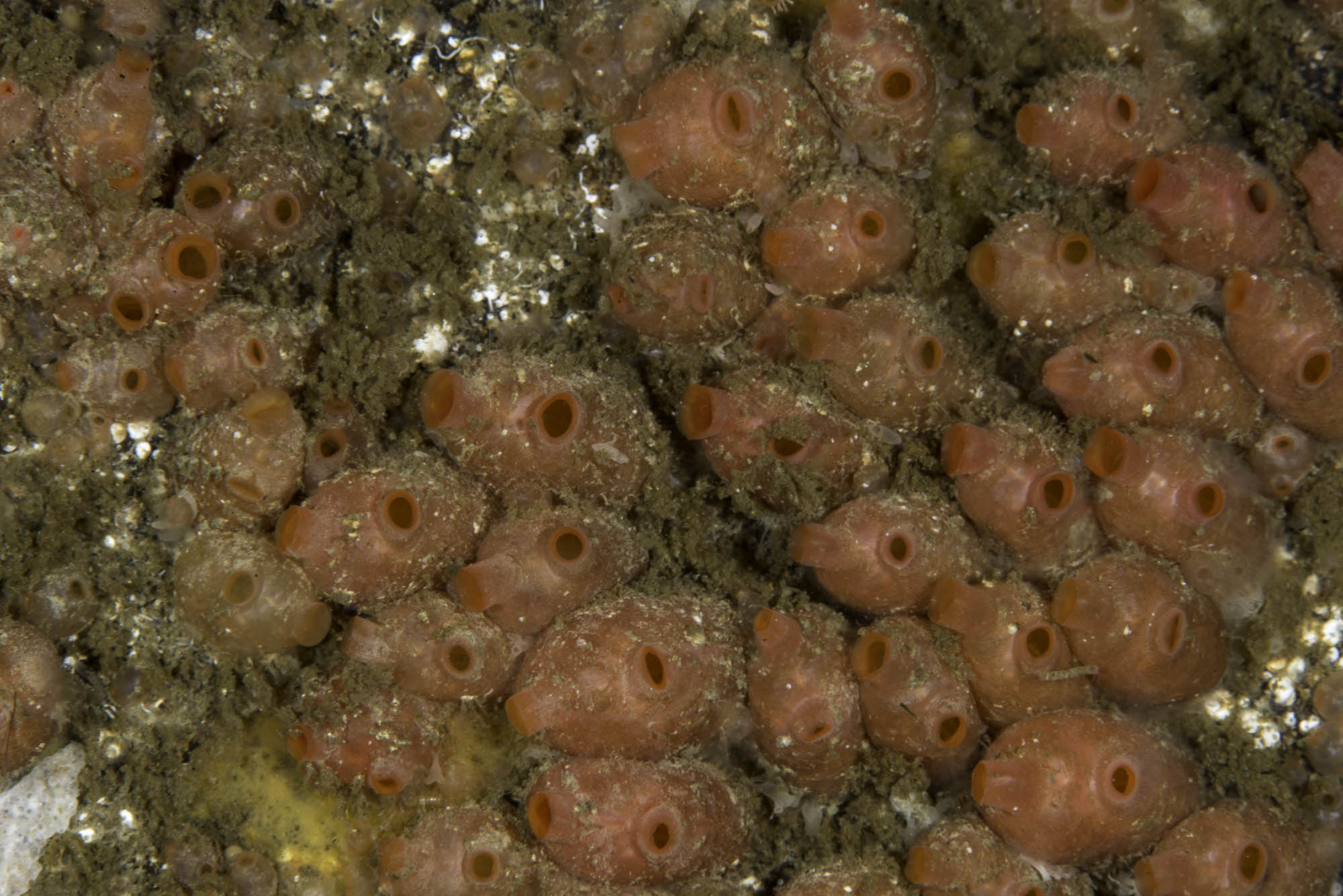
Dendrodoa grossularia

- Botrylloides leachii
- Botryllus schlosseri (star ascidian / golden star tunicate)
- Dendrodoa grossularia
- Distomus variolosus
- Polycarpa fibrosa
- Polycarpa gracilis
- Polycarpa pomaria
- Polycarpa scuba
- Stolonica socialis
- Styela clava (stalked sea squirt, club sea squirt, club tunicate, Asian tunicate, leathery sea squirt, rough sea squirt)
- Styela coriacea

=== Order Stolidobranchia ===
==== Family Molgulidae (sea grapes) ====
- Molgula citrina
- Molgula complanata
- Molgula manhattensis
- Molgula occulta
- Molgula oculata (sea grape)

==== Family Pyuridae ====
- Boltenia echinata
- Microcosmus claudicans
- Pyura microcosmus
- Pyura squamulosa
- Pyura tessellata

Pelagic tunicates (free-swimming)

== Class Appendicularia (larvaceans) ==
=== Order Copelata ===
==== Family Oikopleuridae ====
5 species

==== Family Fritillariidae ====
4 species

== Class Thaliacea (pelagic tunicates) ==
=== Order Doliolida ===
==== Family Doliolidae ====
3 species

=== Order Salpida (salps) ===
==== Family Salpidae (salps) ====
7 species

=== Order Pyrosomida (pyrosomes) ===
==== Family Pyrosomatidae (pyrosomes) ====
1 species
