= Donald I. Williamson =

British zoologist

Donald Irving Williamson (8 January 1922, in Alnham, England – 29 January 2016, in Port Erin, Isle of Man) was a British planktologist and carcinologist.

== Education ==
Williamson gained his first degree from the Newcastle division of Durham University in 1942. He earned his PhD studying Talitrus saltator from the same university in 1948, and a DSc from Newcastle University in 1972. He worked at the Port Erin Marine Laboratory of the University of Liverpool from 1948 to 1997, and published on Irish Sea plankton, crustacean behaviour and taxonomy, and crustacean larvae.

== Works ==
He also published speculative works on hybridisation in evolution: Larvae and Evolution (1992, a book foreworded by Lynn Margulis and Alfred I. Tauber), The Origins of Larvae (2003, a revised and extended edition of Larvae and Evolution, not to be confounded with his 2007 article of same title published in the magazine American Scientist), and some articles on the same subject.

In Larvae and Evolution Williamson developed a controversial hypothesis proposing the acquisition of larval stages in some marine organisms by hybridisation between two distant animal species (a speciation process referred to as hybridogenesis by Williamson). The fraction of the genome of one of the contributor species would be restricted to lead the developmental program of a newly acquired larva whereas the genome of the other contributor would drive the development of most of the adult anatomical structures. During the following years he would generalise his theory to other animal groups featuring a holometabolous development.

According to Williamson, these successful hybridisations would most likely occur in organisms with external fertilisation or male gamete dispersal. He acknowledges in his work Larvae and Evolution that he has borrowed the idea of hybridogenesis from the well-known process of interspecific hybridisation that takes place in plants. Hybrid plants generated from phylogenetically distant species can often give rise to new species if the hybrids become reproductively isolated from the progenitor populations.

In one of his articles Williamson contends that:

1. There were no true larvae until after the establishment of classes in the respective phyla,
2. Early animals hybridised to produce chimeras of parts of dissimilar species,
3. The Cambrian explosion resulted from many such hybridisations,
4. Modern animal phyla and classes were produced by such early hybridisations, rather than by the gradual accumulation of specific differences.

To prove the possibility of such hybridizations, Williamson claimed to have succeeded in 1990 in fertilizing sea squirt eggs with sperm from a sea urchin (a species from a different phylum). However, it was later shown that the alleged hybrids were simply sea urchins.

Williamson's hypothesis was reviewed in the companion website for the eighth edition of the textbook Developmental Biology.

=== Reception of the larval transfer theory ===
In an article published in the journal Proceedings of the National Academy of Sciences in 2009, Williamson claimed that the body plan of the adult butterfly and its caterpillar larval stage evolved separately in different organisms; then, their phylogenies would eventually merge by hybridisation at a more recent point of their evolutionary history. The study was communicated by Lynn Margulis, via a submission route that at that time allowed academy members of the United States National Academy of Sciences to manage the peer review of a colleague's manuscript. The acceptance for publication led to accusations of "nepotism" and "nonsense" science. Margulis maintained that Williamson's paper was scientifically sound and was only being censured because it didn't adhere to Darwinian orthodoxy. "We don't ask anyone to accept Williamson's ideas – only to evaluate them on the basis of science and scholarship, not knee-jerk prejudice", said Margulis.

Williamson's hypothesis was rebutted in response papers in the same journal issue by the biologists Michael W. Hart and Richard K. Grosberg and Gonzalo Giribet (Curator of Invertebrates in the Museum of Comparative Zoology at Harvard University) and later by Arnab De and Rituparna Bose. Even though the latter authors rectified some of the signs considered by Williamson as molecular evidence of an ancestral hybridogenesis, they recommended a laboratory hybridisation study between an onychophore and a cockroach, as proposed by Williamson.

== See also ==
- Interspecific hybrids
- Hybrids in nature
- Hybrid plants
- Codon usage bias
- Heterosis
- Gene flow
- Introgression
- Francis Maitland Balfour
