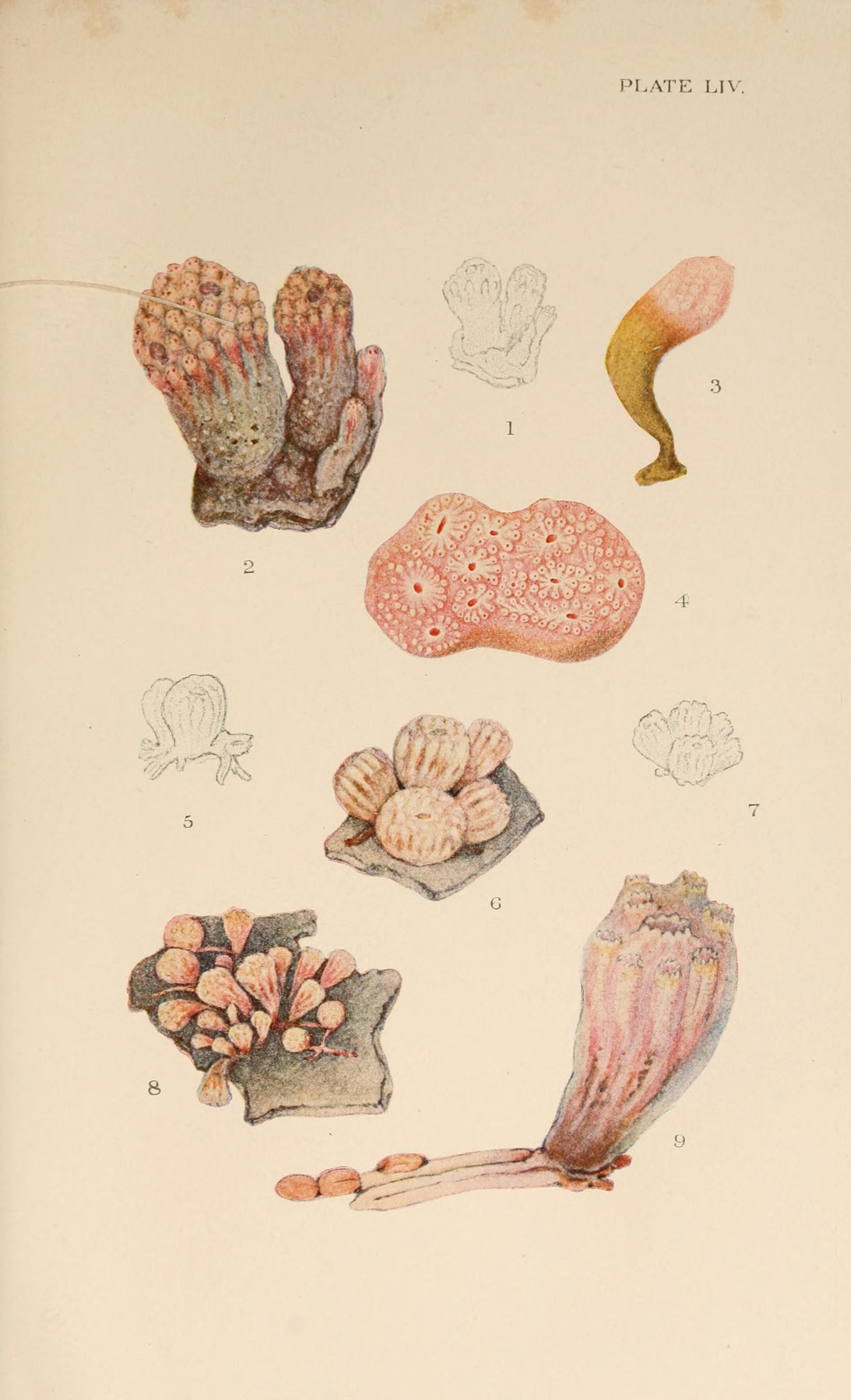
- Morchellium argus, illustrations at top

Scientific classification
- Kingdom: Animalia
- Phylum: Chordata
- Subphylum: Tunicata
- Class: Ascidiacea
- Order: Aplousobranchia
- Family: Polyclinidae
- Genus: Morchellium; Giard, 1872

Species
- See text

= Morchellium =

Genus of sea squirts

Morchellium is a genus of colonial sea squirts, tunicates in the family Polyclinidae.

== Species ==
The World Register of Marine Species lists the following species:

- Morchellium albidum Kott, 1992
- Morchellium appendiculatum (Michaelsen, 1923)
- Morchellium argus (Milne-Edwards, 1841)
- Morchellium giardi Herdman, 1886
- Morchellium leviventer (Monniot & Gaill, 1978)
- Morchellium pannosum Kott, 1992
