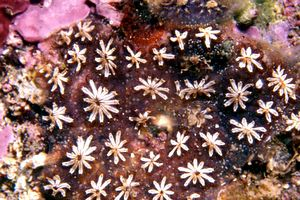
- Botryllus schlosseri

Scientific classification
- Kingdom: Animalia
- Phylum: Chordata
- Subphylum: Tunicata
- Class: Ascidiacea
- Order: Stolidobranchia
- Family: Styelidae
- Genus: Botryllus; Gaertner, 1774

Species
- See text

= Botryllus =

Genus of sea squirts

Botryllus is a genus of colonial ascidian tunicates in the family Styelidae.

== Species ==
Species in this genus include:

- Botryllus arenaceus Monniot, 1988
- Botryllus aster Monniot, 1991
- Botryllus closionis Monniot, Monniot, Griffiths & Schleyer, 2001
- Botryllus compositus Tokioka, 1967
- Botryllus delicatus Okuyama & Saito, 2001
- Botryllus eilatensis Shenkar & Monniot, 2006
- Botryllus elegans (Quoy & Gaimard, 1834)
- Botryllus firmus Monniot & Monniot, 1996
- Botryllus gregalis (Sluiter, 1898)
- Botryllus horridus Saito & Okuyama, 2003
- Botryllus japonicus (Oka, 1931)
- Botryllus leptus Savigny, 1816
- Botryllus maeandrius (Sluiter, 1898)
- Botryllus magnus Ritter, 1901
- Botryllus mortenseni Millar, 1964
- Botryllus ovalis Monniot, 1988
- Botryllus perspicuum Herdman, 1886
- Botryllus planus (Van Name, 1902)
- Botryllus primigenus Oka, 1928
- Botryllus promiscuus Okuyama & Saito, 2002
- Botryllus puniceus Saito & Nagasawa, 2003
- Botryllus renierii (Lamarck, 1815)
- Botryllus rosaceus Savigny, 1816
- Botryllus scalaris Saito & Mukai, 1981
- Botryllus schlosseri (Pallas, 1766)
- Botryllus separatus Sluiter, 1904
- Botryllus sexiensis Saito & Watanabe, 1981
- Botryllus stewartensis Brewin, 1958
- Botryllus stuhlmanni Michaelsen, 1918
- Botryllus tabori Rodrigues, 1962
- Botryllus tuberatus Ritter & Forsyth, 1917
