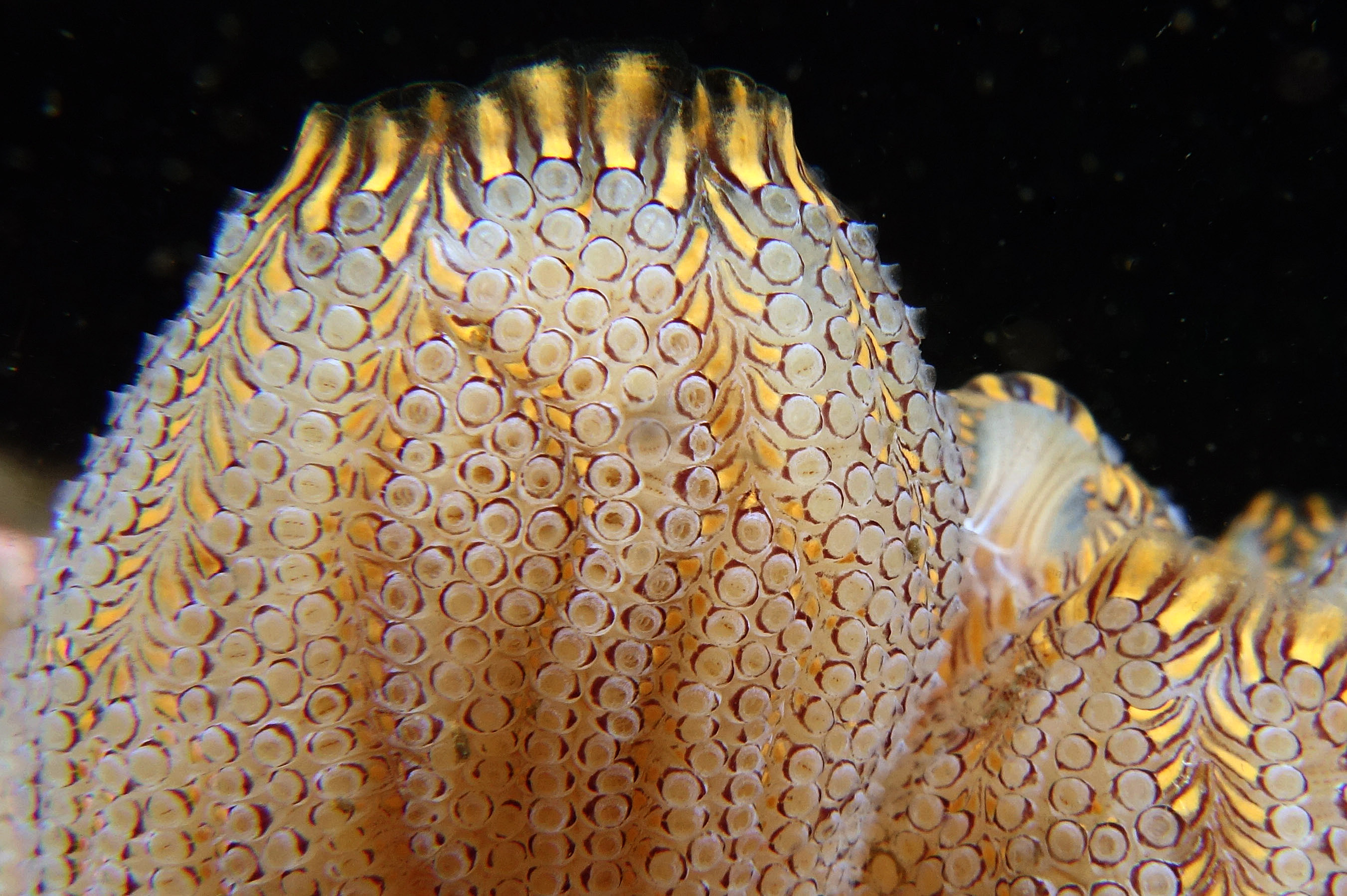
- Botrylloides magnicoecum

Scientific classification
- Kingdom: Animalia
- Phylum: Chordata
- Subphylum: Tunicata
- Class: Ascidiacea
- Order: Stolidobranchia
- Family: Styelidae
- Genus: Botrylloides; Milne-Edwards, 1841

= Botrylloides =

Genus of Ascidiacea

Botrylloides is a genus of ascidian tunicates in the family Styelidae.

== Description ==
Like Botryllus, Botrylloides are flat sheets of organisms which can be found covering ropes, boat hulls, horseshoe crabs, seaweeds, and any still or slow-moving object in saltwater. Also both are considered to be invasive, found in many ports around the world. Invasive tunicates such as these, Didemnum sp., and Styela clava are a problem for shellfish and other marine life populations, and cause fouling of boats and piers.

Species within the genus Botrylloides include:

- Botrylloides anceps (Herdman, 1891)
- Botrylloides aureum (Sars, 1851)
- Botrylloides chevalense Herdman, 1906
- Botrylloides diegensis Ritter & Forsyth, 1917
- Botrylloides fuscus Saito & Watanabe, 1985
- Botrylloides giganteum (PÈrËs, 1949)
- Botrylloides israeliense Brunetti, 2009
- Botrylloides leachii (Savigny, 1816)
- Botrylloides lenis Saito & Watanabe, 1985
- Botrylloides lentus Saito & Watanabe, 1985
- Botrylloides magnicoecum (Hartmeyer, 1912)
- Botrylloides nigrum Herdman, 1886
- Botrylloides perspicuus (Herdman, 1886)
- Botrylloides pizoni Brunetti & Mastrototaro, 2012
- Botrylloides saccus Kott, 2003
- Botrylloides simodensis Saito & Watanabe, 1981
- Botrylloides superbum (Drasche, 1883)
- Botrylloides tyreum Herdman, 1886
- Botrylloides violaceus Oka, 1927

Species names currently considered to be synonyms:

- Botrylloides albicans Milne Edwards, 1841: synonym of Botrylloides leachii (Savigny, 1816)
- Botrylloides aurantium Oka, 1927: synonym of Botryllus aurantius (Oka, 1927)
- Botrylloides aurea Sars, 1851: synonym of Botrylloides aureum (Sars, 1851)
- Botrylloides boloniense Giard, 1875: synonym of Botrylloides leachii (Savigny, 1816)
- Botrylloides carnosum Oka, 1927: synonym of Botrylloides violaceus Oka, 1927
- Botrylloides chazaliei Sluiter, 1898: synonym of Botrylloides nigrum Herdman, 1886
- Botrylloides clavelina Giard, 1872: synonym of Botrylloides leachii (Savigny, 1816)
- Botrylloides cyanescens Giard, 1888: synonym of Botrylloides leachii (Savigny, 1816)
- Botrylloides diegense Ritter & Forsyth, 1917: synonym of Botrylloides diegensis Ritter & Forsyth, 1917
- Botrylloides eligulatum Beniaminson, 1975: synonym of Botryllus tuberatus Ritter & Forsyth, 1917
- Botrylloides fulgurale Herdman, 1886: synonym of Botrylloides leachii (Savigny, 1816)
- Botrylloides gregalis Sluiter, 1898: synonym of Botryllus gregalis (Sluiter, 1898)
- Botrylloides insigne Giard, 1872: synonym of Botrylloides leachii (Savigny, 1816)
- Botrylloides lateritium Beniaminson, 1975: synonym of Botrylloides violaceus Oka, 1927
- Botrylloides leachi (Savigny, 1816): synonym of Botrylloides leachii (Savigny, 1816)
- Botrylloides leptum Herdman, 1899: synonym of Botrylloides leachii (Savigny, 1816)
- Botrylloides maeandrium Sluiter, 1898: synonym of Botryllus maeandrius (Sluiter, 1898)
- Botrylloides maeandrius Sluiter, 1898: synonym of Botryllus maeandrius (Sluiter, 1898)
- Botrylloides magnicoecus Hartmeyer, 1912: synonym of Botrylloides magnicoecum (Hartmeyer, 1912)
- Botrylloides magnum (Ritter, 1901): synonym of Botryllus magnus Ritter, 1901
- Botrylloides magnus : synonym of Botryllus magnus Ritter, 1901
- Botrylloides meandrinum Sluiter: synonym of Botryllus maeandrius (Sluiter, 1898)
- Botrylloides namei (Hartmeyer & Michaelsen, 1928): synonym of Botryllus planus (Van Name, 1902)
- Botrylloides niger Herdman, 1886: synonym of Botrylloides nigrum Herdman, 1886
- Botrylloides parvulum Huitfeld-Kaas, 1896: synonym of Botrylloides leachii (Savigny, 1816)
- Botrylloides parvulus Huitfeld-Kaas, 1896: synonym of Botrylloides leachii (Savigny, 1816)
- Botrylloides perspicuum Herdman, 1886: synonym of Botrylloides perspicuus (Herdman, 1886)
- Botrylloides planus : synonym of Botryllus planus (Van Name, 1902)
- Botrylloides prostratum Giard, 1872: synonym of Botrylloides leachii (Savigny, 1816)
- Botrylloides purpureum Herdman, 1886: synonym of Botrylloides leachii (Savigny, 1816)
- Botrylloides pusilla Alder, 1863: synonym of Botrylloides leachii (Savigny, 1816)
- Botrylloides radiata Alder & Hancock, 1848: synonym of Botrylloides leachii (Savigny, 1816)
- Botrylloides ramulosa Alder & Hancock, 1848: synonym of Botrylloides leachii (Savigny, 1816)
- Botrylloides rotifera Milne Edwards, 1841: synonym of Botrylloides leachii (Savigny, 1816)
- Botrylloides rubrum Milne Edwards, 1841: synonym of Botrylloides leachii (Savigny, 1816)
- Botrylloides rugosum Gottschaldt, 1894: synonym of Botrylloides aureum (Sars, 1851)
- Botrylloides sparsa Alder, 1863: synonym of Botrylloides leachii (Savigny, 1816)
- Botrylloides translucidum Hartmeyer, 1912: synonym of Botrylloides leachii (Savigny, 1816)
- Botrylloides vinosa Alder & Hancock, 1912: synonym of Botrylloides leachii (Savigny, 1816)
- Botrylloides violaceum Oka, 1927: synonym of Botrylloides violaceus Oka, 1927
