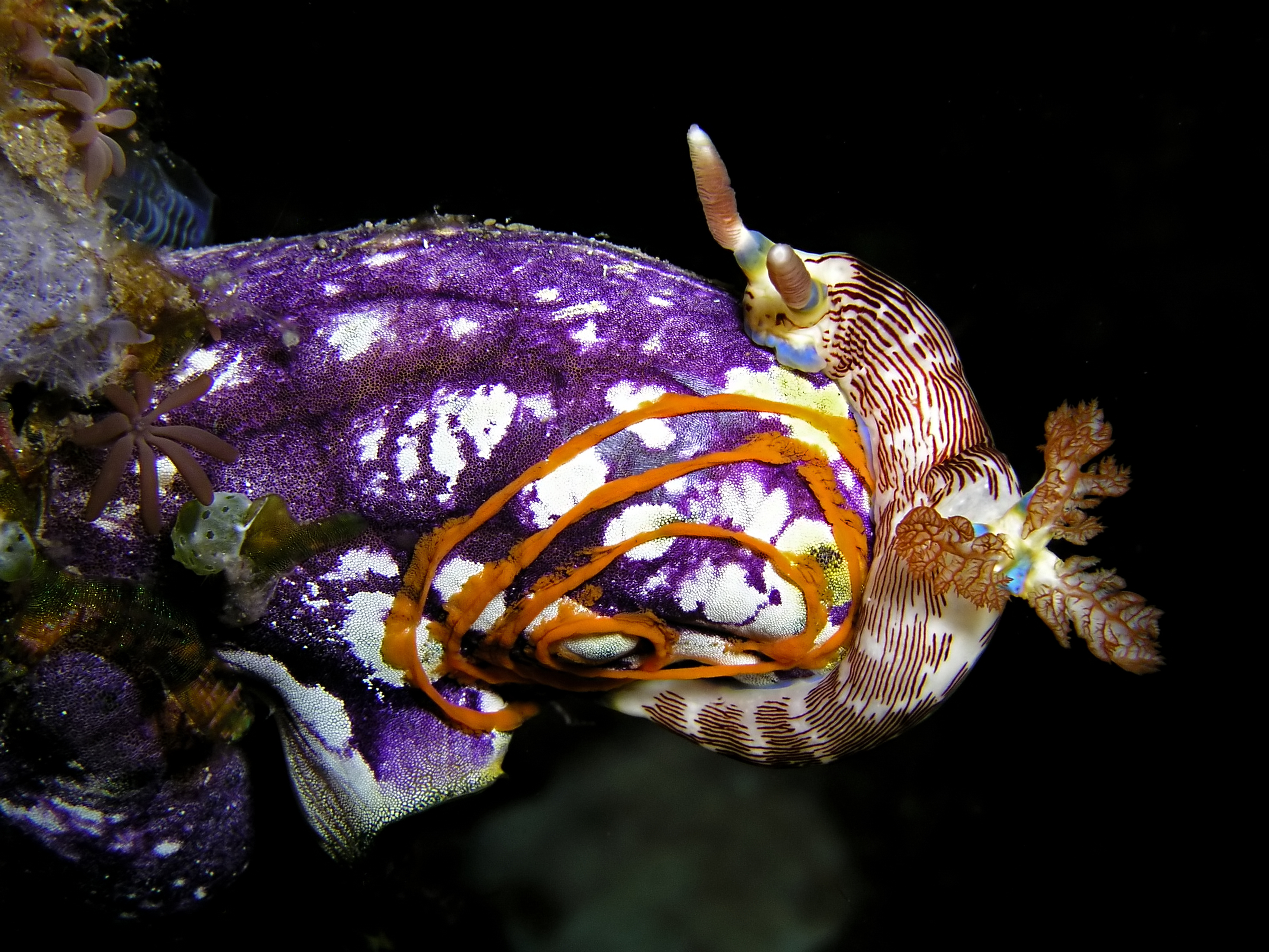
- Polycarpa aurata

Scientific classification
- Kingdom: Animalia
- Phylum: Chordata
- Subphylum: Tunicata
- Class: Ascidiacea
- Order: Stolidobranchia
- Family: Styelidae
- Genus: Polycarpa; Heller, 1877

Species
- See text

= Polycarpa =

Genus of tunicates

Polycarpa is a genus of ascidian tunicates in the family Styelidae.

Species within the genus Polycarpa include:

- Polycarpa aernbaeckae Monniot, 1964
- Polycarpa albatrossi (Van Name, 1912)
- Polycarpa albopunctata (Sluiter, 1904)
- Polycarpa ambonensis (Sluiter, 1904)
- Polycarpa appropinquata (Sluiter, 1898)
- Polycarpa arenosa Monniot & Monniot, 1976
- Polycarpa argentata (Sluiter, 1890)
- Polycarpa arnbackae Monniot F., 1964
- Polycarpa arnoldi (Michaelsen, 1914)
- Polycarpa aspera (Herdman, 1886)
- Polycarpa astromarginata Monniot & Monniot, 2003
- Polycarpa aurata (Quoy & Gaimard, 1834)
- Polycarpa aurita (Sluiter, 1890)
- Polycarpa beuziti Monniot, 1970
- Polycarpa biforis (Sluiter, 1904)
- Polycarpa biscayensis Monniot C. & Monniot F., 1974
- Polycarpa camptos Monniot & Monniot, 2001
- Polycarpa captiosa (Sluiter, 1885)
- Polycarpa carpocincta Monniot & Monniot, 2003
- Polycarpa cartilaginea (Sluiter, 1898)
- Polycarpa caudata Monniot C. & Monniot F., 1974
- Polycarpa chinensis (Tokioka, 1967)
- Polycarpa clavata Hartmeyer, 1919
- Polycarpa colletti Herdman, 1906
- Polycarpa comata (Alder, 1863)
- Polycarpa conchilega (Fleming, 1822)
- Polycarpa contecta (Sluiter, 1904)
- Polycarpa cornogi Glemarec & Monniot, 1966
- Polycarpa cryptocarpa (Sluiter, 1885)
- Polycarpa cylindrocarpa Tokioka, 1970
- Polycarpa decipiens Herdman, 1906
- Polycarpa delta Monniot & Monniot, 1968
- Polycarpa directa Kott, 1990
- Polycarpa discoidea Heller, 1877
- Polycarpa distomaphila Millar, 1953
- Polycarpa divisa (Ostroumov & Pavlenko, 1911)
- Polycarpa ecuadorensis Millar, 1988
- Polycarpa ehrenbergi Hartmeyer, 1916
- Polycarpa errans Hartmeyer, 1909
- Polycarpa fibrosa (Stimpson, 1852)
- Polycarpa flava Kott, 1985
- Polycarpa foresti Monniot, 1970
- Polycarpa fungiformis Herdman, 1898
- Polycarpa glebosa (Sluiter, 1904)
- Polycarpa goreensis (Michaelsen, 1914)
- Polycarpa gracilis Heller, 1877
- Polycarpa gradata Monniot, 2002
- Polycarpa granosa Tokioka, 1953
- Polycarpa hartmeyeri Michaelsen, 1927
- Polycarpa inchacae Monniot & Monniot, 1976
- Polycarpa indiana Monniot & Monniot, 1985
- Polycarpa inhacae Monniot & Monniot, 1976
- Polycarpa insulsa (Sluiter, 1898)
- Polycarpa intonata Kott, 1985
- Polycarpa irregularis Herdman, 1881
- Polycarpa itapoa Rocha & Moreno, 2000
- Polycarpa itera Monniot C. & Monniot F., 1977
- Polycarpa kapala Kott, 1990
- Polycarpa kornogi Glémarec & Monniot C., 1966
- Polycarpa longicarpa Tokioka, 1952
- Polycarpa longiformis Tokioka, 1952
- Polycarpa longitubis Monniot, Monniot & Leung Tack, 1987
- Polycarpa macra Monniot & Monniot, 1991
- Polycarpa maculata Hartmeyer, 1906
- Polycarpa madagascariensis (Michaelsen, 1912)
- Polycarpa mamillaris (Gaertner, 1774)
- Polycarpa maruhi Monniot & Monniot, 1987
- Polycarpa melanosiphonica Tokioka, 1967
- Polycarpa minuta Herdman, 1881
- Polycarpa molguloides Herdman, 1882
- Polycarpa muelleri Brunetti, 2007
- Polycarpa multiplicata Monniot, 1983
- Polycarpa mytiligera (Savigny, 1816)
- Polycarpa natalensis (Sluiter, 1898)
- Polycarpa nigerrima Monniot & Monniot, 2001
- Polycarpa nigricans Heller, 1878
- Polycarpa nota Kott, 1985
- Polycarpa obscura Heller, 1878
- Polycarpa offa Monniot C. & Monniot F., 1988
- Polycarpa olitoria (Sluiter, 1890)
- Polycarpa ovata Pizon, 1908
- Polycarpa palaonensis Tokioka, 1950
- Polycarpa palinorosa (Sluiter, 1895)
- Polycarpa palkensis Herdman, 1906
- Polycarpa papillata Sluiter, 1885
- Polycarpa papyra Kott, 1985
- Polycarpa patens (Sluiter, 1885)
- Polycarpa pedunculata Heller, 1878
- Polycarpa pegasis Michaelsen, 1922
- Polycarpa pentarhiza Monniot F., 1965
- Polycarpa perstellata Monniot & Monniot, 2003
- Polycarpa pigmentata (Herdman, 1906)
- Polycarpa plantei Monniot, 2002
- Polycarpa plenovata Kott, 1985
- Polycarpa pomaria (Savigny, 1816)
- Polycarpa porculus Monniot C. & Monniot F., 1979
- Polycarpa pori Monniot, 2002
- Polycarpa procera (Sluiter, 1885)
- Polycarpa producta Monniot & Monniot, 2003
- Polycarpa psammodes (Sluiter, 1904)
- Polycarpa psammotesta Tokioka, 1953
- Polycarpa pseudoalbatrossi Monniot C. & Monniot F., 1968
- Polycarpa pulvinum Monniot, 1969
- Polycarpa pusilla (Herdman, 1884)
- Polycarpa pustulosa (Sluiter, 1904)
- Polycarpa quadricarpa Millar, 1953
- Polycarpa reniformis (Sluiter, 1904)
- Polycarpa reviviscens Monniot & Monniot, 2001
- Polycarpa richeri Monniot, 1987
- Polycarpa rigida Herdman, 1881
- Polycarpa rima Monniot & Monniot, 1996
- Polycarpa rockallensis Millar, 1982
- Polycarpa rubida (Sluiter, 1898)
- Polycarpa scuba Monniot C., 1971
- Polycarpa seges Kott, 2009
- Polycarpa simplex Tokioka, 1950
- Polycarpa simplicigona Millar, 1975
- Polycarpa sobria (Sluiter, 1904)
- Polycarpa sourieri Peres, 1949
- Polycarpa spiralis (Sluiter, 1885)
- Polycarpa spongiabilis Traustedt, 1883
- Polycarpa stirpes Kott, 1985
- Polycarpa suesana Michaelsen, 1919
- Polycarpa takarazima Tokioka, 1954
- Polycarpa tenera Lacaze-Duthiers & Delage, 1892
- Polycarpa thelyphanes (Sluiter, 1904)
- Polycarpa tinctor (Quoy & Gaimard, 1834)
- Polycarpa tinctorella Kott, 1985
- Polycarpa tokiokai Monniot & Monniot, 1996
- Polycarpa translucida (Peres, 1951)
- Polycarpa triruga Monniot & Monniot, 2003
- Polycarpa tumida Heller, 1878
- Polycarpa twynami Herdman, 1906
- Polycarpa urmeli Sanamyan & Hissmann, 2008
- Polycarpa vankampeni Sluiter, 1919
- Polycarpa violacea (Alder, 1863)
- Polycarpa viridis Herdman, 1880
- Polycarpa willisi Herdman, 1906
- Polycarpa zeteta Millar, 1982

Species names currently considered to be synonyms:

- Polycarpa abjornseni Michaelsen, 1927: synonym of Polyandrocarpa abjornseni (Michaelsen, 1928)
- Polycarpa anguinea (Sluiter, 1898): synonym of Polyandrocarpa anguinea (Sluiter, 1898)
- Polycarpa attollens Herdman, 1899: synonym of Polycarpa papillata Sluiter, 1885
- Polycarpa bassi Herdman, 1886: synonym of Polycarpa obscura Heller, 1878
- Polycarpa capricornia Kott, 1952: synonym of Polycarpa papillata Sluiter, 1885
- Polycarpa circumarata (Sluiter, 1904): synonym of Polycarpa aurita (Sluiter, 1890)
- Polycarpa coccus Michaelsen, 1919: synonym of Eusynstyela miniata (Sluiter, 1905)
- Polycarpa crossogonima Millar, 1962: synonym of Polycarpa arnoldi (Michaelsen, 1914)
- Polycarpa curta Herdman, 1884: synonym of Polycarpa comata (Alder, 1863)
- Polycarpa doderleini Hartmeyer, 1906: synonym of Polycarpa procera (Sluiter, 1885)
- Polycarpa doderleinii Hartmeyer, 1906: synonym of Polycarpa procera (Sluiter, 1885)
- Polycarpa doederleini Hartmeyer, 1906: synonym of Polycarpa procera (Sluiter, 1885)
- Polycarpa elata Heller, 1878: synonym of Polycarpa papillata Sluiter, 1885
- Polycarpa erecta Pizon, 1908: synonym of Polycarpa nigricans Heller, 1878
- Polycarpa finmarckiensis : synonym of Cnemidocarpa finmarkiensis (Kiaer, 1893)
- Polycarpa finmarkiensis Kiaer, 1893: synonym of Cnemidocarpa finmarkiensis (Kiaer, 1893)
- Polycarpa formosa Herdman, 1884: synonym of Polycarpa comata (Alder, 1863)
- Polycarpa fristedti Michaelsen, 1923: synonym of Polycarpa procera (Sluiter, 1885)
- Polycarpa informis (Forbes, 1848): synonym of Polycarpa pomaria (Savigny, 1816)
- Polycarpa intermedia Hartmeyer, 1919: synonym of Polycarpa papillata Sluiter, 1885
- Polycarpa intestinata Kott, 1952: synonym of Polycarpa papillata Sluiter, 1885
- Polycarpa iwayamae Tokioka, 1950: synonym of Polycarpa argentata (Sluiter, 1890)
- Polycarpa libera Kiaer, 1893: synonym of Polycarpa comata (Alder, 1863)
- Polycarpa longisiphonica Herdman, 1881: synonym of Polycarpa rigida Herdman, 1881
- Polycarpa lucilla Kott, 1985: synonym of Polycarpa hartmeyeri Michaelsen, 1927
- Polycarpa marchadi Monniot, 1969: synonym of Polycarpa goreensis (Michaelsen, 1914)
- Polycarpa marioni Peres, 1951: synonym of Polycarpa goreensis (Michaelsen, 1914)
- Polycarpa mayeri Traustedt, 1883: synonym of Polycarpa pomaria (Savigny, 1816)
- Polycarpa miniata (Sluiter, 1905): synonym of Eusynstyela miniata (Sluiter, 1905)
- Polycarpa moebii Michaelsen, 1905: synonym of Polycarpa viridis Herdman, 1880
- Polycarpa monoceros (Moeller, 1842): synonym of Styela rustica Linnaeus, 1767
- Polycarpa multiphiala Verrill, 1900: synonym of Polycarpa spongiabilis Traustedt, 1883
- Polycarpa mutilans Herdman, 1906: synonym of Polycarpa papillata Sluiter, 1885
- Polycarpa nivosa (Sluiter, 1898): synonym of Polycarpa anguinea (Sluiter, 1898)
- Polycarpa obtecta Traustedt, 1883: synonym of Polycarpa spongiabilis Traustedt, 1883
- Polycarpa palinorsa (Sluiter, 1895): synonym of Polycarpa palinorosa (Sluiter, 1895)
- Polycarpa pedata Herdman, 1881: synonym of Cnemidocarpa pedata (Herdman, 1881)
- Polycarpa picteti Pizon, 1908: synonym of Polycarpa pigmentata (Herdman, 1906)
- Polycarpa pilella Herdman, 1881: synonym of Polyandrocarpa pilella (Herdman, 1881)
- Polycarpa polyphlebodes Hartmeyer, 1919: synonym of Polycarpa aurita (Sluiter, 1890)
- Polycarpa quadrata Herdman, 1881: synonym of Cnemidocarpa quadrata (Herdman, 1881)
- Polycarpa radicata Herdman, 1881: synonym of Polycarpa pedunculata Heller, 1878
- Polycarpa rugosa Drasche, 1884: synonym of Polycarpa spongiabilis Traustedt, 1883
- Polycarpa rustica (Linnaeus, 1767): synonym of Styela rustica Linnaeus, 1767
- Polycarpa sabulosa Heller, 1877: synonym of Polycarpa gracilis Heller, 1877
- Polycarpa seriata Michaelsen, 1905: synonym of Polycarpa olitoria (Sluiter, 1890)
- Polycarpa seychellensis (Michaelsen, 1912): synonym of Polycarpa mytiligera (Savigny, 1816)
- Polycarpa sigmilineata Millar, 1975: synonym of Polycarpa decipiens Herdman, 1906
- Polycarpa sluiteri Herdman, 1899: synonym of Polycarpa rigida Herdman, 1881
- Polycarpa solvens (Sluiter, 1895): synonym of Polycarpa olitoria (Sluiter, 1890)
- Polycarpa steindachneri Michaelsen, 1919: synonym of Eusynstyela miniata (Sluiter, 1905)
- Polycarpa sulcata Herdman, 1882: synonym of Polycarpa aurata (Quoy & Gaimard, 1834)
- Polycarpa thelypanes (Sluiter, 1904): synonym of Polycarpa thelyphanes (Sluiter, 1904)
- Polycarpa unilineata Kott, 1952: synonym of Polycarpa obscura Heller, 1878
- Polycarpa varians Heller, 1877: synonym of Polycarpa pomaria (Savigny, 1816)
