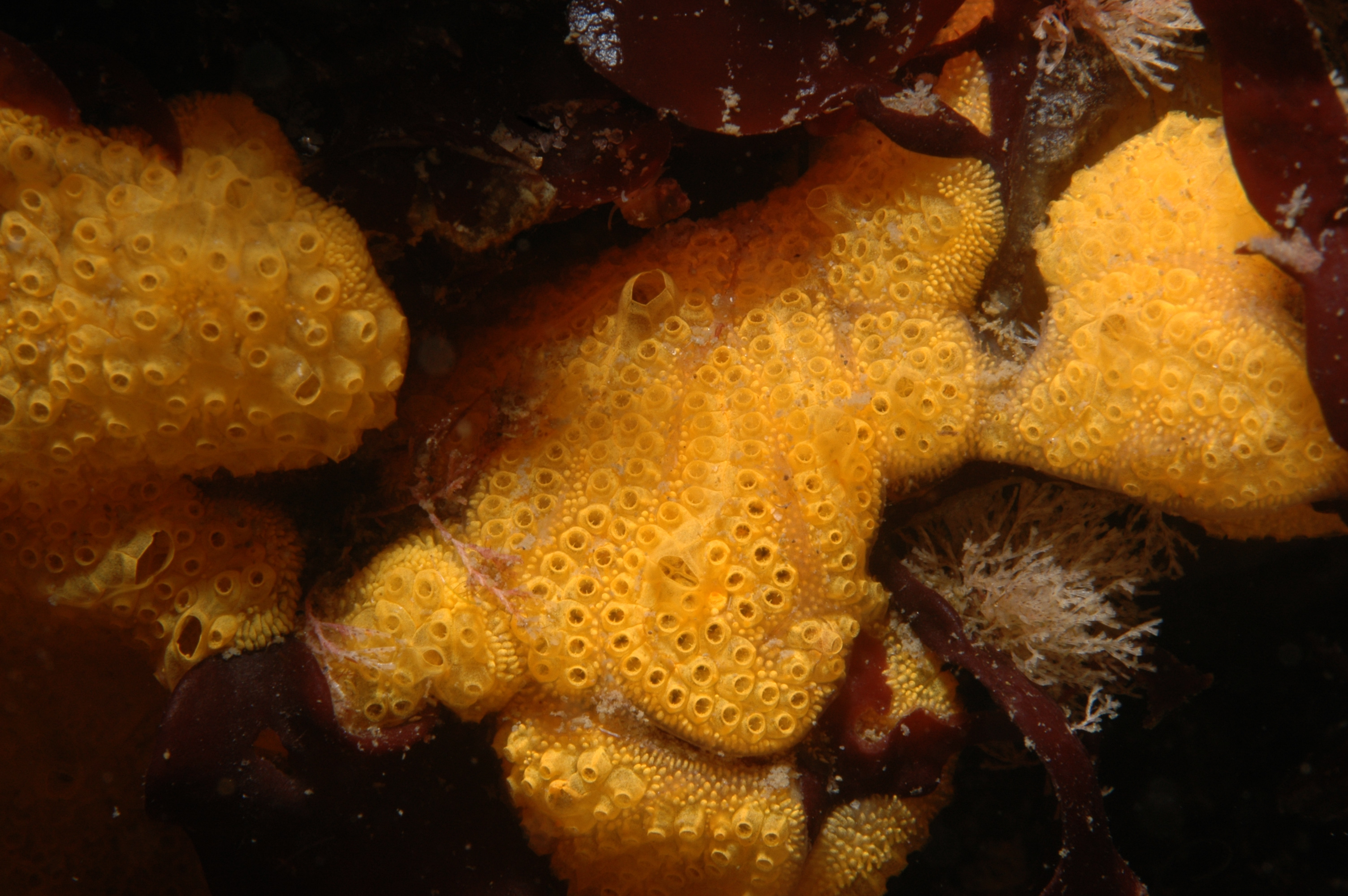
- Botrylloides violaceus

Scientific classification
- Kingdom: Animalia
- Phylum: Chordata
- Subphylum: Tunicata
- Class: Ascidiacea
- Order: Stolidobranchia
- Family: Styelidae
- Genus: Botrylloides
- Species: B. violaceus

Binomial name
- Botrylloides violaceus (Oka, 1927)

= Botrylloides violaceus =

Species of sea squirt

Botrylloides violaceus is a colonial ascidian. It is commonly known as the chain tunicate, but has also been called several other common names, including: lined colonial tunicate, orange sheath tunicate, orange tunicate, and violet tunicate. Its native range is in the northwest Pacific from southern China to Japan and Siberia. Colonies grow on solid substrates and consist of individuals arranged in twisting rows. Outside its native range, it is considered an invasive species and is becoming more common in coastal waters of North America and other waters around the world, likely being spread by shipping activity.

In the San Francisco Bay area, B. violaceus can be readily found on boat docks in the Richmond Marina. The ecological impact of B. violaceus in this region remains unknown.

== Morphology ==
Zooids are embedded in a transparent tunic and connected by a network of blood vessels that terminate in ampullae (small sac-like structures) at the periphery of the colony. Colony color varies from bright orange to reddish or dull purple. These tunicates usually have 8 branchial tentacles and 11 rows of stigmata.

== Significance ==
Colonial ascidians are the only known chordates capable of regenerating all body tissues. Because of chordates' close developmental relationship to vertebrates, the regenerative processes in colonial ascidians are of great interest to researchers. Whole body regeneration can be observed in B. violaceus after removal of all body tissues except the peripheral vasculature, suggesting the presence of circulating pluripotent or totipotent stem cells in the blood. The first draft genome of B. violaceus was published in 2023.
