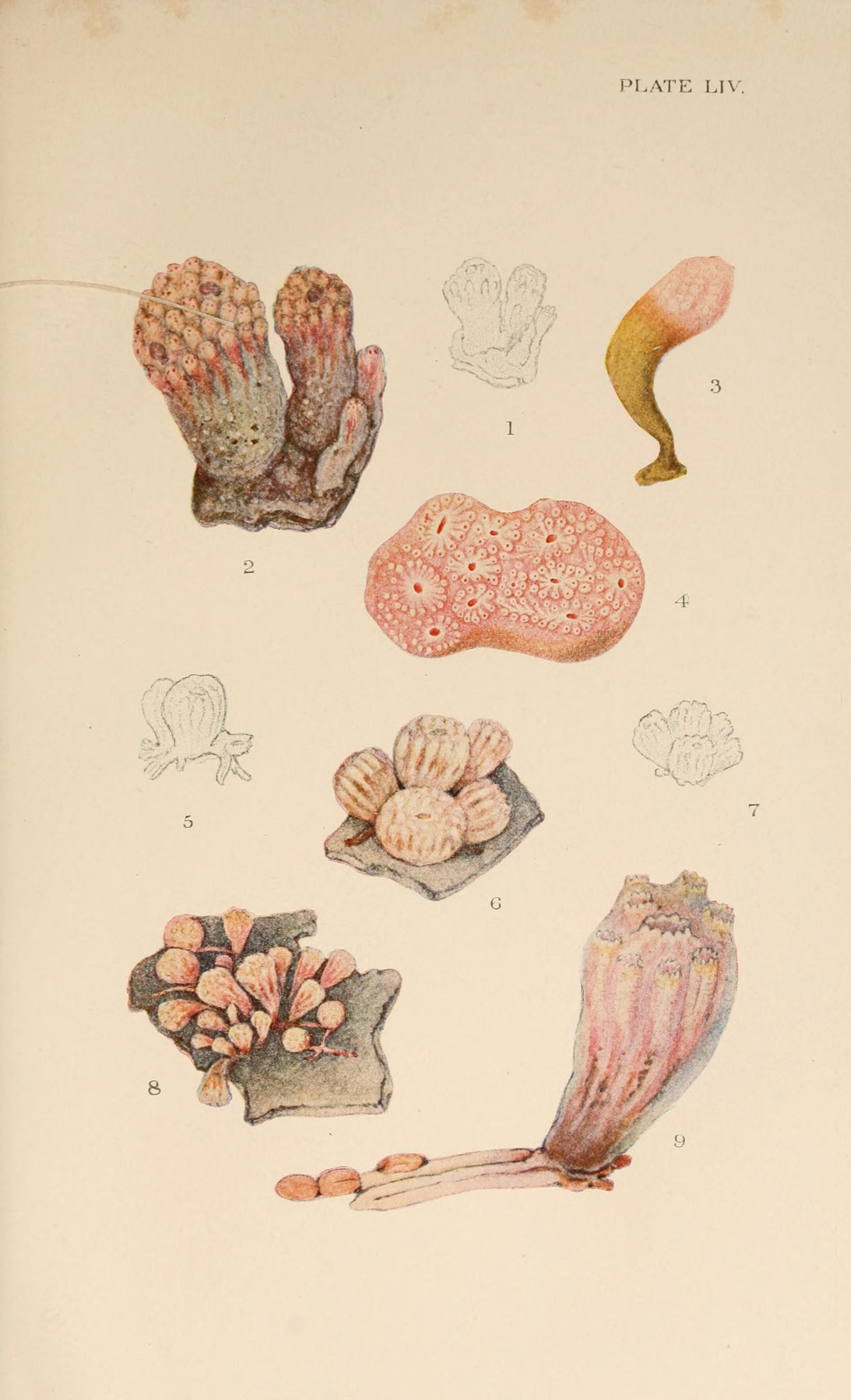
- Morchellium argus, illustrations at top

Scientific classification
- Kingdom: Animalia
- Phylum: Chordata
- Subphylum: Tunicata
- Class: Ascidiacea
- Order: Aplousobranchia
- Family: Polyclinidae
- Genus: Morchellium
- Species: M. argus

Binomial name
- Morchellium argus (Milne-Edwards, 1841)

Synonyms
- Amaroucium argus'' Milne-Edwards, 1841; Aplidium argus (Milne-Edwards, 1841)

= Morchellium argus =

Species of sea squirt

Morchellium argus, the red-flake ascidian, is a species of colonial sea squirt, a tunicate in the family Polyclinidae. It is native to shallow water in the northeastern Atlantic Ocean, especially round the coasts of Britain.

== Description ==
A colony of Morchellium argus consists of a clump of vase-shaped zooids up to 4 cm (1.6 in) long, each supported by a conical stalk about 1 cm (0.4 in) wide, to which sand adheres. Each zooid has a buccal siphon with eight flaps and a tongue-like process underneath. This siphon opens into a large pharynx through which water is drawn into the interior, but the colony has a single exit siphon through which the water from several zooids is expelled. The zooids are translucent white, pale pink, or red, and there are four small red spots at the entrance to the pharynx, which distinguishes this tunicate from similar species.

== Distribution and habitat ==
Morchellium argus is native to the northeastern Atlantic Ocean. It is common round the coasts of Britain, as far north as the Shetland Isles. It is also known from the west of France including Arcachon Bay. It is found at depths down to about 10 m (33 ft) mainly in caves, under overhangs and on vertical surfaces, often among foliose algae.

== Biology ==
Morchellium argus draws in water through its buccal siphon, filters out zooplankton and other food particles and then expels the water. Gas exchange takes place at the same time.

Morchellium argus is a hermaphrodite. The gonads are in the body cavity and sperm passes out with the exhalent water. When this sperm is drawn into another individual zooid, internal fertilisation can occur. The early developmental stages take place inside the zooid and the larvae are later liberated into the sea. After a short free-living stage, these attach themselves to a surface, undergo metamorphosis, and start a new colony. Further development is by budding of new zooids. The function of the red spots in the pharynx is unclear.
