= Polycarpa scuba =

Scientific classification
- Kingdom: Animalia
- Phylum: Chordata
- Subphylum: Tunicata
- Class: Ascidiacea
- Order: Stolidobranchia
- Family: Styelidae
- Genus: Polycarpa
- Species: P. scuba

Binomial name
- Polycarpa scuba Monniot, C. 1971

Species of sea squirt

Polycarpa scuba is a species of tunicate or sea squirt in the family Styelidae. It is native to the northeastern Atlantic Ocean where it lives on the seabed.

== Distribution and habitat ==
Polycarpa scuba is found in the northeastern Atlantic Ocean.
