= Polycarpa fibrosa =

Scientific classification
- Kingdom: Animalia
- Phylum: Chordata
- Subphylum: Tunicata
- Class: Ascidiacea
- Order: Stolidobranchia
- Family: Styelidae
- Genus: Polycarpa
- Species: P. fibrosa

Binomial name
- Polycarpa fibrosa (Stimpson, 1852)

Synonyms
- Glandula fibrosa Stimpson, 1852; Glandula tubularis Sars, 1859; Pandocia fibrosa (Stimpson, 1852); Tethyum fibrosum (Stimpson, 1852)

Species of sea squirt

Polycarpa fibrosa is a species of tunicate in the family Styelidae. It is brown and globular and its outer surface is covered with a mat of fibrils. It normally lies buried in soft sediment on the seabed with only its two siphons protruding. It occurs in the Arctic Ocean and northern Atlantic Ocean. P. fibrosa was first identified and described by the American malacologist William Stimpson in 1852.

== Description ==
Polycarpa fibrosa is globular or ovoid in shape and is about 35 mm (1.4 in) in diameter. It has a sac-like body with a tough covering known as a tunic, and is densely clad in short fibrils. There are two long, tapering, four-lobed siphons on the upper surface. Water is drawn into the body cavity through one of these, the buccal siphon, and expelled through the atrial siphon. The buccal siphon has a ring of up to 60 tentacles round the rim. These function to prevent particles that are too large from being drawn into the body cavity. This tunicate is a brownish colour and is well camouflaged, as particles of sand, shell fragments and mud adhere to the fibrils. It is usually partially buried in the sediment on the seabed with the two siphons projecting.

== Distribution ==
This species is found in the boreal-arctic region. Its range includes the Arctic Ocean and North Atlantic, the Mediterranean Sea, the North Sea, the Gulf of Saint Lawrence, the Bay of Fundy and the Gulf of Maine. It lives loosely attached to the seabed on soft sediment at depths varying between shallow water and over 1,000 metres (3,300 ft). It prefers clean gravel, or coarse sand and shell gravel, which is in contrast to the rather similar Molgula occulta which favours muddy sediments and Molgula oculata which is found among coarser material.

== Biology ==
Polycarpa fibrosa is a hermaphrodite and is viviparous. Sperm is shed into the sea and sucked in through the buccal siphon of another individual, a batch of eggs is liberated from the oviduct, and fertilisation takes place within the body cavity. The eggs are opaque with pigmented yolks and are about 0.16 mm (0.006 in) in diameter. The developing embryos are brooded in the body cavity. Hatching is initiated by the release of enzymes which rupture the egg membranes. The larvae have notochords (stiffening rods) and resemble salamander tadpoles. They have fluid-filled sensory organs known as otocysts. The larvae continue to be brooded at first but are later liberated into the sea. After a short free-swimming period, they sink to the seabed, their tails are absorbed, they lose their notochords and undergo metamorphosis into the adult form.
