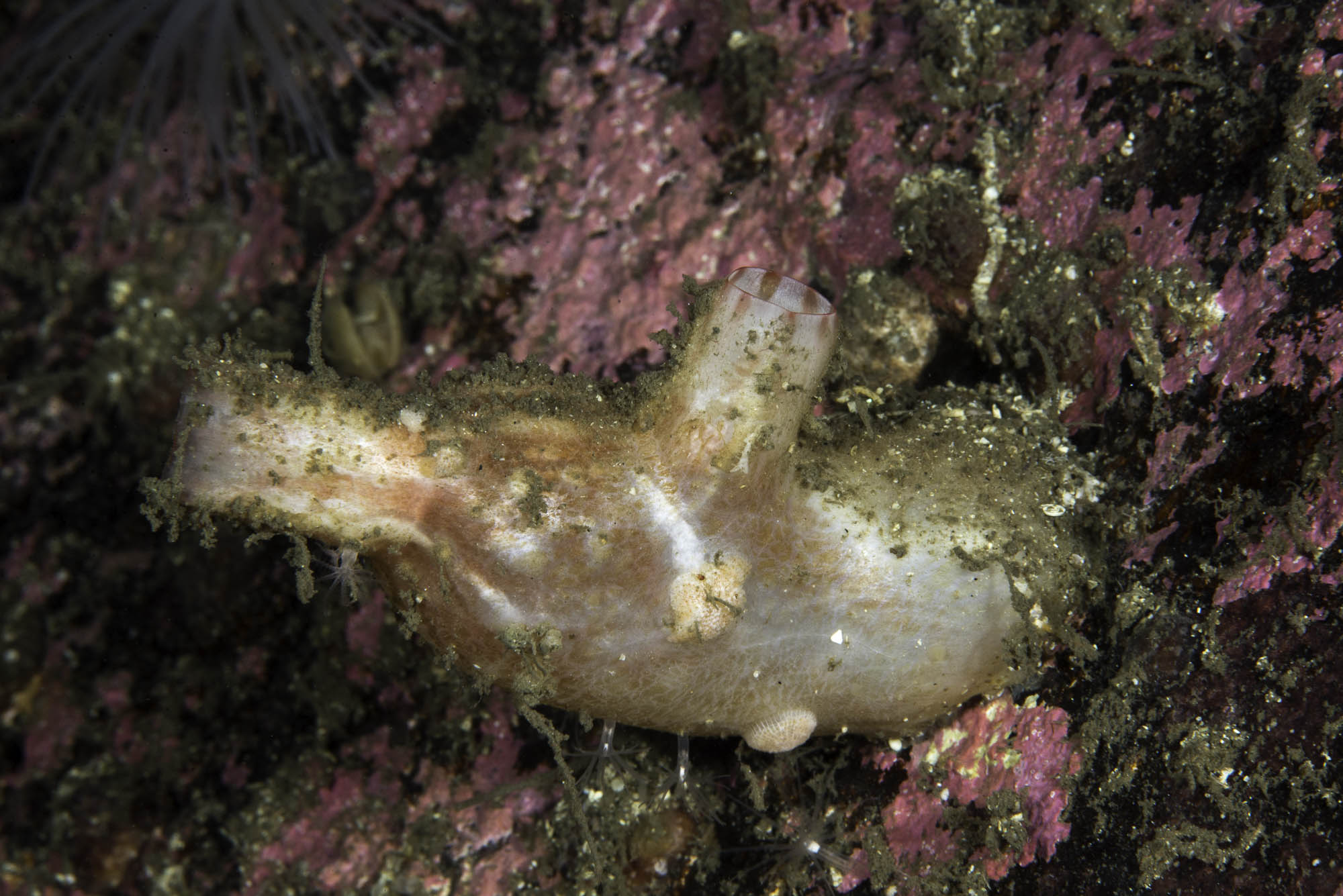
- The sea squirt Polycarpa pomaria, Gulen, Norway.

Scientific classification
- Kingdom: Animalia
- Phylum: Chordata
- Subphylum: Tunicata
- Class: Ascidiacea
- Order: Stolidobranchia
- Family: Styelidae
- Genus: Polycarpa
- Species: P. pomaria

Binomial name
- Polycarpa pomaria (Savigny, 1816)

Synonyms
- Cynthia granulata Alder, 1863; Cynthia pomaria Savigny, 1816; Cynthia quadrangularis (Forbes, 1848); Cynthia sulcatula Alder, 1863; Cynthia tuberosa MacGillivray, 1844; Pandocia pomaria (Savigny, 1816); Polycarpa informis (Forbes, 1848); Polycarpa mayeri Traustedt, 1883; Polycarpa varians Heller, 1877; Pyura scabriscula Sars, 1870; Styela apalina Alder & Hancock, 1907; Styela granulata (Alder, 1863); Styela informis Forbes, 1848; Styela opalina Alder, 1863; Styela quadrangularis Forbes, 1848; Styela sulcatula (Alder, 1863); Styela tuberosa (MacGillivray, 1844)

= Polycarpa pomaria =

Species of sea squirt

Polycarpa pomaria is a species of tunicate or sea squirt in the family Styelidae. It is native to the northeastern Atlantic Ocean where it lives on the seabed at depths down to about 450 metres (1,500 ft).

== Description ==
Polycarpa pomaria is a solitary tunicate with a conical, ovoid or globular form, growing to a length of about 7 centimetres (2.8 in). The buccal siphon at the apex has four lobes and is surrounded by about 56 tentacles of various sizes. The atrial siphon is on the side and also has four lobes. The test or tunic is brown, wrinkled and leathery, with many fleshy papillae. Internally the body wall has numerous drop-shaped gonads (called polycarps) and the pharynx wall is perforated with many bands of stigmata (slits).

== Distribution and habitat ==
Polycarpa pomaria is found in the northeastern Atlantic Ocean and the North Sea. Its range extends from Norway and Spitsbergen southwards to the Mediterranean Sea. It occurs on rocks and other hard surfaces and its depth range is from the subtidal zone down to about 450 metres (1,500 ft).

== Biology ==
Like other sea squirts, Polycarpa pomaria feeds by drawing water in through its buccal siphon, filtering out the planktonic particles and expelling the water through its atrial siphon.

Polycarpa pomaria is viviparous and a few eggs at a time are fertilised within the atrium (body cavity) with sperm that is drawn in with the feeding current. The tadpole larvae lie quiescent as they develop inside the atrium but when they are expelled, they suddenly become active and very soon undergo metamorphosis into juveniles. Many undergo metamorphosis while still in the atrial chamber, and sometimes the whole batch does this.
