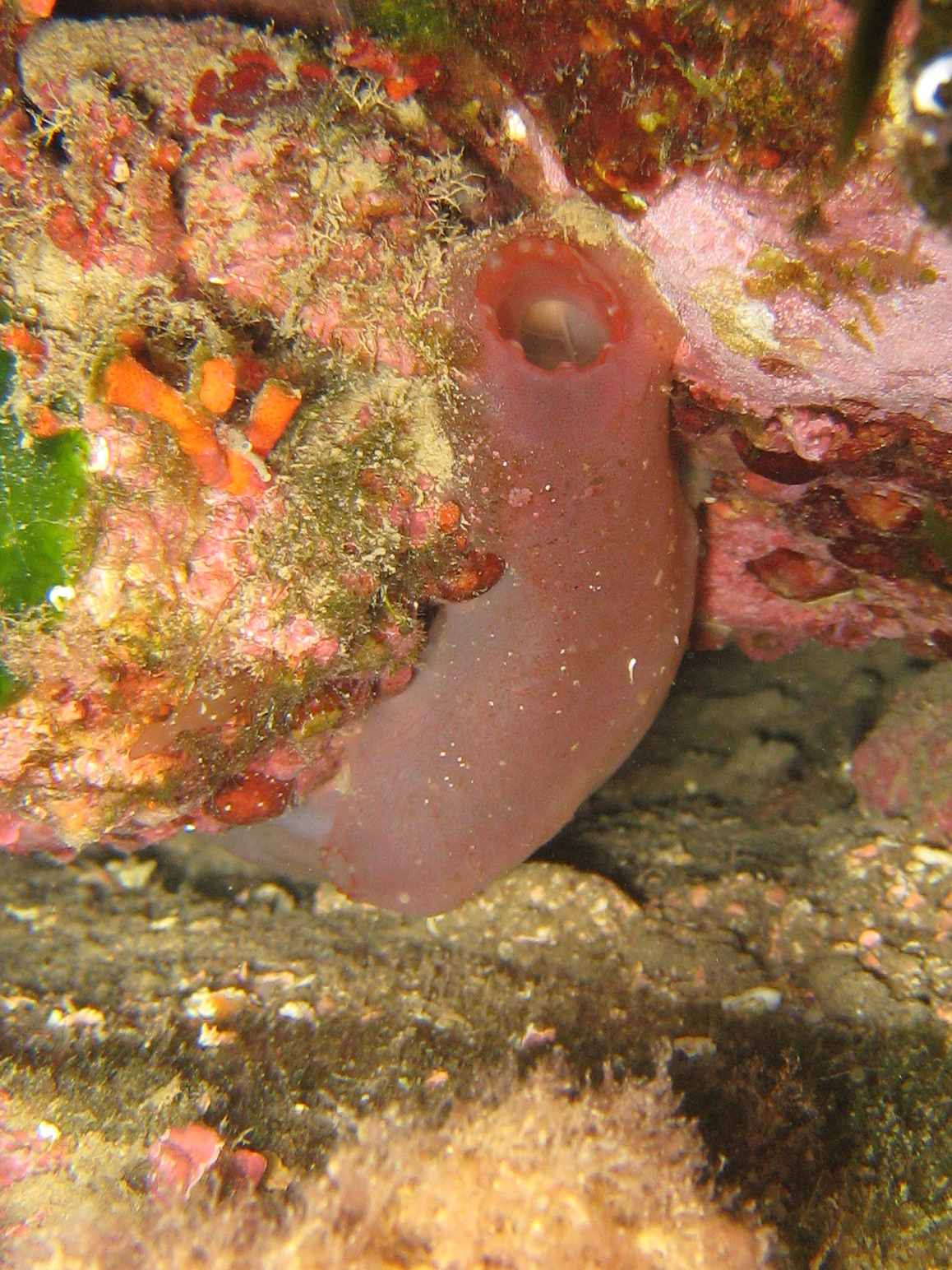

Scientific classification
- Domain: Eukaryota
- Kingdom: Animalia
- Phylum: Chordata
- Subphylum: Tunicata
- Class: Ascidiacea
- Order: Phlebobranchia
- Family: Ascidiidae
- Genus: Ascidia
- Species: A. mentula

Binomial name
- Ascidia mentula Müller, 1776

Synonyms
- Ascidia alderi Alder & Hancock, 1912; Ascidia crassa Alder & Hancock, 1912; Ascidia plana Alder & Hancock, 1912; Ascidia robusta Alder & Hancock, 1912; Ascidia rubicunda Alder & Hancock, 1912; Ascidia rubrotincta Alder & Hancock, 1912; Ascidia rudis Alder & Hancock, 1912

= Ascidia mentula =

Species of tunicate

Ascidia mentula is a species of solitary tunicate. It is found in the north east Atlantic Ocean, the Black Sea and Mediterranean Sea. It occurs around the coasts of Great Britain, but is rarely seen on the east coast of England or Scotland.

== Description ==
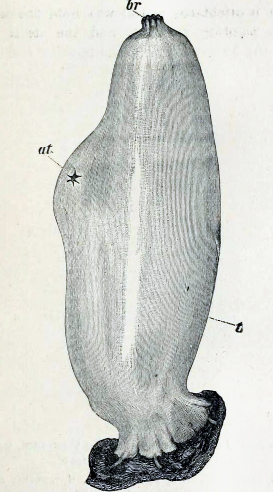
Ascidia mentula with at=atrial siphon; br=oral siphon; t=tunic

Ascidia mentula has a tough leathery envelope or tunic composed partly of cellulose. The translucent tunic encloses a fluid-filled body with irregular bulges and two inconspicuous siphons. It is 5 to 18 cm (2 to 7 in) tall, bottle or flask-shaped with the oral (inlet) siphon at the tip and the six-lobed atrial siphon half to two thirds of the way down. The oral siphon has six to eight, white-tipped, lobes and is surrounded by up to 100 branchial tentacles. It is usually red, pink or sometimes olive green in colour, and may be grey in deep water. It normally adheres to the substrate by the side opposite the atrial siphon.

== Distribution and habitat ==
Ascidia mentula is native to the north eastern Atlantic Ocean, its range extending from Norway southwards to the Mediterranean Sea and Black Sea. It occurs on rocky substrates at depths ranging from subtidal down to 200 metres (660 ft). It favours crevices and shady gullies and sometimes adheres to Laminaria holdfasts, stones and shells.

== Biology ==
Ascidia mentula feeds on plankton that it filters from seawater with a mucous net. A small bivalve mollusc (Modiolarca tumida) often lives within the tunic in the body cavity which may also be occupied by a small pea crab (Pinnotheres pinnotheres) and a copepod (Notopterophorus papilio).

Breeding takes place mainly in the summer. Fertilization is external and the tadpole larvae spend a short time in the plankton before settling on the seabed, undergoing metamorphosis and becoming juveniles.

== Name ==
Mentula is Latin word for penis, see Latin_obscenity#Mentula:_the_penis.
