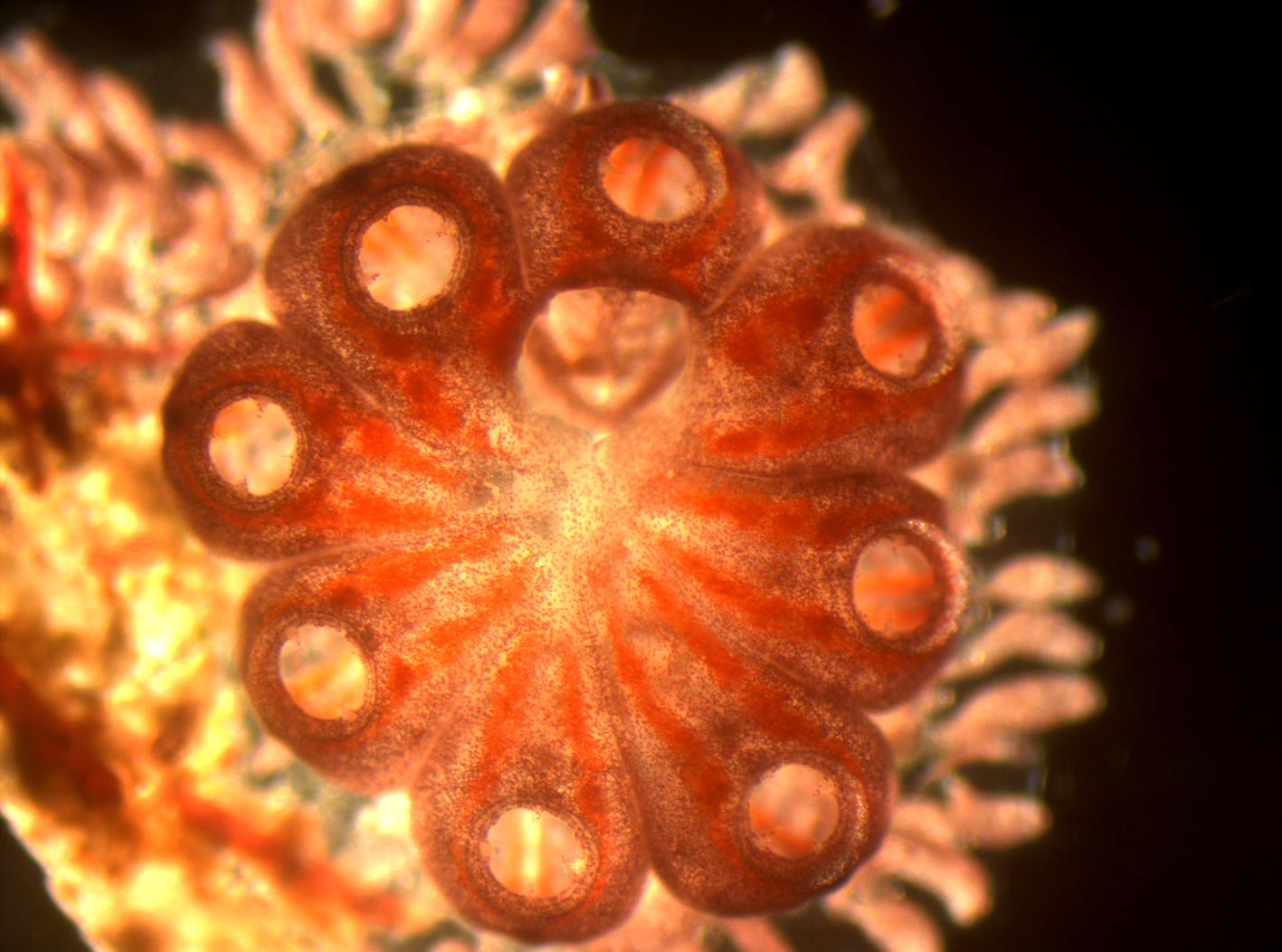

Scientific classification
- Kingdom: Animalia
- Phylum: Chordata
- Subphylum: Tunicata
- Class: Ascidiacea
- Order: Stolidobranchia
- Family: Styelidae
- Genus: Botrylloides
- Species: B. leachii

Binomial name
- Botrylloides leachii (Savigny, 1816)

Synonyms
- List: Botrylloides albicans Milne Edwards, 1841; Botrylloides boloniense Giard, 1875; Botrylloides clavelina Giard, 1872; Botrylloides cyanescens Giard, 1888; Botrylloides fulgurale Herdman, 1886; Botrylloides insigne Giard, 1872; Botrylloides leachi (Savigny, 1816); Botrylloides leptum Herdman, 1899; Botrylloides parvulum Huitfeld-Kaas, 1896; Botrylloides parvulus Huitfeld-Kaas, 1896; Botrylloides prostratum Giard, 1872; Botrylloides purpureum Drasche, 1883; Botrylloides pusilla Alder, 1863; Botrylloides radiata Alder & Hancock, 1848; Botrylloides ramulosa Alder & Hancock, 1848; Botrylloides rotifera Milne Edwards, 1841; Botrylloides rubrum Milne Edwards, 1841; Botrylloides sparsa Alder, 1863; Botrylloides translucidum Hartmeyer, 1912; Botrylloides vinosa Alder & Hancock, 1912; Botryllus leachi Savigny, 1816; Botryllus leachii (Savigny, 1816); Botryllus leptus (Herdman, 1899); Metrocarpa leachi (Savigny, 1816); Sarcobotrylloides espevaerense Huitfeld-Kaas, 1896; Sarcobotrylloides jacksonianum Herdman, 1899; Sarcobotrylloides pannosum Herdman, 1899

= Botrylloides leachii =

Species of sea squirt

Botrylloides leachii is a colonial tunicate of the family Styelidae. Its unique methods of propagation and regeneration make it an ideal model organism for use in biological study of development, immunology, stem cells, and regeneration.

== Description ==
Botrylloides leachii is a colonial tunicate and can form a flat gelatinous encrusting sheet or a more massive structure. The individual zooids are about 4 mm (0.2 in) in diameter while the whole colony may reach 15 cm (6 in) or more across. Groups of zooids tend to form pairs of parallel chains; each zooid has its own inhalant siphon but the groups share an exhalant siphon. The tunic is some shade of grey, pink, orange, yellow or white; the siphons have white rims, and the exhalant siphons have white radial streaks.

== Distribution and habitat ==
Botrylloides leachii has a wide distribution, with a number of species previously thought to be separate having been shown to be identical and synonymised with it. Its range includes the Indo-Pacific region, the Caribbean Sea and the Eastern Atlantic Ocean including the North Sea and the Mediterranean Sea. It grows on rock, various hard substrates and large seaweeds, as well as loose on sand and detritus, at depths down to about 30 m (100 ft).

== Biology ==
Like all tunicates, Botrylloides leachii is a filter feeder that feeds by drawing water into its interior through the inhalant siphon, filtering out the edible particles with a mucus net, and expelling the water and waste products through the exhalant siphon. The sexes are separate in this species, and the gametes are liberated into the water column. The larvae are planktonic at first but soon settle on the seabed where they undergo metamorphosis into zooids with adult organs. A founding zooid begins to form buds which grow into new zooids, which in turn bud again, and the colony expands. The zooids are connected by a network of blood vessels with minute finger-like processes called "ampullae". In time, the older zooids begin to degrade and become reabsorbed while the colony lives on.

Whole-body regeneration is extremely unusual among chordates, but a colony of Botrylloides leachii can regenerate itself from a small piece of tissue. In a colony where all the zooids have been removed and the only structure that remains is the linking vascular tissue, blood cells aggregate to initiate repairs, white blood cells infiltrate the wounds and macrophage-like cells ingest the debris. Within ten days, the macrophages have disappeared from the circulation and the zooids have regenerated. The ampullae are the seat of the regeneration process; researchers successfully grew 80 out of 95 sections of blood vessel with ampullae attached into new zooids, with a sexually mature zooid developing in about two weeks.
