= Nephromyces =

Scientific classification
- Domain: Eukaryota
- (unranked): SAR
- (unranked): Alveolata
- Phylum: Apicomplexa
- Class: Aconoidasida
- Order: Achromatorida
- Family: Haemohormidiidae
- Genus: Nephromyces Giard, 1888

Species
- Nephromyces molgularum Giard, 1888; Nephromyces rosocovitanus Giard, 1888; Nephromyces sorokini Giard, 1888

Genus of single-celled organisms

Nephromyces is a genus of apicomplexans that are symbionts of the ascidian genus Molgula (sea grapes).

== Systematics ==
Nephromyces was first described in 1888 by Alfred Mathieu Giard as a chytrid fungus, because of its filamentous cells. He formally named three species, each corresponding to a different species of the host animal. Molecular phylogenetics later showed that Nephromyces are not actually fungi, but instead constitute a group within the Apicomplexa that is related to the Piroplasmida.

=== Species of Nephromyces ===
- Nephromyces molgularum Giard, 1888
- Nephromyces rosocovitanus Giard, 1888
- Nephromyces sorokini Giard, 1888

== Description ==
Nephromyces is found in the lumen of the renal sac of its host animals. The renal sac is a closed, fluid-filled structure that is derived from the epicardium during development. There are different cell types (at least seven in Nephromyces from Molgula manhattensis) which appear to be different life cycle stages, as the different types appear in a consistent sequence after initial infection of the host animal. However, in a mature infection, different stages simultaneously co-occur in the same host individual. They include filaments (trophic stages), spores, motile but non-flagellated cells, and biflagellated swarmer cells. The non-flagellated motile cells resemble the sporozoites of other apicomplexans, while the spores contain structures that resemble the rhoptries of the apical complex, another typical apicomplexan feature.

== Symbiosis ==
Nephromyces is specific to the family Molgulidae, and has been found in species of Molgula and at least one other molgulid genus, Bostrichobranchus (B. pilularis). Every wild-collected adult Molgula animal examined has been found to contain Nephromyces, suggesting that it is a beneficial symbiont rather than a parasite; this makes Nephromyces an exception among apicomplexans, which are usually parasitic on their animal hosts. However, animals without Nephromyces can be obtained by spawning and raising them in filtered seawater. These symbiont-free animals have been used to study the Nephromyces life cycle. Nephromyces is released into surrounding seawater when its host dies, and cells of Nephromyces can remain alive and infective for at least 29 days outside of a host.

The renal sac organ where Nephromyces lives contains high concentrations of urate, a nitrogenous waste product. Activity of urate oxidase, an enzyme that breaks down urate, has been found in Nephromyces cells, hence they may be using the waste products from their host animal as a nitrogen source for themselves.

Intracellular bacteria have been found within cells of Nephromyces from Molgula manhattensis and M. occidentalis, making this a symbiosis within a symbiosis.
