= Aspiraculata =

Scientific classification
- Domain: Eukaryota
- Kingdom: Animalia
- Phylum: Chordata
- Subphylum: Tunicata
- Class: Sorberacea
- Order: Aspiraculata
- Family: Hexacrobylidae

Genera and species
- See text.

Former order of marine filter-feeders

Sorberacea were a monoorder and monofamilial class of benthic Tunicates. The single order of the class was Aspiraculata, and the single family of that order was Hexacrobylidae. In a taxonomic revision of the Tunicata in 2007, the name "Hexacrobylidae" was declared invalid and members of the family were included in the family Molgulidae in the class Ascidiacea.

They superficially resemble sea squirts but prey on invertebrates such as crustaceans. They also have some unique physical features that distinguish them from the ascidiaceans, including a severely reduced pharynx, the retention of the dorsal nerve cord as adults, the superficial position of their ganglion and the unique histology of the cells of their digestive tracts. The branchial syphon is large and surrounded by six large lobes; the cloacal syphon is small. They live exclusively in deep water and range in size from less than one inch (2 cm) to 2.4 inches (6 cm).

Contrary to almost all tunicates, the members of this group are not filter-feeders, and instead capture and eat nematodes and small crustaceans. They are solitary animals, found only in the deep sea.

== Taxonomy ==
Order Aspiraculata

- Family Hexacrobylidae
  - Genus Gasterascidia - accepted as Oligotrema Bourne, 1903
    - Gasterascidia lyra - accepted as Oligotrema lyra Monniot C. & Monniot F., 1973
    - Gasterascidia sandersi - accepted as Oligotrema sandersi (Monniot C. & Monniot F., 1968)
  - Genus Hexadactylus - accepted as Asajirus Kott, 1989
    - Hexadactylus arcticus - accepted as Asajirus indicus (Oka, 1913)
    - Hexadactylus eunuchus - accepted as Asajirus indicus (Oka, 1913)
    - Hexadactylus ledanoisi - accepted as Asajirus ledanoisi (Monniot C. & Monniot F., 1990)
  - Genus Oligotrema - now included in the family Molgulidae
    - Oligotrema lyra
    - Oligotrema psammites
  - Genus Sorbera - accepted as Oligotrema Bourne, 1903
    - Sorbera unigonas - accepted as Oligotrema unigonas (Monniot C. & Monniot F., 1974)
    - Sorbera digonas - accepted as Oligotrema psammites Bourne, 1903
