= Streptomyces hyaluromycini =

Scientific classification
- Domain: Bacteria
- Kingdom: Bacillati
- Phylum: Actinomycetota
- Class: Actinomycetes
- Order: Streptomycetales
- Family: Streptomycetaceae
- Genus: Streptomyces
- Species: S. hyaluromycini

Binomial name
- Streptomyces hyaluromycini Harunari et al. 2016

Type strain
- DSM 100105, NBRC 110483, MB-PO13

Species of bacterium

Streptomyces hyaluromycini is a Gram-positive bacterium species from the genus of Streptomyces which has been isolated from the tunicate Molgula manhattensis from the Tokyo Bay on Japan. This species produces hyaluromycin which is a Hyaluronidase inhibitor.

== See also ==
- List of Streptomyces species
