= Molgula occulta =

Scientific classification
- Kingdom: Animalia
- Phylum: Chordata
- Subphylum: Tunicata
- Class: Ascidiacea
- Order: Stolidobranchia
- Family: Molgulidae
- Genus: Molgula
- Species: M. occulta

Binomial name
- Molgula occulta Kupffer, 1875

Synonyms
- Anurella roscovita Lacaze-Duthiers, 1877; Caesira occulta (Kupffer, 1875); Molgula africana Sluiter, 1915; Molgula coreni Traustedt, 1880; Molgula hannensis Peres, 1949; Molgula psammodes Traustedt, 1880

Species of sea squirt

Molgula occulta is a species of solitary tunicate in the family Molgulidae. It is native to the north eastern Atlantic Ocean, the North Sea and the Mediterranean Sea. The specific name occulta means "tailless" and refers to the tunicate's larva, which lacks the tail found in some other species in the genus Molgula.

== Description ==
Molgula occulta is a solitary, oval-globular tunicate with a broad, shallow six-lobed oral siphon and a similar-sized four-lobed atrial siphon, both near the apex. It is 1.5 to 3 cm (0.6 to 1.2 in) tall, light brown in colour and resembles a kiwifruit in size and appearance. The rather stiff tunic wall is completely coated with shell fragments, mud particles and grains of sand. This distinguishes it from the otherwise very similar species Molgula oculata which has a bare patch around and between its siphons to which sediment does not adhere.

== Distribution and habitat ==
Molgula occulta is found in the north eastern Atlantic and its range extends from Norway and Sweden to the Iberian Peninsula and the Mediterranean Sea. In the British Isles, it is fairly common on west, south and east facing coasts, on the lower shore or in the shallow subtidal zone where it buries itself in sand or mud with just its siphons protruding.

== Biology ==
Molgula occulta is a filter feeder. It draws in water through its oral siphon, passes it through its gut, removing the edible bacteria and other planktonic particles on the way, and expelling it through the atrial siphon.

The larvae of tunicates are known as tadpole larvae because of their resemblance to amphibian tadpoles. The larva of the closely related species Molgula oculata has a tail (oculata means "tailed") but that of Molgula occulta does not. Nor does it have an otolith, a sensory organ connected with balance, which the former possesses. Molgula occulta hatches into a tailless larva from the chorion in twelve hours and develops four ampullae or dilatations immediately before metamorphosing into a juvenile. It appears that the tailed larva is the ancestral state in the Molgulidae and that loss of the tail has occurred on at least four separate occasions independently. Without tail or otolith, the larva is unable to swim or orient itself and so is unable to disperse to new locations. It is hypothesized that living as it does on sand flats, the larva is passively dispersed by waves and currents.
