= Fungulus =

Scientific classification
- Domain: Eukaryota
- Kingdom: Animalia
- Phylum: Chordata
- Subphylum: Tunicata
- Class: Ascidiacea
- Order: Stolidobranchia
- Family: Molgulidae
- Genus: Fungulus; Herdman, 1882

Genus of sea squirts

Fungulus is a genus of marine tunicates.

== Species ==
- Fungulus antarcticus Herdman, 1912
- Fungulus cinereus Herdman, 1882
- Fungulus curlus Monniot & Monniot, 1976
- Fungulus minutulus Monniot & Monniot, 1991
- Fungulus perlucidus (Herdman, 1881)
