= Molgula citrina =

Scientific classification
- Kingdom: Animalia
- Phylum: Chordata
- Subphylum: Tunicata
- Class: Ascidiacea
- Order: Stolidobranchia
- Family: Molgulidae
- Genus: Molgula
- Species: M. citrina

Binomial name
- Molgula citrina Alder & Hancock, 1848

Synonyms
- Caesira arctica (Kiaer, 1896); Caesira birulai (Redikorzev, 1907); Caesira citrina (Alder & Hancock, 1848); Caesira littoralis (Verrill, 1871); Caesira nana (Kupffer, 1873); Gymnocystis comosa Giard, 1872; Molgula arctica Kiaer, 1896; Molgula birulai Redikorzev, 1907; Molgula echinosiphonica Lacaze-Duthiers, 1877; Molgula litoralis Verrill, 1871; Molgula littoralis Verrill, 1871; Molgula nana Kupffer, 1873; Molgula nuda Wagner, 1885

Species of sea squirt

Molgula citrina is a species of solitary tunicate in the family Molgulidae. It is found on both sides of the northern Atlantic Ocean and in the Arctic Ocean. In 2008 it was found in Kachemak Bay in Alaska, the first time it had been detected in the Pacific Ocean.

== Description ==
Molgula citrina takes the form of a globular or ovoid sac and can grow to a diameter of 18 mm (0.7 in). The tunic (outer surface of the sac) is greyish-green and firm, with few particles of sediment adhering to it, and this distinguishes it from many species in this genus. The siphons are widely separated. The buccal siphon, through which water is drawn into the body cavity, has six lobes while the atrial siphon, through which water leaves, is short and has four lobes. About fourteen branched tentacles surround the base of the buccal siphon, and prevent particles that are too large from entering the body cavity.

== Distribution ==
Molgula citrina is found in the Arctic Ocean and the northeastern Atlantic Ocean as far south as the British Isles and the northern coast of France. In the northwestern Atlantic it occurs as far south as the Gulf of Saint Lawrence and the Bay of Fundy. It is usually found in shallow water but its maximum depth range is about 200 m (656 ft). It is also a fouling organism, adhering to floating docks and associated structures.

The appearance of M. citrina in Alaska in 2008 raised the question of whether this species is a naturally occurring, circumpolar species previously undetected in the northern Pacific Ocean, or whether it had arrived anthropogenically. The former is possible because the Pacific Northwest and Alaskan waters are not well surveyed. Alternatively, it could have colonised the Pacific naturally via the Northwest Passage which is becoming more accessible because of the decrease in sea ice caused by global warming. However this would be against the trend, as some species have spread from the Pacific to the Atlantic by this route but seldom vice versa.

If M. citrina arrived in the Pacific with the help of man there are several possibilities. It is unlikely to survive in ballast water but may have been transported in the sea chest of a vessel, a recess on the hull covered with a grill and used for the intake of sea water for ballast, firefighting, engine cooling and other purposes. Sea chests house a community of organisms that would be unlikely to survive as fouling animals on the vessel's hull. M. citrina may have arrived in the Pacific in one of these, perhaps via the Northwest Passage. Being a cold water species, it is unlikely this species would have arrived via the Caribbean Sea and Panama Canal where the water temperature would be outside the tunicate's survival range.

== Biology ==
As with other ascidians, Molgula citrina is a suspension feeder, capturing planktonic particles by filtering sea water through its body. Water is drawn in through the buccal siphon, the food particles are extracted, and the water and waste material exits via the atrial siphon.

M. citrina is a hermaphrodite and is viviparous. Sperm is shed into the water column and enters another individual through its buccal siphon. A batch of eggs is liberated from the oviduct and these are fertilised within the body cavity. The eggs are opaque and have red or yellow yolks. They are about 0.20 mm (0.008 in) in diameter. The developing embryos are brooded in the body cavity. Hatching is initiated by the release of enzymes which cause the egg membranes to rupture. The larvae have notochords (stiffening rods) and resemble salamander tadpoles. They have fluid-filled sensory organs known as otocysts. The larvae continue to be brooded for a while but are later liberated into the sea. In European waters about 80% undergo metamorphosis while still in the body cavity but in North America only about 2% are retained internally to metamorphosis. When released, the larvae have a very short free-swimming period, ranging from a few minutes to an hour or two, before undergoing metamorphosis. The juveniles soon become sticky and attach to any hard surfaces with which they come in contact. This often includes the tunic of the parent individual and this may form a small cluster of individuals.
