= Hyaluromycin =

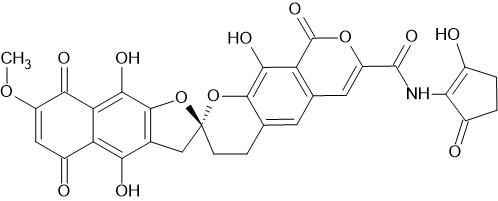

Names
- Systematic IUPAC name (2S)-4,9,10'-Trihydroxy-N-(2-hydroxy-5-oxo-1-cyclopenten-1-yl)-7-methoxy-5,8,9'-trioxo-4',5,8,9'-tetrahydro-3H,3'H-spiro[naphtho[2,3-b]furan-2,2'-pyrano[4,3-g]chromene]-7'-carboxamide

Identifiers
CAS Number	1643776-08-2
3D model (JSmol)	Interactive image; Interactive image
ChEBI	CHEBI:199010
ChemSpider	32674747
PubChem CID	139583572
CompTox Dashboard (EPA)	DTXSID201043899
- InChI: InChI=1S/C30H21NO13/c1-41-16-8-15(34)19-20(23(16)36)25(38)27-12(22(19)35)9-30(44-27)5-4-10-6-11-7-17(28(39)31-21-13(32)2-3-14(21)33)42-29(40)18(11)24(37)26(10)43-30/h6-8,32,35,37-38H,2-5,9H2,1H3,(H,31,39)/t30-/m0/s1 Key: SVUGCIHLYMYXQP-PMERELPUSA-N; InChI=1S/C30H21NO13/c1-41-16-8-15(34)19-20(23(16)36)25(38)27-12(22(19)35)9-30(44-27)5-4-10-6-11-7-17(28(39)31-21-13(32)2-3-14(21)33)42-29(40)18(11)24(37)26(10)43-30/h6-8,32,34,36-37H,2-5,9H2,1H3,(H,31,39)/t30-/m0/s1 Key: LBCHZWBDBFDLQH-PMERELPUSA-N
- SMILES: O=C1OC(=Cc2cc3CC[C@]4(Cc5c(O4)c(O)c4C(=O)C(=CC(=O)c4c5O)OC)Oc3c(O)c12)C(=O)NC=1C(=O)CCC=1O; COC1=C(C2=C(C(=C1)O)C(=O)C3=C(C2=O)O[C@]4(C3)CCC5=C(O4)C(=C6C(=C5)C=C(OC6=O)C(=O)NC7=C(CCC7=O)O)O)O

Properties
Chemical formula	C_{30}H_{21}NO_{13}
Molar mass	603.492 g·mol^{−1}
- Except where otherwise noted, data are given for materials in their standard state (at 25 °C [77 °F], 100 kPa). verify (what is ?) Infobox references

Hyaluromycin is a member of the rubromycin family of antibiotics that inhibits the hydrolysis of hyaluronic acid by hyaluronidase. It has been isolated from cultures of Streptomyces hyaluromycini.
