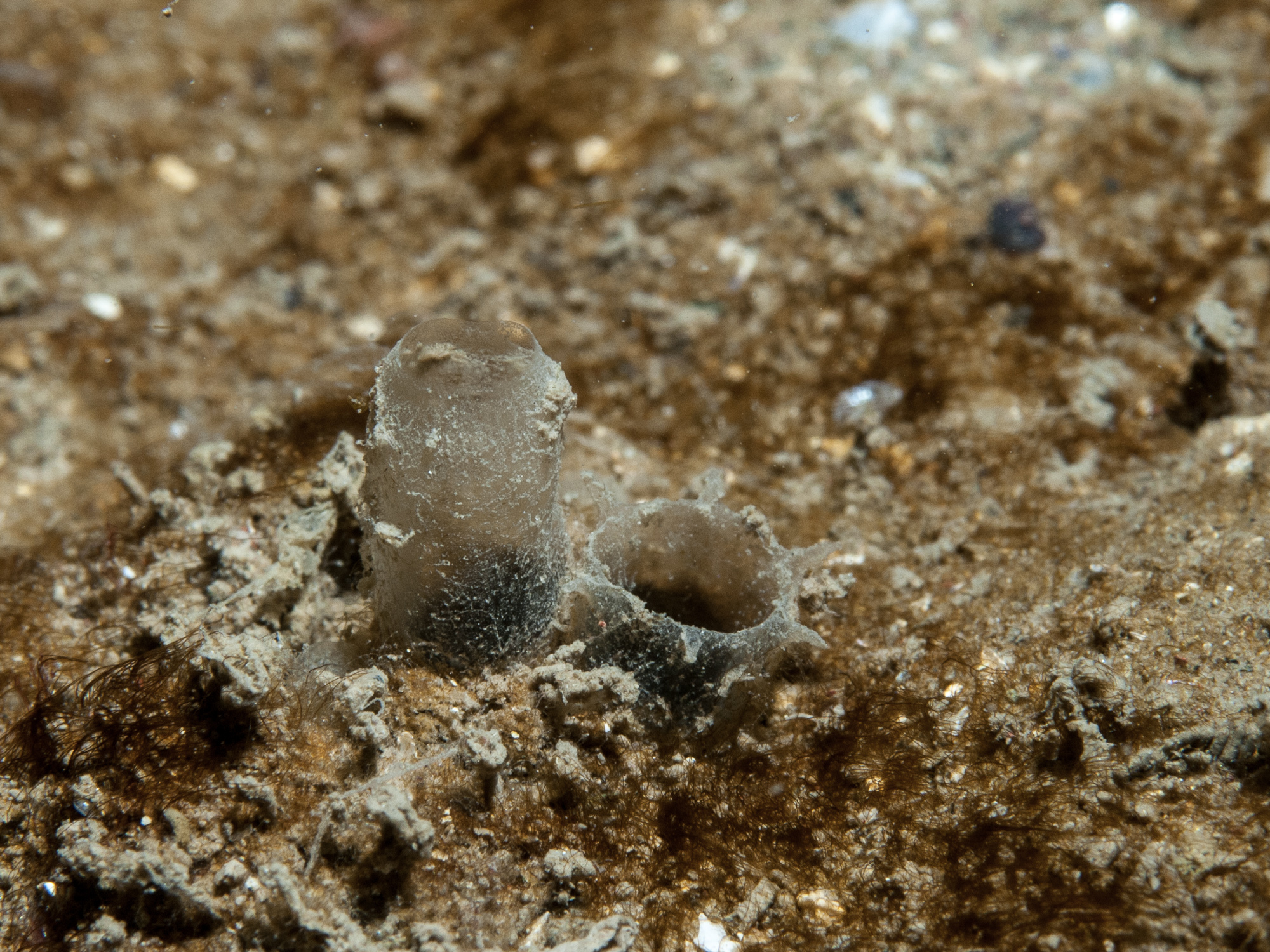
- Eugyra arenosa

Scientific classification
- Kingdom: Animalia
- Phylum: Chordata
- Subphylum: Tunicata
- Class: Ascidiacea
- Order: Stolidobranchia
- Family: Molgulidae
- Genus: Eugyra; Alder & Hancock, 1870

Synonyms
- Eugyrioides Seeliger, 1907

= Eugyra =

Genus of sea squirts

Eugyra is a species of marine tunicates.

== Species ==
- Eugyra adriatica Drasche, 1884
- Eugyra arenosa (Alder & Hancock, 1848)
- Eugyra bilabiata Sluiter, 1887
- Eugyra borealis (Monniot & Monniot, 1977)
- Eugyra brewinae Millar, 1960
- Eugyra communis Nishikawa, 1984
- Eugyra connectens Ärnbäck, 1928
- Eugyra dakarensis (Pizon, 1896)
- Eugyra extrosa Nishikawa, 1984
- Eugyra glutinans (Moeller, 1842)
- Eugyra greenwichensis (Monniot & Monniot, 1974)
- Eugyra hexarhiza Tokioka, 1949
- Eugyra islandica Millar, 1974
- Eugyra japonicus (Oka, 1934)
- Eugyra kerguelenensis Herdman, 1881
- Eugyra malayensis Millar, 1975
- Eugyra mammillata Kott, 1985
- Eugyra millimetra Kott, 1985
- Eugyra molguloides Sluiter, 1904
- Eugyra munida Millar, 1982
- Eugyra myodes Millar, 1962
- Eugyra novaezealandiae Brewin, 1950
- Eugyra pedunculata Traustedt, 1886
- Eugyra pellucida (Macdonald, 1859)
- Eugyra peresi Millar, 1957
- Eugyra polyducta (Monniot & Monniot, 1983)
- Eugyra symmetrica Drasche, 1884
- Eugyra vallatum (Monniot, 1978)

Species names currently considered to be synonyms:

- Eugyra aernbaeckae Millar, 1960: synonym of Pareugyrioides arnbackae (Millar, 1960)
- Eugyra arctoa Ärnbäck, 1928: synonym of Eugyra glutinans (Moeller, 1842)
- Eugyra arenata (Stimpson, 1852): synonym of Molgula arenata Stimpson, 1852
- Eugyra arnbackae Millar, 1960: synonym of Pareugyrioides arnbackae (Millar, 1960)
- Eugyra asamusi Oka, 1930: synonym of Eugyra glutinans (Moeller, 1842)
- Eugyra flabelligona Millar, 1975: synonym of Pareugyrioides exigua (Kott, 1972)
- Eugyra globosa Alder & Hancock, 1870: synonym of Eugyra arenosa (Alder & Hancock, 1848)
- Eugyra guillei (Monniot, 1994): synonym of Gamaster guillei Monniot, 1994
- Eugyra guttula (Michaelsen, 1900): synonym of Eugyra kerguelenensis Herdman, 1881
- Eugyra kerguelensis Herdman, 1882: synonym of Eugyra kerguelenensis Herdman, 1881
- Eugyra macrentera Millar, 1962: synonym of Pareugyrioides macrentera (Millar, 1962)
- Eugyra malayanus Millar, 1975: synonym of Eugyra malayensis Millar, 1975
- Eugyra moretonensis Kott, 1972: synonym of Eugyra molguloides Sluiter, 1904
- Eugyra peduculata Traustedt, 1886: synonym of Molgula pedunculata Herdman, 1881
- Eugyra pilularis (Verrill, 1871): synonym of Bostrichobranchus pilularis (Verrill, 1871)
- Eugyra symetrica Drasche, 1884: synonym of Eugyra symmetrica Drasche, 1884
- Eugyra translucida Kiaer, 1896: synonym of Eugyra arenosa (Alder & Hancock, 1848)
- Eugyra woermani Michaelsen, 1914: synonym of Eugyra dakarensis (Pizon, 1896)
- Eugyra woermanni Michaelsen, 1914: synonym of Eugyra dakarensis (Pizon, 1896)
