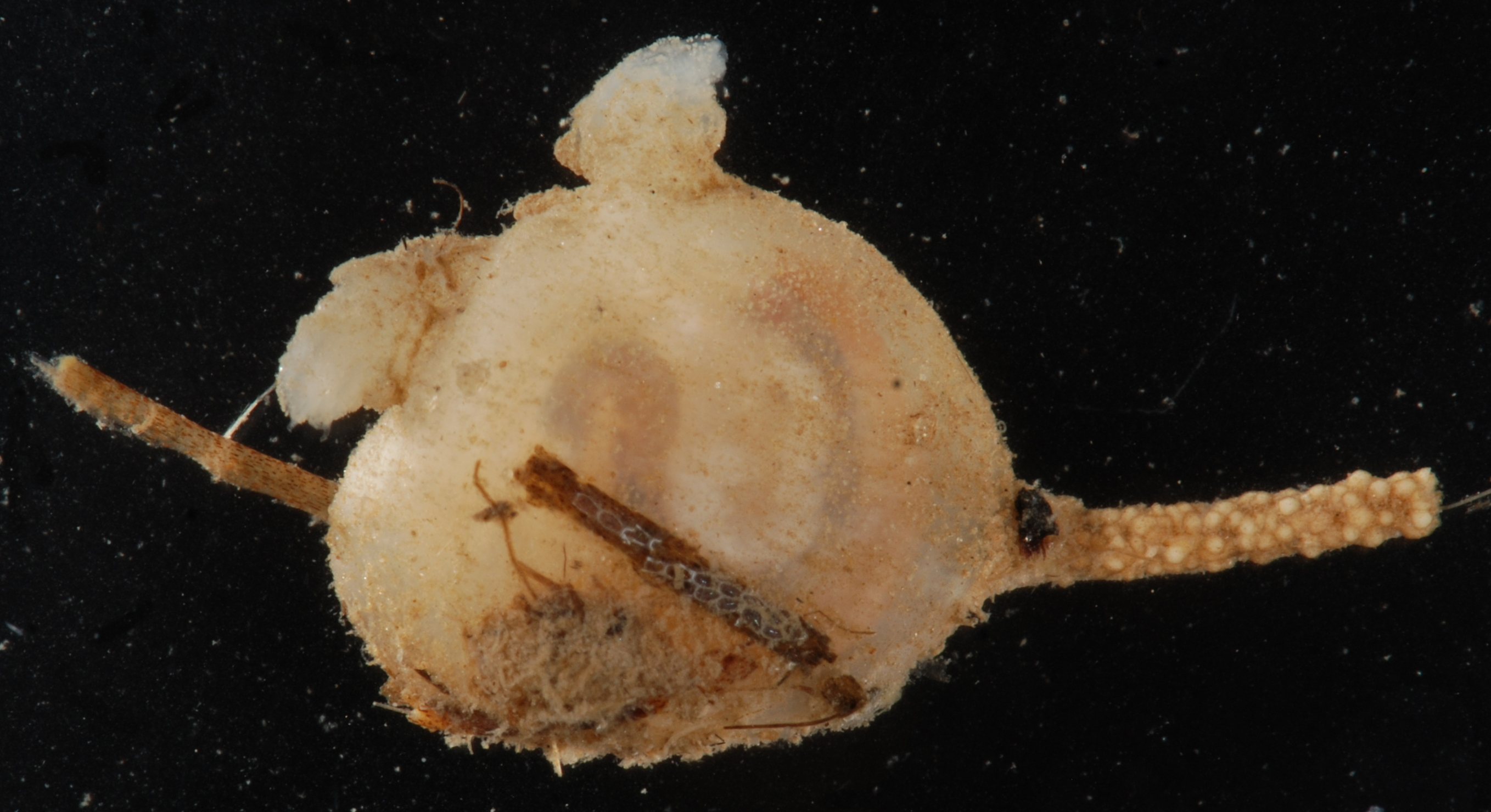

Scientific classification
- Kingdom: Animalia
- Phylum: Chordata
- Subphylum: Tunicata
- Class: Ascidiacea
- Order: Stolidobranchia
- Family: Molgulidae
- Genus: Molgula
- Species: M. manhattensis

Binomial name
- Molgula manhattensis (De Kay, 1843)

= Molgula manhattensis =

Species of sea squirt

Molgula manhattensis, commonly known as "sea grapes", is a species of ascidian commonly found along the East Coast and Gulf Coast region of the United States. Although it is native to this region, it has been introduced to other areas of Europe, Australia, and the West Coast.

== Description ==
Molgula manhattensis is small, spherical, brownish-grey in color, somewhat translucent, and feels soft and rubbery to the touch. Like other ascidians, they have two siphons (incurrent and excurrent), through which they draw water for ventilation and filter-feeding, and also for releasing their gametes. They are hermaphroditic, and release sperm and eggs into the water for external fertilization, unlike some other species of Molgula which may be viviparous (e.g. M. citrina). The tunic is covered with many little fibrils.

== Habitat and diet ==
Molgula manhattensis can live from the intertidal zone to a depth of 300 feet. They can attach to solid organisms or even rocks, pilings, buoys, or sand. The sea squirts can also live in a temperature range of about 50 °F to about 80 °F. They can live in water with a salinity of 33.270 to 36.231 PSS, with oxygen concentrations between 3.960 and 6.328 mL/L.

Mogula manhattensis is native to the East Coast of the United States and to waters around Europe. It is also found on the West Coast of the United States, and to parts of Asia and Oceania.

Adults can live off of almost anything, making them very good survivors in bodies of water, though they prefer protected waters. The larvae can only live for a few days unless they attach to a hard surface (similar to oysters and mussels). The ascidian rapidly spreads, often outcompeting native benthic species in its introduced range, leading to ecological and economic harm.
