= Minipera =

Scientific classification
- Kingdom: Animalia
- Phylum: Chordata
- Subphylum: Tunicata
- Class: Ascidiacea
- Order: Stolidobranchia
- Family: Molgulidae
- Genus: Minipera; Monniot & Monniot, 1974

Species
- See text

Genus of sea squirts

Minipera is a genus of ascidian tunicates in the family Molgulidae.

Species within the genus Minipera include:

- Minipera macquariensis Sanamyan & Sanamyan, 1999
- Minipera papillosa Monniot C. & Monniot F., 1974
- Minipera pedunculata Monniot C. & Monniot F., 1974
- Minipera tacita Monniot & Monniot, 1985
