= Gamaster =

Scientific classification
- Kingdom: Animalia
- Phylum: Chordata
- Subphylum: Tunicata
- Class: Ascidiacea
- Order: Stolidobranchia
- Family: Molgulidae
- Genus: Gamaster; Pizon, 1896

Species
- See text

Genus of sea squirts

Gamaster is a genus of ascidian tunicates in the family Molgulidae.

Species within the genus Gamaster include:

- Gamaster dakarensis Pizon, 1896
- Gamaster guillei Monniot, 1994
- Gamaster vallatum Monniot, 1978

Species names currently considered to be synonyms:

- Gamaster japonicus Oka, 1934: synonym of Eugyra japonicus (Oka, 1934)
