= Rhizomolgula =

Scientific classification
- Kingdom: Animalia
- Phylum: Chordata
- Subphylum: Tunicata
- Class: Ascidiacea
- Order: Stolidobranchia
- Family: Molgulidae
- Genus: Rhizomolgula; Ritter, 1901

Genus of sea squirts

Rhizomolgula is a genus of Ascidian Tunicates in the family Molgulidae.

Species within the genus Rhizomolgula include:

- Rhizomolgula globularis (Pallas, 1776)
- Rhizomolgula japonica Oka, 1926

Species names currently considered to be synonyms:

- Rhizomolgula arenaria Ritter, 1901: synonym of Rhizomolgula globularis (Pallas, 1776)
- Rhizomolgula gigantea Redikorzev, 1907: synonym of Rhizomolgula globularis (Pallas, 1776)
- Rhizomolgula intermedia Michaelsen, 1908: synonym of Rhizomolgula globularis (Pallas, 1776)
- Rhizomolgula ritteri Hartmeyer, 1903: synonym of Rhizomolgula globularis (Pallas, 1776)
- Rhizomolgula warpachovskii Redikorzev, 1908: synonym of Rhizomolgula globularis (Pallas, 1776)
