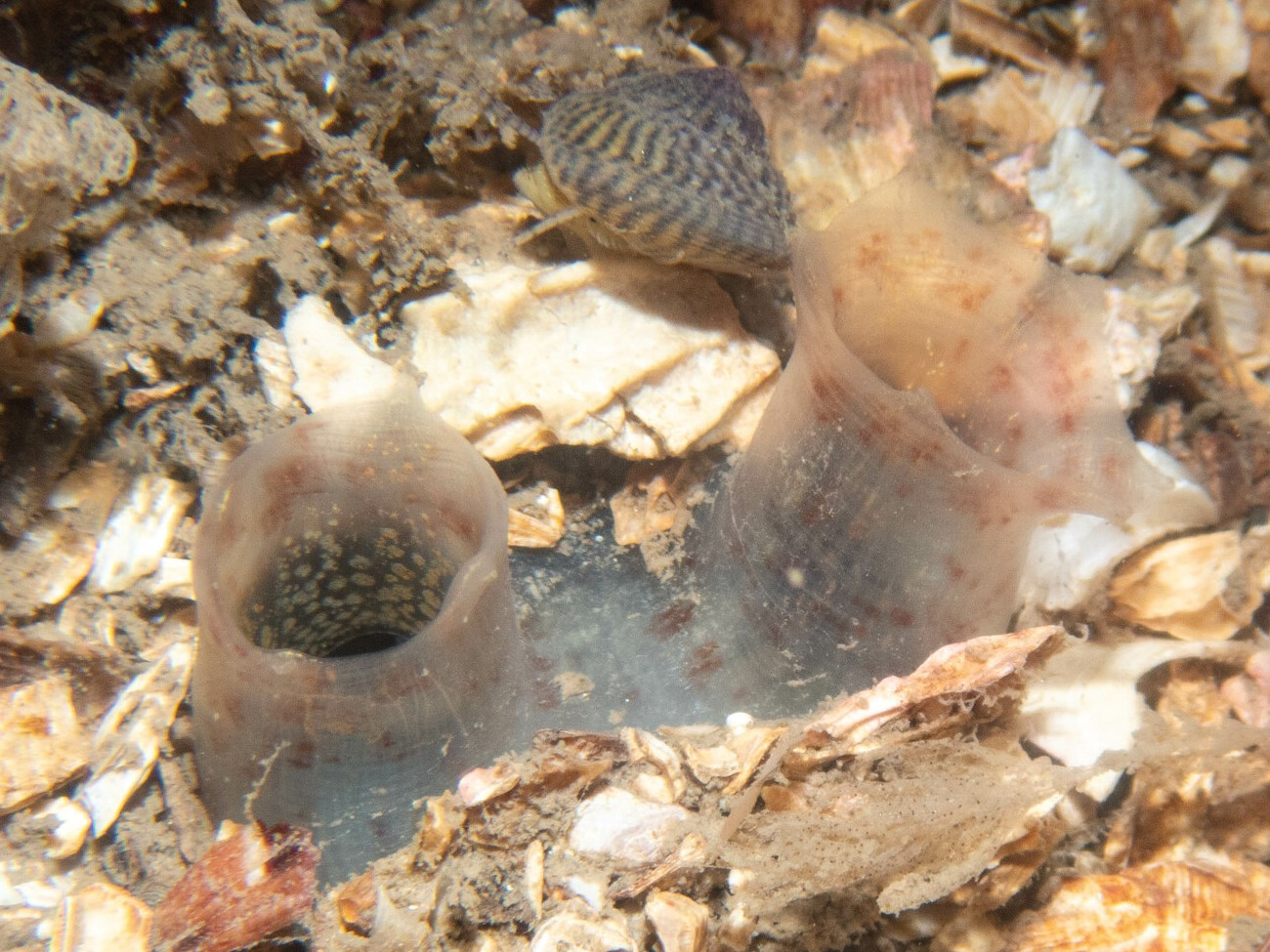

Scientific classification
- Kingdom: Animalia
- Phylum: Chordata
- Subphylum: Tunicata
- Class: Ascidiacea
- Order: Stolidobranchia
- Family: Molgulidae
- Genus: Molgula
- Species: M. oculata

Binomial name
- Molgula oculata Forbes, 1848

Synonyms
- Anurella oculata (Forbes, 1848)

= Molgula oculata =

Species of sea squirt

Molgula oculata, commonly known as the sea grape, is a species of solitary tunicate in the family Molgulidae. It is native to the north eastern Atlantic Ocean and the North Sea. The specific name oculata means "having eyes"; the species has orifices which "seem like dark eyes within a spectacle-formed frame".

== Description ==
Molgula oculata is nearly spherical in shape and is about 2 to 3 in (5 to 8 cm) in diameter. It has a sac-like body with a leathery covering known as its tunic, with two siphons on the upper surface. Water is drawn into the body cavity through a six-lobed oral siphon and expelled through a four-lobed atrial siphon. The oral siphon is surrounded by a ring of branched tentacles, the function of which is to prevent large particles being drawn into the pharynx with the water current. This tunicate is very well camouflaged. It is a sandy brown colour and is partially buried in the sediment on the seabed with the two siphons projecting. Sand grains and shell fragments adhere to its tunic, completely covering the surface apart from a small area in the immediate vicinity of the siphons. This bare patch helps to distinguish it from the closely related Molgula occulta which is completely coated in particles.

== Distribution and habitat ==
Molgula oculata is found in the north eastern Atlantic Ocean and North Sea. Its range extends from Norway and the Shetland Islands southwards to the Bay of Biscay. It is found unattached but nearly submerged in the sandy or gravelly seabed with only its siphons protruding. It occurs from low tide level down to depths of 80 metres (260 ft).

== Biology ==
Molgula oculata is a suspension feeder, filtering planktonic particles and bacteria from the water which is pumped continually through its body. Like other tunicates, it is a hermaphrodite and at breeding time, sperm and eggs are liberated into the sea where fertilisation takes place. The larva of a tunicate is known as a tadpole larva because of its resemblance to an amphibian tadpole. It has such chordate characteristics as a notochord and a primitive nerve system, and also has a tail with which it can swim. At metamorphosis, it attaches itself to a hard surface with a sucker, the tissues are extensively reorganised and it loses all these features. The closely related species Molgula occulta does not have a tail (occulta means "tailless"). Nor does it have an otolith, a sensory organ connected with balance, which the former possesses. In the laboratory, the two have been hybridised and it was found that the larval offspring of the occulta x oculata hybrid possessed a half length tail and an otolith. The researchers hypothesized that both species were descended from a common ancestral line but that at some stage, M. occulta had lost part of its genome.
