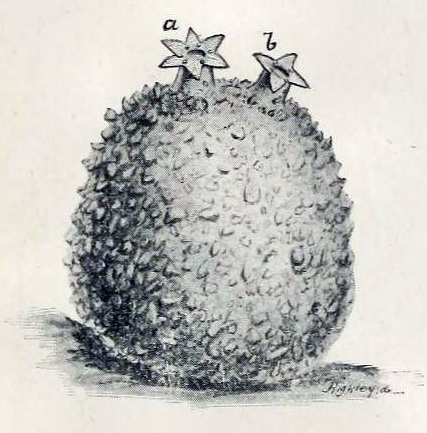
- Molgula oculata; a) branchial orifice; b) atrial orifice

Scientific classification
- Kingdom: Animalia
- Phylum: Chordata
- Subphylum: Tunicata
- Class: Ascidiacea
- Order: Stolidobranchia
- Family: Molgulidae
- Genus: Molgula

Synonyms
- Anurella Lacaze-Duthiers, 1877; Ascopera Herdman, 1881; Astropera Pizon, 1898; Caesira Flemming, 1822; Ctenicella Lacaze-Duthiers, 1877; Cystingia Macleay, 1825; Eugyriopsis Roule, 1885; Euritteria Huntsman, 1922; Gymnocystis Giard, 1872; Lithonephria Giard, 1872 (misspelling); Lithonephrya Giard, 1872; Meristocarpus Pizon, 1899; Mogula Kirkpatrick, 1905 (misspelling); Molgulidium Seeliger, 1907; Molgulina Hartmeyer, 1914; Pera Stimpson, 1852; Syphonotethis Gervais, 1840; Xenomolgula Arnback, 1931

= Molgula =

Genus of tunicates

Molgula, or sea grapes, are very common, globular, individual marine tunicates roughly the size of grapes. Molgula are a genus of the class ascidians, having many species sized from 20–50 mm and that has a life cycle with a tailed tadpole stage or without a tailed tadpole stage. Molgula are sessile invertebrates that grows on substrates and are always found existing alone. There are over one hundred species of molgulids with a vast majority of them in the Northern and Southern parts of the world with a few along the equator. All species of Molgula are suspension feeders and will have the highest population in areas with high amounts of small particles to feed on.

== Morphology and development ==
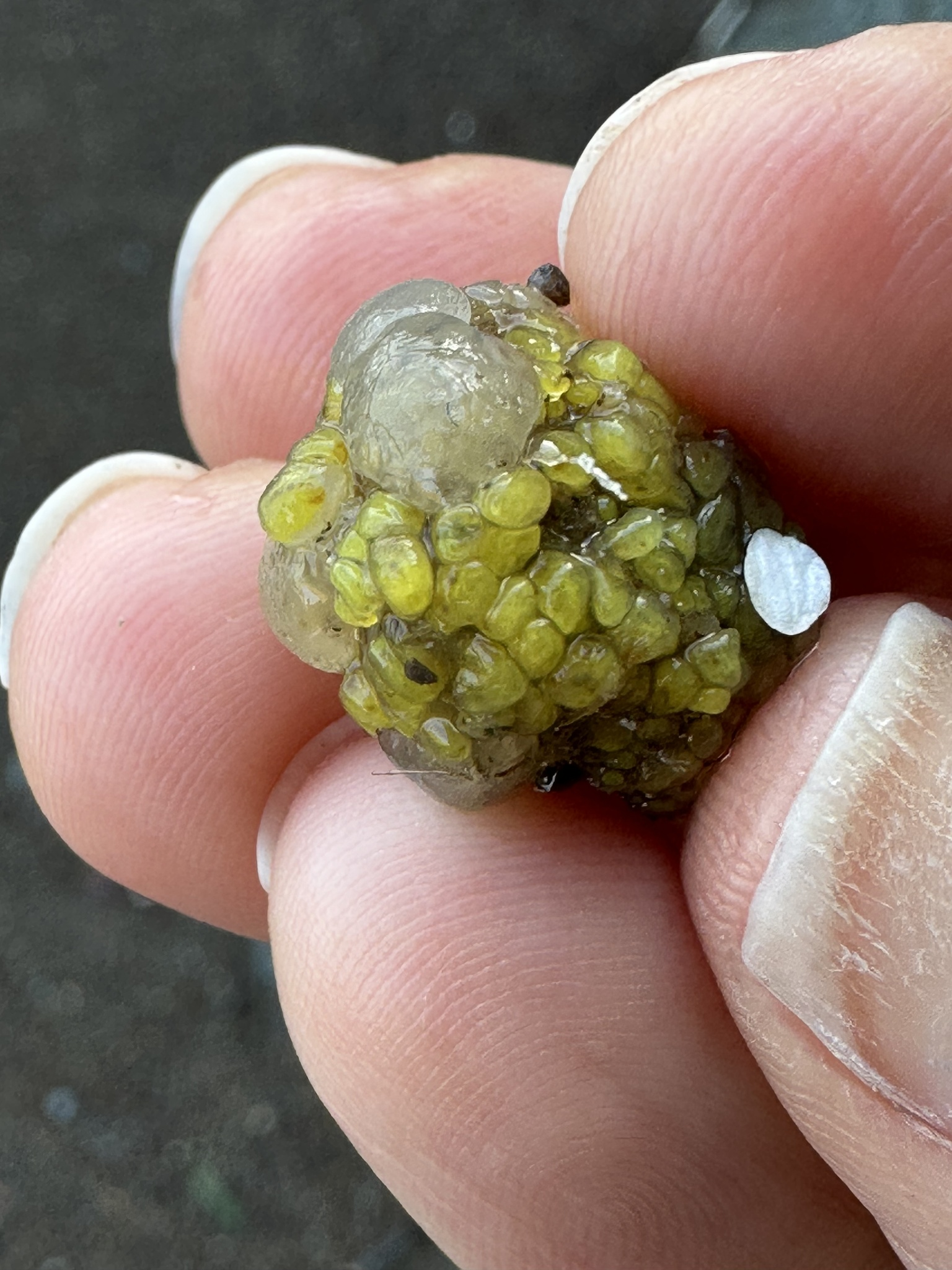
A green colored Molgula manhattensis

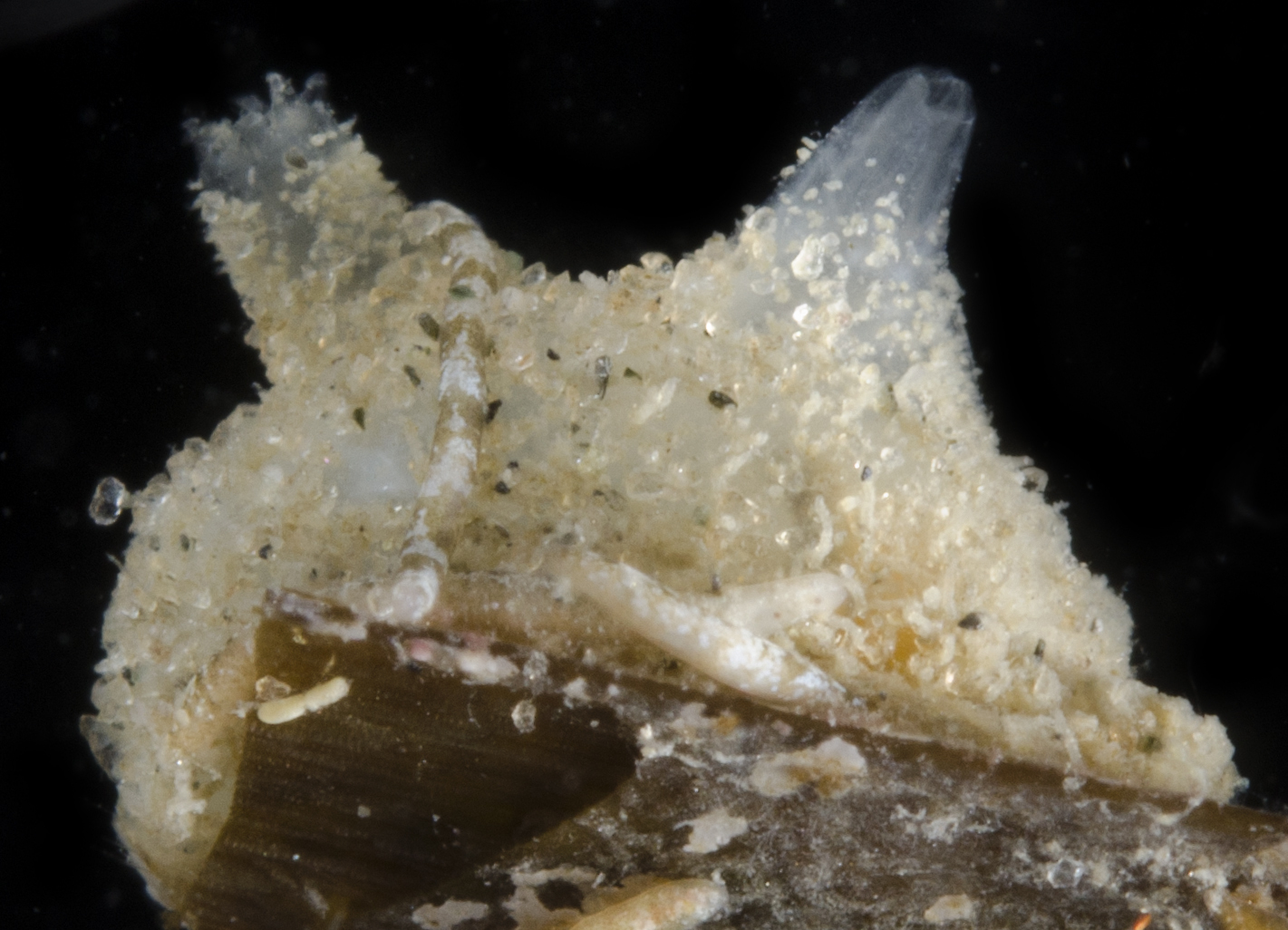
A light yellow colored Molgula manhattensis

They are translucent with two protruding siphons, oral and atrial consisting of six and four lobes respectively. They are found subtidally, attached to slow-moving submerged objects or organisms. All species of Molgula have a fluid-filled structure called the renal sac. The renal sac contains nitrogenous wastes, solid concretions composed of weddellite and calcite, and an apicomplexan symbiont called Nephromyces. To further expand on the animals structures, they contain a layer of tunic and given the slight variations existing within the species in terms of forms, they have evolved different bodily and structure colorations as well. For instance in the organisms classified as Molgula manhattensis, the majority have adopted shades in between light yellow and green as depicted by the colored images on the right, with a few being a dusty brown color as well. However, when comparing different species, contrast in colors can be observed.

Furthermore, to delve into the development of the genus Molgula has a wide range of variations among in different species. Many of them are hermaphroditic and can self-fertilize such as Molgula pacifica which are brooded. They can be viviparous like Molgula citrina, from which a larva will pop out, or can have an oviparous egg like Molgula oculata. The way they hatch from the egg can vary such as digestion of the egg membrane or breaking out of it. Molgula are unique ascidians as they can have a tailed tadpoles larvae like most ascidians or an anural larvae. The tailless larvae have reduced characteristics like notochord and tail muscle cells. Molgula have holoblastic cleavage which is present In the species M. pacifica.

Molgula pacifica lacks the tadpole stage in its life cycle meaning it has anural development. Most ascidians undergo urodele development meaning that they have a tailed larval stage. The oocytes and fertilized eggs lack a perivitelline space and test cells that differentiate them with those of the urodele species. Embryos are also similar to urodele ascidians in that they have a similar cleavage pattern and also begin gastrulation at the vegetal pole. There is more modification in cell shape and movement during gastrulation. The muscle cells were absent in the posterior region which is the reason for the lack of the larval tail. The M. pacifica don't have acetylcholinesterase activity on the other hand the urodele species show a high level of acetylcholinesterase activity in the tail muscles. The developmental changes such as modifying the gastrulation and muscle development lead to the elimination of tadpole stage.

== Distribution and habitats ==
In the western Atlantic Ocean, Molgula range from the Arctic to North Carolina, to the center of the United States Eastern Seaboard. The genus Molgula has a wide distribution with Molgula kolaensis being found in the Arctic and the majority being found in pacific or Atlantic waters. Molgula that do not have a tadpole stage and have indirect development are located mostly in northern parts of bodies of water. Molgula can inhabit sandy environments to which they are unattached or attached; they also attach to hard rock surfaces. The depth at where they are found varies as the Molgua pugetiensis is found at 15 – 30 meters and Molgula pacifica can be found at 4 meters deep. The species Molgula manhattensis and Molgula ampulloides can be found along shallow water and shorelines where tides can change the water levels.

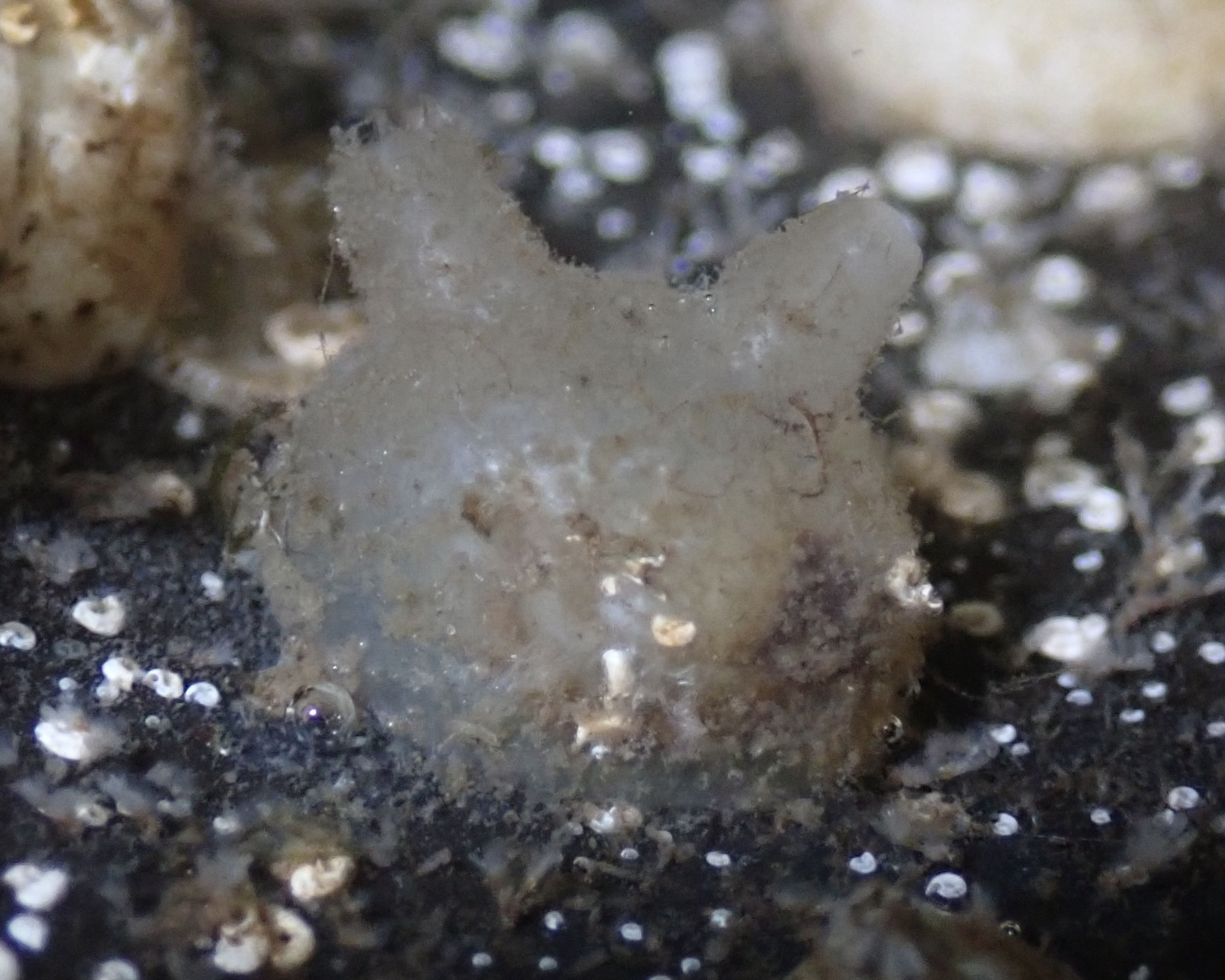
A dusty brown colored Molgula manhattensis

== Evolutionary changes ==
In Molgula occulata there is an evolutionary loss of sensory organ associated melanocytes known as melanogenesis. Melanocytes are cells that produce pigments. The Tyrosinase family genes are crucial for melanogenesis. Members of Molgula occulta have unpigmented and tailless larvae on the other hand members of Molgula oculata have tails that are pigmented. It is found that the ability for melanogenesis comes down to the ability of the Tyrosinase genes to encode for functional proteins. There is a strong correlation between the pseudogenization of the Tyrosinase genes and the absence of pigmentation in the Molgula. Independent mutations in two of the Tyrosinase family genes which causes them to make inactive enzymes. These inactive enzymes are the reason for the loss of pigmentation even though it has the precursors required. The tail loss has been present in 20 tunicate species of the family Mogulidae and has occurred independently.

== Feeding behaviour ==
As briefly mentioned in the lead, in addition to Molgula being suspension feeders they have a restricted diet consisting of detritus and phytoplankton. Two important components of their morphology support this behaviour allowing them to gain nutrients in an optimal way: atrial and oral siphons. Their feeding involves using bodily structures such as gills to add an element of purification of the food particles consumed while being suspended in marine environments. Moreover, Molgula have the structures of siphons to serve the purpose of aiding in both feeding and refuse removal through oral and atrial siphons respectively. Finally, in order to assist in easier breakdown of the food particles, the organisms eaten will be coated in a layer of a gelatinous mixture.

== Environmental influences ==
Deciding how and in what form to spend one’s life is an important decision for all organisms however for Molgula it is of particular importance as it could heavily impact many of their physiological functions. Molgula choose to spend their life as sessile organisms increasing their sensitivity to particular aspects of life compared to other organisms. Additionally, as sessile organisms Molgula can pick what substrate to attach to and sometimes they might choose an organism such as oysters as done by Molgula manhattensis. Ultimately, Molgula has a set of optimal environmental conditions under which it will be able to maximize its strengths and efforts and at which its internal processes will perform with the greatest efficiency. To exemplify, a maximum of 35% salinity should be present in the waters in which Molgula are residing with a minimum of 10% salinity. However, to note exceptions, certain characteristics do not have set minimum or maximum values and can fluctuate between the different levels such as temperature while still maintaining optimization.

== Endosymbiotic relationships ==
Nephromyces is an organism that is fungus-like that is found in the renal sac of Molgula manhattensis and some of the other molgula tunicates, they both have a symbiotic relationship. The Nephromyces is obtained from the water surrounding the Molgula. When the host dies the Nephromyces is released into the water then it can survive in the surrounding water for at least 29 days in which it can infect another Molgula. The Nephromyces doesn’t need a constant host as it can survive in the environment before finding a host. The role of whether the Nephromyces is symbiotic, harmless or parasitic is not known yet.

== Species ==
- Molgula aidae Oka, 1914
- Molgula amesophleba (Codreanu & Mack-Fira, 1956)
- Molgula antiborealis Millar, 1967
- Molgula appendiculata Heller, 1877
- Molgula arenata Stimpson, 1852
- Molgula bacca (Herdman, 1910)
- Molgula bathybia (Hartmeyer, 1912)
- Molgula bisinus Monniot, 1989
- Molgula bleizi (Lacaze-Duthiers, 1877)
- Molgula bourbonis Monniot, 1994
- Molgula braziliensis Millar, 1958
- Molgula brieni Monniot & Monniot, 1976
- Molgula calvata Sluiter, 1904
- Molgula caminae Monniot C. & Monniot F., 1988
- Molgula celata (Michaelsen, 1914)
- Molgula celebensis Millar, 1975
- Molgula celtica Monniot, C., 1970
- Molgula citrina Alder & Hancock, 1848
- Molgula coactilis Monniot & Monniot, 1977
- Molgula complanata Alder & Hancock, 1870
- Molgula conchata Sluiter, 1898
- Molgula confluxa (Sluiter, 1912)
- Molgula contorta Sluiter, 1898
- Molgula cooperi (Huntsman, 1912)
- Molgula crinita Sluiter, 1904
- Molgula crustosa Monniot C. & Monniot F., 1988
- Molgula cryptica Millar, 1962
- Molgula cynthiaeformis Hartmeyer, 1903
- Molgula davidi Monniot, 1972
- Molgula delicata Monniot & Monniot, 1991
- Molgula dextrocarpa Monniot C. & Monniot F., 1974
- Molgula diaguita Monniot & Andrade, 1983
- Molgula dicosta Millar, 1988
- Molgula dione (Savigny, 1816)
- Molgula discogona Millar, 1975
- Molgula diversa Kott, 1972
- Molgula dolichentera Millar, 1960
- Molgula ellistoni Kott, 1972
- Molgula elva Kott, 2008
- Molgula enodis (Sluiter, 1912)
- Molgula eobia Redikorzev, 1941
- Molgula estadosi Monniot & Monniot, 1983
- Molgula eugyroides Traustedt, 1883
- Molgula euplicata Herdman, 1923
- Molgula euprocta Drasche, 1884
- Molgula falsensis Millar, 1955
- Molgula ficus (Macdonald, 1859)
- Molgula flagrifera Sluiter, 1904
- Molgula fortuita Monniot & Monniot, 1984
- Molgula georgiana Michaelsen, 1922
- Molgula gigantea (Cunningham, 1871)
- Molgula griffithsii (MacLeay, 1825)
- Molgula habanensis Van Name, 1945
- Molgula hartmeyeri Oka, 1914
- Molgula helleri Drasche, 1884
- Molgula herdmani Brewin, 1958
- Molgula hirta Monniot F. 1965
- Molgula hodgsoni Herdman, 1910
- Molgula hozawai Oka, 1932
- Molgula impura Heller, 1877
- Molgula incidata Kott, 1985
- Molgula japonica Hartmeyer, 1906
- Molgula karubari Monniot & Monniot, 2003
- Molgula kerguelenensis Kott, 1954
- Molgula kiaeri Hartmeyer, 1901
- Molgula kolaensis Ärnbäck-Christie-Linde, 1928
- Molgula kophameli Michaelsen, 1900
- Molgula lapidifera Redikorzev, 1941
- Molgula longipedata Sluiter, 1904
- Molgula longitubis Monniot, 2002
- Molgula longivascula Millar, 1982
- Molgula lutulenta Herdman, 1923
- Molgula macquariensis Kott, 1954
- Molgula malvinensis Arnback, 1938
- Molgula manhattensis (De Kay, 1843)
- Molgula marioni Millar, 1960
- Molgula millari Kott, 1971
- Molgula mira (Ärnbäck, 1931)
- Molgula mollis Herdman, 1899
- Molgula monodi Peres, 1949
- Molgula mortenseni (Michaelsen, 1922)
- Molgula napiformis Lambert, 1993
- Molgula novaeselandiae (Michaelsen, 1912)
- Molgula occidentalis Traustedt, 1883
- Molgula occulta Kupffer, 1875
- Molgula oculata Forbes, 1848
- Molgula oligostriata Tokioka, 1949
- Molgula oregonia Ritter, 1913
- Molgula pacifica (Huntsman, 1912)
- Molgula pedunculata Herdman, 1881
- Molgula phytophila Monniot, 1970
- Molgula pigafettae Monniot & Monniot, 1983
- Molgula pila Monniot & Monniot, 1985
- Molgula plana Monniot, C., 1971
- Molgula platana Van Name, 1945
- Molgula platei Hartmeyer, 1914
- Molgula platybranchia (Monniot, 1970)
- Molgula primitiva Redikorzev, 1941
- Molgula provisionalis Van Name, 1945
- Molgula pugetiensis Herdman, 1898
- Molgula pulchra Michaelsen, 1900
- Molgula pumila Monniot F. & Monniot C., 1976
- Molgula pyriformis Herdman, 1881
- Molgula redikorzevi Oka, 1914
- Molgula regularis Ritter, 1907
- Molgula retortiformis Verrill, 1871
- Molgula rheophila (Pérès, 1956)
- Molgula riddlei F. Monniot, 2011
- Molgula ridgewayi (Herdman, 1906)
- Molgula rima Kott, 1972
- Molgula robini Monniot & Monniot, 1983
- Molgula robusta (Van Name, 1912)
- Molgula romeri Hartmeyer, 1903
- Molgula rotunda Oka, 1914
- Molgula roulei Monniot C., 1969
- Molgula sabulosa (Quoy & Gaimard, 1834)
- Molgula salvadori Monniot, 1970
- Molgula satyrus Monniot C. & Monniot F., 1993
- Molgula scutata Millar, 1955
- Molgula setigera Arnback, 1938
- Molgula shimodensis Nishikawa, 1982
- Molgula simplex Alder & Hancock, 1870
- Molgula siphonalis Kiaer, 1896
- Molgula siphonata Alder, 1850
- Molgula sluiteri (Michaelsen, 1922)
- Molgula socialis Alder, 1863
- Molgula solenata (Lacaze-Duthiers, 1877)
- Molgula somaliensis Millar, 1988
- Molgula sphaera Kott, 1972
- Molgula spiralis Kott, 1954
- Molgula susana Monniot & Monniot, 1976
- Molgula tagi Michaelsen, 1923
- Molgula taprobane Herdman, 1906
- Molgula tectiformis Nishikawa, 1991
- Molgula tethys Monniot F. & Monniot C., 1974
- Molgula topata Monniot & Monniot, 1987
- Molgula tubifera (Orstedt, 1844)
- Molgula tzetlini Sanamyan, 1993
- Molgula undulata (Tokioka, 1949)
- Molgula vara Monniot C. & Monniot F., 1979
- Molgula variazizi Monniot, 1978
- Molgula verrilli (Van Name, 1912)
- Molgula verrucifera Ritter & Forsyth, 1917
- Molgula xenophora Oka, 1914
