= Pareugyrioides =

Scientific classification
- Kingdom: Animalia
- Phylum: Chordata
- Subphylum: Tunicata
- Class: Ascidiacea
- Order: Stolidobranchia
- Family: Molgulidae
- Genus: Pareugyrioides; Hartmeyer, 1914

Genus of sea squirts

Pareugyrioides is a genus of marine tunicates.

== Species ==
- Pareugyrioides arnbackae (Millar, 1960)
- Pareugyrioides chardyi Monniot C. & Monniot F., 1977
- Pareugyrioides dalli (Ritter, 1913)
- Pareugyrioides digitus Monniot, 1997
- Pareugyrioides exigua (Kott, 1972)
- Pareugyrioides flagrifera (Sluiter, 1904)
- Pareugyrioides galatheae (Millar, 1959)
- Pareugyrioides longipedata (Sluiter, 1904)
- Pareugyrioides macquariensis Kott, 1954
- Pareugyrioides macrentera (Millar, 1962)
- Pareugyrioides vannamei (Monniot, 1970)

Species names currently considered to be synonyms:

- Pareugyrioides bostrychobranchus Redikorzev, 1941: synonym of Pareugyrioides dalli (Ritter, 1913)
- Pareugyrioides filholi (Pizon, 1898): synonym of Paramolgula filholi (Pizon, 1898)
- Pareugyrioides flagifera (Sluiter, 1904): synonym of Pareugyrioides flagrifera (Sluiter, 1904)
- Pareugyrioides galathea : synonym of Pareugyrioides galatheae (Millar, 1959)
- Pareugyrioides japonica Hartmeyer, 1914: synonym of Eugyra glutinans (Moeller, 1842)
