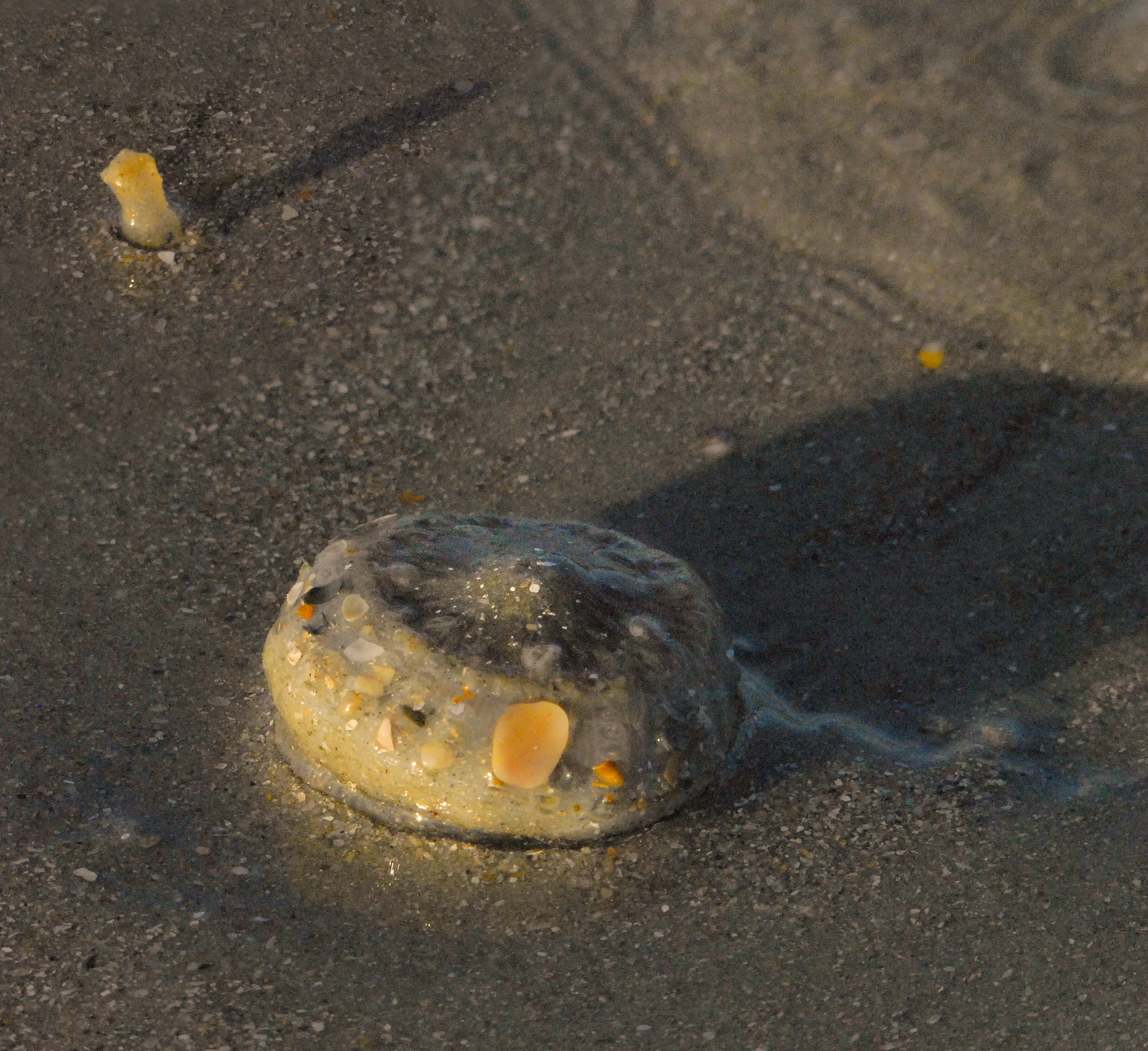

Scientific classification
- Domain: Eukaryota
- Kingdom: Animalia
- Phylum: Chordata
- Subphylum: Tunicata
- Class: Ascidiacea
- Order: Stolidobranchia
- Family: Molgulidae
- Genus: Molgula
- Species: M. occidentalis

Binomial name
- Molgula occidentalis Traustedt, 1883

= Molgula occidentalis =

Species of sea squirt

Molgula occidentalis is a species of marine invertebrate of the family Molgulidae. The scientific name of the species was validated and published for the first time in 1883 by Traustedt. It is a soft-bodied, intertidal ascidian, sac-like filter feeders in the subphylum tunicate characterized by a hard outer covering known as a “tunic,” abundant in the shallow subtidal and intertidal zones of the Northern Gulf of Mexico, where they establish pseudopopulations.

== Description ==
These ascidians have soft bodies but are covered by a hard, protective tunic as they are part of the subphylum tunicate. They are sessile intertidal organisms. The tunic contains hair like extensions of the epidermis known as ampullae, which are hollow and tubular. Ampullae grow shortly after the larvae settles in the sediments and are used to form a strong attachment to grains of sand. The grains of sand hold it down as the juvenile forms around seven to nine ampullae to create a secure attachment to soft sediments or hard substrates surrounding the organism. Adult M. occidentalis cover themselves in a layer of sand and use the ampullae to secure the sand on top of them in order to camouflage and protect them from predators.

== Environment ==
Molgula occidentalis occupy soft bottoms. They are sessile organisms as juveniles and adults after the larvae settle. The larvae may settle on hard or soft substrates, adhering to rocks, shells, sea grasses, or other ascidians but most often rest on sandy or muddy substrates. Their larvae are pelagic and they lack a tadpole stage because currents carrying them to shores where they settle in the intertidal or subtidal zone and form a temporary pseudopopulation. Because of this, larvae do best in high current systems. These pseudopopulations typically only survive for a short time and are not self-sustaining. They typically settle during the spring and summer months, reach sexual maturity, then die come the winter months as freezing temperatures and prolonged exposure due to low tide have adverse effects on the organisms. They are limited by vertical zonation: adults can inhabit deeper depths but larvae cannot and they are limited by desiccation if they settle to high so they inhabit the edge of pools no more than a few centimeters above or below low tide.

== Ecology ==
They occur most abundantly in areas where seagrasses, specifically Ruppia maritima, stabilize the sediments because increased sediments in the water and movement of sediments can have adverse effects on the organisms.

They are preyed upon by the gastropod Fasciolaria hunteria. This snail inserts its probuscus into a siphon found on the M. occidentalis and consumes the ascidian's internal organs, leaving the tunicate untouched.

== Reproduction and Life cycle ==
Adult M. occidentalis are simultaneous hermaphrodites and are capable of self-fertilization. Once fertilized, they have a very short embryonic period, averaging about 12.5 hours under ideal conditions. Ascidian eggs have different cytoplasmic patterns that influence the embryonic tissues and the fate of the blastomeres. The distribution of the cytoplasmic components are produced by the movement of the contents of oocytes during a process known as ooplasmic segregation. Because they are ascidians, they are part of the phylum chordata and have a notochord in the larval stage, but lose it when they metamorphose into adults.
