= Paramolgula =

Scientific classification
- Domain: Eukaryota
- Kingdom: Animalia
- Phylum: Chordata
- Subphylum: Tunicata
- Class: Ascidiacea
- Order: Stolidobranchia
- Family: Molgulidae
- Genus: Paramolgula; Traustedt, 1835

Genus of sea squirts

Paramolgula is a genus of marine tunicates.

== Species ==
- Paramolgula canioi Monniot & Monniot, 1983
- Paramolgula chilensis Hartmeyer, 1914
- Paramolgula filholi (Pizon, 1898)
- Paramolgula gregaria (Lesson, 1830)

Species names currently considered to be synonyms:

- Paramolgula arctica Bonnevie, 1896: synonym of Eugyra glutinans (Moeller, 1842)
- Paramolgula gigantea (Cunningham, 1871): synonym of Paramolgula gregaria (Lesson, 1830)
- Paramolgula guttula Michaelsen, 1900: synonym of Eugyra kerguelenensis Herdman, 1881
- Paramolgula horrida (Herdman, 1881): synonym of Paramolgula gregaria (Lesson, 1830)
- Paramolgula patagonica Michaelsen, 1900: synonym of Paramolgula gregaria (Lesson, 1830)
- Paramolgula rara Kiaer, 1896: synonym of Eugyra glutinans (Moeller, 1842)
- Paramolgula schulzei Traustedt, 1885: synonym of Paramolgula gregaria (Lesson, 1830)
- Paramolgula symetrica (Drasche, 1884): synonym of Eugyra symmetrica Drasche, 1884
- Paramolgula symmetrica (Drasche, 1884): synonym of Eugyra symmetrica Drasche, 1884
- Paramolgula villosa (Pizon, 1898): synonym of Paramolgula gregaria (Lesson, 1830)
