= Anomopera =

Scientific classification
- Kingdom: Animalia
- Phylum: Chordata
- Subphylum: Tunicata
- Class: Ascidiacea
- Order: Stolidobranchia
- Family: Molgulidae
- Genus: Anomopera; Hartmeyer, 1923
- Species: A. ingolfiana

Binomial name
- Anomopera ingolfiana Hartmeyer, 1923

Genus of sea squirts

Anomopera is a genus of ascidian tunicates in the family Molgulidae. Anomopera ingolfiana is the only described species of Anomopera.
