= Protomolgula =

Scientific classification
- Kingdom: Animalia
- Phylum: Chordata
- Subphylum: Tunicata
- Class: Ascidiacea
- Order: Stolidobranchia
- Family: Molgulidae
- Genus: Protomolgula; Monniot, 1971

Species
- See text

Genus of sea squirts

Protomolgula is a genus of ascidian tunicates in the family Molgulidae.

Species within the genus Protomolgula include:

- Protomolgula bythia Monniot F., 1971
- Protomolgula cornuta Monniot & Monniot, 1991
- Protomolgula triangularis Millar, 1982
