= Molguloides =

Scientific classification
- Domain: Eukaryota
- Kingdom: Animalia
- Phylum: Chordata
- Subphylum: Tunicata
- Class: Ascidiacea
- Order: Stolidobranchia
- Family: Molgulidae
- Genus: Molguloides; Huntsman, 1922

Genus of sea squirts

Molguloides is a genus of marine tunicates.

== Species ==
- Molguloides bathybia (Hartmeyer, 1912)
- Molguloides coronatum Monniot, 1978
- Molguloides crenatum Monniot C. & Monniot F., 1974
- Molguloides crinibus Monniot, 1978
- Molguloides cyclocarpa Monniot & Monniot, 1982
- Molguloides glans Monniot, 1978
- Molguloides immunda (Hartmeyer, 1909)
- Molguloides longirecta Monniot & Monniot, 1985
- Molguloides mollis Monniot & Monniot, 1991
- Molguloides monocarpa (Millar, 1959)
- Molguloides sibuetae Monniot, 1997
- Molguloides sphaeroidea (Millar, 1970)
- Molguloides sulcatus Sanamyan & Sanamyan, 1999
- Molguloides tenuis Kott, 1954
- Molguloides tonsus Monniot & Monniot, 1991
- Molguloides translucidus Monniot & Monniot, 1991
- Molguloides vitrea (Sluiter, 1904)

Species names currently considered to be synonyms:

- Molguloides vitreus (Sluiter, 1904): synonym of Molguloides vitrea (Sluiter, 1904)
