= Namiella =

Scientific classification
- Kingdom: Animalia
- Phylum: Chordata
- Subphylum: Tunicata
- Class: Ascidiacea
- Order: Stolidobranchia
- Family: Molgulidae
- Genus: Namiella; Monniot & Monniot, 1968
- Species: N. bistigmata

Binomial name
- Namiella bistigmata Monniot & Monniot, 1968

Genus of sea squirts

Namiella is a genus of ascidian tunicates in the family Molgulidae. The only species is Namiella bistigmata.
