= Bostrichobranchus =

Scientific classification
- Kingdom: Animalia
- Phylum: Chordata
- Subphylum: Tunicata
- Class: Ascidiacea
- Order: Stolidobranchia
- Family: Molgulidae
- Genus: Bostrichobranchus; Traustedt, 1883

Species
- See text

Genus of sea squirts

Bostrichobranchus is a genus of ascidian tunicates in the family Molgulidae.

Species within the genus Bostrichobranchus include:

- Bostrichobranchus digonas Abbott, 1951
- Bostrichobranchus pilularis (Verrill, 1871)
- Bostrichobranchus septum Monniot, 1978

Species names currently considered to be synonyms:

- Bostrichobranchus manhattensis Traustedt, 1883: synonym of Bostrichobranchus pilularis (Verrill, 1871)
- Bostrichobranchus molguloides Metcalf, 1900: synonym of Bostrichobranchus pilularis (Verrill, 1871)
