= Oligotrema =

Scientific classification
- Domain: Eukaryota
- Kingdom: Animalia
- Phylum: Chordata
- Subphylum: Tunicata
- Class: Ascidiacea
- Order: Stolidobranchia
- Family: Molgulidae
- Genus: Oligotrema; Bourne, 1903

Genus of sea squirts

Oligotrema is a genus of marine tunicates.

== Species ==
- Oligotrema lyra Monniot C. & Monniot F., 1973
- Oligotrema psammatodes (Sluiter, 1905)
- Oligotrema psammites Bourne, 1903
- Oligotrema sandersi (Monniot C. & Monniot F., 1968)
- Oligotrema unigonas (Monniot C. & Monniot F., 1974)

Species names currently considered to be synonyms:

- Oligotrema arcticus Hartmeyer, 1923: synonym of Asajirus arcticus (Hartmeyer, 1923)
- Oligotrema indicus (Oka, 1913): synonym of Asajirus indicus (Oka, 1913)
