= Asajirus =

Scientific classification
- Domain: Eukaryota
- Kingdom: Animalia
- Phylum: Chordata
- Subphylum: Tunicata
- Class: Ascidiacea
- Order: Stolidobranchia
- Family: Molgulidae
- Genus: Asajirus; Kott, 1989

Genus of sea squirts

Asajirus is a genus of marine tunicates. Asajirus indicus was found on the Antarctic Peninsula, west of Palmer Archipelago at a depth of 2763-2818m.

== Species ==
- Asajirus arcticus (Hartmeyer, 1923)
- Asajirus dichotomus (Monniot & Monniot, 1984)
- Asajirus eunuchus (Monniot F. & Monniot C., 1976)
- Asajirus gulosus (Monniot & Monniot, 1984)
- Asajirus hemisphericus (Monniot & Monniot, 1990)
- Asajirus indicus (Oka, 1913)
- Asajirus ledanoisi (Monniot C. & Monniot F., 1990)
- Asajirus ovirarus (Monniot & Monniot, 1990)
