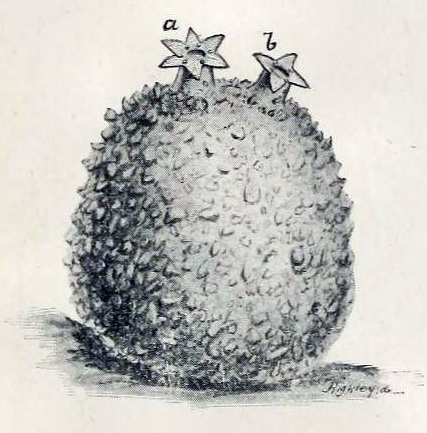
- Sea grape (Molgula oculata) a) buccal siphon; b) atrial siphon

Scientific classification
- Kingdom: Animalia
- Phylum: Chordata
- Subphylum: Tunicata
- Class: Ascidiacea
- Order: Stolidobranchia
- Family: Molgulidae

Genera
- See text

Synonyms
- Hexacrobylidae

= Molgulidae =

Family of sea squirts

Molgulidae is a family of tunicates in the class Ascidiacea. Following a revision in 2007, the family Hexacrobylidae was synonymized with Molgulidae.

== Genera ==
The World Register of Marine Species lists the following genera:

- Anomopera Hartmeyer, 1923
- Asajirus Kott, 1989
- Bostrichobranchus Traustedt, 1883
- Eugyra Alder & Hancock, 1870
- Fungulus Herdman, 1882
- Gamaster Pizon, 1896
- Minipera Monniot & Monniot, 1974
- Molgula Forbes, 1848
- Molguloides Huntsman, 1922
- Namiella Monniot & Monniot, 1968
- Oligotrema Bourne, 1903
- Paramolgula Traustedt, 1835
- Pareugyrioides Hartmeyer, 1914
- Protomolgula Monniot, 1971
- Rhizomolgula Ritter, 1901
