= Largest and heaviest animals =

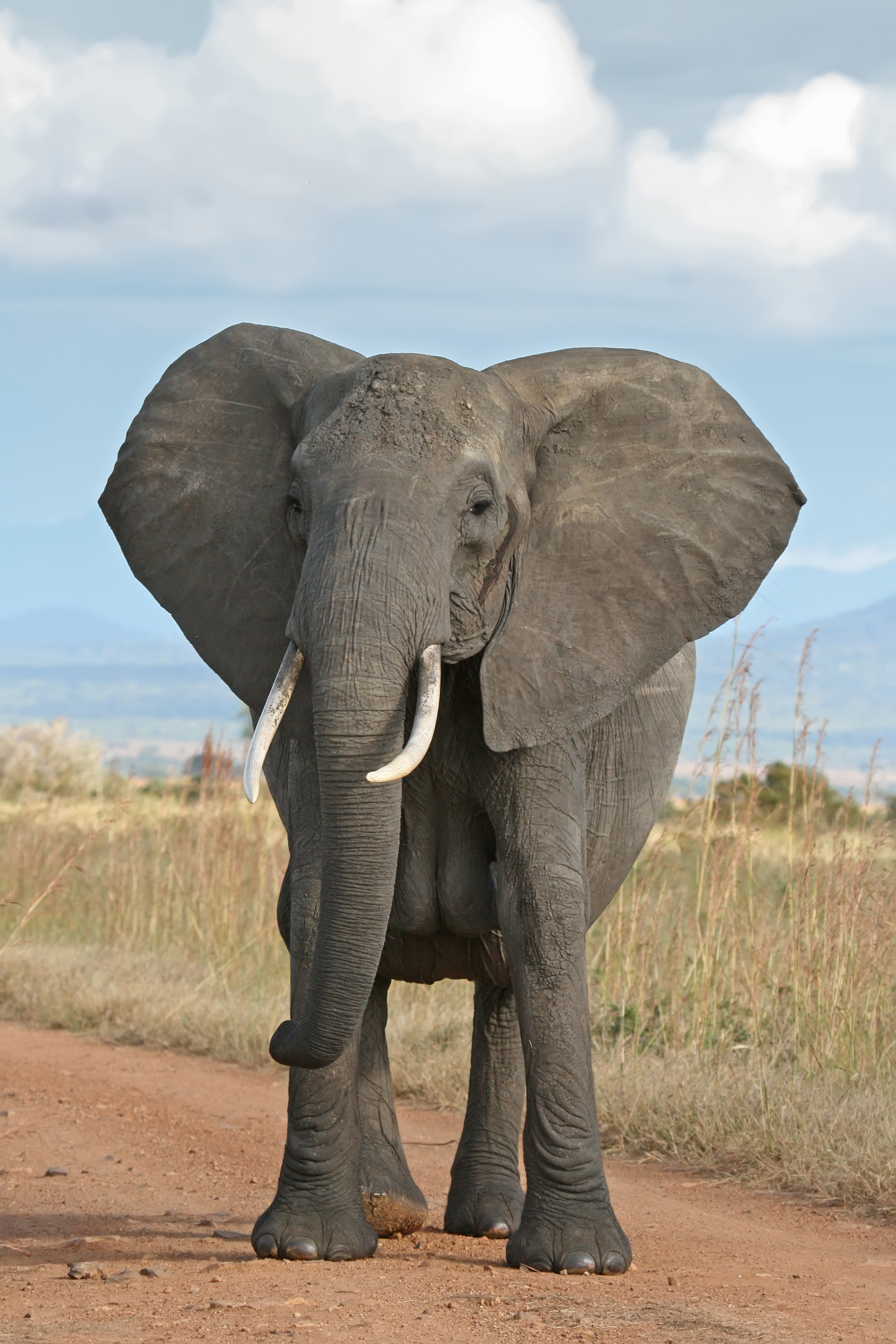
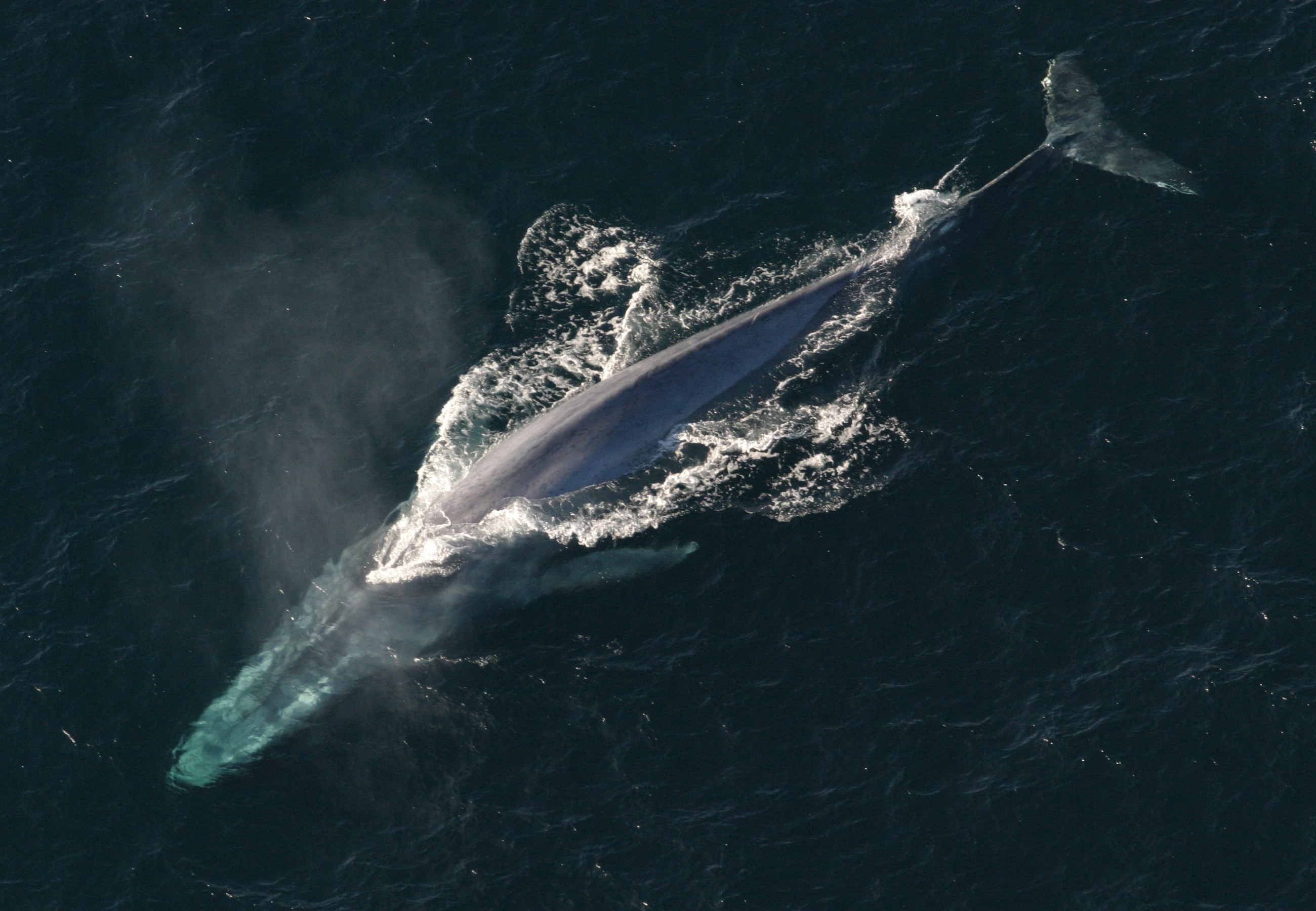
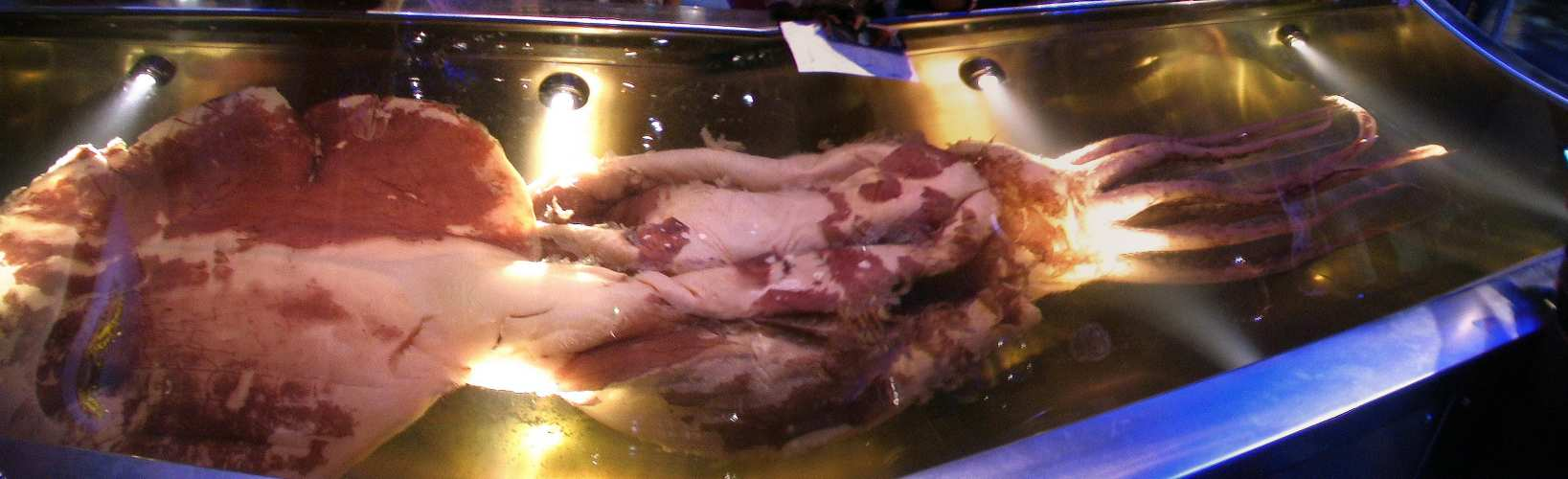
Clockwise from top left: an African bush elephant, the largest extant terrestrial animal; a blue whale, the largest animal ever to exist; and a colossal squid, the largest invertebrate

The largest extant animal, as well as the largest animal to ever exist, is the blue whale. The maximum recorded weight was 190 tonnes for a specimen measuring 27.6 metres (91 ft), whereas longer ones, up to 33.6 metres (110 ft), have been recorded but not weighed. It is estimated that this individual could have a mass of 250 tonnes or more. The longest non-colonial animal is the lion's mane jellyfish (120 ft, 36.6 m).

While controversial, estimates for the weight of the sauropod Bruhathkayosaurus suggest it was around 110–170 tons, with the highest estimate being 240 tons, if scaled with Patagotitan, although actual fossil remains no longer exist, and that estimation is based on described dimensions in 1987. Similarly, the extinct whale Perucetus was initially estimated in 2023 to have a mass of 85 to 340 t (94–375 short tons; 84–335 long tons). However, more recent studies suggest this whale was much smaller than previous estimates, with a 2024 study putting its weight at 60 to 113 tonnes, while a 2025 study further downsized its weight to 35 to 40 tonnes.

In April 2024, Ichthyotitan severnensis was established as a valid shastasaurid taxon and is considered both the largest marine reptile ever discovered and the largest macropredator ever discovered. The Lilstock specimen was estimated to be around 26 metres (85 ft) whilst the Aust specimen was an even more impressive 30 to 35 metres (98 to 115 ft) in length (however, the Aust specimen or 'Aust Colossus' may not belong to Ichthyotitan). While no weight estimates have been made as of yet, Ichthyotitan would have easily rivalled or surpassed the blue whale. The upper estimates of weight for these prehistoric animals would have easily rivaled or exceeded the largest rorquals and sauropods. However, an as-yet undescribed shastasaurid, informally referred to as 'Aust Colossus', may have exceeded Ichthyotitan in size, potentially making it the largest known marine reptile. It has been estimated at approximately 30 metres in length, which would surpass the blue whale; however, the authors note that this estimate is highly speculative.

The African bush elephant (Loxodonta africana) is the largest living land animal. A native of various open habitats in sub-Saharan Africa, males weigh about 6 tonnes (13,000 lb) on average. The largest elephant ever recorded was shot in Angola in 1974. It was a male measuring 10.67 metres (35.0 ft) from trunk to tail and 4.17 metres (13.7 ft) lying on its side in a projected line from the highest point of the shoulder, to the base of the forefoot, indicating a standing shoulder height of 3.96 metres (13.0 ft). This male had a computed weight of 10.4 to 12.25 tonnes.

== Heaviest living animals ==
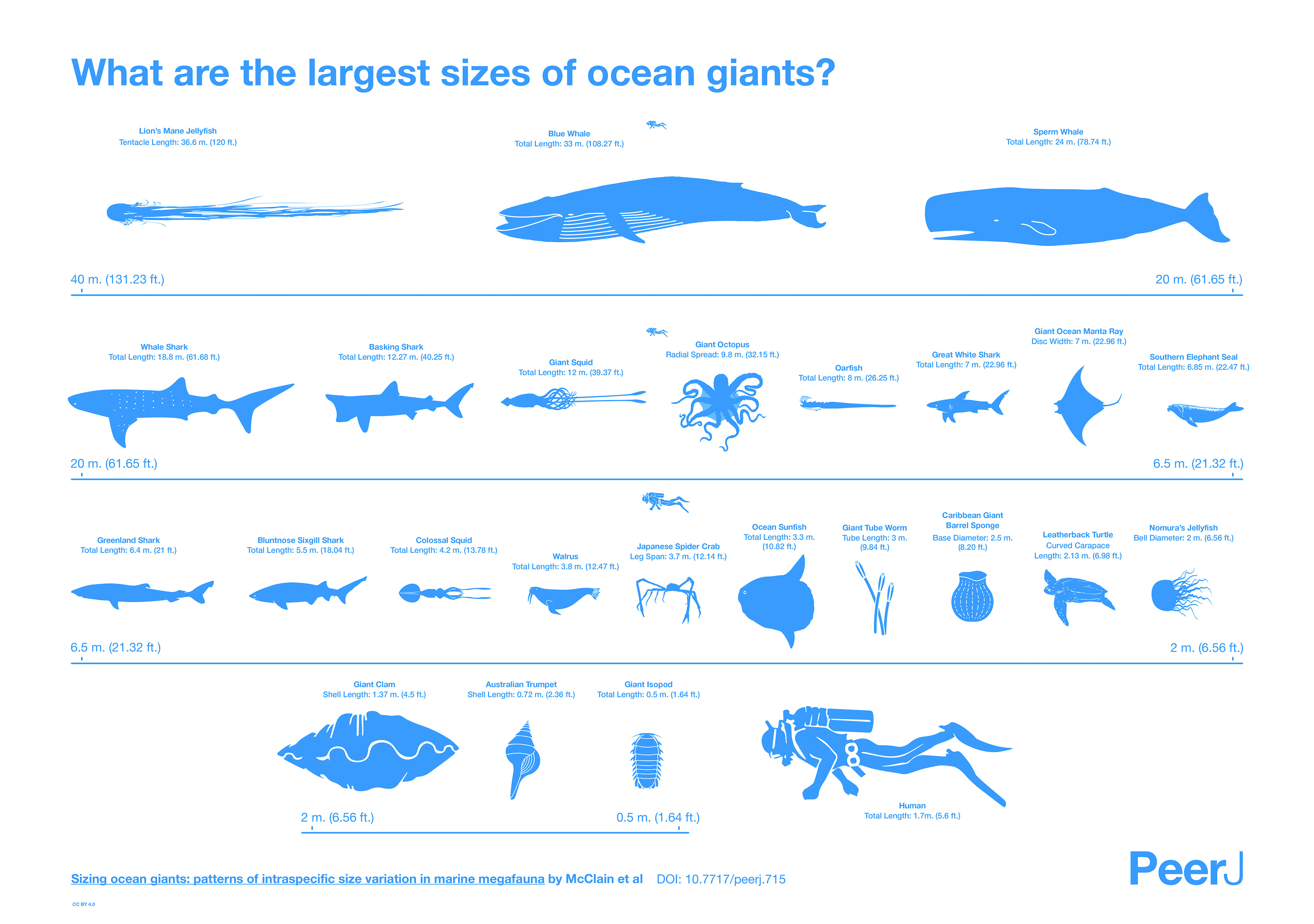
Infographic showing the size of marine megafauna

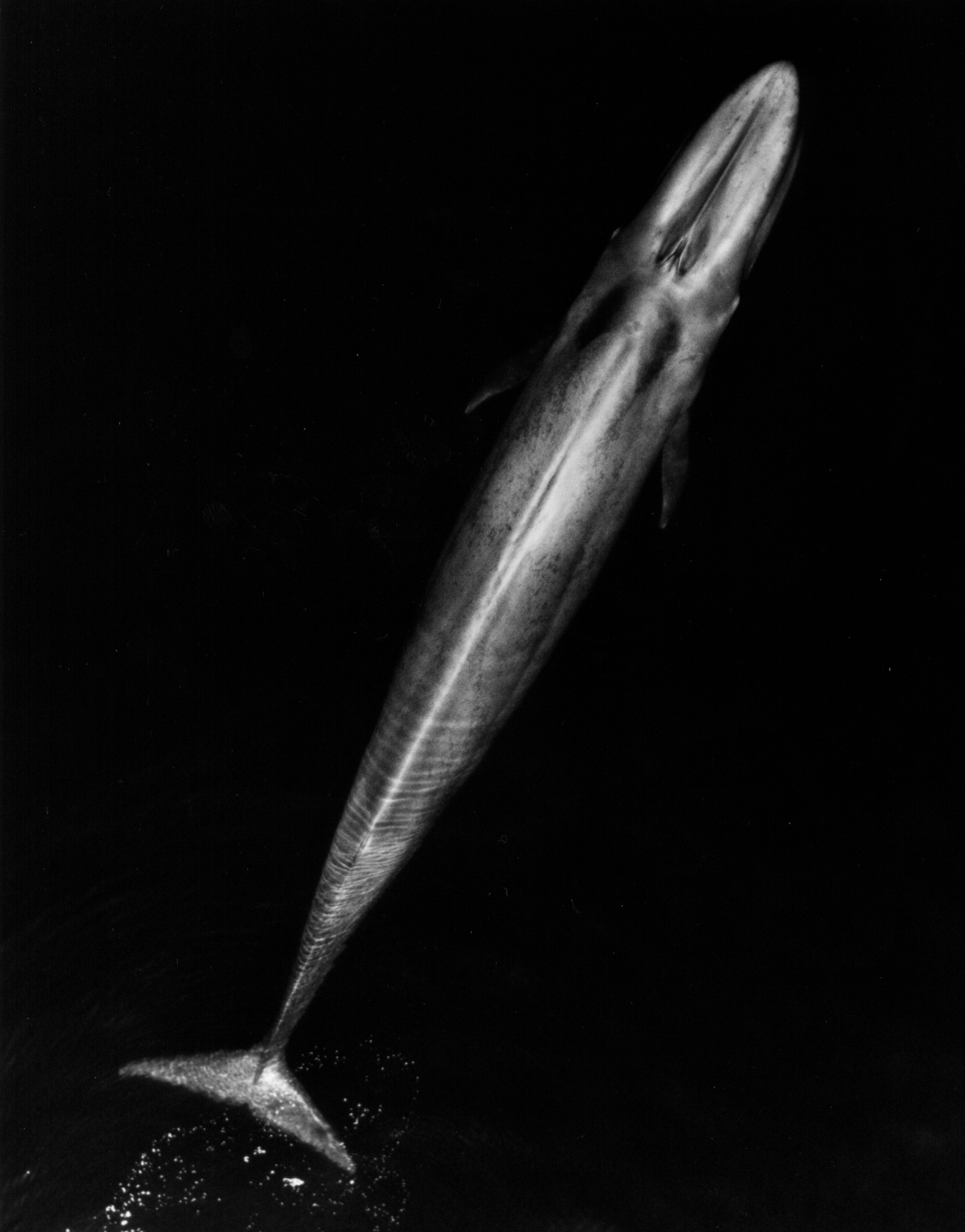
The blue whale is the heaviest living animal.

The heaviest living animals are all whales. There are considerable obstacles to overcome in obtaining accurate weights for them, however, as no scale can accommodate the whole body of a large whale. Whaling factories are usually enlisted to help accomplish the task, but it still remains difficult, and most weighings have been done by parts of flensed whales, leaving much room for error. Mathematical formulas have also been devised to estimate the average weight of various whale species based on body length, but this method is equally prone to inaccuracy.

Rank	Animal	Average mass in tonnes	Maximum mass in tonnes	Average total length in m (ft)
1	Blue whale	110	190	24 (79)
2	North Pacific right whale	60	120	15.5 (51)
3	Southern right whale	58	110	15.25 (50)
4	Fin whale	57	120	21 (69)
5	Bowhead whale	54.5	120	15 (49)
6	North Atlantic right whale	54	110	15 (49)
7	Sperm whale	31.25	80	13.25 (43.5)
8	Humpback whale	29	48	13.5 (44)
9	Sei whale	22.5	45	14.8 (49)
10	Gray whale	19.5	45	13.5 (44)

== Heaviest terrestrial animals ==
The heaviest land animals are all mammals. The African elephant is now listed as two species, the African bush elephant and the African forest elephant, as they are now generally considered to be.

Rank	Animal	Average mass in tonnes	Maximum mass in tonnes	Average total length in m (ft)
1	African bush elephant	6	10.4	7.5 (24.6)
2	Asian elephant	4	7	6.5 (21.3)
3	African forest elephant	2.7	6	6.2 (20.3)
4	White rhinoceros	2	4.5	4.4 (14.4)
5	Indian rhinoceros	1.9	4	4.2 (13.8)
6	Hippopotamus	1.8	4.5	5.05 (16.5)
7	Javan rhinoceros	1.75	2.3	3.8 (12.5)
8	Black rhinoceros	1.1	2.9	4 (13.1)
9	Giraffe	1	2	5.15 (16.9)
10	Gaur	0.95	1.5	3.8 (12.5)

== Vertebrates ==
=== Mammals (Mammalia) ===
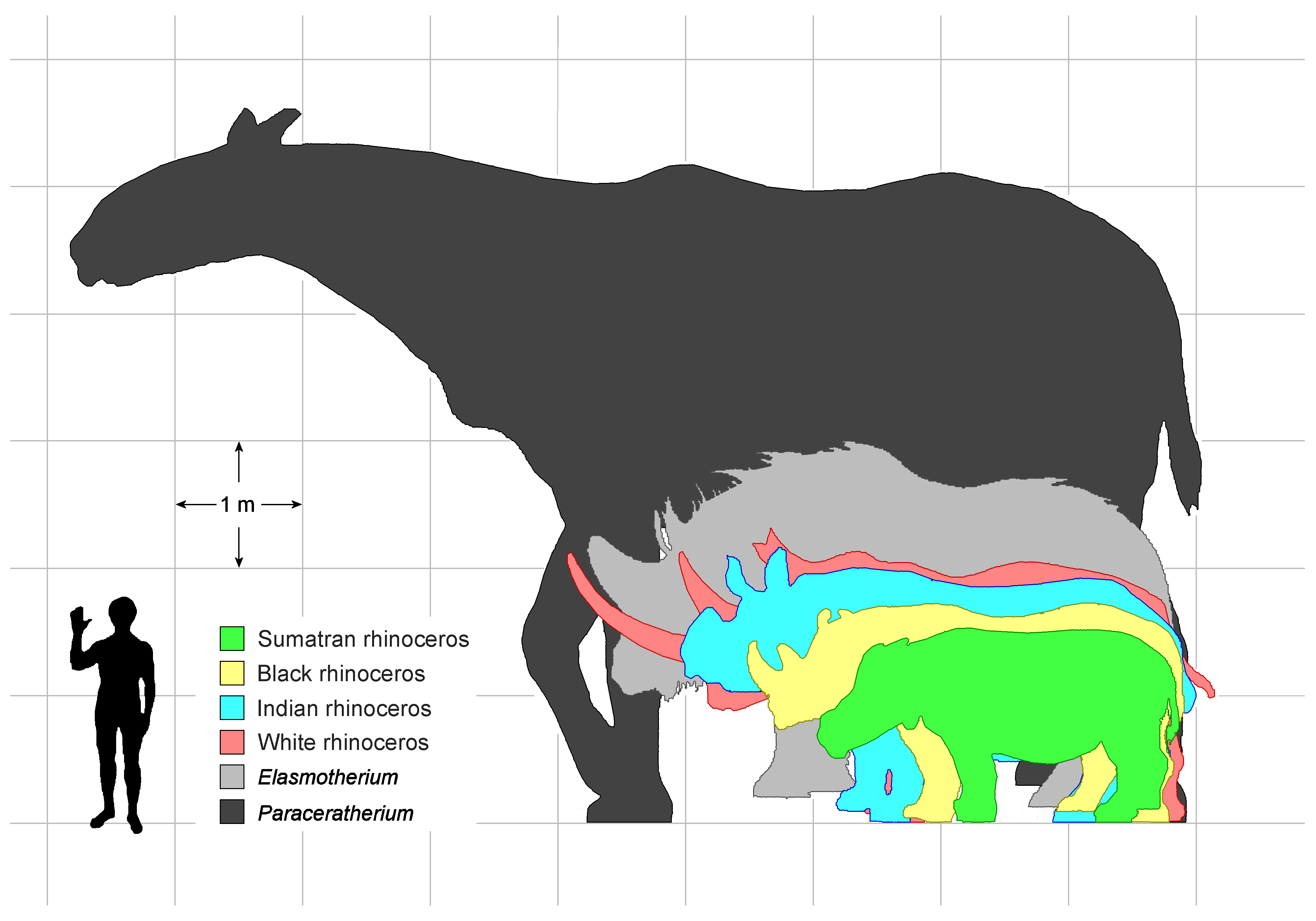
Size of Paraceratherium (dark grey) compared to a human and other rhinos (though studies suggest that Palaeoloxodon namadicus and Dzungariotherium may have been larger land mammals)

The blue whale is the largest animal, and therefore the largest mammal, of all time, with the longest known specimen being 33 m (108.3 ft) long and the heaviest weighted specimen being 190 tonnes. The extinct whale species Perucetus colossus was shorter than the blue whale, at 17.0–20.1 meters (55.8–65.9 ft) but it is estimated to have rivaled or surpassed it in weight, at 85–340 tonnes. At the highest estimates, this would make Perucetus the heaviest known animal in history, although more recent estimates put it at a more moderate 60 to 113 tonnesor 35 to 40 tonnes

The largest land mammal extant today is the African bush elephant. The largest extinct land mammal known was long considered to be Paraceratherium orgosensis, a rhinoceros relative thought to have stood up to 4.8 m (15.7 ft) tall, measured over 7.4 m (24.3 ft) long and may have weighed about 17 tonnes. In 2015, a study suggested that the extinct elephant Palaeoloxodon namadicus may have been the largest land mammal ever, based on a fragmentary femur estimated to belong to an individual with maximum weight of 22 tonnes. This author also suggested that the extinct mastodon "Mammut" borsoni may have rivalled P. namadicus in size. However, these estimates remain debated due to the fragmentary nature of the fossil material and the uncertainties involved in scaling from limited remains. In 2022, a study proposed that Dzungariotherium may be the largest paracerathere, surpassing even Paraceratherium, thus representing another contender for the largest terrestrial mammal ever, with estimates of approximately 20.6 tonnes.

=== Stem-mammals (Synapsida) ===
Lisowicia bojani, likely the biggest non-mammal synapsid ever, compared to a human

The Late Triassic Lisowicia bojani, from what is now southern Poland, probably was the largest of all non-mammalian synapsids (most of which became extinct 250 million years ago), at 4.5 m (15 ft) in length, 2.6 m (8.5 ft) in height and 9 t (20,000 lb) in weight. However, one study suggested a more conservative weight of 4.87 tonnes to 7.02 tonnes for the adult taxon, with an average body mass of 5.88 tonnes. The largest carnivorous synapsid was Anteosaurus at 5–6 m (16–20 ft) and 500–600 kg (1,100–1,300 lb).

==== Caseasaurs (Caseasauria) ====
The herbivorous Alierasaurus was the largest caseid and the largest amniote to have lived at the time, with an estimated length around 6–7 m (20–23 ft). Another huge caseasaur is Cotylorhynchus hancocki, with an estimated length and weight of at least 6 m (20 ft) and more than 500 kg (1,100 lb).

==== Sphenacodontids (Sphenacodontidae) ====
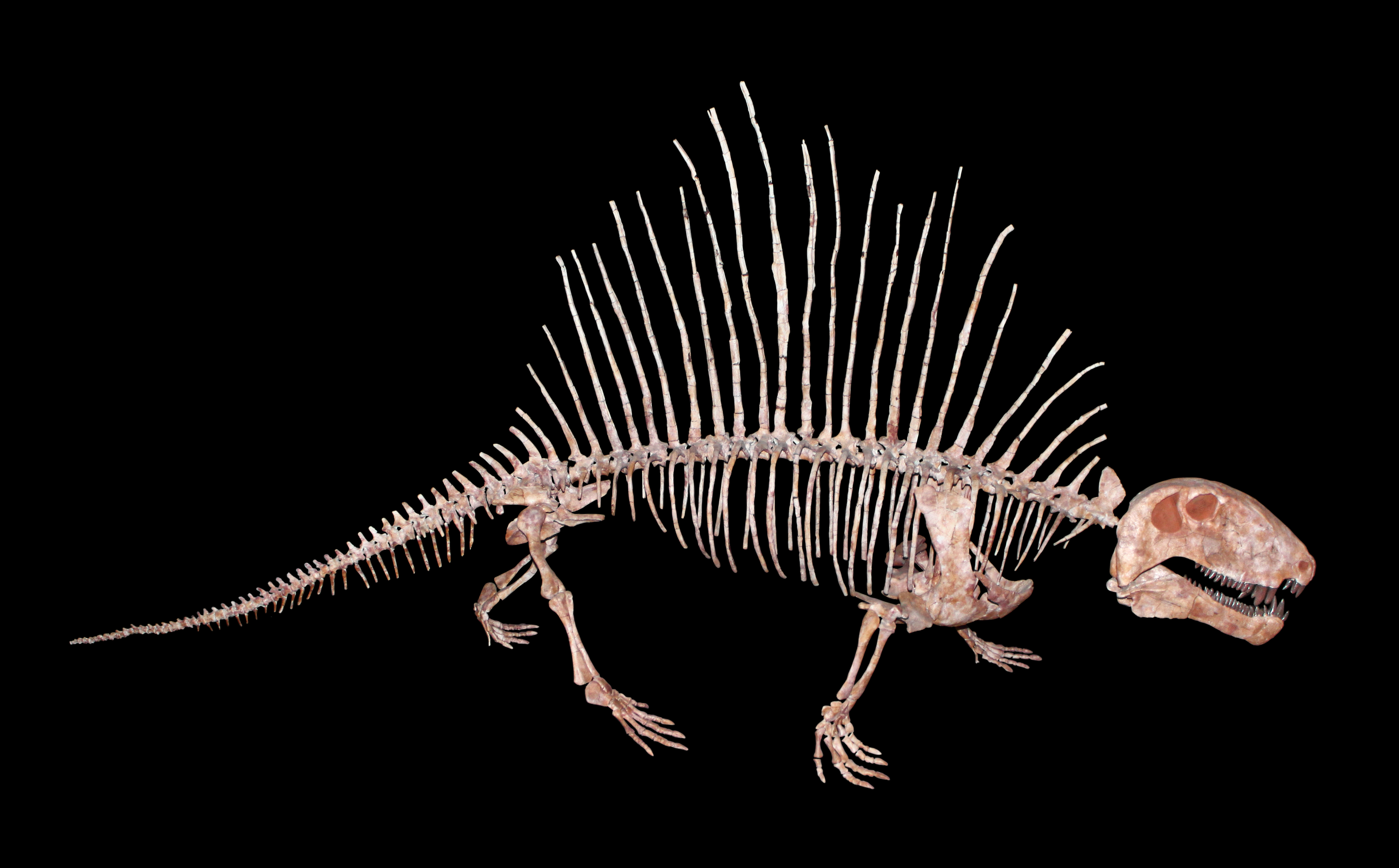
Dimetrodon fossil

The biggest carnivorous synapsid of the Early Permian was Dimetrodon, which could reach 4.6 m (15 ft) and 250 kg (550 lb). The largest members of the genus Dimetrodon were also the world's first fully terrestrial apex predators.

==== Tappenosaurids (Tappenosauridae) ====
The Middle Permian Tappenosaurus was estimated at 5.5 m (18 ft) in length which is comparable in size with the largest dinocephalians.

==== Therapsids (Therapsida) ====
The plant-eating dicynodont Lisowicia bojani is the largest-known of all non-mammalian synapsids, at 4.5 m (15 ft) and 9,000 kg (20,000 lb). The largest carnivorous therapsid was the aforementioned Anteosaurus from what is now South Africa during the Middle Permian epoch. It reached 5–6 m (16–20 ft) long, and about 500–600 kg (1,100–1,300 lb) in weight.

=== Reptiles (Reptilia) ===
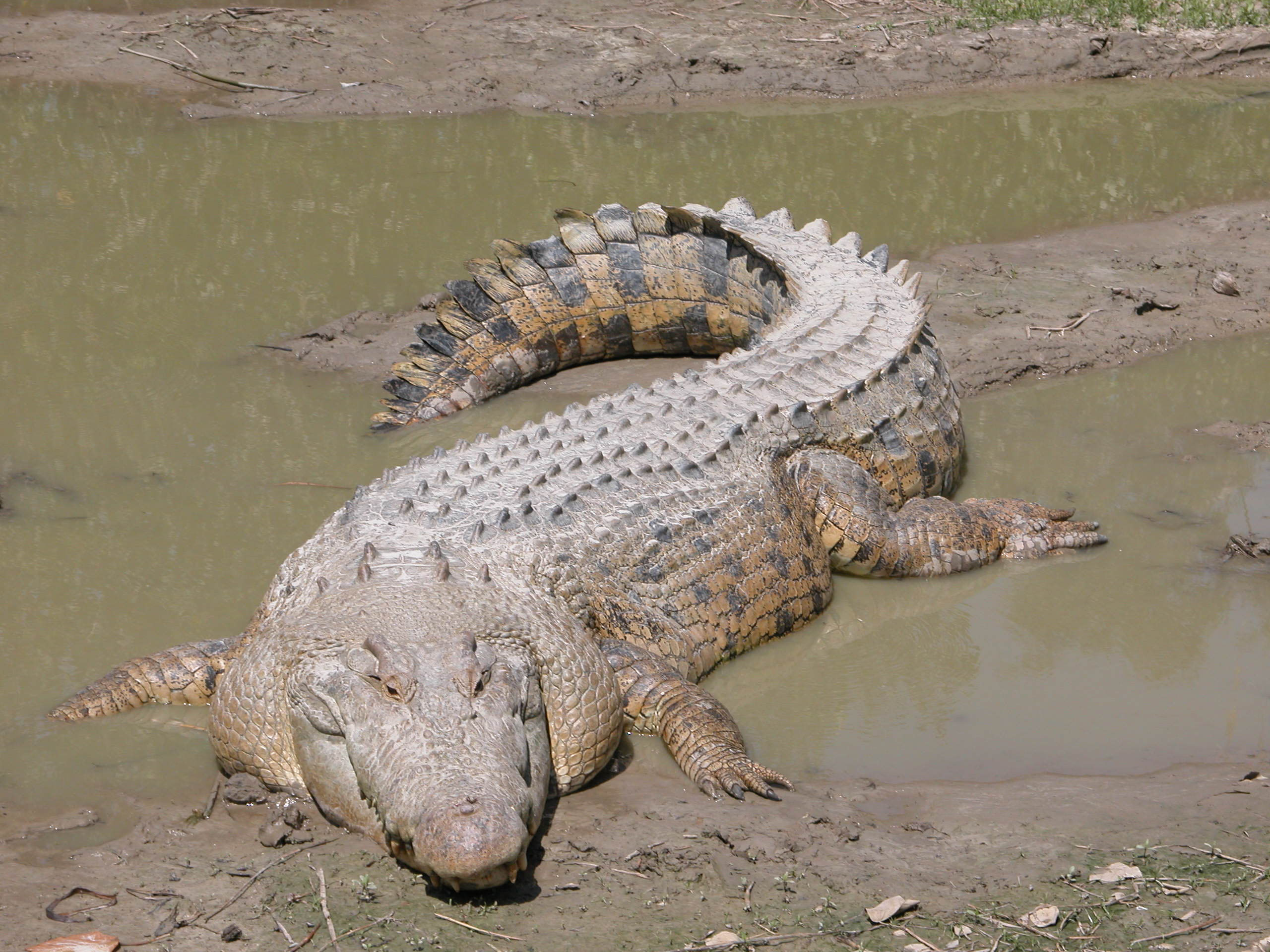
The saltwater crocodile is the largest living reptile.

Ichthyotitan, one of the largest reptiles of all time

The largest living reptile, a representative of the order Crocodilia, is the saltwater crocodile (Crocodylus porosus) of Southern Asia and Australia, with adult males being typically 3.9–5.5 m (13–18 ft) long. The largest confirmed saltwater crocodile on record was 6.32 m (20.7 ft) long, and weighed about 1,360 kg (3,000 lb). Unconfirmed reports of much larger crocodiles exist, but examinations of incomplete remains have never suggested a length greater than 7 m (23 ft). Also, a living specimen estimated at 7 m (23 ft) and 2,000 kg (4,400 lb) has been accepted by the Guinness Book of World Records. However, due to the difficulty of trapping and measuring a very large living crocodile, the accuracy of these dimensions has yet to be verified. A specimen named Lolong caught alive in the Philippines in 2011 (died February 2013) was found to have measured 6.17 m (20.2 ft) in length.

The Komodo dragon (Varanus komodoensis), also known as the "Komodo monitor", is a large species of lizard found in the Indonesian islands of Komodo, Rinca, Flores, Gili Motang, Nusa kode and Padar. A member of the monitor lizard family (Varanidae), it is the largest living species of lizard, growing to a maximum length of more than 3 metres (9.8 feet) in rare cases and weighing up to approximately 166 kilograms (366 pounds).

Nevertheless, current extant reptiles are still dwarfed by their prehistoric ancestors. The largest non-dinosaurian terrestrial reptile to have ever lived were crocodilomorphs such as Deinosuchus, Sarcosuchus and Purussaurus, each have weight varying between 5–10 metric tons. The largest snake to have ever lived was Titanoboa which could grow up to 12.8–14.3 m (42–47 ft) and weigh up to 730–1,135 kg (1,609–2,502 lb). Prehistoric marine reptiles from the Mesozoic were even larger. Archelon was the largest testudines, being around 4.6 m (15 ft) long from head to tail and 2.2–3.2 t (2.4–3.5 short tons) in weight. Mosasaurus hoffmanni was the largest squamate lizard to have ever lived, with a length of 11 meters (36 ft) and a body mass of 10 metric tons (11 short tons) However, the largest reptiles were the shastasaurids, specifically Ichthyotitan, which approached lengths rivalling to exceeding those of a blue whale, with confirmed the holotype specimen and a referred specimen from Lilstock measuring 25 metres (82 ft). There is also an undescribed shastasaurid from the Aust cliffs around 30–35 m (98–115 ft) in length. It has been informally referred to as the Aust Colossus.

==== Largest living reptiles ====
The following is a list of the largest living reptile species ranked by average weight, which is dominated by the crocodilians. Unlike mammals, birds, or fish, the mass of large reptiles is frequently poorly documented and many are subject to conjecture and estimation.

Rank	Animal	Average mass [kg (lb)]	Maximum mass [kg (lb)]	Average total length [m (ft)]
1	Saltwater crocodile	450 (1,000)	2,000 (4,409 lbs)	4.5 (14.8)
2	Nile crocodile	410 (900)	1,090 (2,400)	4.2 (13.8)
3	Orinoco crocodile	380 (840)	1,100 (2,400)	4.1 (13.5)
4	Leatherback sea turtle	364 (800)	932 (2,050)	2.0 (6.6)
5	American crocodile	336 (740)	1,000 (2,200)	4.0 (13.1)
6	Black caiman	300 (661)	1,000 (2,200)	3.9 (12.8)
7	Gharial	250 (550)	1,000 (2,200)	4.5 (14.8)
8	American alligator	240 (530)	1,000 (2,200)	3.4 (11.2)
9	Mugger crocodile	225 (495)	700 (1,500)	3.3 (10.8)
10	False gharial	210 (460)	590 (1,300)	4.0 (13.1)
11	Aldabra giant tortoise	205 (450)	360 (790)	1.4 (4.6)
12	Loggerhead sea turtle	200 (441)	545 (1,202)	0.95 (3.2)
13	Green sea turtle	190 (418.9)	395 (870.8)	1.12 (3.67)
14	Slender-snouted crocodile	180 (400)	325 (720)	3.3 (10.8)
15	Galapagos tortoise	175 (390)	417 (919)	1.5 (4.9)

=== Dinosaurs (Dinosauria) ===
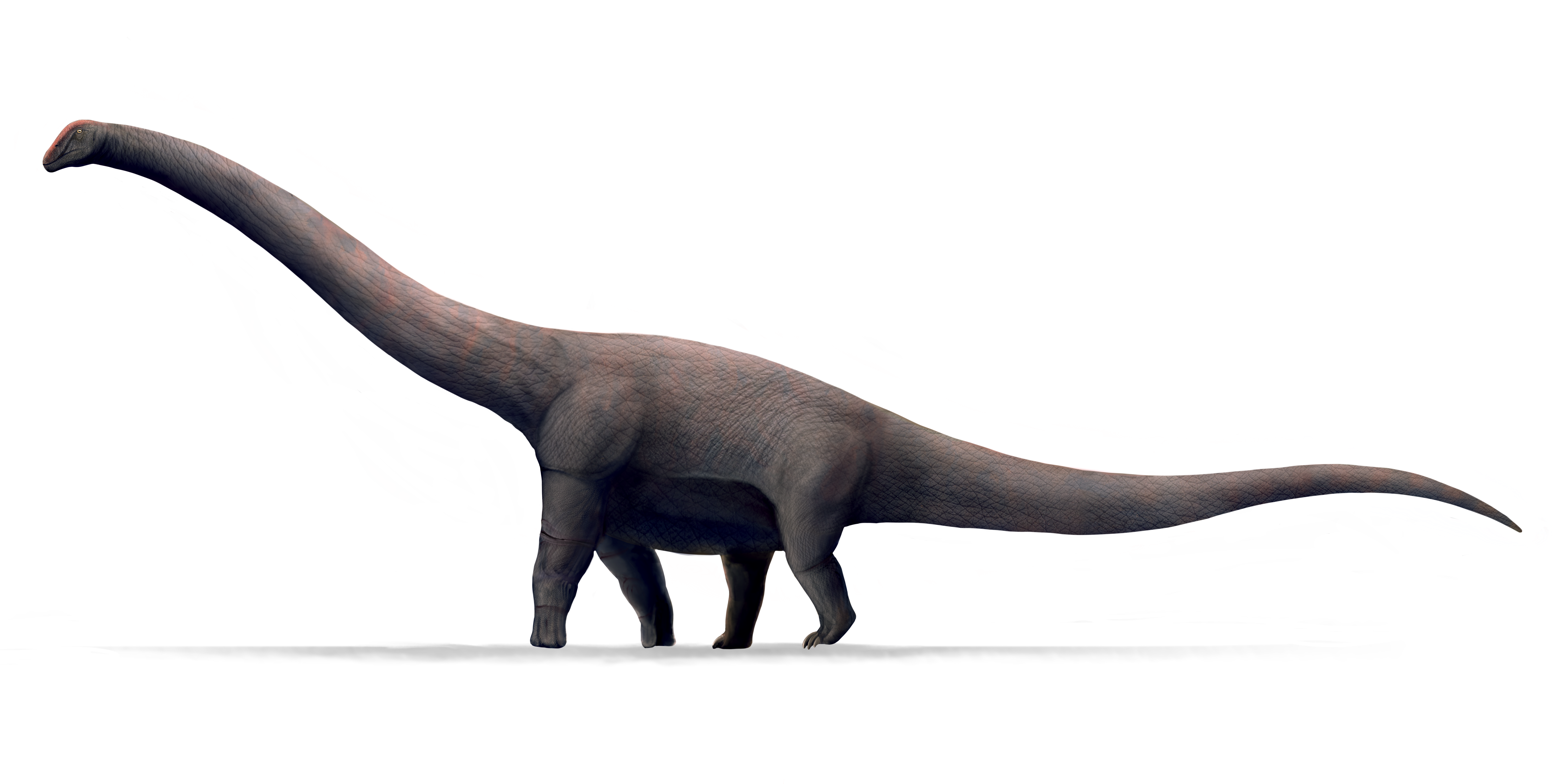
Bruhathkayosaurus matleyi, potentially the largest animal to have walked the earth

A human and the longest known dinosaurs of the five major clades. Each grid section represents one square meter. Sauropoda (Supersaurus vivianae) Ornithopoda (Shantungosaurus giganteus) Theropoda (Spinosaurus aegyptiacus) Thyreophora (Stegosaurus ungulatus) Marginocephalia (Triceratops prorsus)

Dinosaurs are now extinct, except for birds, which are a type of theropod.

==== Sauropods (Sauropoda) ====
The largest dinosaurs, and the largest animals to ever live on land, were the plant-eating, long-necked Sauropoda. The tallest and heaviest sauropod known from a complete skeleton is a specimen of an immature Giraffatitan discovered in Tanzania between 1907 and 1912, now mounted in the Museum für Naturkunde of Berlin. It is 12–13.27 m (39.4–43.5 ft) tall and weighed 23.3–39.5 tonnes. The longest is a 25 m (82 ft) long specimen of Diplodocus discovered in Wyoming, and mounted in Pittsburgh's Carnegie Natural History Museum in 1907. A Patagotitan specimen found in Argentina in 2014 is estimated to have been 37–40 m (121–131 ft) long and 20 m (66 ft) tall, with a weight of 69–77 tonnes.

There were larger sauropods, but they are known only from a few bones. The current record-holders include Argentinosaurus, which may have weighed 100 tonnes; Supersaurus which might have reached 34 m (112 ft) in length and Sauroposeidon which might have been 18 m (59 ft) tall. Some abnormal specimens such as specimen BYU 9024 of the Barosaurus/Supersaurus genus could reach an astounding 45–50 meters long, with mass varying from the 'modest' 60–66 tons to the more immense 92–120 tons. Two other such sauropods include Bruhathkayosaurus and Maraapunisaurus. Both are known only from fragments that no longer exist. Bruhathkayosaurus might have been between 40–45 m (131–148 ft) in length and 175–220 tonnes in weight according to some estimates, with recent estimates placing it between 110 and 170 tons. Maraapunisaurus might have been approximately 35–40 m long and weighed 80–120 tonnes or more. Each of these two 'super-sauropods' might have rivalled the largest blue whale in size.

==== Table of the largest sauropods ====
Rank	Animal	Estimated mass [tonnes]	Estimated total length [m (ft)]
1	Bruhathkayosaurus matleyi	110–170	44.1–45 (144.6–148)
2	Maraapunisaurus fragillimus/Amphicoelias fragilimus	80–120	35–40 (115–131)
3	Argentinosaurus huinculensis	75–80	35–39.7 (115–130)
4	Mamenchisaurus	50–80	26–35 (85–115)
5	Barosaurus lentus/Supersaurus vivianae BYU 9024	60–66	45–50 (148–160)
6	Patagotitan mayorum	55–69	33–37 (108–121)
7	Notocolossus gonzalezparejasi	44.9–75.9	28 (92)
8	Puertasaurus reuili	50–60	27–30 (89–98)
9	Sauroposeidon proteles	40–60	27–34 (89–112)
10	Dreadnoughtus schrani	22.1–59.3	26 (85)

==== Theropods (Theropoda) ====
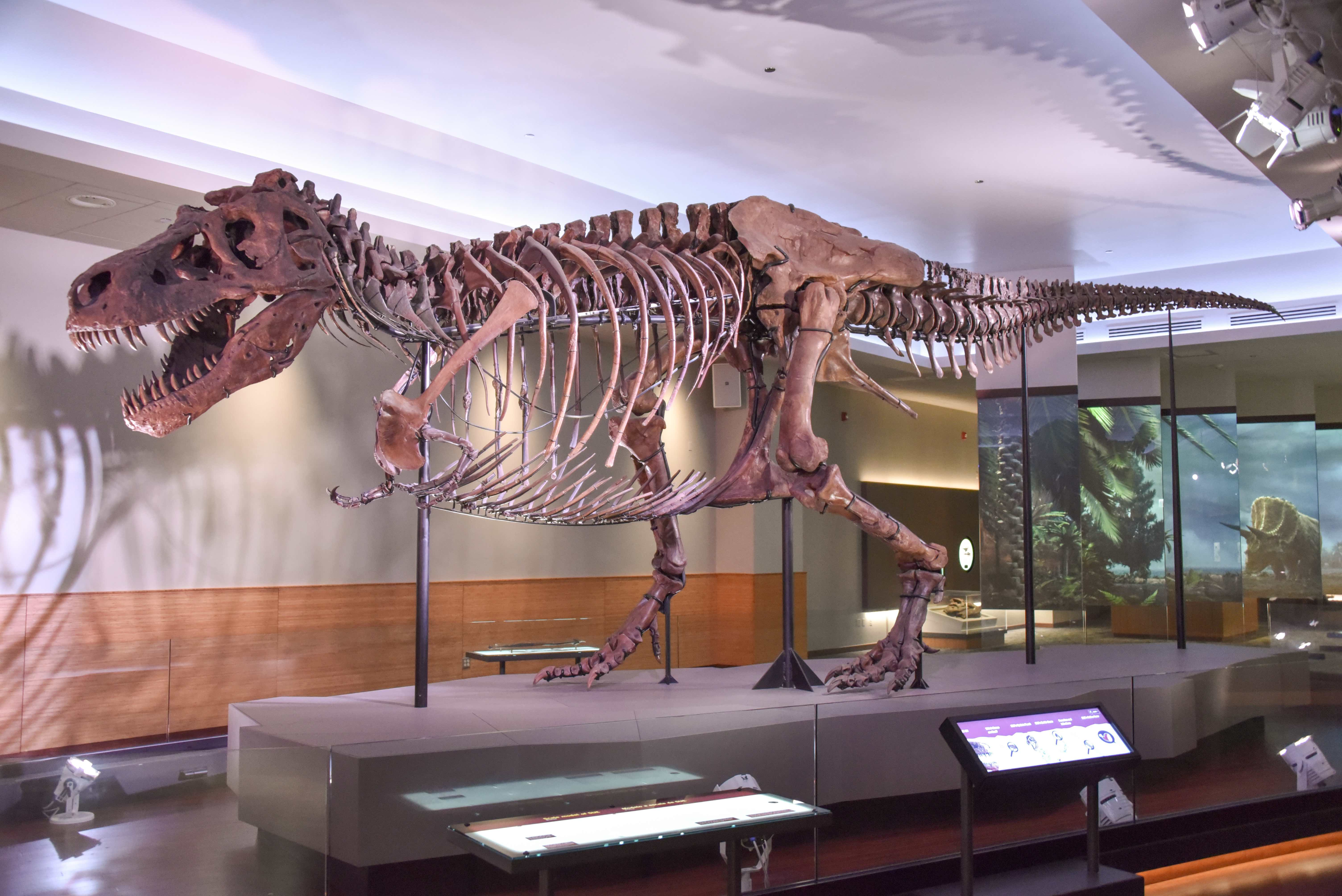
Sue, the largest near-complete Tyrannosaurus skeleton ever discovered

The largest extant theropod is the common ostrich (see birds, below).

The largest theropod known from a nearly complete skeleton is the most complete Tyrannosaurus rex specimen, nicknamed "Sue", which was discovered in South Dakota in 1990 and now mounted in the Field Museum of Chicago at a total length of 12.3–12.8 m (40–42 ft). Body mass estimates have reached over 9,500 kg, though other figures, such as Hartman's 2013 estimate of 8,400 kg, have been lower. But due to sample bias, it has been difficult to identify what the largest theropod was, thus Tyrannosaurus rex has not been given the title of the absolute largest (heaviest) theropod.

Another giant theropod is Spinosaurus aegyptiacus from the mid-Cretaceous of North Africa. Size estimates have been fluctuating far more over the years, with length estimates ranging from 12.6 to 18 m and mass estimates from 7 to 20.9 t. Recent findings favor a length exceeding 15 m and a body mass of 7.5 tons.. With the most recent study favouring a length and mass of 14 metres (46 ft) and 7.4 tonnes respectively.

Other contenders known from partial skeletons include Giganotosaurus carolinii (est. 12.2–13.2 m and 6–13.8 tonnes) and Carcharodontosaurus saharicus (est. 12–13.3 m and 6.2–15.1 tonnes).

==== Armored dinosaurs (Thyreophora) ====
The largest thyreophorans were Ankylosaurus and Stegosaurus, from the Late Cretaceous and Late Jurassic periods (respectively) of what is now North America, both measuring up to 9 m (30 ft) in length and estimated to weigh up to 6 tonnes.

==== Ornithopods (Ornithopoda) ====
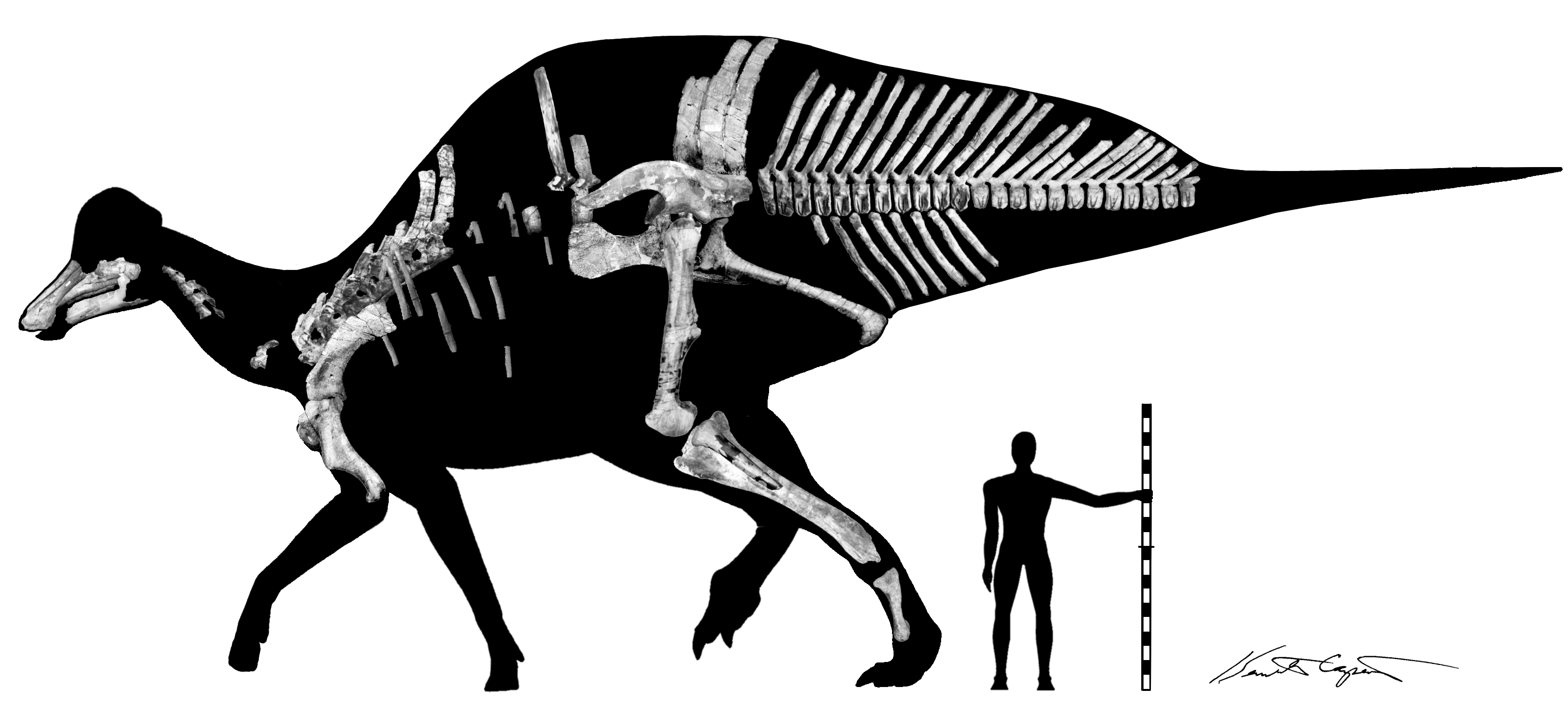
Magnapaulia, one of the largest Ornithopods and heaviest non-sauropod dinosaurs ever

The largest ornithopods were the hadrosaurids Shantungosaurus, a late Cretaceous dinosaur found in the Shandong Peninsula of China, and Magnapaulia from the late Cretaceous of North America. Both species are known from fragmentary remains but are estimated to have reached over 15 m (49 ft) in length and were likely the heaviest non-sauropod dinosaurs, estimated at over 23 tonnes. However more recent estimates for both Shantungosaurus and Magnapaulia estimated their length and body mass at 15 metres (49 ft) in length and 13 metric tons (14 short tons) in weight for Shantungosaurus and 12.5 metres (41 ft) in length and 9.77 metric tons (10.77 short tons) in weight for Magnapaulia

==== Ceratopsians (Ceratopsia) ====
The largest ceratopsians were Triceratops and its ancestor Eotriceratops from the late Cretaceous of North America. Both estimated to have reached about 9 m (30 ft) in length and weighed 12 tonnes.

==== Birds (Aves) ====
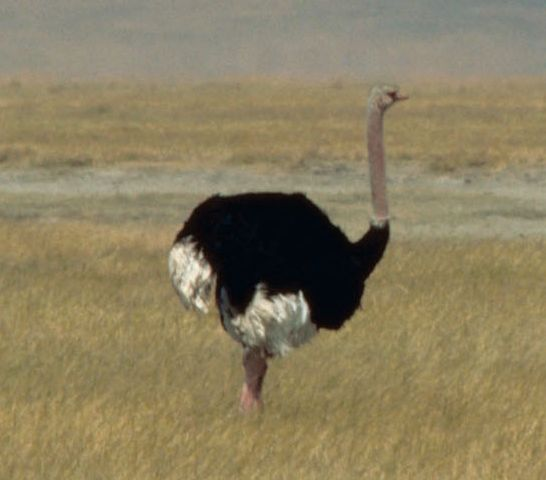
The common ostrich is the largest living bird.

The largest living bird, a member of the Struthioniformes, is the common ostrich (Struthio camelus), from the plains of Africa. A large male ostrich can reach a height of 2.8 m (9.2 ft) and weigh over 156 kg (344 lb). A mass of 200 kg (440 lb) has been cited for the common ostrich but no wild ostriches of this weight have been verified. Eggs laid by the ostrich can weigh 1.4 kg (3.1 lb) and are the largest eggs in the world today.

The largest bird in the fossil record may be the extinct elephant birds (Aepyornithidae) of Madagascar, which were related to the kiwis. Aepyornis exceeded 3 m (9.8 ft) in height and 500 kg (1,100 lb), and the largest specimens could reach a similar height and a mass of 732 kg (1,614 lb). The last of the elephant birds became extinct about 300 years ago. Of almost exactly the same upper proportions as the largest elephant birds was Dromornis stirtoni of Australia, part of a 26,000-year-old group called mihirungs of the family Dromornithidae. The largest carnivorous bird was Brontornis, an extinct flightless bird from South America which reached a weight of 350 to 400 kg (770 to 880 lb) and a height of about 2.8 m (9 ft 2 in). The tallest carnivorous bird was Kelenken, which could reach 3 to 3.2 meters in height and 220 to 250 kilograms. The tallest bird ever was the giant moa (Dinornis maximus), part of the moa family of New Zealand that went extinct around 1500 AD. This particular species of moa stood up to 3.7 m (12 ft) tall, but weighed about half as much as a large elephant bird or mihirung due to its comparatively slender frame.

The heaviest bird ever capable of flight was Argentavis magnificens, the largest member of the now extinct family Teratornithidae, found in Miocene-aged fossil beds of Argentina, with a wingspan up to 5.5 m (18 ft), a length of up to 1.25 m (4.1 ft), a height on the ground of up to 1.75 m (5.7 ft) and a body weight of at least 71 kg (157 lb). Pelagornis sandersi is thought to have had an even larger wingspan of about 6.1–7.4 m (20–24 ft), but is only about 22–40 kg (49–88 lb), half the mass of the former.

===== Heaviest living bird species =====
The following is a list of the heaviest living bird species based on maximum reported or reliable mass, but average weight is also given for comparison. These species are almost all flightless, which allows for these particular birds to have denser bones and heavier bodies. Flightless birds comprise less than 2% of all living bird species.

Rank	Animal	Binomial name	Average mass [kg (lb)]	Maximum mass [kg (lb)]	Average total length [cm (ft)]	Flighted
1	Common ostrich	Struthio camelus	104 (230)	156.8 (346)	210 (6.9)	No
2	Somali ostrich	Struthio molybdophanes	90 (200)	130 (287)	200 (6.6)	No
3	Southern cassowary	Casuarius casuarius	45 (99)	85 (190)	155 (5.1)	No
4	Northern cassowary	Casuarius unappendiculatus	44 (97)	75 (170)	149 (4.9)	No
5	Emu	Dromaius novaehollandiae	33 (73)	70 (150)	153 (5)	No
6	Emperor penguin	Aptenodytes forsteri	31.5 (69)	46 (100)	114 (3.7)	No
7	Greater rhea	Rhea americana	23 (51)	40 (88)	134 (4.4)	No
8	Domestic turkey/wild turkey	Meleagris gallopavo	13.5 (29.8)	39 (86)	100–124.9 (3.3–4.1)	Yes
9	Dwarf cassowary	Casuarius bennetti	19.7 (43)	34 (75)	105 (3.4)	No
10	Lesser rhea	Rhea pennata	19.6 (43)	28.6 (63)	96 (3.2)	No
11	Mute swan	Cygnus olor	11.87 (26.2)	23 (51)	100–130 (3.3–4.3)	Yes
12	Great bustard	Otis tarda	10.6 (23.4)	21 (46)	115 (3.8)	Yes
13	King penguin	Aptenodytes patagonicus	13.6 (30)	20 (44)	92 (3)	No
14	Kori bustard	Ardeotis kori	11.4 (25.1)	20 (44.1)	150 (5)	Yes
15	Trumpeter swan	Cygnus buccinator	11.6 (25.1)	17.2 (38)	138–165 (4.5–5.4)	Yes
16	Wandering albatross	Diomedea exulans	11.9 (24)	16.1 (38)	107–135 (3.5–4.4)	Yes
17	Whooper swan	Cygnus cygnus	11.4 (25)	15.5 (32)	140–165 (4.5–5.4)	Yes
18	Dalmatian pelican	Pelecanus crispus	11.5 (25)	15 (33.1)	183 (6)	Yes
19	Andean condor	Vultur gryphus	11.3 (25)	14.9 (33)	100–130 (3.3–4.3)	Yes

=== Amphibians (Amphibia) ===
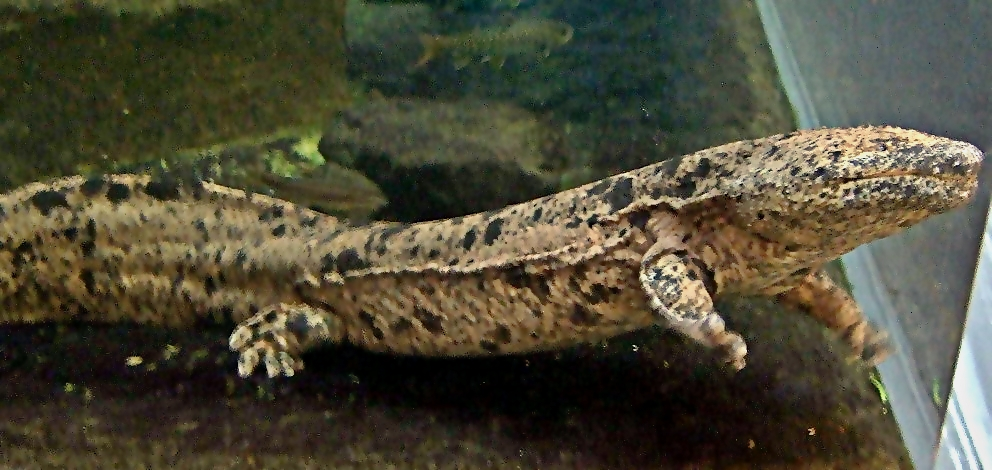
A giant salamander, the largest living amphibian.

Prionosuchus, the largest ever amphibian.

The largest living amphibian is the South China giant salamander (Andrias sligoi). Formerly considered conspecific with the Chinese giant salamander (A. davidianus), the maximum size of this nearly human-sized river-dweller is 64 kg (141 lb) and almost 1.83 m (6.0 ft). Before amniotes became the dominant tetrapods, several giant amphibian proto-tetrapods existed and were certainly the dominant animals in their ecosystems. The largest known was the crocodile-like Prionosuchus, which reached a length of 9 m (30 ft). However, due to the absence of much fossil material, these estimates may be inaccurate.

Another large amphibian is a fragmentary brachyopoid temnospondyl nicknamed the Beast of Lesotho. Using it's incomplete jaw fragment, Ross Damiani and J. Sébastien Steyer estimated a length of 7 m (23 ft).

Frogs (Anura)

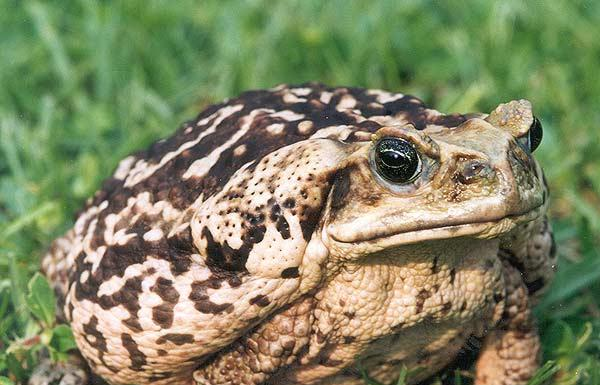
The cane toad ranks as the largest toad in the world.

The largest member of the largest order of amphibians is the African goliath frog (Conraua goliath). The maximum size this species is verified to attain is a weight of 3.8 kg (8.4 lb) and a snout-to-vent length of 39 cm (15 in). The largest of the toads is the cane toad (Rhinella marina). This infamous, often invasive species can grow to maximum mass of 2.65 kg (5.8 lb) and measure a maximum of 33 cm (13 in) from snout-to-vent. Rivaling the previous two species, the African bullfrog (Pyxicephalus adspersus) can range up to a weight of 2 kg (4.4 lb) and 25.5 cm (10.0 in) from snout to vent. Another large frog is the largest frog in North America, the American bullfrog, which can reach weights of up to 0.8 kg (1.8 lb) and snout-to-vent-length (SVL) of 20 cm (7.9 in). However, the toad Beelzebufo ampinga, found in fossil from the Cretaceous era in what is now Madagascar, was estimated to grow to 41 cm (16 in) long and weigh up to 4.5 kg (9.9 lb), making it the largest frog ever known. But in more recent studies, animals of this species have been estimated to have grown to at least 23.2 cm (9.1 in) (snout-vent length), which is around the size a modern African bullfrog can reach. The largest tree frog is the Australasian white-lipped tree frog (Litoria infrafrenata), the females of which can reach a length of 14 cm (5.5 in) from snout to vent and can weigh up to 115 g (4.1 oz). The family Leptodactylidae, one of the most diverse anuran families, also has some very large members. The largest is the Surinam horned frog (Ceratophrys cornuta), which can reach 20 cm (7.9 in) in length from snout to vent and weigh up to 0.48 kg (1.1 lb). While not quite as large as Ceratophrys cornuta, Leptodactylus pentadactylus is often heavier; it can reach 18.5 cm (7.3 in) long and weigh 0.60 kilograms (1.3 pounds). The largest dendrobatid is the Colombian golden poison frog (Phyllobates terribilis), which can attain a length of 6 cm (2.4 in) and nearly 28.3 g (1.00 oz). Most frogs are classified under the suborder Neobatrachia, although nearly 200 species are part of the suborder Mesobatrachia, or ancient frogs. The largest of these are the little-known Brachytarsophrys or Karin Hills frogs, of South Asia, which can grow to a maximum snout-to-vent length of 17 cm (6.7 in) and a maximum weight of 0.54 kg (1.2 lb).

Rank	Frog species	Maximum mass	Maximum snout-vent length	Family
1	Goliath frog	3.3 kg (7.3 lb)	35 cm (14 in)	Conrauidae
2	Helmeted water toad	3 kg (6.6 lb)	32 cm (13 in)	Calyptocephalella
3	Lake junin giant frog	2 kg (4.4 lb)	30 cm (12 in)	Telmatobiidae
4	Blyth's river frog	1.8 kg (4.0 lb)	25 cm (9.8 in)	Dicroglossidae
5	Cane toad	1.5 kg (3.3 lb)	23 cm (9.1 in)	Bufonidae
6	African bullfrog	1.4 kg (3.1 lb)	22 cm (8.7 in)	Pyxicephalidae
7	Mountain chicken frog	1 kg (2.2b)	22 cm (8.7 in)	Leptodactylidae
8	American bullfrog	0.8 kg (1.8 lb)	20 cm (7.9 in)	Ranidae
9	Surinam horned frog	0.5 kg (1.1 lb)	20 cm (7.9 in)	Ceratophryidae
10	Smokey jungle frog	0.4 kg (0.88 lb)	17 cm (6.7 in)	Leptodacylidae

==== Caecilians (Gymnophiona) ====
The largest of the worm-like caecilians is the Colombian Thompson's caecilian (Caecilia thompsoni), which reaches a length of 1.5 m (4.9 ft), a width of about 4.6 cm (1.8 in) and can weigh up to about 1 kg (2.2 lb).

==== Salamanders (Urodela) ====
Besides the previously mentioned Chinese and South China giant salamanders, the closely related Japanese giant salamander (Andrias japonicus) is also sometimes cited as the largest living amphibian, but salamanders of a greater size than 1.53 m (5.0 ft) and 36 kg (79 lb) have never been verified for this species. Another giant of the amphibian world is the North American hellbender (Cryptobranchus alleganiensis), which can measure up to 0.76 m (2.5 ft). The recently described reticulated siren of the southeastern United States rivals the hellbender in size, although it is more lean in build. The largest of the newts is the Iberian ribbed newt (Pleurodeles waltl), which can grow up to 30 cm (12 in) in length.

=== Fish ===
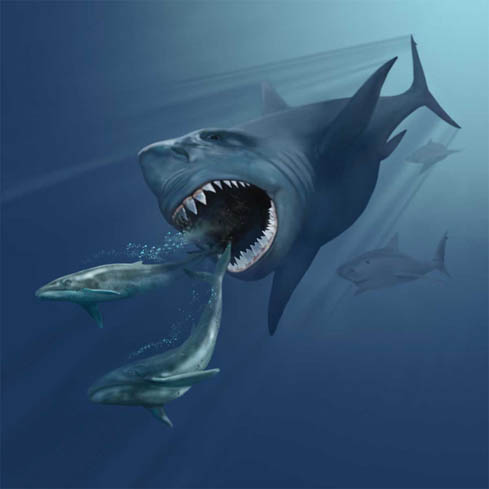
The Megalodon is the largest fish and thus shark to ever exist

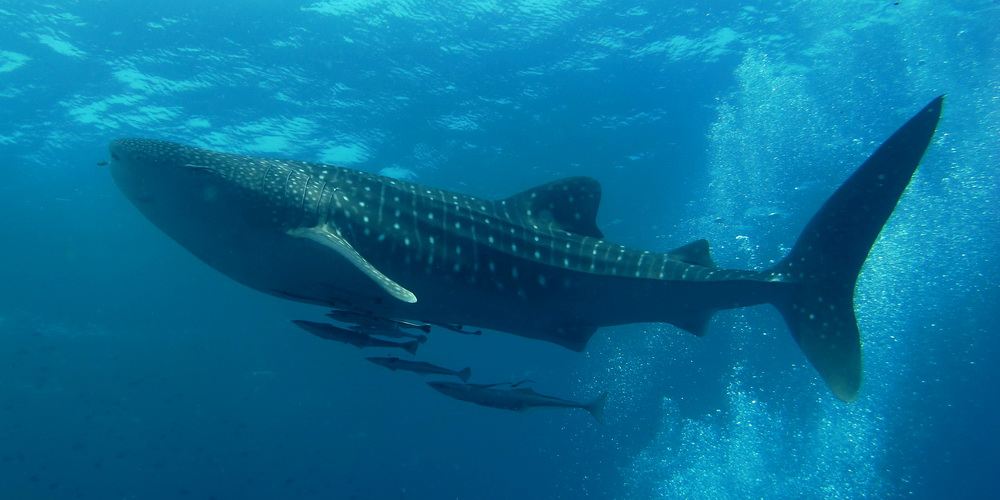
The whale shark is the largest extant fish

The largest fish of all time was likely Megalodon, estimated to have reached sizes of 14.3–24.3 metres (47–80 ft). The largest living fish, as well as the largest cartilaginous fish and largest living non-cetacean animal, is the whale shark. The largest individual had a length of 18.8 m (61.7 ft). The largest extant bony fish is the giant sunfish, with the largest recorded individual having a weight of 2,744 kg (6049 lb)

== Invertebrate chordates ==
=== Tunicates (Tunicata) ===
The largest tunicate is Synoicum pulmonaria, found at depths of 20 and 40 metres (66 and 131 ft), and are up to 14 centimetres (5.5 in) in diameter. It is also present in the northwestern Atlantic Ocean, around the coasts of Greenland and Newfoundland, but is less common here than in the east, and occurs only at depths between 10 and 13 metres (33 and 43 ft).

==== Entergonas (Enterogona) ====
The largest entergona is Synoicum pulmonaria it is usually found at depths between about 20 and 40 metres (66 and 131 ft) and can grow to over a metre (yard) in length. It is also present in the northwestern Atlantic Ocean, around the coasts of Greenland and Newfoundland, but is less common here than in the east, and occurs only at depths between 10 and 13 metres (33 and 43 ft).

==== Pleurogonas (Pleurogona) ====
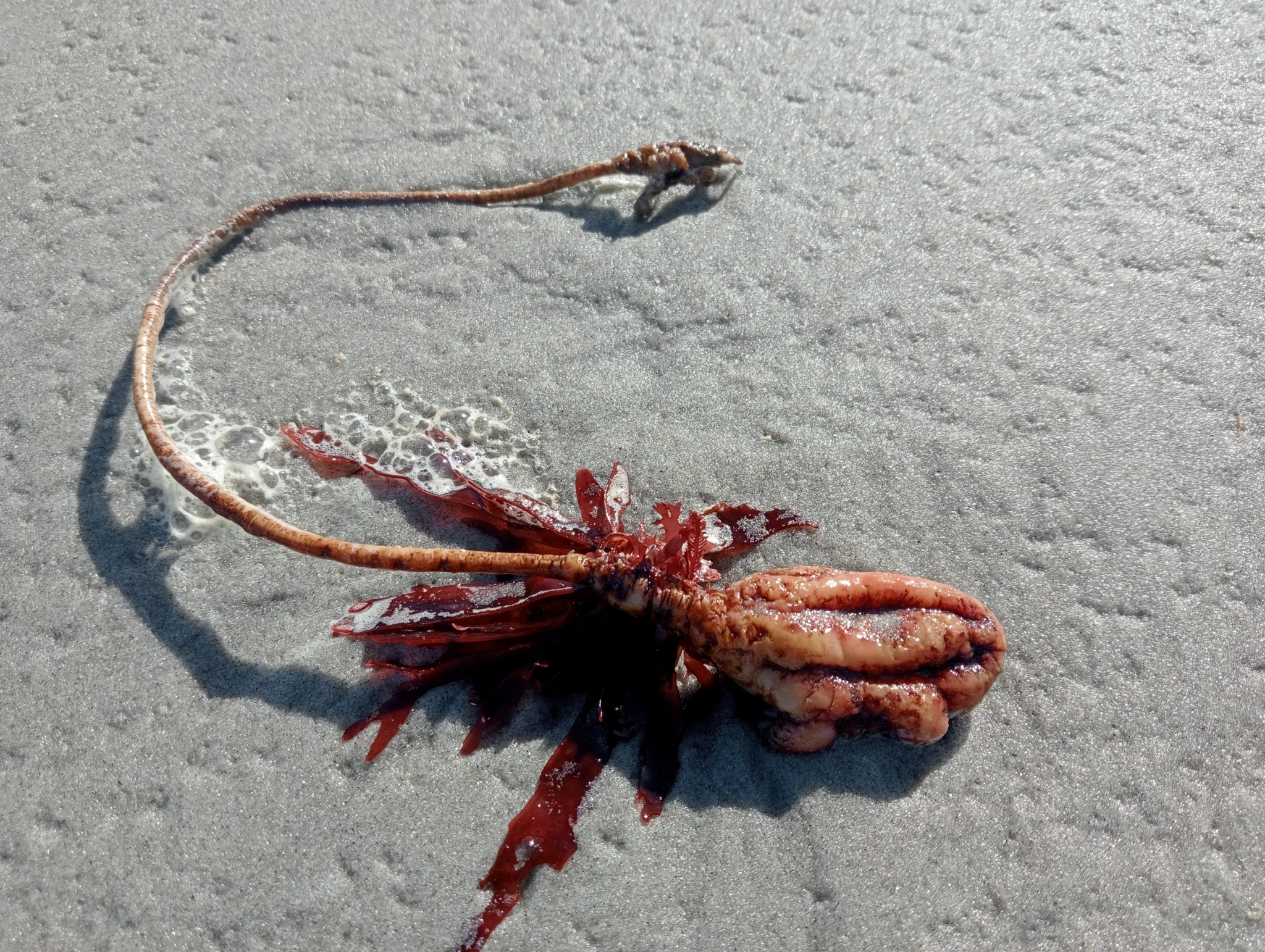
Pyura pachydermatina, the largest pleurogona

The largest pleurogona is Pyura pachydermatina. In colour it is off-white or a garish shade of reddish-purple. The stalk is two thirds to three quarters the length of the whole animal which helps distinguish it from certain invasive tunicates not native to New Zealand such as Styela clava and Pyura stolonifera. It is one of the largest species of tunicates and can grow to over a metre (yard) in length.

==== Aspiraculates (Aspiraculata) ====
The largest aspiraculate is Oligotrema large and surrounded by six large lobes; the cloacal syphon is small. They live exclusively in deep water and range in size from less than one inch (2 cm) to 2.4 inches (6 cm).

==== Thaliacea ====
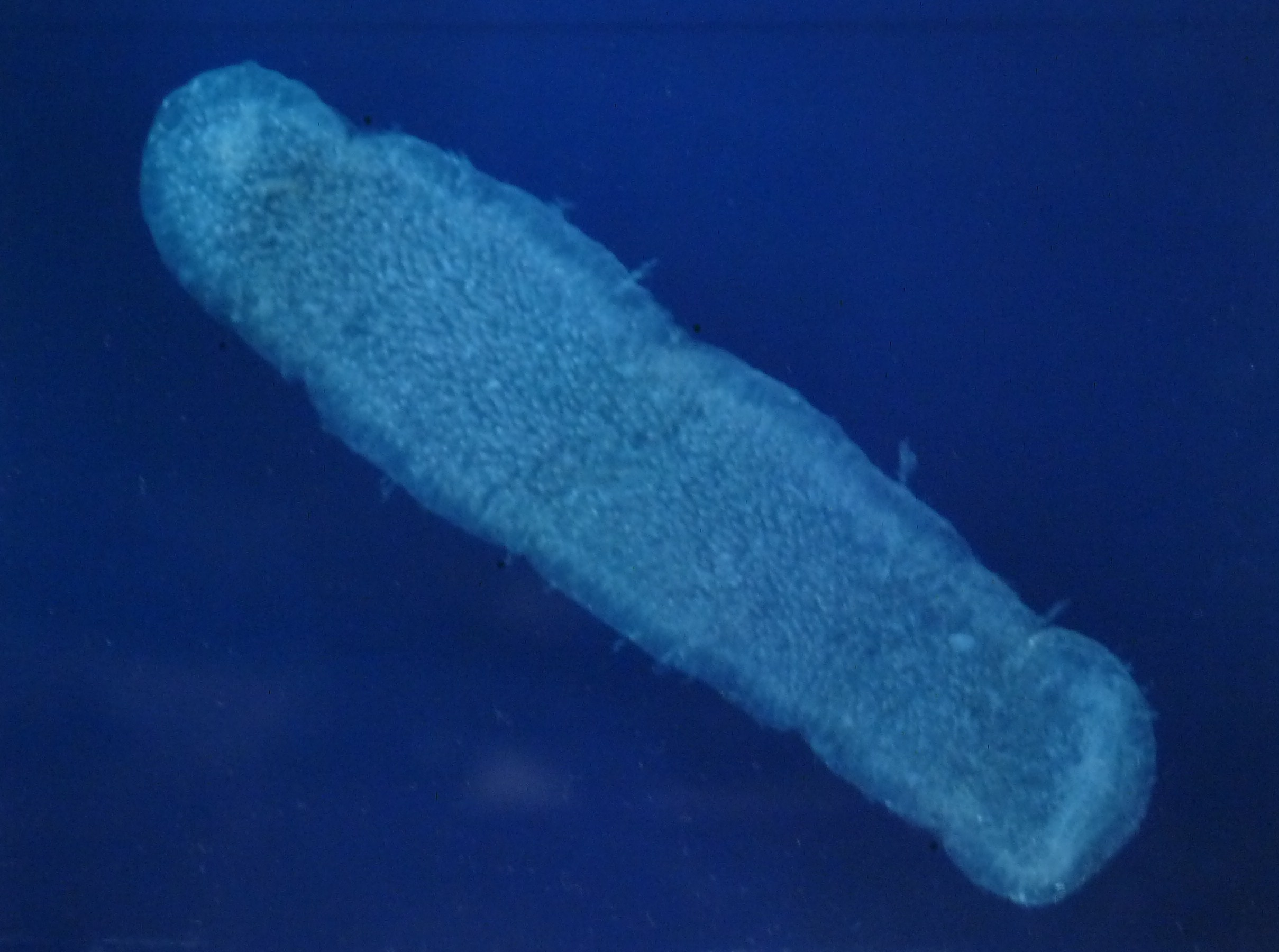
The Pyrosoma atlanticum is the largest thaliacean.

The largest thaliacean, Pyrosoma atlanticum, is cylindrical and can grow up to 60 centimetres (2.0 feet) long and 4–6 cm wide. The constituent zooids form a rigid tube, which may be pale pink, yellowish, or bluish. One end of the tube is narrower and is closed, while the other is open and has a strong diaphragm. The outer surface or test is gelatinised and dimpled with backward-pointing, blunt processes. The individual zooids are up to 8.5 mm (0.33 in) long and have a broad, rounded branchial sac with gill slits. Along the side of the branchial sac runs the endostyle, which produces mucus filters. Water is moved through the gill slits into the centre of the cylinder by cilia pulsating rhythmically. Plankton and other food particles are caught in mucus filters in the processes as the colony is propelled through the water. P. atlanticum is bioluminescent and can generate a brilliant blue-green light when stimulated.

==== Doliolida (Doliolida) ====
The largest doliolida is Doliolida The doliolid body is small, typically 1–2 cm long, and barrel-shaped; it features two wide siphons, one at the front and the other at the back end, and eight or nine circular muscle strands reminiscent of barrel bands. Like all tunicates, they are filter feeders. They are free-floating; the same forced flow of water through their bodies with which they gather plankton is used for propulsion – not unlike a tiny ramjet engine. Doliolids are capable of quick movement. They have a complicated lifecycle consisting of sexual and asexual generations. They are nearly exclusively tropical animals, although a few species are found as far north as northern California.

==== Salps (Salpida) ====
The largest salp is Cyclosalpa bakeri 15 cm (5.9 in) long. There are openings at the anterior and posterior ends of the cylinder which can be opened or closed as needed. The bodies have seven transverse bands of muscle interspersed by white, translucent patches. A stolon grows from near the endostyle (an elongated glandular structure producing mucus for trapping food particles). The stolon is a ribbon-like organ on which a batch of aggregate forms of the animal are produced by budding. The aggregate is the second, colonial form of the salp and is also gelatinous, transparent and flabby. It takes the shape of a radial whorl of individuals up to about 20 cm (7.9 in) in diameter. It is formed of approximately 12 zooids linked side by side in a shape that resembles a crown. are largest thetyses: Thetys vagina Individuals can reach up to 30 cm (12 in) long.

==== Larvaceans (Larvacea) ====
The largest larvacean is Appendicularia 1 cm (0.39 in) in body length (excluding the tail).

=== Cephalochordates (Leptocardii) ===
The largest lancelet is the European lancelet (Branchiostoma lanceolatum) "primitive fish". It can grow up to 6 cm (2.4 in) long.

== Invertebrate non-chordates ==
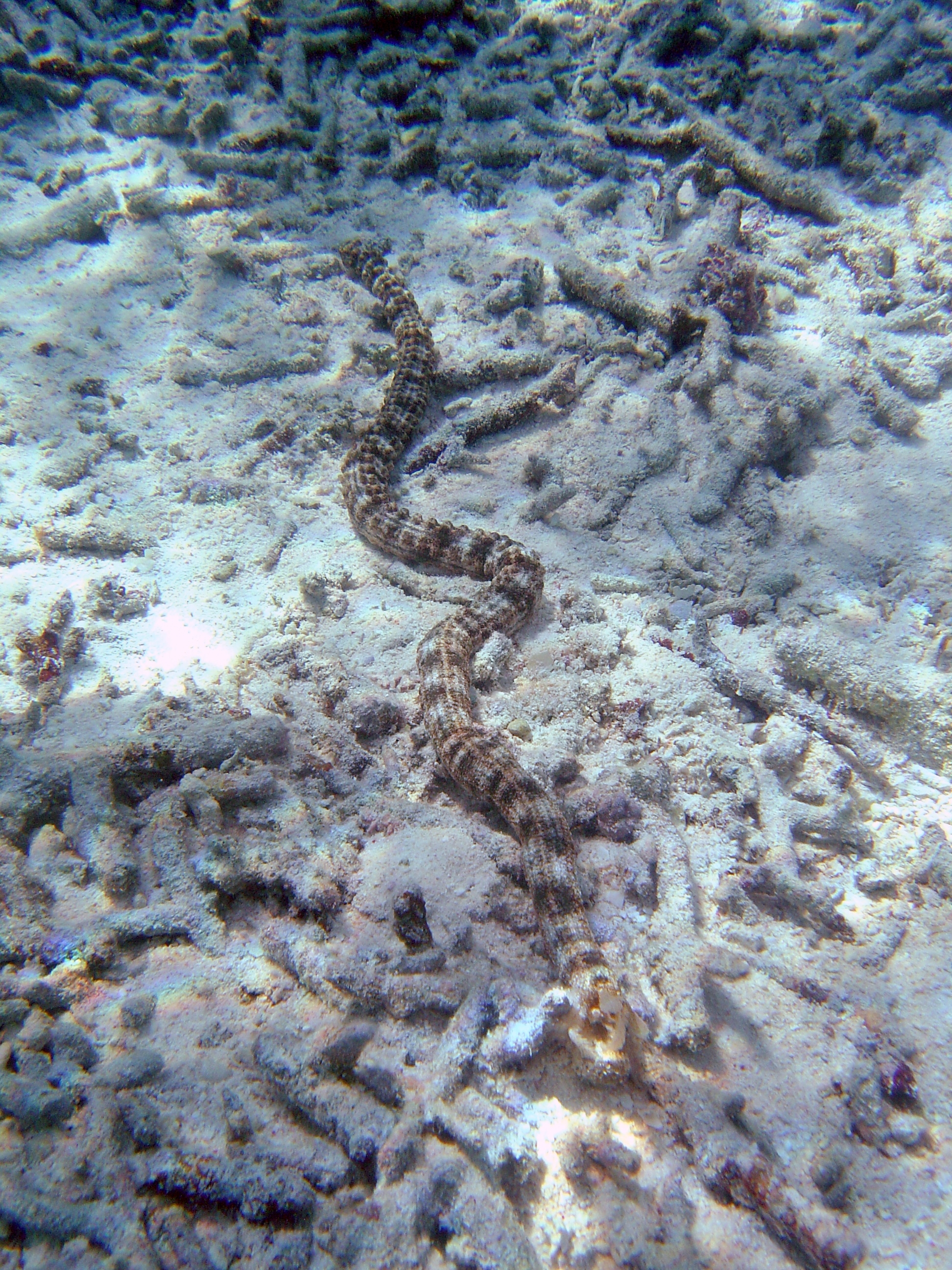
At up to 3 m (9.8 ft) long, the sea cucumber Synapta maculata is the longest known echinoderm.

=== Echinoderms (Echinodermata) ===
The largest species of echinoderm in terms of bulk is probably the starfish species Thromidia gigas, of the class Asteroidea, which reaches a weight of over 6 kg (13 lb), but it might be beaten by some giant sea cucumbers such as Thelenota anax. However, at a maximum span of 63 cm (25 in), Thromidia gigas is markedly shorter than some other echinoderms. The longest echinoderm known is the conspicuous sea cucumber Synapta maculata, with a slender body that can extend up to 3 m (9.8 ft). In comparison, the biggest sea star is the brisingid sea star Midgardia xandaros, reaching a span of 1.4 m (4.6 ft), despite being quite slender. Evasterias echinosoma is another giant echinoderm and can measure up to 1 m (3.3 ft) across and weigh 5.1 kg (11 lb).

==== Crinoids (Crinoidea) ====
The largest species of crinoid is the unstalked feather-star Heliometra glacialis, reaching a total width of 78 cm (31 in) and an individual arm length of 35 cm (14 in). A width of 91.4 cm (36.0 in) was claimed for one unstalked feather-star but is not confirmed. The genus Metacrinus has a stalk span of 61 cm (24 in) but, due to its bulk and multiple arms, it is heavier than Heliometra. In the past, crinoids grew much larger, and stalk lengths up to 40 m (130 ft) have been found in the fossil record.

==== Sea urchins and allies (Echinoidea) ====
The largest sea urchin is the species Sperosoma giganteum from the deep northwest Pacific Ocean, which can reach a shell width of about 30 cm (12 in). Another deep sea species Hygrosoma hoplacantha is only slightly smaller. The largest species found along the North America coast is the Pacific red sea urchin (Mesocentrotus franciscanus) where the shell can reach 19 cm (7.5 in). If the spines enter into count, the biggest species may be a Diadematidae like Diadema setosum, with a test up to 10 cm (3.9 in) only, but its spines can reach up to 30 cm (12 in) in length.

==== Sea cucumbers (Holothuroidea) ====
The bulkiest species of sea cucumber are Stichopus variegatus and Thelenota anax, weighing several pounds, being about 21 cm (8.3 in) in diameter, and reaching a length of 1 m (3.3 ft) when fully extended. Synapta maculata can reach an extended length of 3 m (9.8 ft), but is extremely slender (3-5cm) and weigh much less than stichopodids.

==== Brittle stars (Ophiuroidea) ====
The largest known specimen of brittle star is the basket star Astrotoma agassizii. This species can grow to have a span of 1 m (3.3 ft). Sometimes, Gorgonocephalus stimpsoni is considered the largest but the maximum this species is can measure 70 cm (28 in) and a disk diameter of about 14.3 cm (5.6 in). Outside from euryalids, the biggest ophiurid brittle star may be Ophiopsammus maculata (6–7 inches).

==== Sea stars (Asteroidea) ====
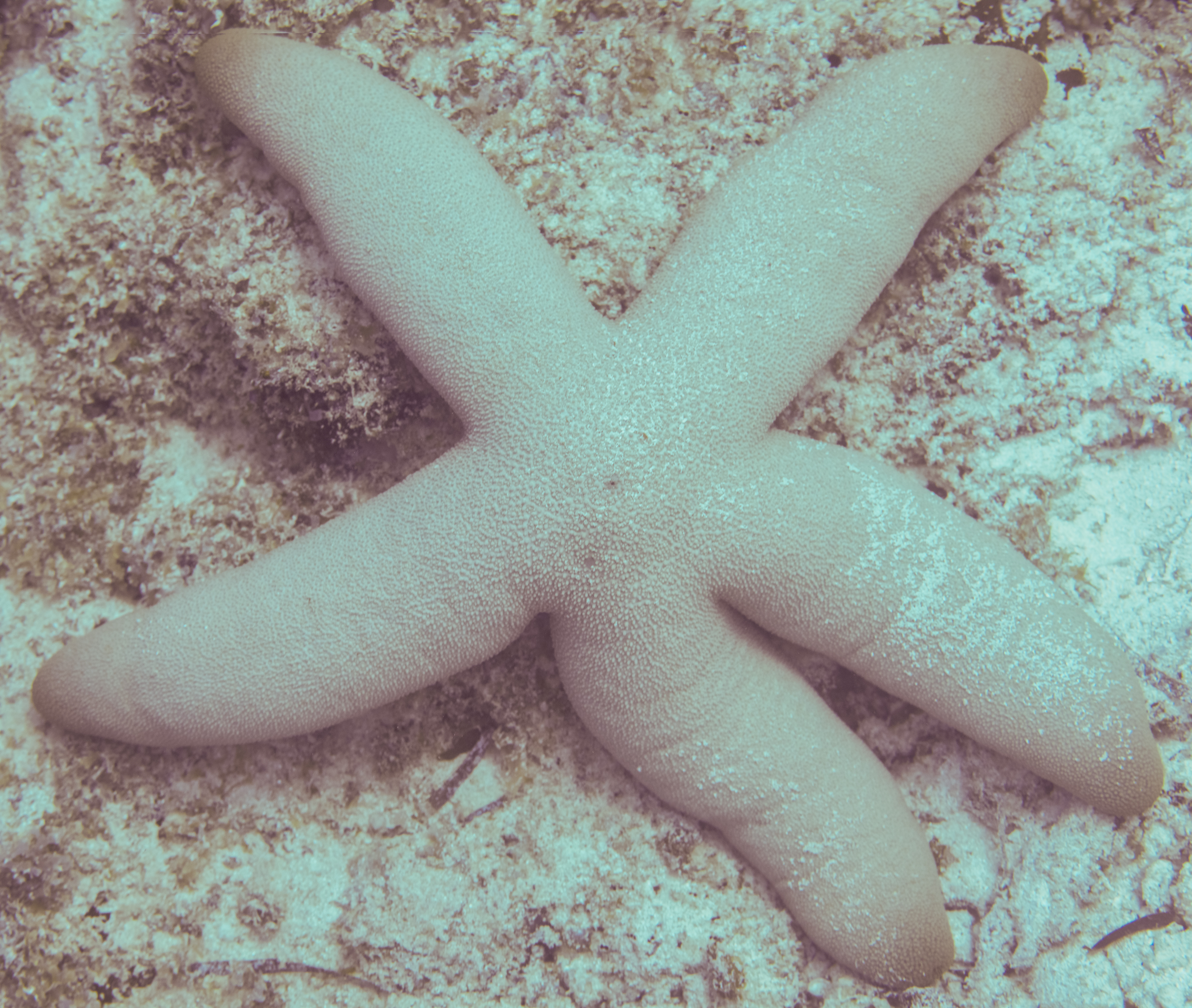
Thromidia gigas, the heaviest sea star and largest echinoderm by weight

The heaviest sea star is Thromidia gigas from the Indo-Pacific, which can surpass 6 kg (13 lb) in weight, but only has a diameter of about 65 cm (2.13 ft). Despite its relatively small disk and weight, the long slender arms of Midgardia xandaros from the Gulf of California makes it the sea star with the largest diameter at about 1.4 m (4.5 ft). Mithrodia clavigera may also become wider than 1 m (39 in) in some cases, with stout arms.

=== Flatworms (Platyhelminthes) ===
==== Monogenean flatworms (Monogenea) ====
The largest known members of this group of very small parasites are among the genus of capsalids, Listrocephalos, reaching a length of 2 cm (0.79 in).

==== Flukes (Trematoda) ====
The largest known species of fluke is Fasciolopsis buski, which most often attacks humans and livestock. One of these flukes can be up to 7.5 cm (3.0 in) long and 2 cm (0.79 in) thick.

==== Tapeworms (Cestoda) ====
The largest known species of tapeworm is the whale tapeworm, Polygonoporus giganticus, which can grow to over 30 m (98 ft).

=== Arrow Worms (Chaetognatha) ===
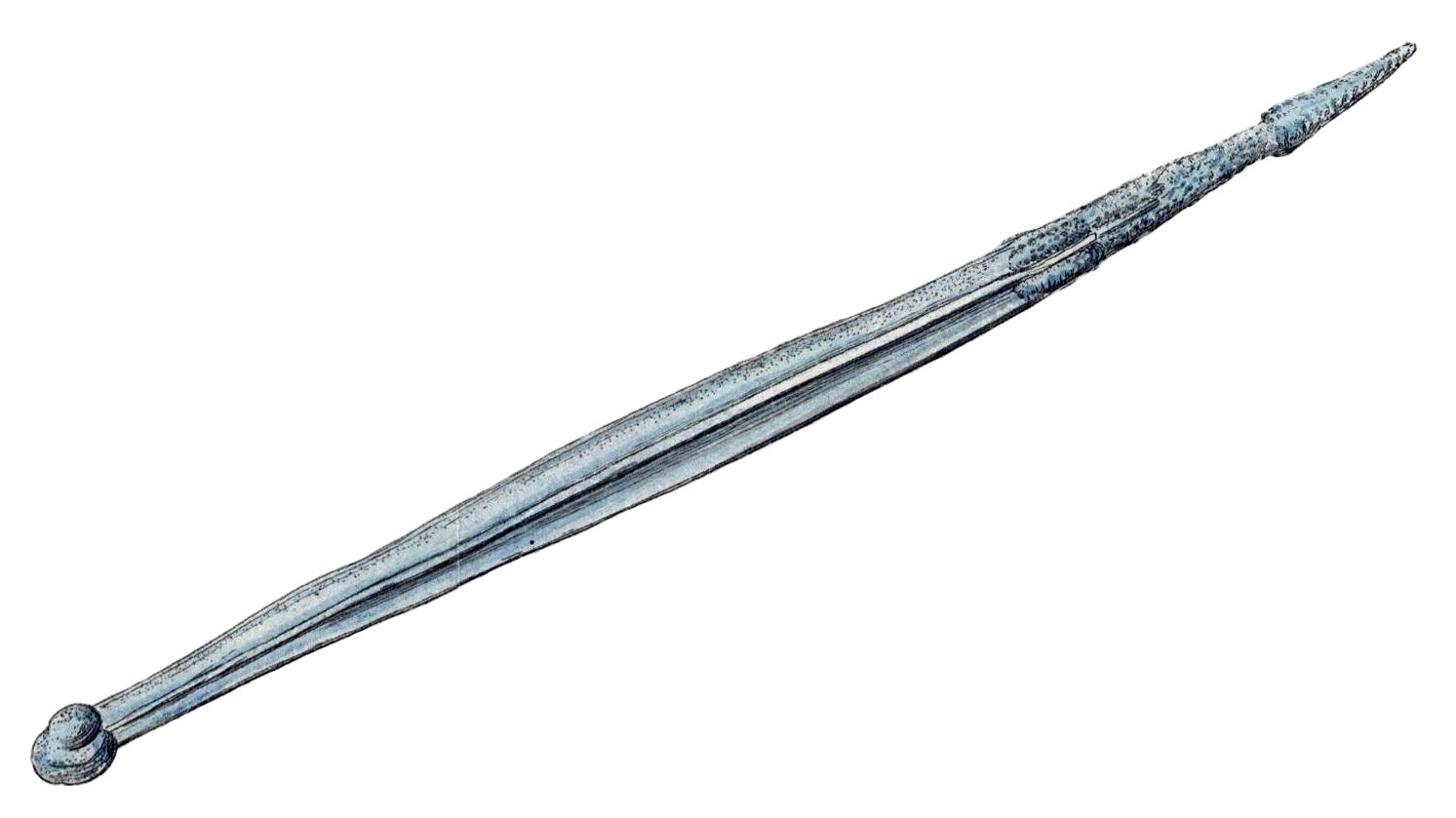
Parasagitta setosa, the longest arrow worm

The largest arrow worm is Parasagitta setosa, which grows to a maximum length of 14 mm (0.55 in), its tail being up to a quarter of this length.

=== Segmented worms (Annelida) ===
The largest of the segmented worms (including earthworms, leeches, and polychaetes) is the African giant earthworm (Microchaetus rappi). Although it averages about 1.36 m (4.5 ft) in length, this huge worm can reach a length of as much as 6.7 m (22 ft) and can weigh over 1.5 kg (3.3 lb). Only the giant Gippsland earthworm, Megascolides australis, and a few giant polychaetes, including the notorious Eunice aphroditois, reach nearly comparable sizes, reaching 4 and 3.6 m (13 and 12 ft), respectively.

=== Ribbon worms (Nemertea) ===
The largest nemertean is the bootlace worm, Lineus longissimus. A specimen found washed ashore on a beach in St. Andrews, Scotland in 1864 was recorded at a length of 55 m (180 ft).

=== Mollusks (Mollusca) ===
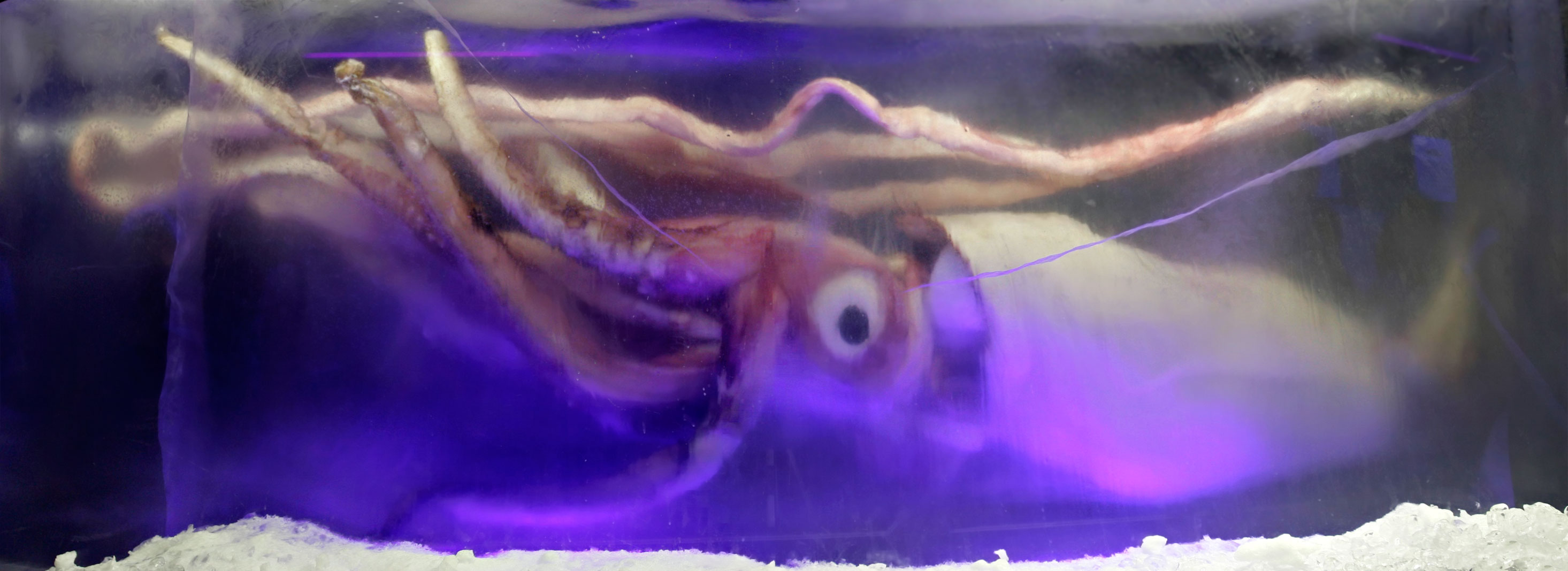
A 7 m (23 ft) giant squid, the second largest of all invertebrates, encased in ice in the Melbourne Aquarium.

Both the largest mollusks and the largest of all invertebrates (in terms of mass) are the largest squids. The colossal squid (Mesonychoteuthis hamiltoni) is projected to be the largest invertebrate. Current estimates put its maximum size at 12 to 14 m (39 to 46 ft) long and 750 kg (1,650 lb), based on analysis of smaller specimens. In 2007, authorities in New Zealand announced the capture of the largest known colossal squid specimen. It was initially thought to be 10 m (33 ft) and 450 kg (990 lb). It was later measured at 4.2 m (14 ft) long and 495 kg (1,091 lb) in weight. The mantle was 2.5 m (8.2 ft) long when measured.

The giant squid (Architeuthis dux) was previously thought to be the largest squid, and while it is less massive and has a smaller mantle than the colossal squid, it may exceed the colossal squid in overall length including tentacles. One giant squid specimen that washed ashore in 1878 in Newfoundland reportedly measured 16.8 m (55 ft) in total length (from the tip of the mantle to the end of the long tentacles), head and body length 6.1 m (20 ft), 4.6 m (15 ft) in circumference at the thickest part of mantle, and weighed about 900 kg (2,000 lb). This specimen is still often cited as the largest invertebrate that has ever been examined. However, no animals approaching this size have been scientifically documented and, according to giant squid expert Steve O'Shea, such lengths were likely achieved by greatly stretching the two tentacles like elastic bands.

Another large mollusk is Nanaimoteuthis haggarti, a large, extinct cirrate octopus only known from a large beak fragment. Its length estimates, although highly speculative, lie between 6.6 and 18.6 m (22 and 61 ft).

==== Aplacophorans (Aplacophora) ====
The largest known of these worm-like, shell-less mollusks are represented in the genus Epimenia, which can reach 30 cm (12 in) long. Most aplacophorans are less than 5 cm (2.0 in) long.

==== Chitons (Polyplacophora) ====
The largest of the chitons is the gumboot chiton, Cryptochiton stelleri, which can reach a length of 33 cm (13 in) and weigh over 2 kg (4.4 lb).

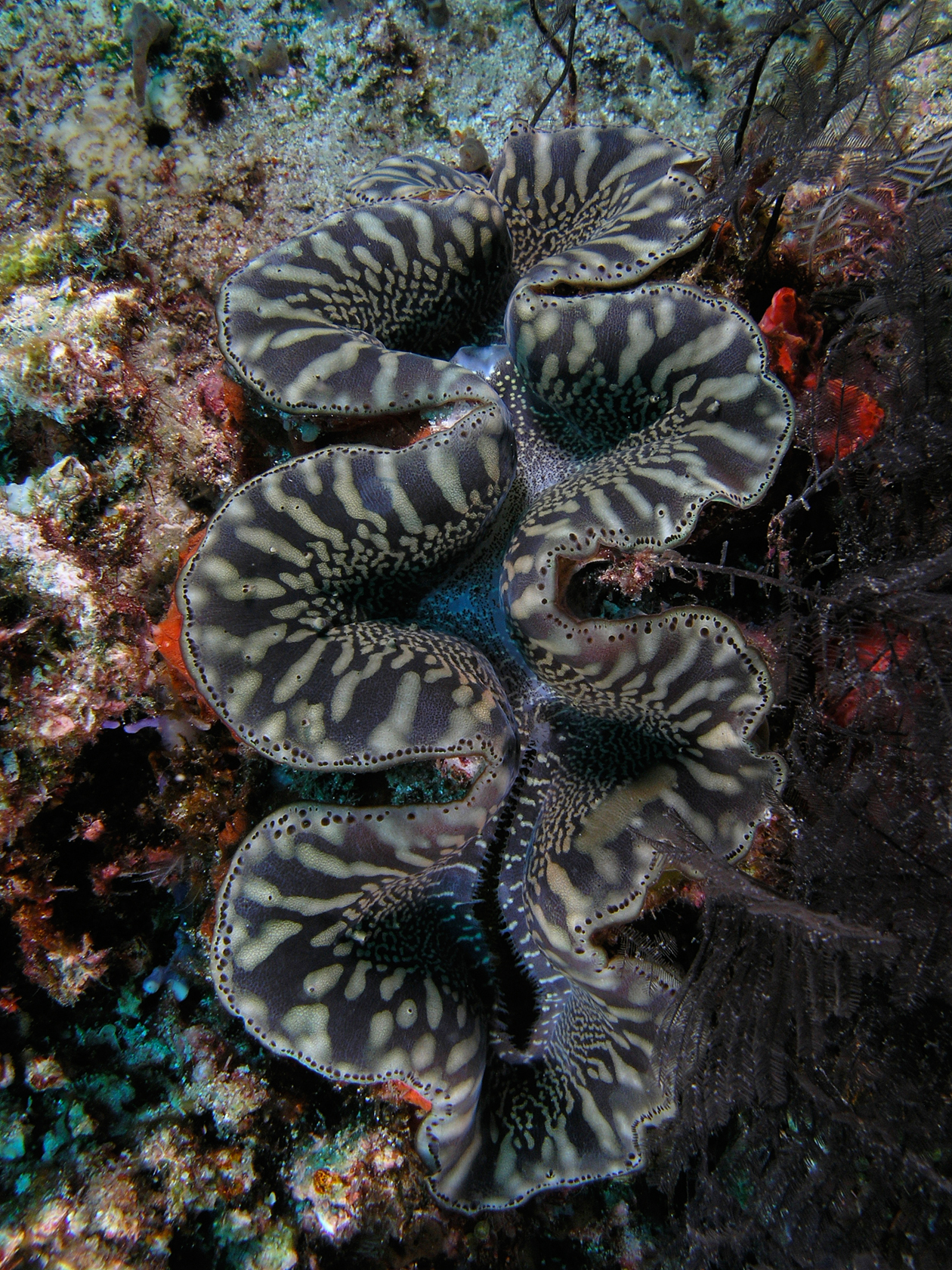
The mouth of a mostly hidden giant clam, the largest bivalve

==== Bivalves (Bivalvia) ====
The largest of the bivalve mollusks is the giant clam, Tridacna gigas. Although even larger sizes have been reported for this passive animal, the top verified size was for a specimen from the Great Barrier Reef. This creature weighed 270 kg (600 lb), had an axial length of 1.14 m (3.7 ft) and depth of 0.75 m (2.5 ft). The largest bivalve ever was Platyceramus platinus, a Cretaceous giant that reached an axial length of up to 3 m (nearly 10 ft).

==== Gastropods (Gastropoda) ====
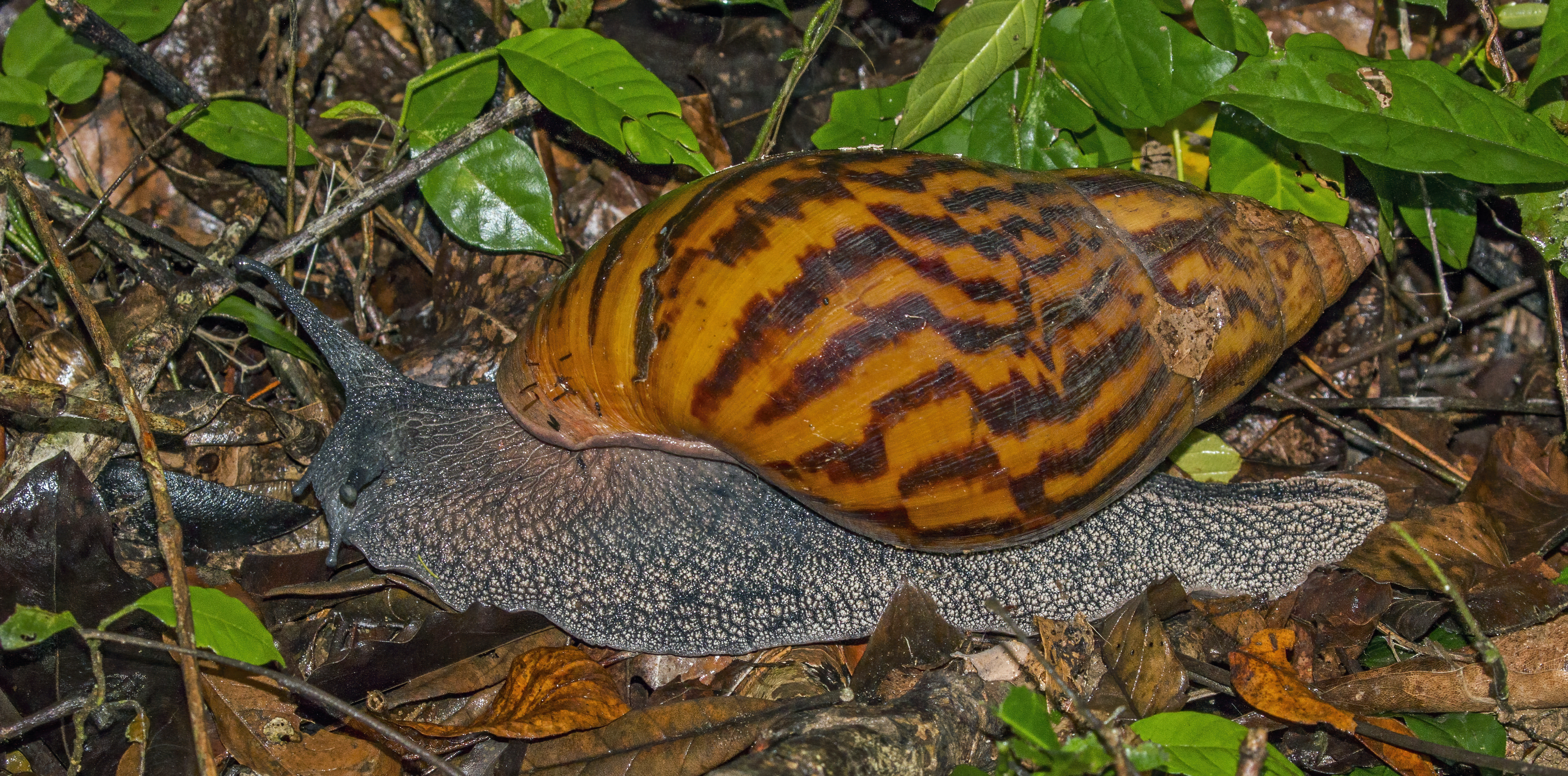
Achatina achatina is the largest land snail

The "largest" of this most diverse and successful mollusk class of slugs and snails can be defined in various ways.

The living gastropod species that has the largest (longest) shell is Syrinx aruanus with a maximum shell length of 0.91 m (3.0 ft), a weight of 18 kg (40 lb) and a width of 96 cm (38 in). Another giant species is Melo amphora, which in a 1974 specimen from Western Australia, measured 0.71 m (2.3 ft) long, had a maximum girth of 0.97 m (3.2 ft) and weighed 16 kg (35 lb).

The largest shell-less gastropod is the giant black sea hare (Aplysia vaccaria) at 0.99 m (3.2 ft) in length and almost 14 kg (31 lb) in weight.

The largest of the land snails is the giant African snail (Achatina achatina) at up to 1 kg (2.2 lb) and 35 cm (14 in) long.

==== Cephalopods (Cephalopoda) ====
While generally much smaller than the giant Architeuthis and Mesonychoteuthis, the largest of the octopuses, the giant Pacific octopus (Enteroctopus dofleini), can grow to be very large. The largest confirmed weight of a giant octopus is 74 kg (163 lb), with a 7 m (23 ft) arm span (with the tentacles fully extended) and a head-to-tentacle-tip length of 3.9 m (13 ft). Specimens have been reported up to 125 kg (276 lb) but are unverified. A weight of 10–50kg is a much more common size.

==== Tusk Shell (Scaphopoda) ====
The largest tusk shell Fissidentalium metivieri class range in length 0.5–18 cm (0.20–7.09 in)

=== Roundworms (Nematoda) ===
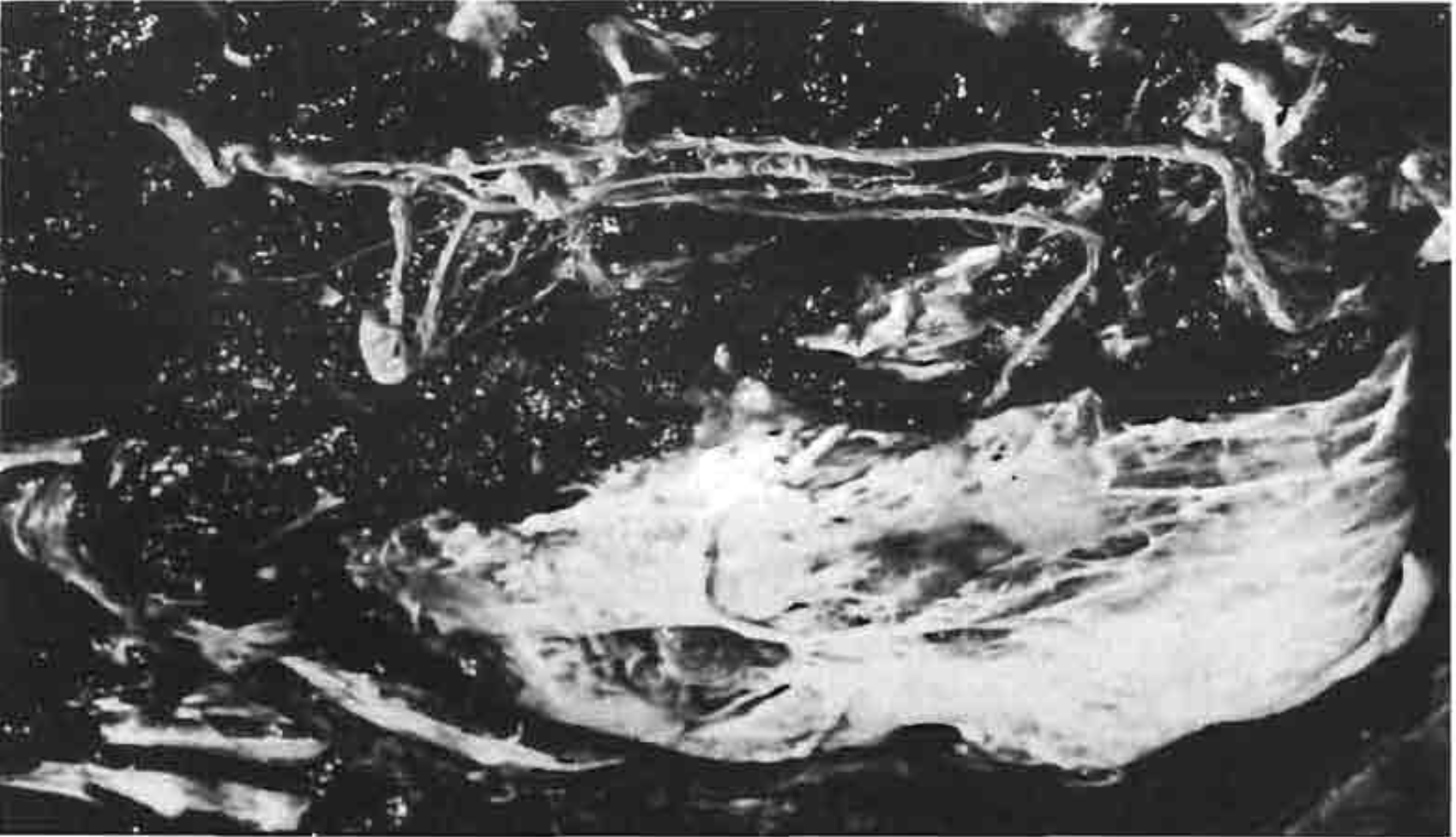
Placentonema gigantissima, the largest roundworm

The largest roundworm, Placentonema gigantissima, is a parasite found in the placentas of sperm whales which can reach up to 9 m (30 ft) in length.

=== Velvet worms (Onychophora) ===
The largest velvet worm known is Solórzano's velvet worm (Peripatus solorzanoi). An adult female was recorded to have a body length of 22 cm (approximately 8.7 in).

=== Water bears (Tardigrada) ===
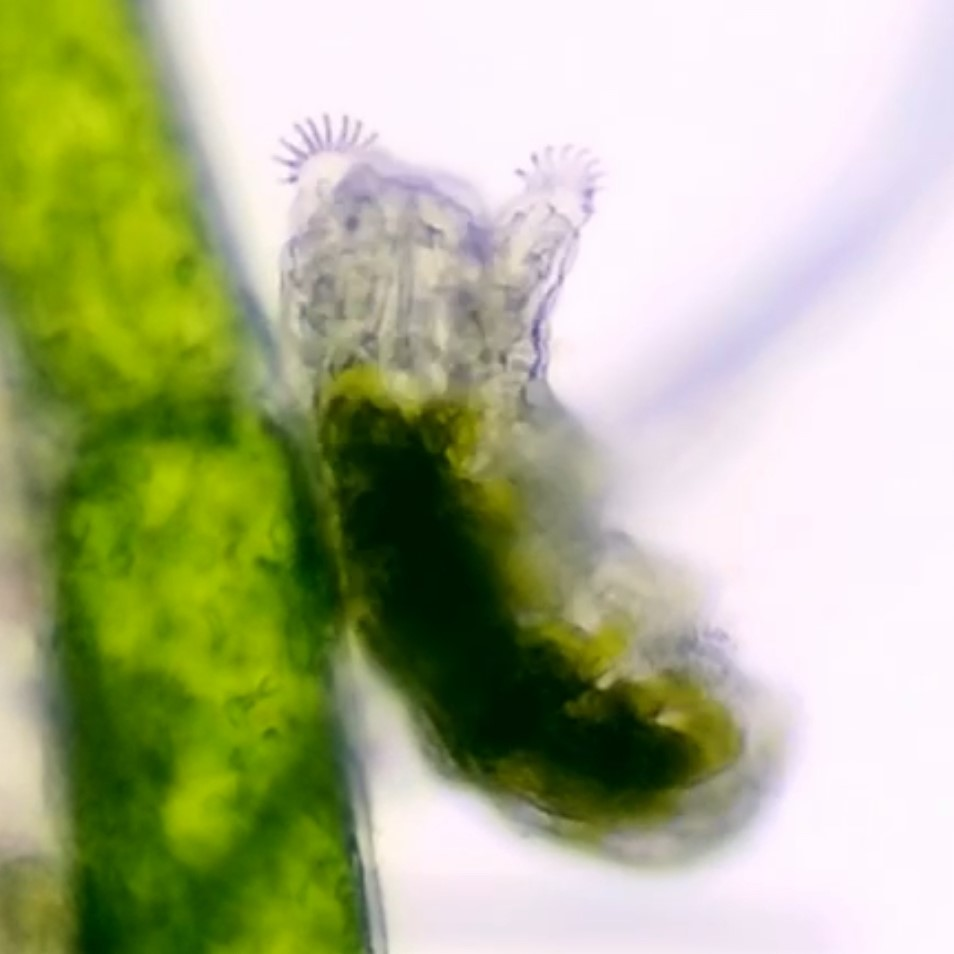
Echiniscoides sigismundi, the largest water bear

The largest tardigrade is Echiniscoides sigismundi, which is less than 2 mm (0.079 in) long. Typical tardigrades are about 0.5 mm (0.020 in) long. Only the larger tardigrades are visible to the naked eye, but magnification is needed to see them as they are transparent.

=== Arthropods (Arthropoda) ===
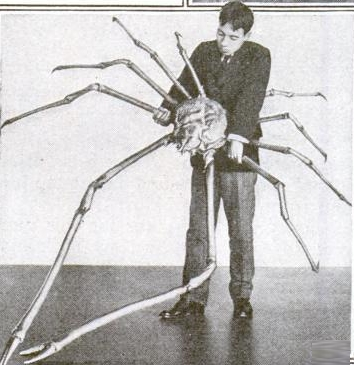
Japanese spider crab.

The largest arthropod known to have existed is the eurypterid (sea scorpion) Jaekelopterus, reaching up to 2.5 m (8.2 ft) in body length, followed by the millipede relative Arthropleura at around 2.1 m (6.9 ft) in length.

Among living arthropods, the Japanese spider crab (Macrocheira kaempferi) is the largest in overall size, the record specimen, caught in 1921, had an extended arm span of 3.8 m (12 ft) and weighed about 19 kg (42 lb). The heaviest is the American lobster (Homarus americanus), the largest verified specimen, caught in 1977 off of Nova Scotia weighed 20 kg (44 lb) and its body length was 1.1 m (3.6 ft). The largest land arthropod and the largest land invertebrate is the coconut crab (Birgus latro), up to 40 cm (1.3 ft) long and weighing up to 4 kg (8.8 lb) on average. Its legs may span 1 m (3.3 ft).

==== Arachnids (Arachnida) ====
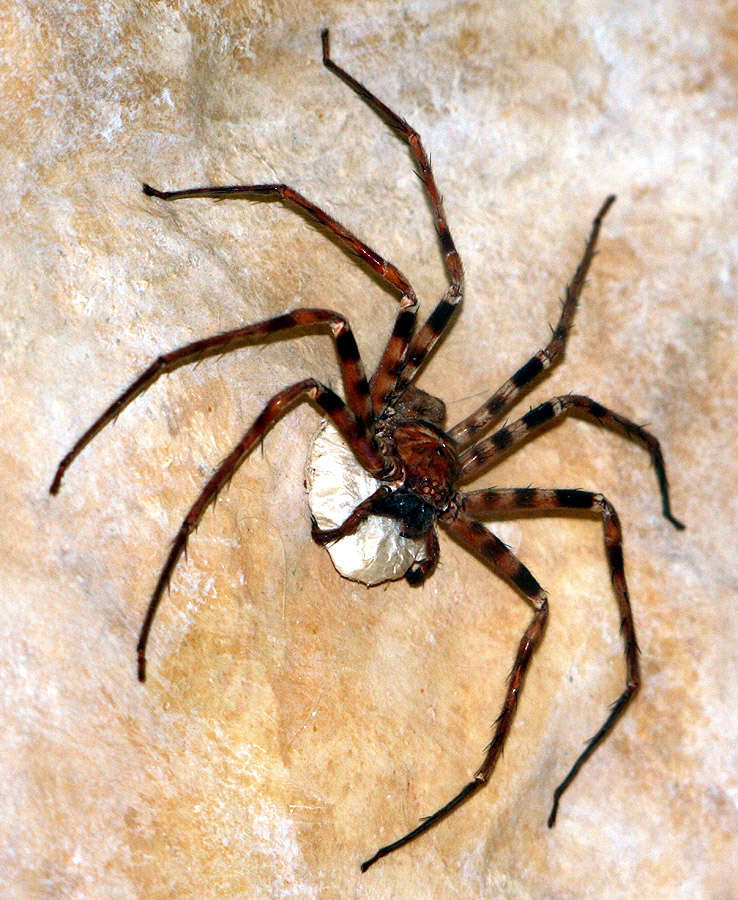
Giant huntsman spider

===== Spiders (Araneae) =====
The largest species of arachnid by length is probably the giant huntsman spider (Heteropoda maxima) of Laos, which in 2008 replaced the Goliath birdeater (Theraphosa blondi) of northern South America as the largest known spider by leg-span. However the most massive arachnids, of comparable dimensions and possibly even greater mass, are the Chaco golden knee (Grammostola pulchripes), and the Brazilian salmon pink (Lasiodora parahybana). The huntsman spider may span up to 29 cm (11 in) across the legs, while in the New World tarantulas like Theraphosa can range up to 26 cm (10 in). In Grammostola, Theraphosa and Lasiodora, the weight is projected to be up to at least 150 g (5.3 oz) and body length is up to 10 cm (3.9 in).

===== Scorpions (Scorpiones) =====
The largest of the scorpions is the species Heterometrus swammerdami of the Indian subcontinent, which have a maximum length of 29.2 cm (11.5 in) and weigh around 60 g (2.1 oz). Another extremely large scorpion is the African emperor scorpion (Pandinus imperator), which can weigh 57 g (2.0 oz) but is not known to exceed a length of 23 cm (9.1 in). However, they were dwarfed by Pulmonoscorpius kirktonensis, a giant extinct species of scorpion from Scotland, at an estimated length of 0.7 m (2.3 ft), and the aquatic Brontoscorpio, at up to 94 cm (3.08 ft) which is only known from a free finger.

===== Pseudoscorpions (Pseudoscorpiones) =====
The largest pseudoscorpion is Garypus titanius, from Ascension island, which can be 12 mm (0.47 in) long.

==== Thecostracans (Thecostraca) ====
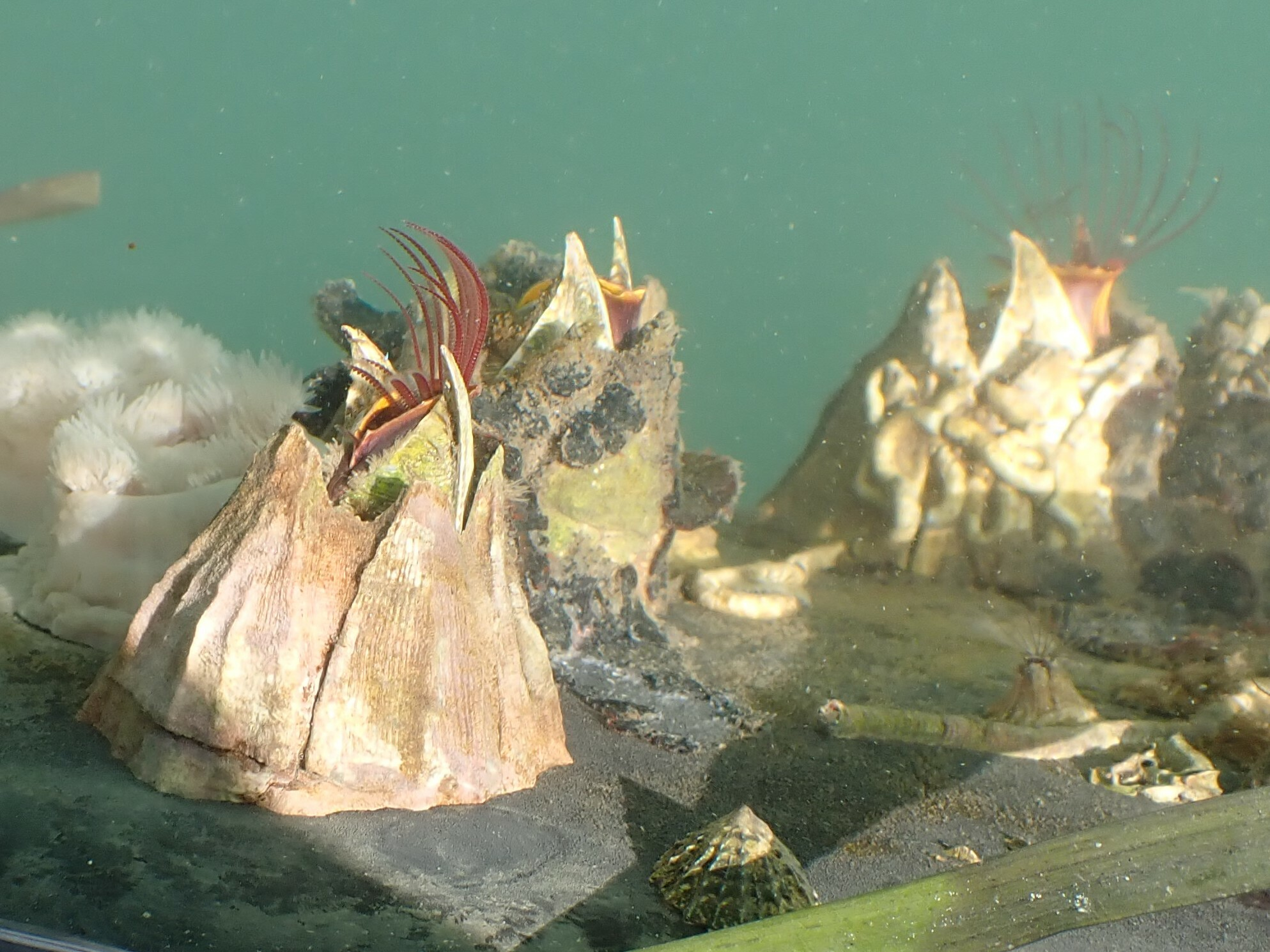
Giant acorn barnacle

The largest known thecostracan Facetotecta y-larvae are Hansenocaris cristalabri, about 0.5 millimeters long.

==== Barnacles and allies (Cirripedia) ====
The largest barnacle is Balanus nubilus, reaching a diameter of 15 cm (6 in) and a height of up to 30 cm (12 in), and containing the largest known muscle fibres.

==== Crustaceans (Crustacea) ====
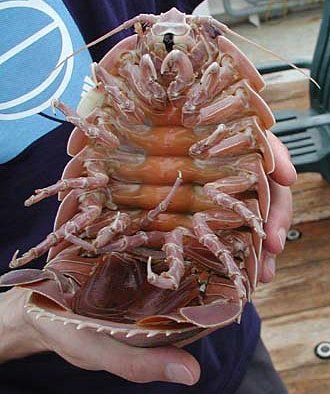
Giant isopod (see below)

The largest crustacean is the Tasmanian giant crab (Pseudocarcinus gigas), with a weight of 13 kilograms (29 lb) and a carapace width of up to 46 centimetres (18 in). It is the only species in the genus Pseudocarcinus. Males reach more than twice the size of females. At a length of up to 40 centimetres (16 in), Lysiosquillina maculata is the largest mantis shrimp in the world. Tasmanian giant freshwater crayfish (Astacopsis gouldi) 5 kilograms (11 lb) in weight and over 80 centimetres (31 in) long have been known in the past, but now, even individuals over 2 kilograms (4.4 lb) are rare. The species is only found in Tasmanian rivers flowing north into the Bass Strait below 400 metres (1,300 ft) above sea level, and is listed as an endangered species on the IUCN Red List.

===== Branchiopods (Branchiopoda) =====
The largest of these primarily freshwater crustaceans is probably Branchinecta gigas, which can reach a length 10 cm (3.9 in).

===== Barnacles and allies (Maxillopoda) =====
The largest species is Pennella balaenopterae, a copepod and ectoparasite specialising in parasitising marine mammals. The maximum size attained is 32 cm (about 13 in). The largest of the barnacles is the giant acorn barnacle, Balanus nubilis, reaching 7 cm (2.8 in) in diameter and 12.7 cm (5.0 in) high.

===== Ostracods (Ostracoda) =====
The largest living representative of these small and little-known but numerous crustaceans is the species Gigantocypris australis females of which reaching a maximum length of 3 cm (1.2 in).

===== Amphipods, isopods, and allies (Peracarida) =====
The largest species is the giant isopod (Bathynomus pergiganteus), which can reach a length of 45 cm (18 inches) and a weight of 1.7 kg (3.7 lb).

===== Remipedes (Remipedia) =====
The largest of these cave-dwelling crustaceans is the species Godzillius robustus, at up to 4.5 cm (1.8 in).

==== Horseshoe crabs (Xiphosura) ====
The four modern horseshoe crabs are of roughly the same sizes, with females measuring up to 60 cm (2.0 ft) in length and 5 kg (11 lb) in weight.

==== Sea spiders (Pycnogonida) ====
The largest of the sea spiders is the deep-sea species Colossendeis colossea, attaining a leg span of nearly 60 cm (2.0 ft).

==== Trilobites (Trilobita) ====
Some of these extinct marine arthropods exceeded 60 cm (24 in) in length. A nearly complete specimen of Isotelus rex from Manitoba attained a length over 70 cm (28 in), and an Ogyginus forteyi from Portugal was almost as long. Fragments of trilobites suggest even larger record sizes. An isolated pygidium of Hungioides bohemicus implies that the full animal was 90 cm (35 in) long.

==== Myriapods (Myriapoda) ====
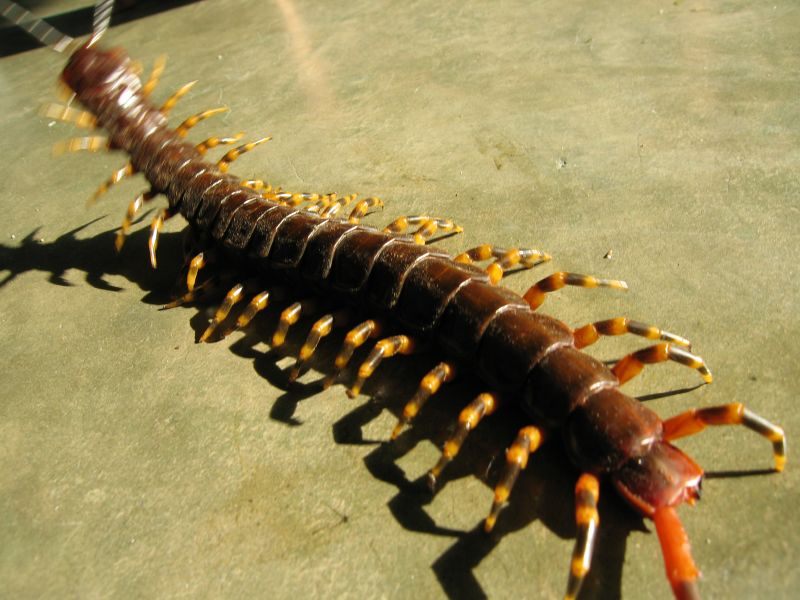
Scolopendra gigantea

===== Centipedes (Chilopoda) =====
The biggest of the centipedes is Scolopendra gigantea of the neotropics, reaching a length of 33 cm (13 in).

===== Millipedes (Diplopoda) =====
Two species of millipede both reach a very large size: Archispirostreptus gigas of East Africa and Scaphistostreptus seychellarum, endemic to the Seychelles islands. Both of these species can slightly exceed a length of 28 cm (11 in) and measure over 2 cm (0.79 in) in diameter. though both of them pale in comparison to the largest known millipede known as the Arthropleura, a gigantic prehistoric specimen that reached nearly 189 cm (74 in).

===== Symphylans (Symphyla) =====
The largest known symphylan is Hanseniella magna, originating in Tasmanian caves, which can reach lengths from 25 mm (0.98 in) up to 30 mm (1.2 in).

==== Insects (Insecta) ====
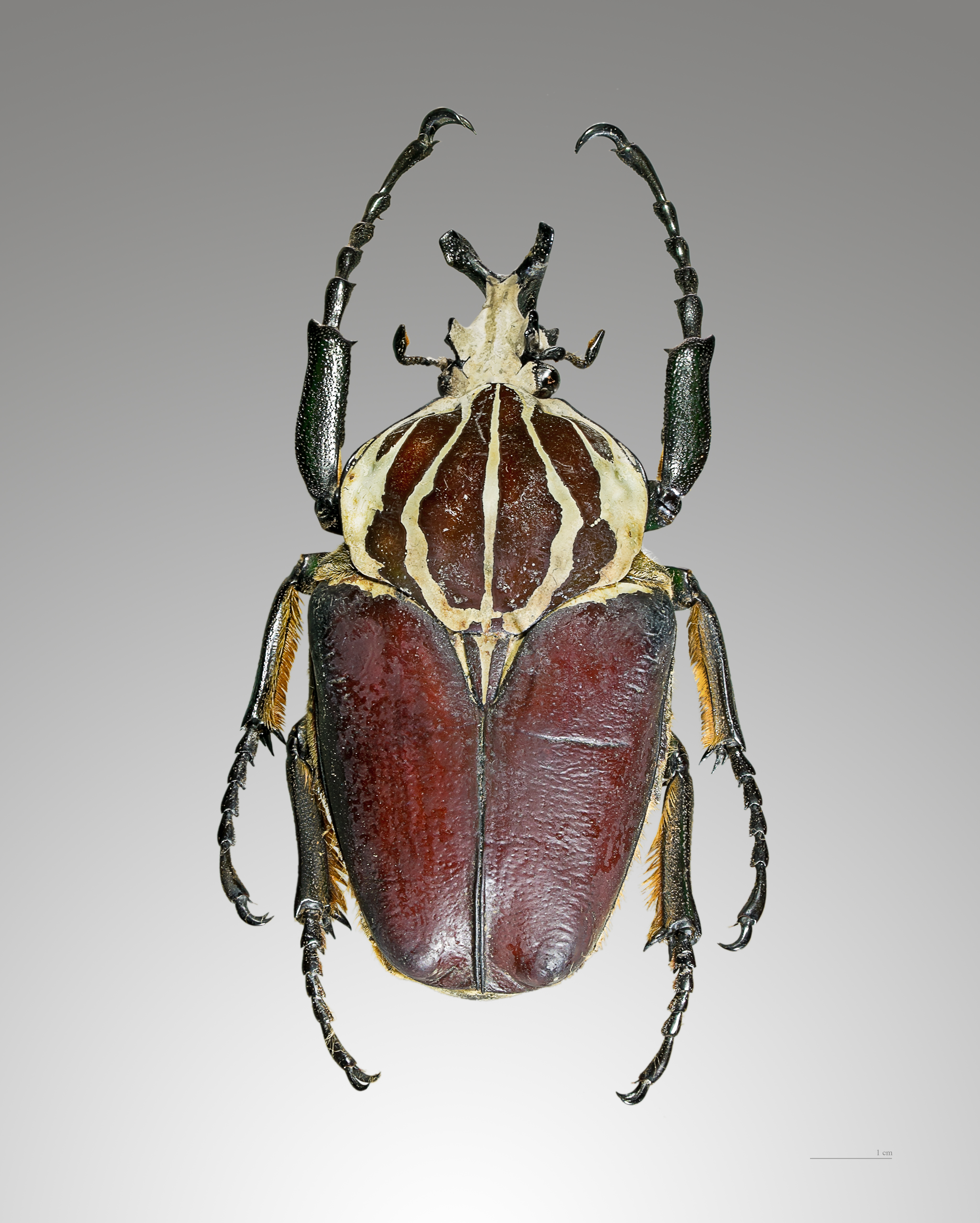
Goliath beetle

Insects, a class of Arthropoda, are easily the most numerous class of organisms, with over one million identified species, and probably many undescribed species. The heaviest insect is almost certainly a species of beetle, which incidentally is the most species-rich order of organisms. Although heavyweight giant wētās (Deinacrida heteracantha) are known, the elephant beetles of Central and South America, (Megasoma elephas) and (M. actaeon), the Titan beetle (Titanus giganteus) of the neotropical rainforest or the Goliath beetles, (Goliathus goliatus) and (G. regius), of Africa's rainforest are thought to reach a higher weight. The most frequently crowned are the Goliath beetles, the top known size of which is at least 100 g (3.5 oz) and 11.5 cm (4.5 in). The elephant beetles and titan beetle can reach greater lengths than the Goliath, at up to 13.1 and 15.2 cm (5.2 and 6.0 in), respectively, but this is in part thanks to their rather large horns. The Goliath beetle's wingspan can range up to 25 cm (9.8 in).

Some moths and butterflies have much larger areas than the heaviest beetles, but weigh a fraction as much.

The longest insects are the stick insects, see below.

Representatives of the extinct dragonfly-like order Meganisoptera, such as the Carboniferous Meganeura monyi of what is now France and the Permian Meganeuropsis permiana of what is now North America, are the largest insect species known to have existed. These creatures had a wingspan of some 75 cm (30 in) and a mass of over 1 pound (450 g), making them about the size of a crow.

===== Cockroaches and termites (Blattodea) =====
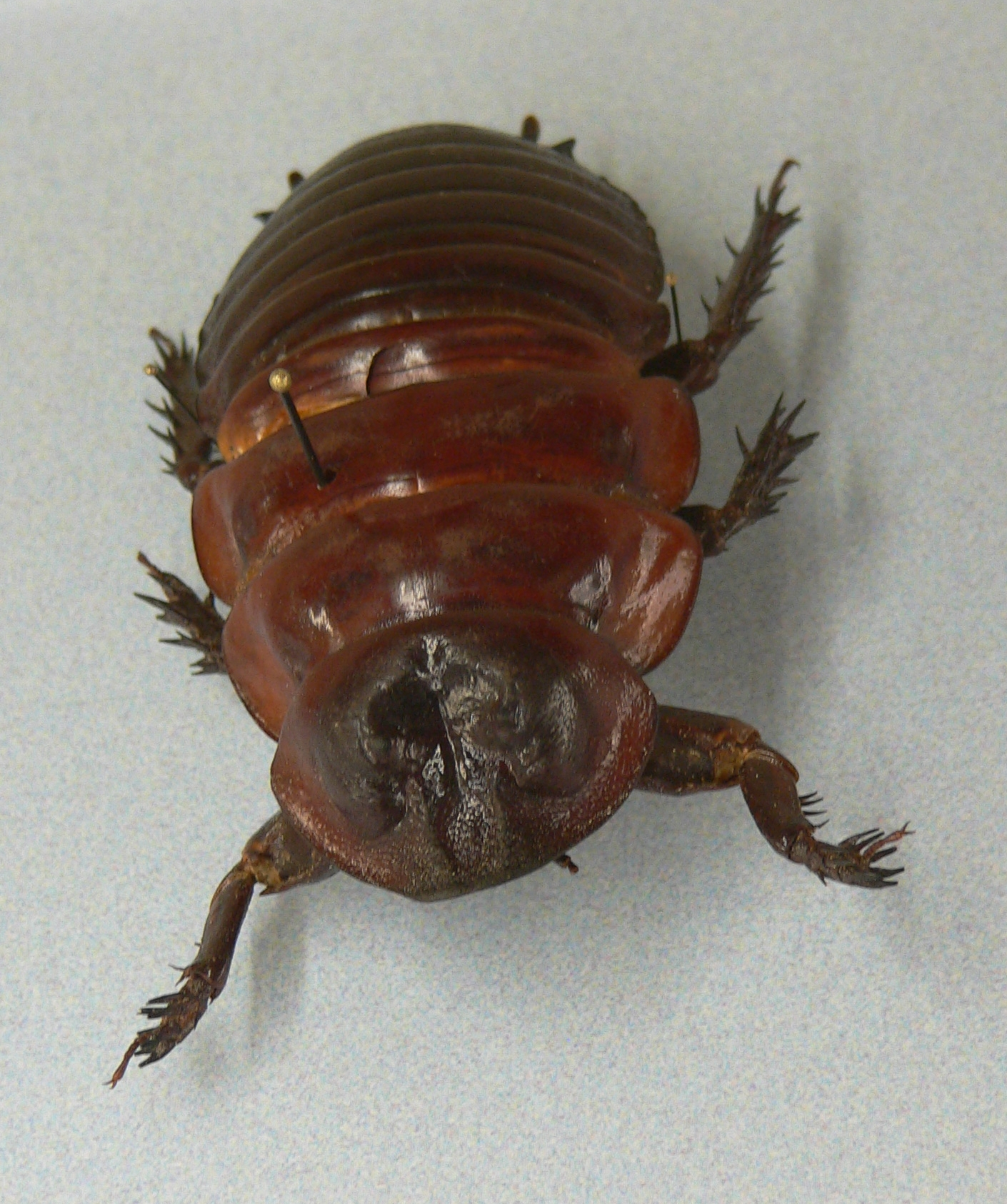
Giant burrowing cockroach

The largest cockroach by body mass is the Australian giant burrowing cockroach (Macropanesthia rhinoceros), also known as the rhinoceros cockroach. This species can attain a length of 8.3 cm (3.3 in) and a weight of 36 g (1.3 oz). It does not have wings. The Brazilian giant cockroach (Blaberus giganteus) of the neotropics reaches greater sizes of up to 10 cm in length and 15 cm in wingspan, although it is not as massive and heavy as the burrowing species. The termites, traditionally classified in their own order (Isoptera), have recently been re-considered to belong in Blattodea. The largest of the termites is the African species Macrotermes bellicosus. The queen of this species can attain a length of 14 cm (5.5 in) and breadth of 5.5 cm (2.2 in) across the abdomen; other adults, on the other hand, are about a third of the size.

===== Beetles (Coleoptera) =====
The beetles are the largest order of organisms on earth, with about 400,000 species so far identified. The most massive species are the Goliathus, Megasoma and Titanus beetles already mentioned. Another fairly large species is the Hercules beetle (Dynastes hercules) of the neotropic rainforest with a maximum overall length of at least 19 cm (7.5 in) including the extremely long pronotal horn. The weight in this species does not exceed 16.5 g (0.58 oz). The longest overall beetle is a species of longhorn beetle, Batocera wallacei, from New Guinea, which can attain a length of 26.6 cm (10.5 in), about 19 cm (7.5 in) of which is comprised by the long antennae.

===== Earwigs (Dermaptera) =====
Since 1798, the largest of the earwigs has been the Saint Helena giant earwig (Labidura herculeana), endemic to the island of its name, measuring up to 8 cm (3.1 in) in length. As of 2014, with the declaring of the organism extinct by the IUCN, this may no longer be the case, although some believe a small number of individuals are still extant.

===== True flies (Diptera) =====
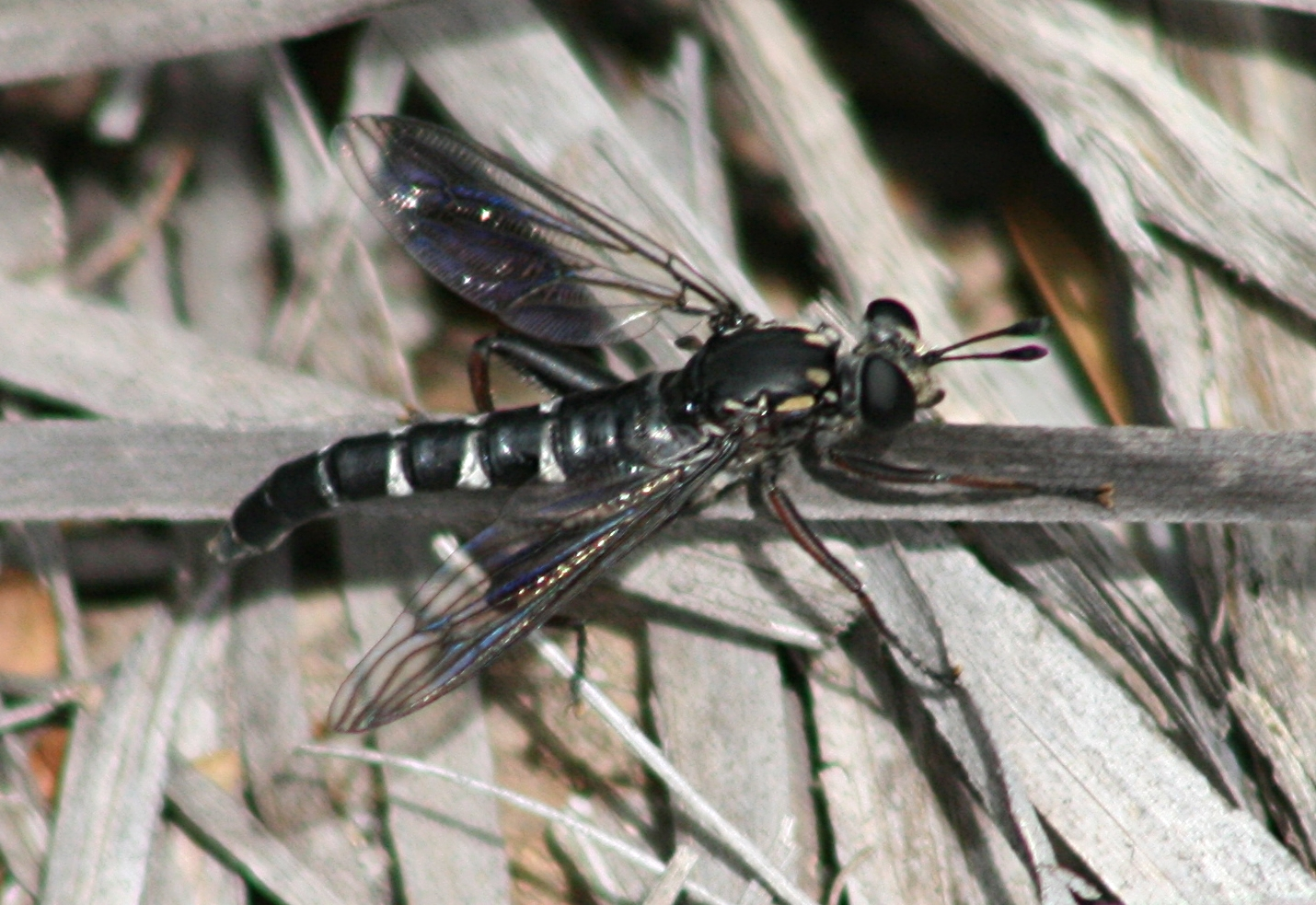
Gauromydas heros, the largest fly

The largest species of this order, which includes the common housefly, is the neotropical species Gauromydas heros, which can reach a length of 6 cm (2 3/8 in) and a wingspan of 10 cm (3.9 in). Species of crane fly, the largest of which is Holorusia brobdignagius, can attain a length of 23 cm (9.1 in) but are extremely slender and much lighter in weight than Gauromydas.

===== Mayflies (Ephemeroptera) =====
The largest mayflies are members of the genus Proboscidoplocia from Madagascar. These insects can reach a length of 7 cm (2.8 in).

===== True bugs (Hemiptera) =====
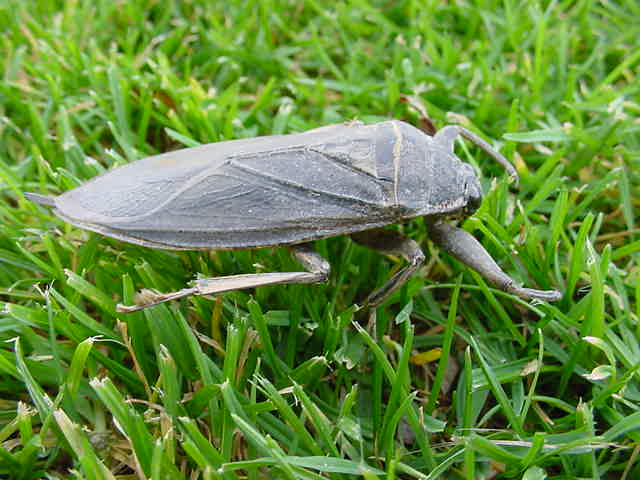
Giant water bug walking over land

The largest species of this diverse order is usually listed as the giant water bug in the genus Lethocerus, with L. maximus from the Neotropics being the absolutely largest. They can surpass 12 cm (4.7 in) in length, with some suggesting that the maximum size is 15 cm (5.9 in). It is more slender and less heavy than most other insects of this size (principally the huge beetles). The largest cicada is Megapomponia imperatoria, which has a head-body length of about 7 cm (2.8 in) and a wingspan of 18–20 cm (7–8 in). The cicadas of the genus Tacua can also grow to comparably large sizes. The largest type of aphid is the giant oak aphid (Stomaphis quercus), which can reach an overall length of 2 cm (0.79 in). The biggest species of leafhopper is Ledromorpha planirostris, which can reach a length of 2.8 cm (1.1 in).

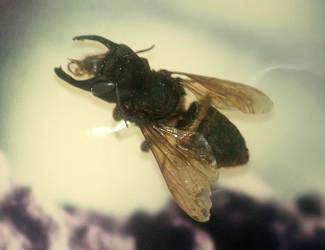
Megachile pluto, the largest bee.

===== Ants and allies (Hymenoptera) =====
The largest of the ants, and the heaviest species of the order, are the females of the African Dorylus helvolus, reaching a length of 5.1 cm (2.0 in) and a weight of 8.5 g (0.30 oz). The ant that averages the largest for the mean size within the whole colony is a ponerine ant, Dinoponera gigantea, from South America, averaging up to 3.3 cm (1.3 in) from the mandibles to the end of abdomen. Workers of the bulldog ant (Myrmecia brevinoda) of Australia are up to 3.7 cm (1.5 in) in total length, although much of this is from their extremely large mandibles. The largest of the bee species, also in the order Hymenoptera, is Megachile pluto of Indonesia, the females of which can be 3.8 cm (1.5 in) long, with a 6.3 cm (2.5 in) wingspan. Nearly as large, the carpenter bees can range up to 2.53 cm (1.00 in). The largest wasp is probably the so-called tarantula hawk species Pepsis pulszkyi of South America, at up to 6.8 cm (2.7 in) long and 11.6 cm (4.6 in) wingspan, although many other Pepsis approach a similar size. The giant scarab-hunting wasp Megascolia procer may rival the largest tarantula hawks in weight and wingspan, though its body is not as long.

===== Moths and allies (Lepidoptera) =====
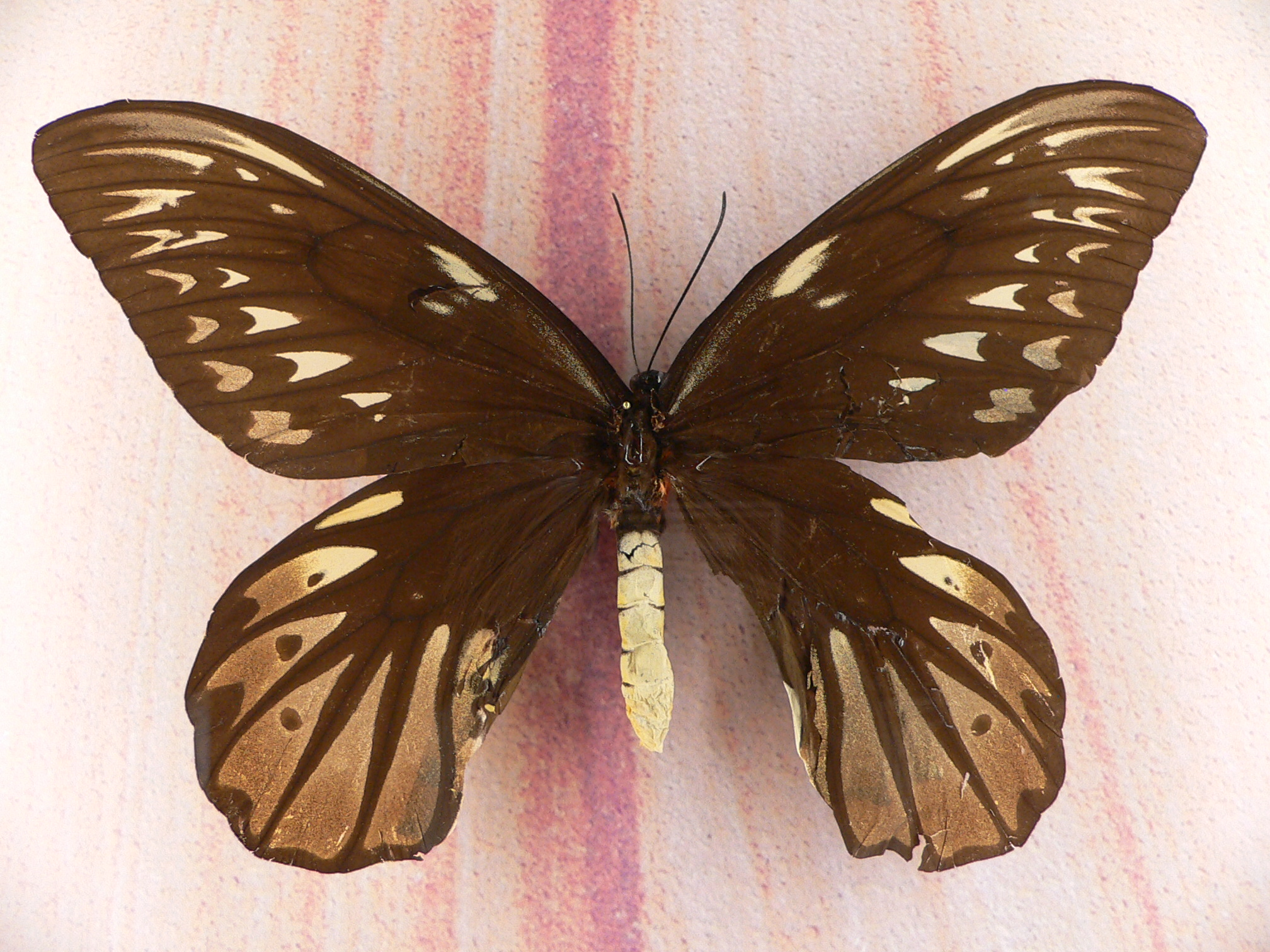
Queen Alexandra's birdwing

The Hercules moth (Coscinocera hercules), in the family Saturniidae, is endemic to New Guinea and northern Australia, and its wings have the largest documented surface area (300 square centimeters) of any living insect, and a maximum wingspan which is confirmed to 28 cm (11 in) while unconfirmed specimens have spanned up to 35.5 cm (14.0 in). The largest species overall is often claimed to be either the Queen Alexandra's birdwing (Ornithoptera alexandrae), a butterfly from Papua New Guinea, or the Atlas moth (Attacus atlas), a moth from Southeast Asia. Both of these species can reach a length of 8 cm (3.1 in), a wingspan of 28 cm (11 in) and a weight of 12 g (0.42 oz). One Atlas moth allegedly had a wingspan of 30 cm (12 in) but this measurement was not verified. The larvae in the previous species can weigh up to 58 and 54 g (2.0 and 1.9 oz), respectively. The white witch (Thysania agrippina) of Central and South America, has the largest recorded wingspan of the order, and indeed of any living insect. The verified record-sized Thysania spanned 30.8 cm (12.1 in) across the wings, although specimens have been reported to 36 cm (14 in). The heaviest mature moths have been cited in the giant carpenter moth (Xyleutes boisduvali) of Australia, which has weighed up to 20 g (0.71 oz) although the species does not surpass 25.5 cm (10.0 in) in wingspan.

====== Mantises (Mantodea) ======
The largest species of this order is Toxodera denticulata from Java, which has been measured up to 20 cm (7.9 in) in overall length. However, an undescribed species from the Cameroon jungle is allegedly much larger than any other mantis and may rival the larger stick insects for the longest living insect. Among widespread mantis species, the largest is the Chinese mantis (Tenodera aridifolia). The females of this species can attain a length of up to 10.6 cm (4.2 in).

====== Scorpionflies (Mecoptera) ======
The largest scorpionfly, the common scorpionfly (Panorpa communis), can reach a body length of about 30 millimetres (1.2 in).

====== Alderflies and allies (Megaloptera) ======
This relatively small insect order includes some rather large species, many of which are noticeable for their elongated, imposing mandibles. The dobsonflies reach the greatest sizes of the order and can range up to 12.5 cm (4.9 in) in length.

====== Net-winged insects (Neuroptera) ======
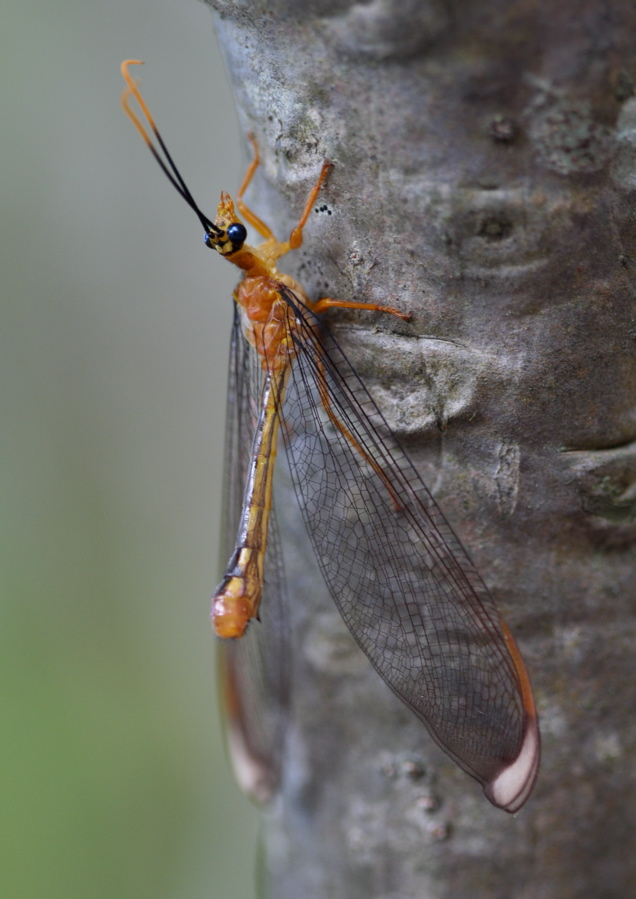
Blue eyes lacewing (Nymphes myrmeleonides)

These flying insects reach their largest size in Palparellus voeltzkowi, which can have a wingspan over 16 cm (6.3 in). The largest lacewing is the "blue eyes lacewing" (Nymphes myrmeleonides) of Australia, which can measure up to 4 cm (1.6 in) in length and span 11 cm (4.3 in) across the wings. Some forms of this ancient order could grow extremely large during the Jurassic period. Found in the Early Cretaceous sedimentary rocks, Makarkinia adamsi had wings nearly 14–16 cm (5.5–6.3 in) in length, implying a wingspan similar to the present-day largest moths.

====== Dragonflies and damselflies (Odonata) ======
The largest species of Odonata is the damselfly Megaloprepus caerulatus of the neotropics, attaining a size of as much as 19 cm (7.5 in) across the wings and a body length of over 12 cm (4.7 in). The largest species of dragonfly is Tetracanthagyna plagiata of Southeast Asia, spanning up to 17.6 cm (6.9 in) and measuring up to 11.8 cm (4.6 in) long; while bulkier and heavier than Megaloprepus (at up to 7 g (0.25 oz)), it is smaller in its linear dimensions.

====== Grasshoppers and allies (Orthoptera) ======
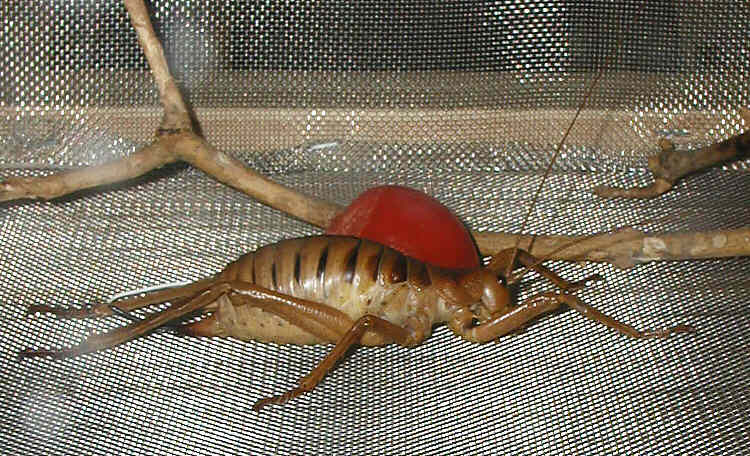
Giant wētā

The largest of this widespread, varied complex of insects are the giant wētās of New Zealand, which is now split among 12 species. The largest of these is the Little Barrier Island giant wētā (Deinacrida heteracantha), the largest specimen was weighed at 71.3 g (2.52 oz), one of the largest insect weights ever known. These heavyweight insects can be over 9 cm (3.5 in) long. The largest grasshopper species is often considered to be the Australian giant grasshopper (Valanga irregularis), which ranges up to 9 cm (3.5 in) in length. The American eastern lubber grasshopper (Romalea guttata) can allegedly range up to 10 cm (3.9 in) in length. However, the greatest grasshopper sizes known, to 12 cm (4.7 in), have been cited in the South American giant grasshopper (Tropidacris violaceus). The longest members of this order (although much lighter than the giant wētās) is the katydid Macrolyristes corporalis of Southeast Asia which can range up to 21.5 cm (8.5 in) with its long legs extended and can have a wingspan of 20 cm (7.9 in).

====== Stick insects (Phasmatodea) ======
The longest known stick insects are also the longest known insects, notably species in the tribe Pharnaciini, but they are generally relatively lightweight because of their slender shape. The longest is an unnamed species of Phryganistria discovered in China in 2016, where a specimen held at the Insect Museum of West China in Chengdu has a total length of 62.4 cm (24.6 in). The second-longest species is the Australian Ctenomorpha gargantua, females of which have been measured at over 60 cm (24 in) in total length. Other very large species, formerly believed to be longest but now considered third longest is Sadyattes chani; a specimen held in the Natural History Museum in London has a total length of 56.7 cm (22.3 in). These measurements are, however, with the front legs fully extended; it has a body length measuring 35.7 cm (14.1 in). Another very large species is Phobaeticus kirbyi where the total length (including extended legs) is up to 54.6 cm (21.5 in) and the body alone up to 32.8 cm (12.9 in). Another of the longest insect in terms of total length is Phobaeticus serratipes of Malaysia and Singapore, measuring up to 55.5 cm (21.9 in). Another extremely long stick insect is Pharnacia maxima, which measured 51 cm (20 in) with its legs extended. The spiny stick insect (Heteropteryx dilatata) of Malaysia does not reach the extreme lengths of its cousins, the body reaching up to 16 cm (6.3 in) long, but it is much bulkier. The largest Heteropteryx weighed about 65 g (2.3 oz) and was 3.5 cm (1.4 in) wide across the thickest part of the body.

====== Stoneflies (Plecoptera) ======
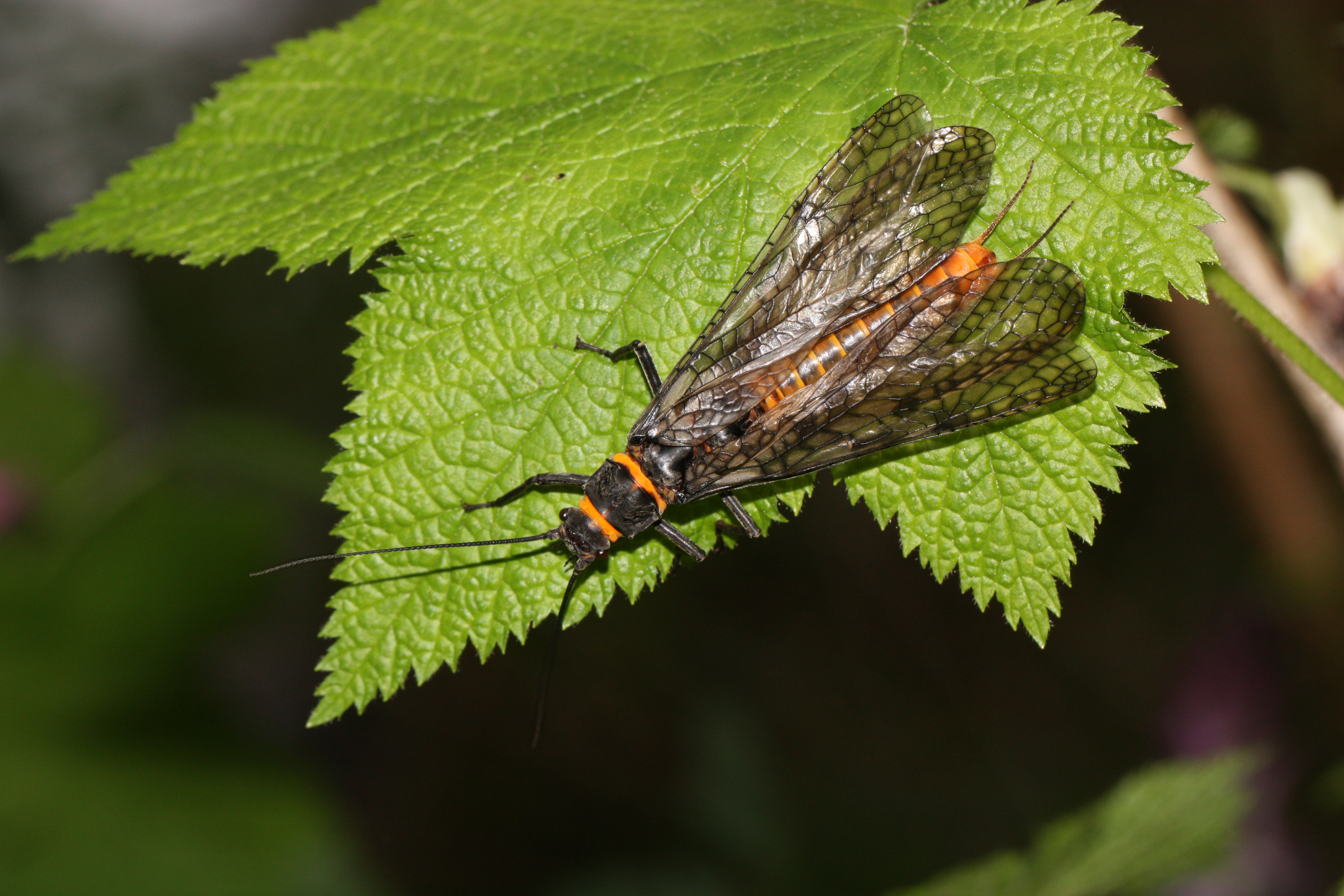
Pteronarcys californica

The largest species of stonefly is Pteronarcys californica of western North America, a species favored by fishermen as lures. This species can attain a length of 5 cm (2.0 in) and a wingspan of over 9.5 cm (3.7 in).

====== Caddisflies (Trichoptera) ======
The largest of the small, moth-like caddisflies is Eubasilissa maclachlani. This species can range up to 7 cm (2.8 in) across the wings.

====== Lice (Phthiraptera) ======
These insects, which live parasitically on other animals, are as a rule quite small. The largest known species is the hog louse, Haematopinus suis, a sucking louse that lives on large livestock like pigs and cattle. It can range up to 6 mm (0.24 in) in length.

====== Booklice (Psocoptera) ======
The largest of this order of very small insects are the barklice of the genus Psocus, the top size of which is about 10 mm (0.39 in).

====== Fleas (Siphonaptera) ======
The largest species of flea is Hystrichopsylla schefferi. This parasite is known exclusively from the fur of the mountain beaver (Aplodontia rufa) and can reach a length of 12 mm (0.47 in).

====== Thrips (Thysanoptera) ======
Members of the genus Phasmothrips are the largest kinds of thrips. The maximum size these species attain is approximately 13 mm (0.51 in) in length.

====== Angel insects (Zoraptera) ======
The largest angel insect species, Hubbard's angel insect (Zorotypus hubbardi), grows up to 3 mm (0.12 in) in length.

====== Silverfish and allies (Zygentoma) ======
The largest extant silverfish is Acrotelsa collaris, at up to 18 mm (0.7 in).

=== Cnidarians (Cnidaria) ===
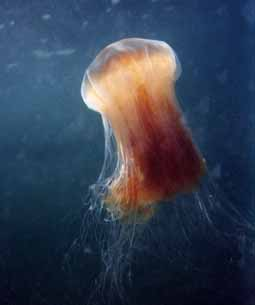
The lion's mane jellyfish, one of the longest extant animals

The lion's mane jellyfish (Cyanea capillata) is the largest cnidarian species, of the class Scyphozoa. The largest known specimen of this giant, found washed up on the shore of Massachusetts Bay in 1870, had a bell diameter of 2.5 m (8.2 ft), a weight of 150 kg (330 lb). The tentacles of this specimen were as long as 37 m (121 ft) and were projected to have a tentacular spread of about 75 m (246 ft) making it one of the longest extant animals.

==== Corals and sea anemones (Anthozoa) ====
The largest individual species are the sea-anemones of the genus Discoma, which can attain a mouth disc diameter of 60 cm (2.0 ft). Longer, but much less massive overall, are the anemones of the genus Ceriantharia, at up to 2 m (6.6 ft) tall.

Communities of coral can be truly massive, a single colony of the genus Porites can be over 10 m (33 ft), even though the individual polyps are quite small. In 2024, the largest ever was found off Malaulalo island in the Solomon Islands, a clonal colony of Pavona clavus over 32 by 34 meters — the size of two basketball courts.

==== Hydrozoans (Hydrozoa) ====
The colonial siphonophore Praya dubia can attain lengths of 40–50 m (130–160 ft). The Portuguese man o' war's (Physalia physalis) tentacles can attain a length of up to 50 m (160 ft). On 6 April 2020 the Schmidt Ocean Institute announced the discovery of a giant Apolemia siphonophore in submarine canyons near Ningaloo Coast, measuring 15 metres (49 feet) diameter with a ring approximately 47 metres (154 feet) long, claiming it was possibly the largest siphonophore ever recorded. Stygiomedusa, (Note: from Ancient Greek Στύγιος (Stúgios) 'Stygian,', Μέδουσα (Médousa) 'Medusa,' and γιγάντεια (gigánteia) 'gigantic') commonly known as the giant phantom jelly, is the only species in the monotypic genus of deep sea jellyfish, Stygiomedusa. It is in the Ulmaridae family. With only around 110 sightings in 110 years, it is rarely seen, but is believed to be widespread throughout the world, with the exception of the Arctic Ocean.

==== Box jellyfishes (Chirodropida) ====
The largest box jellyfish Chironex fleckeri is the largest of the cubozoans (collectively called box jellyfish), many of which may carry toxic venom. Its bell usually reaches about 16 cm (6.3 in) in diameter but can grow up to 35 cm (14 in). Each of the four corners of the bell trails a cluster of 15 tentacles. The pale blue bell has faint markings; viewed from certain angles, it bears a somewhat eerie resemblance to a human head or skull. Since it is virtually transparent, the creature is nearly impossible to see in its habitat, posing significant danger to swimmers.

=== Sponges (Porifera) ===
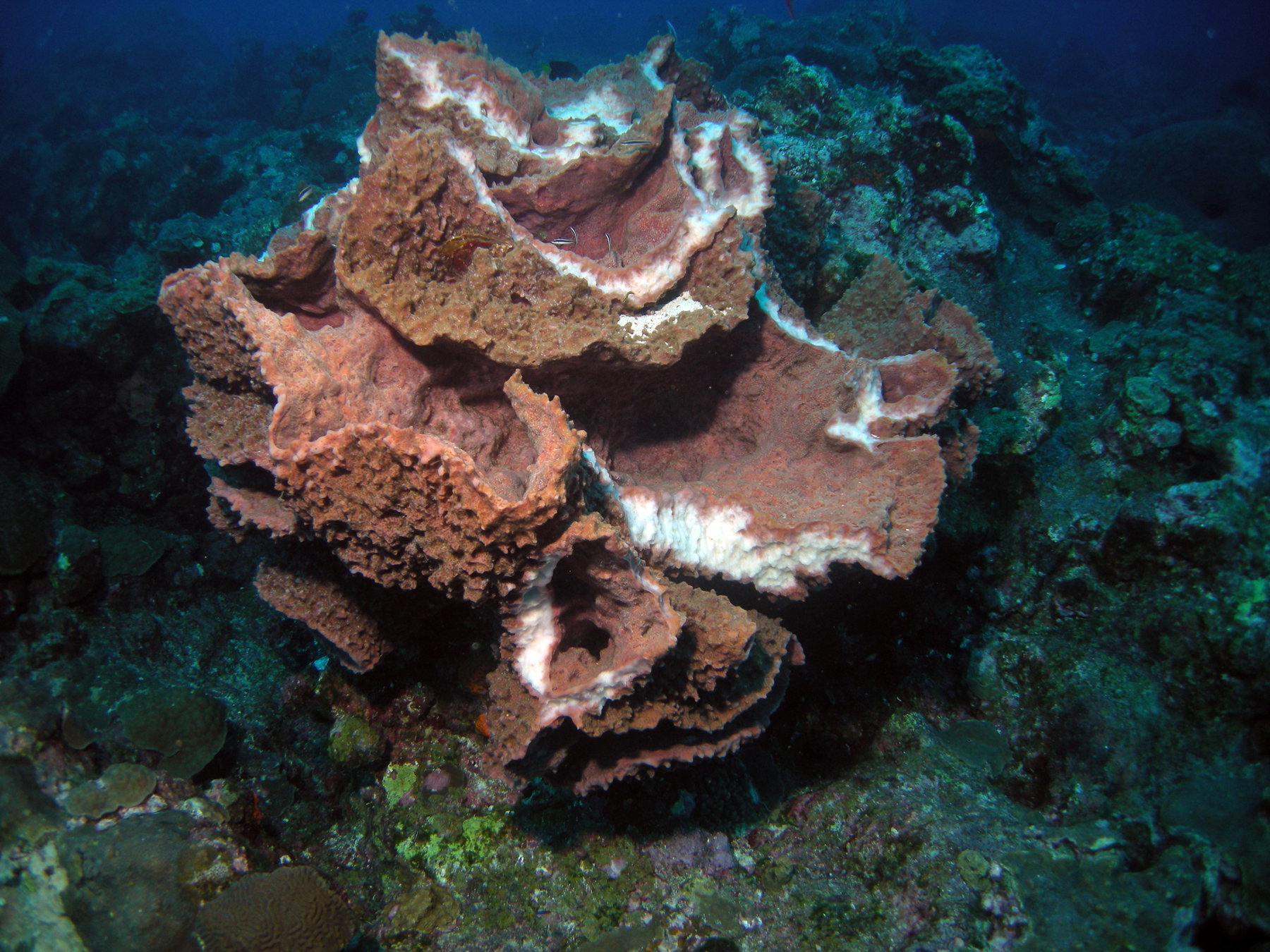
Despite its inert appearance, the heavyweight Xestospongia muta is indeed an animal

The largest known species of sea sponge is the giant barrel sponge, Xestospongia muta. These massively built sponges can reach 2.4 m (8 ft) in height and can be about the same thickness at the thickest part of the "body". Some of these creatures have been estimated to be over 2,400 years of age.

==== Calcareous sponges (Calcarea) ====
The largest known of these small, inconspicuous sponges is probably the species Pericharax heteroraphis, attaining a height of 30 cm (0.98 ft). Most calcareous sponges do not exceed 10 cm (3.9 in) tall.

==== Hexactinellid sponges (Hexactinellida) ====
A relatively common species, Rhabdocalyptus dawsoni, can reach a height of 1 m (3.3 ft) once they are of a very old age. This is the maximum size recorded for a hexactinellid sponge.

== See also ==
- Largest prehistoric animals
- Megafauna
- Largest organisms
