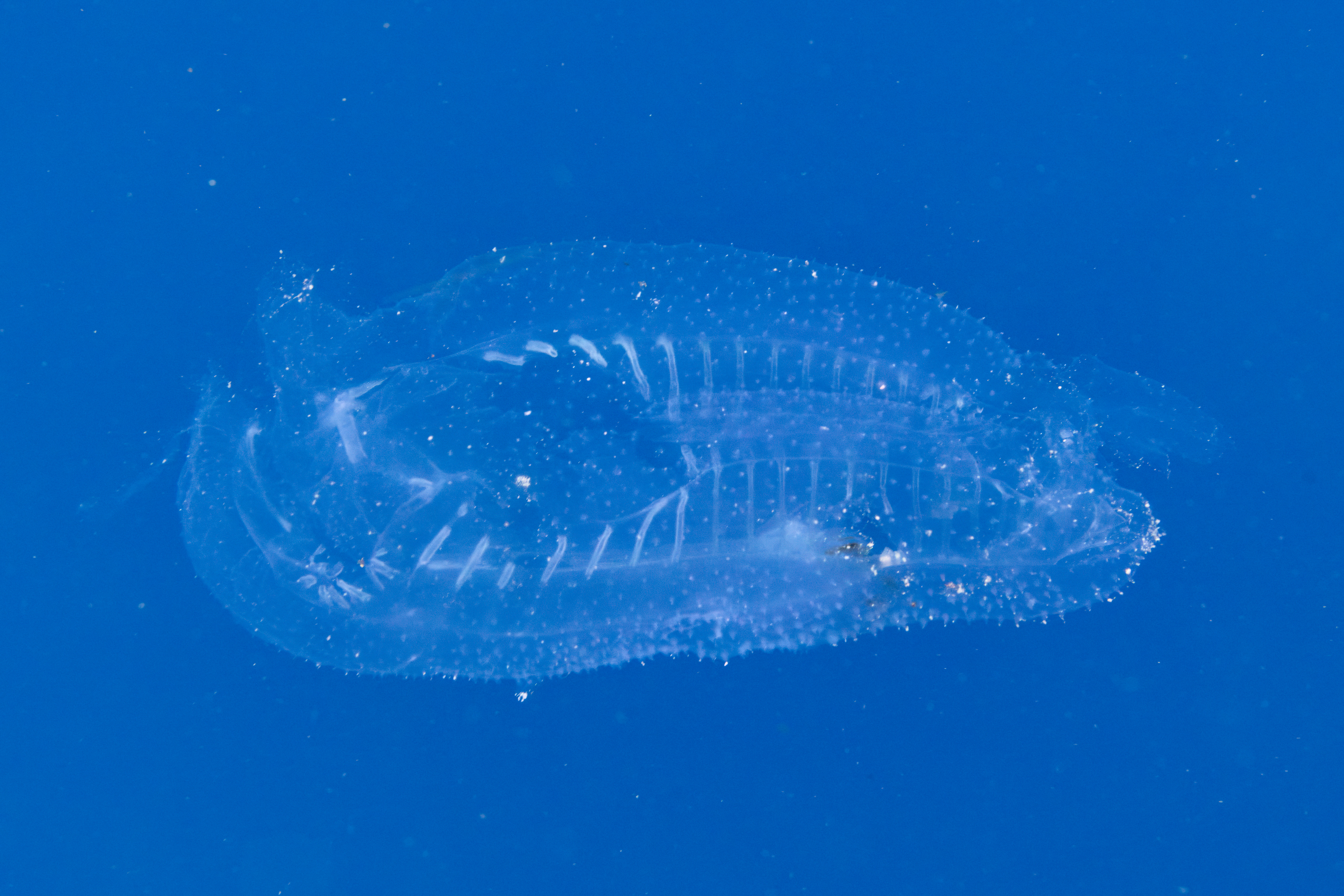

Scientific classification
- Kingdom: Animalia
- Phylum: Chordata
- Subphylum: Tunicata
- Class: Thaliacea
- Order: Salpida
- Family: Salpidae
- Subfamily: Salpinae
- Genus: Thetys; Tilesius, 1802
- Species: T. vagina

Binomial name
- Thetys vagina Tilesius, 1802

Synonyms
- Thetys costata (Quoy & Gaimard, 1825); Thetys tilesii (Cuvier, 1804); Salpa vagina Ihle, 1911

= Thetys vagina =

Species of tunicate (Not to be confused with the titan or the saturnian moon)

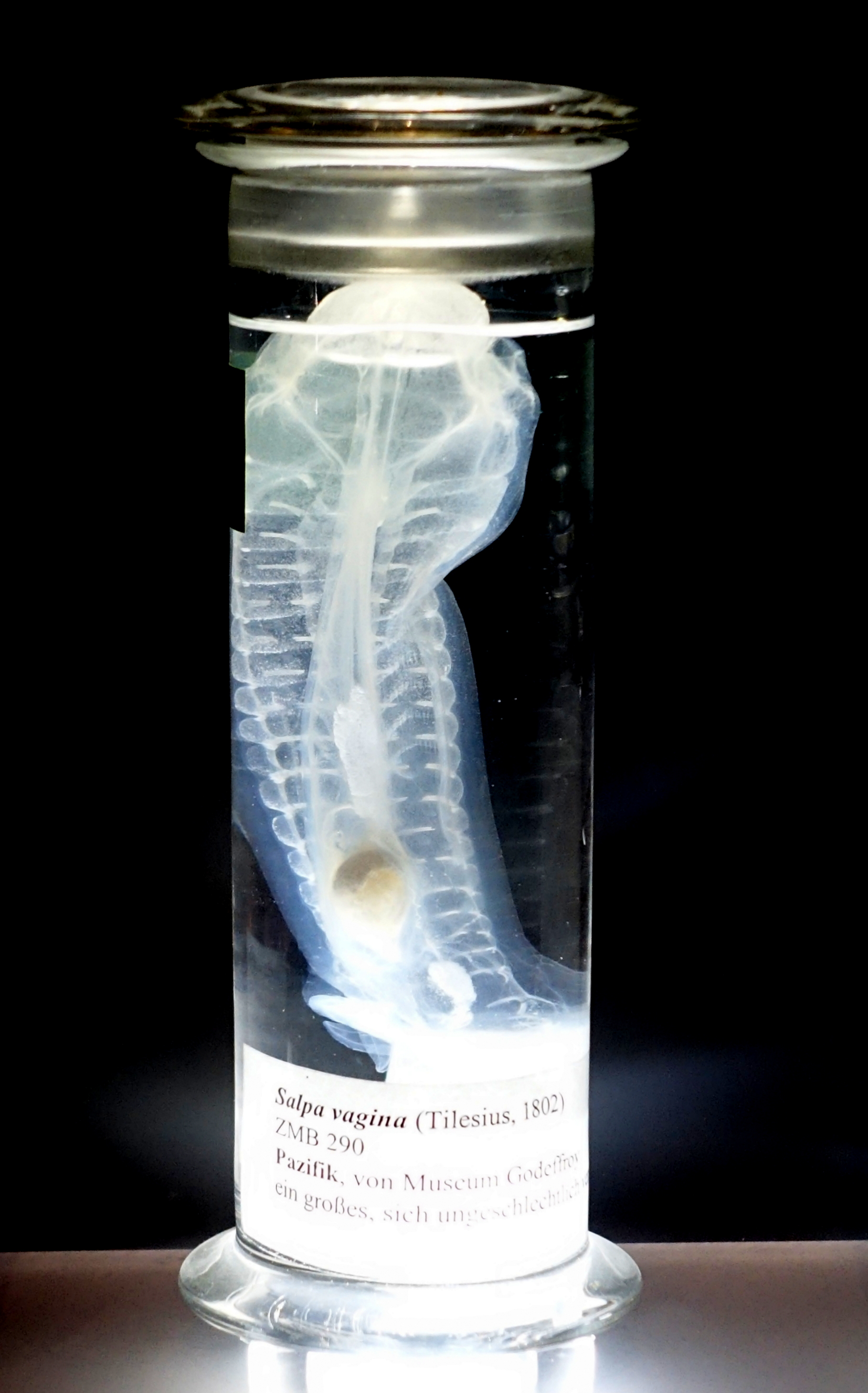
Exemplar in the Science Museum of Berlin

Thetys vagina, or the twin-sailed salp, is the largest known solitary species of salp and the only valid species of the genus Thetys, which was first described by Wilhelm G. Tilesius in 1802. The species is transparent and gelatinous, making it difficult to be seen in water, which is helpful in avoiding predators. It has a very recent fossil range. Other animals often mistaken for T. vagina are Salpa fusiformis, Aurelia aurita, and Pegea confoederata. T. vagina DNA was sequenced as part of a larger project in 2014 where spiny lobster larvae were found attached to T. vagina and consuming it.

== Etymology ==
The generic name of Thetys derives from Tethys or Thetis, Greek mythological figures. Tethys was the mother of river gods and the Oceanids, while Thetis was the goddess of water, a nereid, or a sea nymph. The species epithet is Latin vagina meaning "sheath" or "scabbard." At the time of Tilesius' naming, the term was still commonly used to refer to a sheath, and did not exclusively have the modern-day anatomical meaning.

== Description ==
T. vagina can reach up to 333 mm (13.1 in) long. They develop into two distinct forms; the aggregate generation and the solitary generation. The aggregated sexual blastozooids (aggregate form) can get to the size of 250 mm (9.8 in) and have five muscle bands. The solitary asexual oozooids (solitary form) can get to size of 300 mm (12 in) and have around 20 muscle bands, which are characterized as "striped" with two short dark-colored tentacles at their ends, attached at the upper and lower halves of the body. Both the aggregate and the solitary forms have tests covered in ridges and grooves. They have a colored digestive system seen as a dark or colorful lump. The embryos have been found to be between 10–15 mm (0.39–0.59 in).

== Distribution ==
Thetys vagina is found in pelagic marine environments. It occurs in tropical and temperate waters of the Pacific, Atlantic and Indian Ocean and is occasionally found in colder waters in the northern Atlantic, likely following warm water currents. The species is widespread but at low density (although they may occasionally be found at very high density), resulting in only rare accounts of it being caught.

Thetys vagina has been found off the central coast of British Columbia, marking its north-most occurrence to date. It has been found by cataloging volunteers along the West Coast of the U.S. and reportedly congests nets of fishermen off the coast of northern Honshu and southern Hokkaido, Japan. In January 2009, the largest measured biomass of T. vagina was recorded at 852 g WW m^{−3} in the Tasman Sea.

Thetys vagina stays in the photic zone and is often found in places of high chlorophyll concentration, likely due to its phytoplankton rich diet. A large increase of T. vagina is associated with an increase in phytoplankton. The ecology of this species is not fully understood.

== Diet ==
Like other salps, T. vagina feeds by consuming plankton nutrient water on one end of its body, filtering it via an internal net made of mucus, and spewing the water out the other end. Their internal net is very effective, catching particles spanning four magnitudes in size. This action also allows them to move through the water column, classifying them as nektonic. T. vagina feeds on marine plankton, including single-celled organisms such as dinoflagellates, silicoflagellates, diatoms, and tintinnids, as well as copepods and other small particles. In turn, T. vagina is preyed upon by medusae, siphonophores, ctenophores, heteropods, sea turtles, late stage larvae of the spiny lobster, marine birds, along with various species of fish. They have a high energy content at (11.00 kJ g^{−1} DW).

In a study conducted in the Japan Sea in 2006, the gut contents of T. vagina were evaluated. The diatom Coscinodiscus spp. (13–55 μm in diameter) was found to be the major makeup of the guts, with the diatom Coscinodiscus wailesii (219–313 μm) being the second most prevalent. Another study off the coast of Maine found T. vagina gut content to be mainly made up of two dinoflagellates; Prorocentrummicans and Dinophysis norvegica. The study also found T. vagina to be an indiscriminate feeder over a broad size spectrum.

== Ecology ==
Waste from T. vagina is densely packed, sinks quickly, and is full of carbon. Their carcasses also sink quickly and are carbon rich (31% dry weight, DW). This makes them efficient carbon sinks, but also harder to study. This carbon exchange could be responsible for up to 67% of the mean organic daily carbon flux in the area. In 2007 and 2009, the Tasman Sea floor was analyzed from 200 to 2,500 m (660 to 8,200 ft) in depth and large quantities of T. vagina were found. The quantities found were some of the largest gelatinous zooplankton depositions ever recorded. Further, benthic communities were found consuming T. vagina carcasses. This sink provides nutrients to these benthic communities and are likely a large source of carbon input.
