= Salpa (disambiguation) =

A salpa is a marine animal of the family Salpidae.

Salpa may also refer to:

- SalPa, the abbreviation of Salon Palloilijat, a Finnish football club
- Salpa (submarine), two Italian submarines
- Salpa (tunicate), a genus of tunicates
- Salpa Line, a bunker line on the eastern border of Finland
- Salpa Pokhari, a lake in Bhojpur District, Nepal
- Georgia Salpa, a Greek-Irish glamour model
- Sarpa salpa, a species of sea bream
