= Craspedodiscus =

Craspedodiscus may refer to:

- Craspedodiscus (diatom), a diatom genus in the family Coscinodiscaceae
- Craspedodiscus (ammonite), an ammonite genus from the mid Early Cretaceous in the family Olcostephanitidae
