= Poor Knights =

Poor Knights names various groups:

- The Poor Knights of Christ and the Temple of Solomon, or Knights Templar, a major Catholic military order, 1129–1312
- The Poor Knights of Windsor, or Military Knights of Windsor, military pensioners in the UK, ~1346–present
- The Poor Knights of Christ, Militia Templi, a Catholic lay order founded in 1979

It may also refer to:

- French toast, sometimes just "poor knights", sometimes "poor knights of Windsor"
- Poor Knights Islands, New Zealand
  - The Poor Knights Lily, Xeronema callistemon
  - Poor Knights Islands Marine Reserve
- "The Poor Knights of Acre", song by The Templars (band)
