= Archway Island =

Archway Island may refer to:

- Archway Islands, New Zealand
- Archway Island (Antipodes Island Group), New Zealand
- Archway Island (Kawau Island), New Zealand
- Archway Island (Poor Knights Islands), New Zealand
