= Palmeria =

Palmeria may refer to:

- Palmeria (bird), the ʻAkohekohe, a genus of Hawaiian honeycreeper
- Palmeria (plant), a plant genus in the family Monimiaceae
- Palmeria (diatom), a centric diatom of the family Coscinodiscaceae
