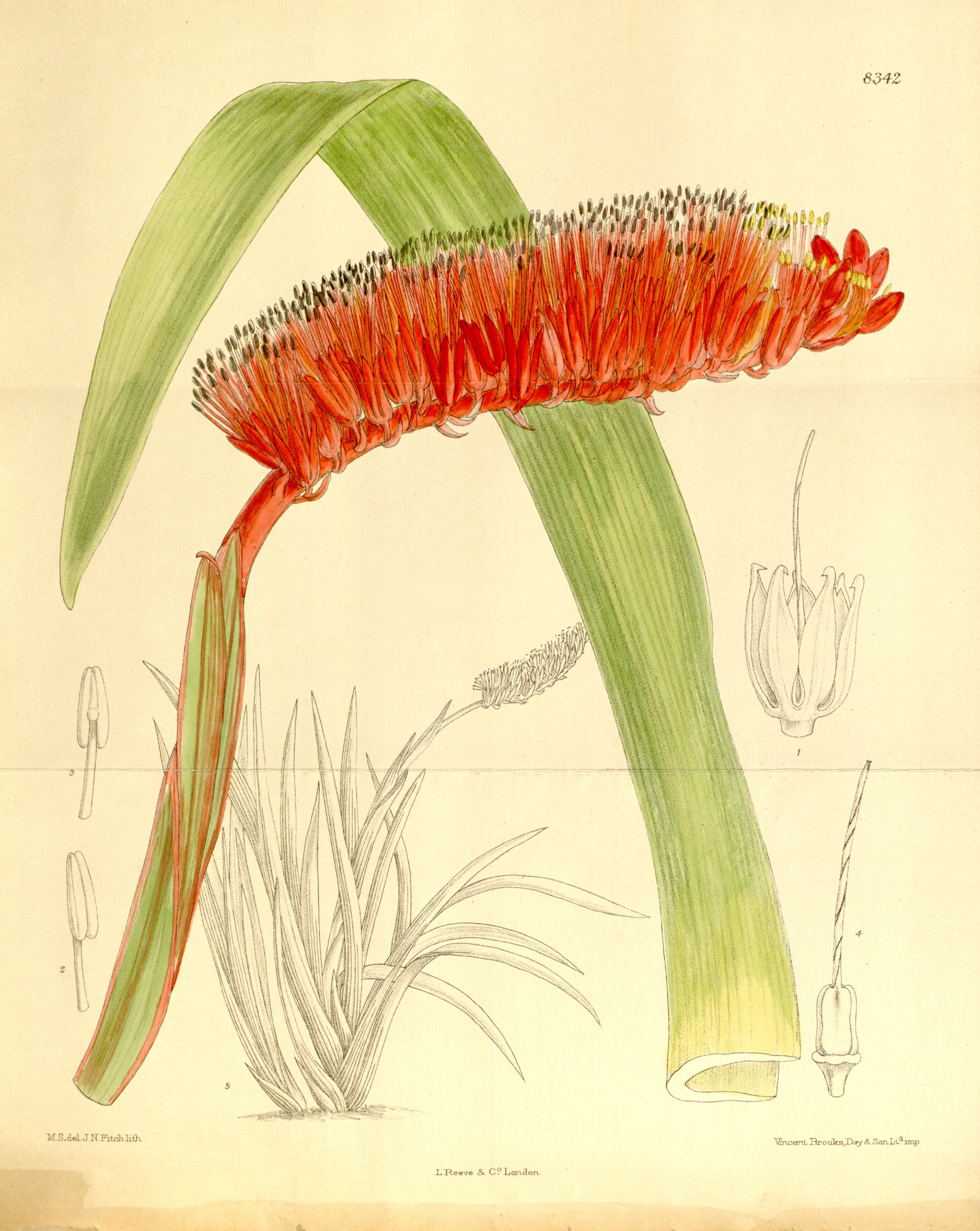
- Xeronema moorei

Scientific classification
- Kingdom: Plantae
- Clade: Tracheophytes
- Clade: Angiosperms
- Clade: Monocots
- Order: Asparagales
- Family: Xeronemataceae; M.W.Chase, Rudall & M.F.Fay
- Genus: Xeronema; Brongn. & Gris

Type species
- Xeronema moorei Brongn. & Gris

Species
- Xeronema callistemon; Xeronema moorei
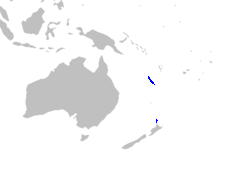
- Xeronema distribution map

Synonyms
- Scleronema Brongn. & Gris 1864 not Benth. 1862

= Xeronema =

Genus of flowering plants

Xeronema is a genus of flowering plants containing two species, Xeronema moorei from New Caledonia, and Xeronema callistemon (the Poor Knights lily) from the Poor Knights Islands and Taranga Island in New Zealand. The plants are herbaceous monocots, spreading by rhizomes, and have large flowers set on terminal spikes, with stamens towering above the flowers.

The type species X. moorei is found in the mountains of New Caledonia.

The Poor Knights lily (X. callistemon) is endemic to the Poor Knights Islands and Taranga Island in the north of New Zealand. It was discovered in 1924. The Poor Knights lily has large bottlebrush flower clusters that grow horizontally. The clusters begin growing vertically and then bend sideways. Bright red flowers grow upward from the stalk, with bright orange pollen. The plant can reach a height of one metre tall and across.

The APG IV system, of 2016, accepts this genus as constituting its own family Xeronemataceae. It places this in the order Asparagales, in the clade monocots. The family can be separated from other Asparagales families on DNA evidence; it is related to Asphodelaceae but differs in having uniformly unifacial leaves like Iridaceae.
