= Craspedodiscus elegans =

Scientific classification
- Domain: Eukaryota
- Clade: Diaphoretickes
- Clade: SAR
- Clade: Stramenopiles
- Phylum: Gyrista
- Subphylum: Ochrophytina
- Class: Bacillariophyceae
- Order: Coscinodiscales
- Family: Coscinodiscaceae
- Genus: Craspedodiscus
- Species: C. elegans

Binomial name
- Craspedodiscus elegans Ehrenberg (1844)

Synonyms
- Coscinodiscus craspedodiscus Kützing 1849

Species of single-celled organism

Craspedodiscus elegans is a species of diatoms in the genus Craspedodiscus. It is the type-species in the genus.
