= Salp (disambiguation) =

Salp is a barrel-shaped, planktonic tunicate in the family Salpidae.

Salp may also refer to:

- South Australian Labor Party
- South Australian Liberal Party
