= Raceme =

Flowers on short stalks along the stem

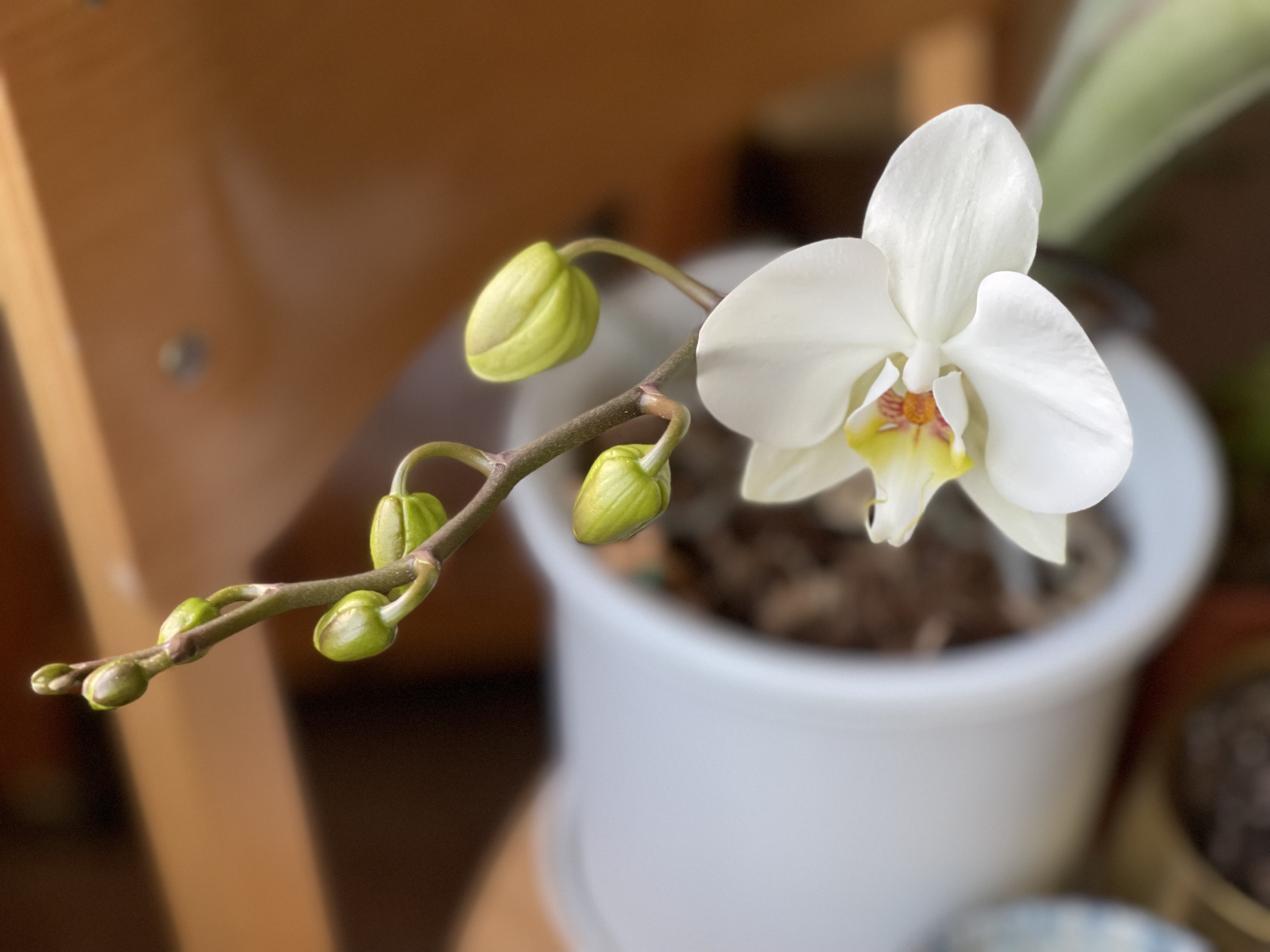
The inflorescence of a Phalaenopsis orchid is a typical raceme.

A raceme (/reɪˈsiːm, rə-/) or racemoid is an unbranched, indeterminate type of inflorescence bearing flowers having short floral stalks along the shoots that bear the flowers. The oldest flowers grow close to the base and new flowers are produced as the shoot grows in height, with no predetermined growth limit. Examples of racemes occur on mustard (genus Brassica), radish (genus Raphanus), and orchid (genus Phalaenopsis) plants.

== Definition ==
A raceme or racemoid is an unbranched, indeterminate type of inflorescence bearing pedicellate flowers (flowers having short floral stalks called pedicels) along its axis. In botany, an axis means a shoot, in this case one bearing the flowers. In indeterminate inflorescence-like racemes, the oldest flowers grow close to the base and new flowers are produced as the shoot grows in height, with no predetermined growth limit. A plant that flowers on a showy raceme may have this reflected in its scientific name, e.g. the species Actaea racemosa. A compound raceme, also called a panicle, has a branching main axis. Examples of racemes occur on mustard (genus Brassica) and radish (genus Raphanus) plants.

=== Spike ===
A spike is an unbranched, indeterminate inflorescence, similar to a raceme, but bearing sessile flowers (sessile flowers are attached directly, without stalks). Examples occur on Malabar nut (Justicia adhatoda) and chaff flowers (genus Achyranthes). A spikelet can refer to a small spike, although it primarily refers to the ultimate flower cluster unit in grasses (family Poaceae) and sedges (family Cyperaceae), in which case the stalk supporting the cluster becomes the pedicel. A true spikelet comprises one or more florets enclosed by two glumes (sterile bracts), with flowers and glumes arranged in two opposite rows along the spikelet. Examples occur on rice (species Oryza sativa) and wheat (genus Triticum), both grasses.

=== Catkin ===
An ament or catkin is very similar to a spike or raceme "but with subtending bracts so conspicuous as to conceal the flowers until pollination, as in the pussy willow, alder, [and] birch". These are sometimes called amentaceous plants.

=== Spadix ===
A spadix is a form of spike in which the florets are densely crowded along a fleshy axis and enclosed by one or more large, brightly colored bracts called spathes. Usually the female flowers grow at the base, and male flowers grow above. They are a characteristic of the family Araceae, for example jack-in-the-pulpit (species Arisaema triphyllum) and wild calla (genus Calla).

== Examples ==
Raceme

Spike

Catkin

Spadix

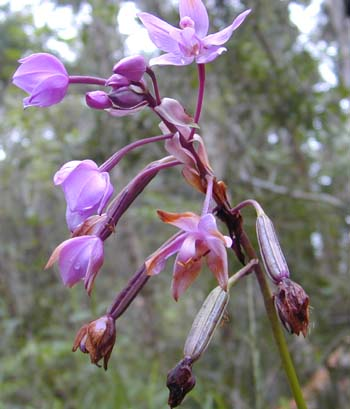
The inflorescence of Spathoglottis plicata, a terrestrial orchid, is a typical raceme

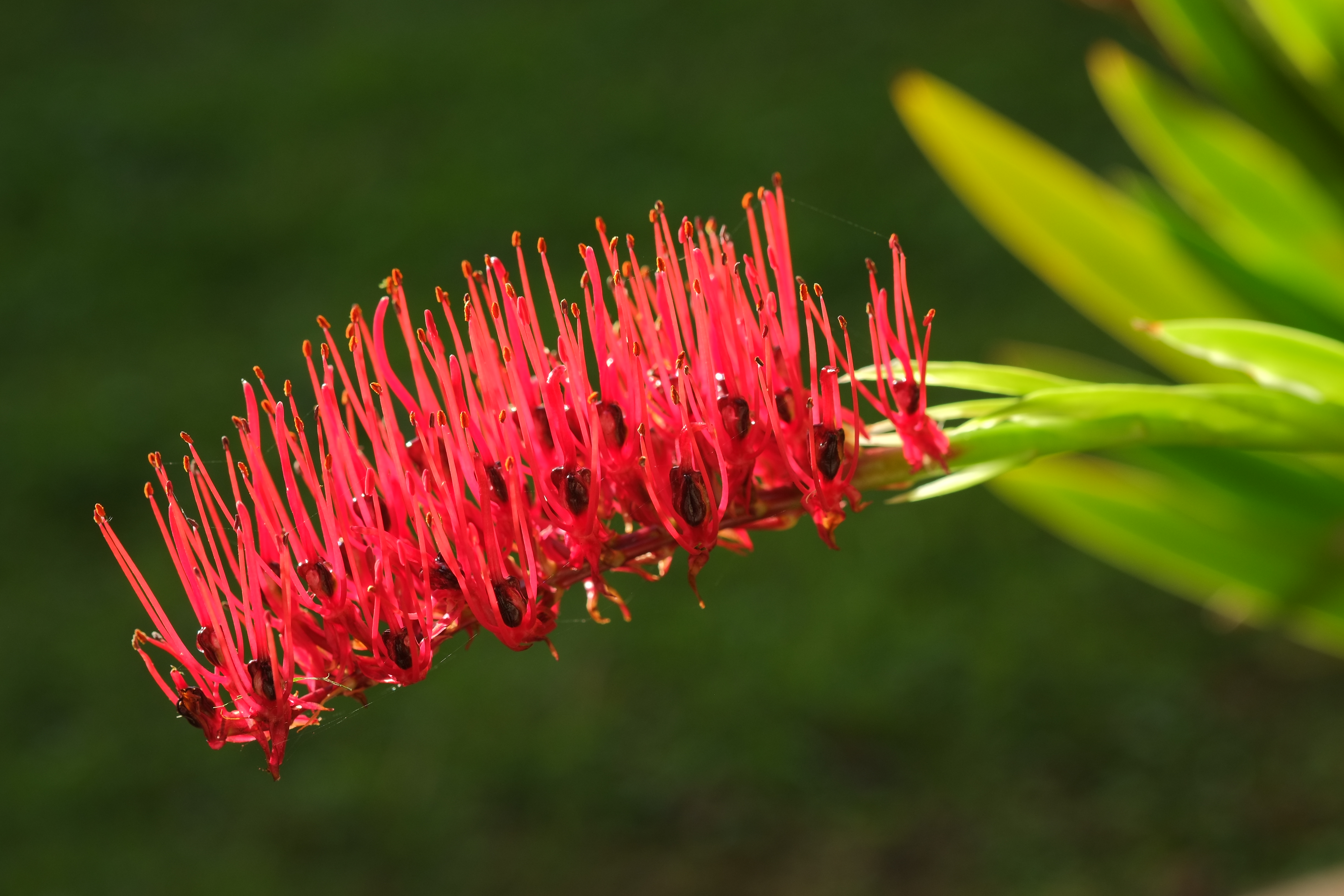
Tightly packed raceme of Xeronema callistemon, with prominent red stamens

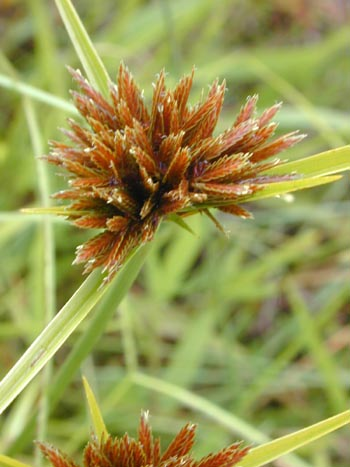
Every radiating unit in this inflorescence of a Cyperus sedge is a spikelet composed of small flowers (florets) arranged in two ranks

== Etymology ==
From classical Latin, a racemus is a cluster of grapes.

== See also ==
- Inflorescence
- Glossary of botanical terms
