= Brooksia berneri =

Scientific classification
- Kingdom: Animalia
- Phylum: Chordata
- Subphylum: Tunicata
- Class: Thaliacea
- Order: Salpida
- Family: Salpidae
- Genus: Brooksia
- Species: B. berneri

Binomial name
- Brooksia berneri van Soest, 1975

Species of tunicate

Brooksia berneri is a species of Salpida in the family Salpidae.
