= Coscinodiscus elegans =

Scientific classification
- Domain: Eukaryota
- Clade: Diaphoretickes
- Clade: Sar
- Clade: Stramenopiles
- Phylum: Ochrophyta
- Clade: Diatomeae
- Class: Bacillariophyceae
- Order: Coscinodiscales
- Family: Coscinodiscaceae
- Genus: Coscinodiscus
- Species: C. elegans

Binomial name
- Coscinodiscus elegans Greville 1866

Varieties
- Coscinodiscus elegans var. inermis (Pantocsek) F.Fricke; Coscinodiscus elegans var. minutus H.Okuno; Coscinodiscus elegans var. parvipunctata A.Truan y Luard & O.N.Witt; Coscinodiscus elegans var. spinifera Grove & G.Sturt

Species of single-celled organism

Coscinodiscus elegans is a species of diatom in the family Coscinodiscaceae. It is found in the Gulf of Mexico.
