= Brooksia rostrata =

Scientific classification
- Kingdom: Animalia
- Phylum: Chordata
- Subphylum: Tunicata
- Class: Thaliacea
- Order: Salpida
- Family: Salpidae
- Genus: Brooksia
- Species: B. rostrata

Binomial name
- Brooksia rostrata (Traustedt, 1893)

Species of tunicate

Brooksia rostrata is a species of Salpida in the family Salpidae.
