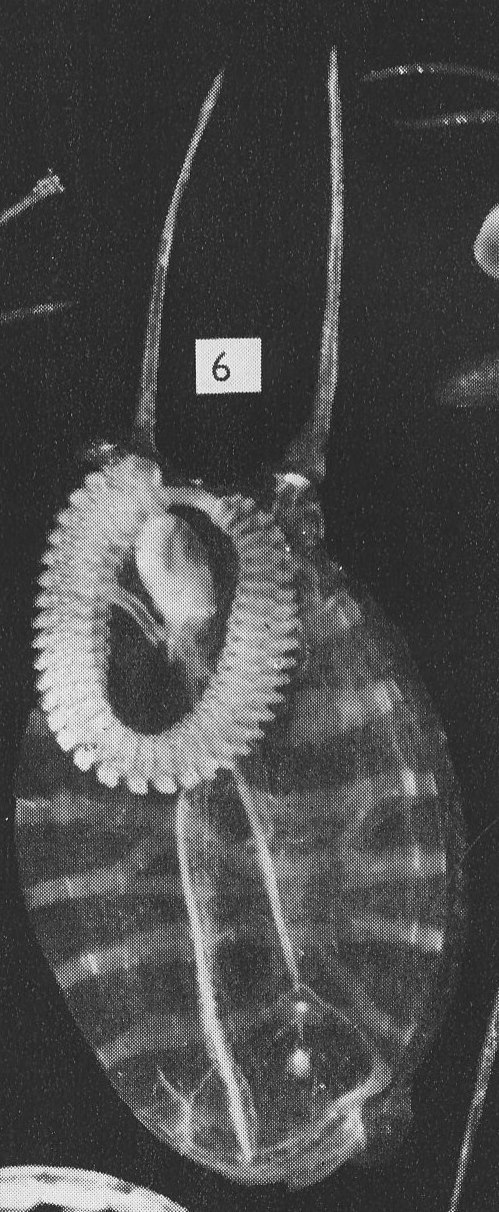
- Thalia democratica

Scientific classification
- Domain: Eukaryota
- Kingdom: Animalia
- Phylum: Chordata
- Subphylum: Tunicata
- Class: Thaliacea
- Order: Salpida
- Family: Salpidae
- Subfamily: Salpinae
- Genus: Thalia; Blumenbach, 1798

= Thalia (tunicate) =

Genus of tunicates

Thalia is a genus of tunicates belonging to the family Salpidae.

The genus has almost cosmopolitan distribution.

Species:

- Thalia cicar van Soest, 1973
- Thalia democratica (Forskål, 1775)
- Thalia longicauda (Quoy & Gaimard, 1824)
- Thalia orientalis Tokioka, 1937
- Thalia rhinoceros van Soest, 1975
- Thalia rhomboides (Quoy & Gaimard, 1824)
- Thalia sibogae van Soest, 1973

Sperm and egg interaction has been studied to discover if there are any shared features with other marine invertebrates. It was found that they are closely related to Ascidians and supports the idea that Ascidians gave rise to them.
