= Ihlea =

Scientific classification
- Domain: Eukaryota
- Kingdom: Animalia
- Phylum: Chordata
- Subphylum: Tunicata
- Class: Thaliacea
- Order: Salpida
- Family: Salpidae
- Subfamily: Salpinae
- Genus: Ihlea; Metcalf, 1919

Genus of tunicates

Ihlea is a genus of tunicates belonging to the family Salpidae.

The species of this genus are found in America, Australia, Antarctica.

Species:

- Ihlea magalhanica (Apstein, 1894)
- Ihlea punctata (Forskål, 1775)
- Ihlea racovitzai (Van Beneden & Selys Longchamp, 1913)
