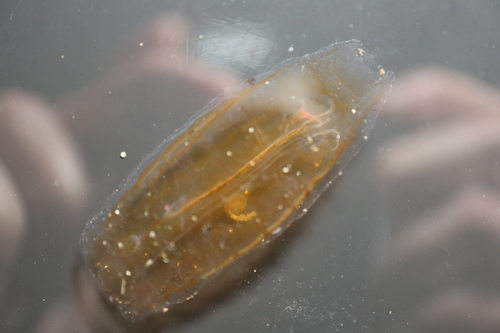

Scientific classification
- Domain: Eukaryota
- Kingdom: Animalia
- Phylum: Chordata
- Subphylum: Tunicata
- Class: Thaliacea
- Order: Salpida
- Family: Salpidae
- Genus: Cyclosalpa
- Species: C. bakeri

Binomial name
- Cyclosalpa bakeri Ritter, 1905

= Cyclosalpa bakeri =

Species of tunicate

Cyclosalpa bakeri is a salp, a marine tunicate in the class Thaliacea. It is found floating in the open sea in the Indo-Pacific region.

== Description ==
Like other salps, Cyclosalpa bakeri has two different phases. In one of these forms, individuals live a solitary life. They are cylindrical, transparent, gelatinous animals with a rather flabby test, growing to about 15 cm (6ins) long. There are openings at the anterior and posterior ends of the cylinder which can be opened or closed as needed. The bodies have seven transverse bands of muscle interspersed by white, translucent patches. A stolon grows from near the endostyle (an elongated glandular structure producing mucus for trapping food particles). The stolon is a ribbon-like organ on which a batch of aggregate forms of the animal are produced by budding. The aggregate is the second, colonial form of the salp and is also gelatinous, transparent and flabby. It takes the shape of a radial whorl of individuals up to about 20 cm (4 in) in diameter. It is formed of approximately 12 zooids linked side by side in a shape that resembles a crown.

== Distribution ==
Cyclosalpa bakeri has an Indo-Pacific distribution. Its range includes tropical and temperate waters and extends as far north as Alaska.

== Biology ==
Cyclosalpa bakeri moves by contracting its bands of muscles rhythmically at the same time opening and closing the front and rear openings appropriately. This squeezes water out from the hollow interior and the animal moves in the opposite direction, a form of jet propulsion. This water movement brings in suspended phytoplankton which are caught by a mucus net. Cyclosalpa bakeri is an extremely efficient feeder. The aggregates can grow by a quarter of their size each day and individuals can eat more than half their body mass daily.

Individuals within the aggregate are sequential hermaphrodites. They usually start life as females but later develop into males. Eggs are produced by the females and are fertilised by sperm from another aggregate. There is no larval form and a single embryo develops in each individual in the aggregate. This later becomes detached from the aggregate and becomes a solitary individual ready to undergo asexual reproduction by budding again. The animal's rapid growth and this alternation of generations means that the population can build up rapidly when there is a plentiful food supply such as a bloom of phytoplankton. The salps themselves are eaten by fish, turtles, birds, jellyfish, heteropods, siphonophores and ctenophores.
