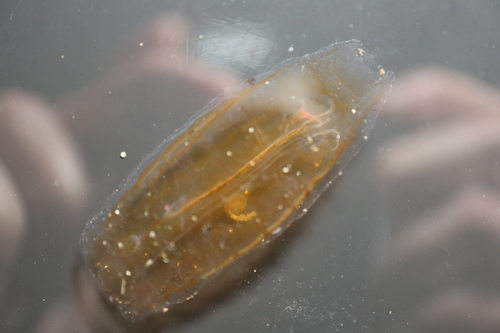
- Cyclosalpa bakeri

Scientific classification
- Kingdom: Animalia
- Phylum: Chordata
- Subphylum: Tunicata
- Class: Thaliacea
- Order: Salpida
- Family: Salpidae
- Subfamily: Cyclosalpinae
- Genus: Cyclosalpa de Blainville, 1827

Species
- Cyclosalpa affinis (Chamisso, 1819); Cyclosalpa bakeri Ritter, 1905; Cyclosalpa danae van Soest, 1975; Cyclosalpa floridana (Apstein, 1894); Cyclosalpa foxtoni van Soest, 1974; Cyclosalpa ihlei van Soest, 1974; Cyclosalpa pinnata (Forskål, 1775); Cyclosalpa polae Sigl, 1912; Cyclosalpa quadriluminis Berner, 1955; Cyclosalpa sewelli Metcalf, 1927; Cyclosalpa strongylenteron Berner, 1955

Synonyms
- Orthocoela Macdonald, 1864; Pyrosomopsis Macdonald, 1864; Salpa (Cyclosalpa) Blainville, 1827

= Cyclosalpa =

Genus of tunicates

Cyclosalpa is a genus of salps, marine tunicates in the class Thaliacea.
