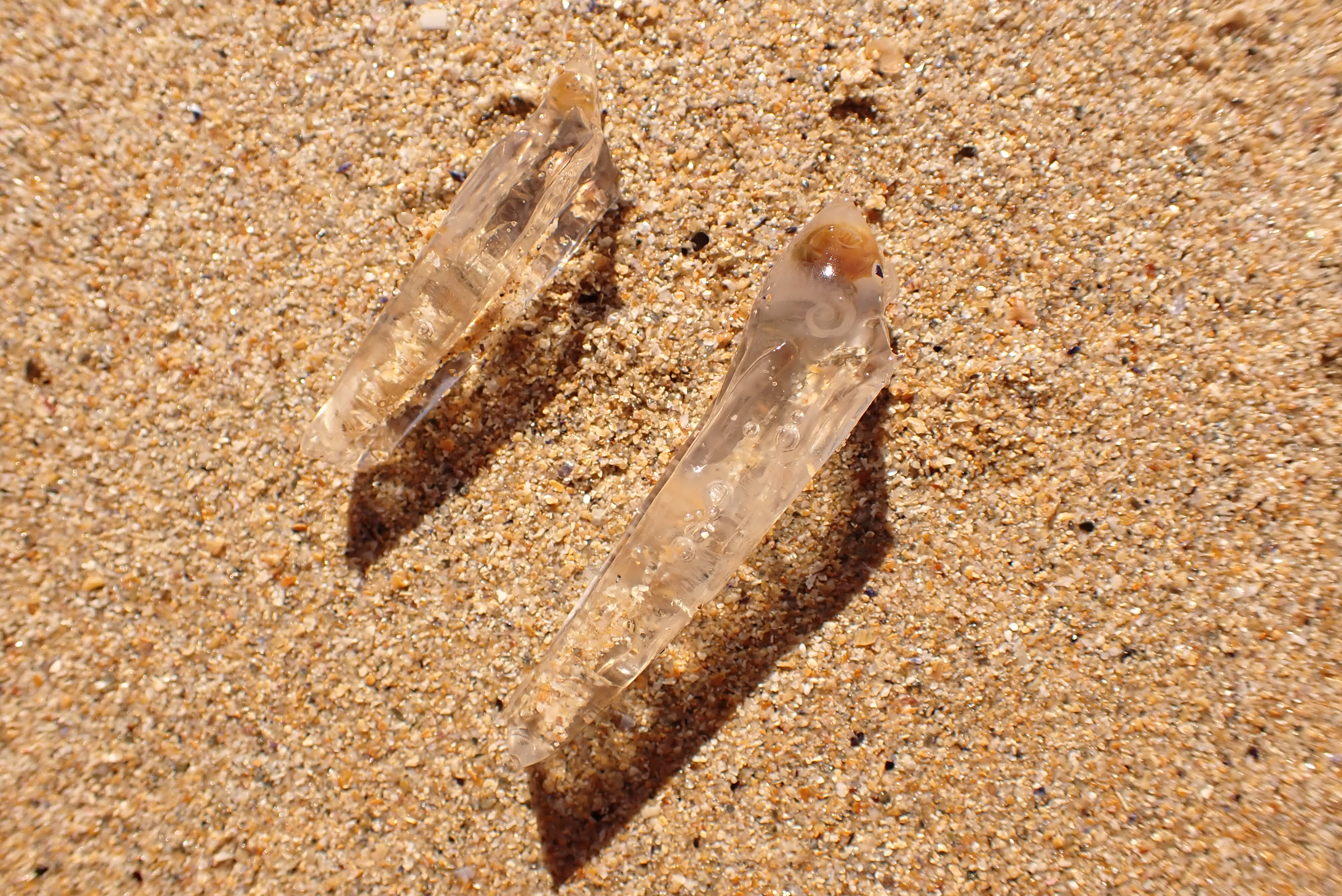
- Soestia zonaria

Scientific classification
- Domain: Eukaryota
- Kingdom: Animalia
- Phylum: Chordata
- Subphylum: Tunicata
- Class: Thaliacea
- Order: Salpida
- Family: Salpidae
- Genus: Soestia; Kott, 1998
- Species: S. zonaria

Binomial name
- Soestia zonaria (Pallas, 1774)

= Soestia =

Monotypic genus of tunicates

Soestia is a monotypic genus of tunicates belonging to the family Salpidae. The genus was described by Patricia Kott in 1998. The only species is Soestia zonaria, which was first described in 1774 by Peter Simon Pallas as Holothurium zonarium.

The species has cosmopolitan distribution.
