= Craspedodiscus (diatom) =

Scientific classification
- Domain: Eukaryota
- Clade: Diaphoretickes
- Clade: SAR
- Clade: Stramenopiles
- Phylum: Gyrista
- Subphylum: Ochrophytina
- Class: Bacillariophyceae
- Order: Coscinodiscales
- Family: Coscinodiscaceae
- Genus: Craspedodiscus; Ehrenberg, 1844

Type species
- Craspedodiscus elegans Ehrenberg, 1844

Genus of single-celled organisms

Craspedodiscus is a genus of diatoms in the family Coscinodiscaceae.
