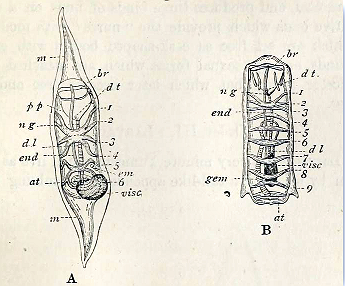
- 1804 illustration by Georges Cuvier of Salpa fusiformis anatomy: A chain form; B solitary form; 1-9 : muscle bands; em - embryo; m - mantle; visc - visceral mass or nucleus

Scientific classification
- Kingdom: Animalia
- Phylum: Chordata
- Subphylum: Tunicata
- Class: Thaliacea
- Order: Salpida
- Family: Salpidae
- Genus: Salpa
- Species: S. fusiformis

Binomial name
- Salpa fusiformis Cuvier, 1804

Synonyms
- Biphora depressa Sars, 1829; Biphora tricuspidata Sars, 1829; Salpa clostra Milne-Edwards, 1828; Salpa coerulea Quoy & Gaimard, 1834; Salpa emarginata Quoy & Gaimard, 1824; Salpa moniliformis Macculloch, 1819; Salpa pyramidalis Lesson, 1832; Salpa runcinata Chamisso, 1819; Salpa tricuspidata Sars, 1829

= Salpa fusiformis =

Species of tunicate

Salpa fusiformis, sometimes known as the common salp, is the most widespread species of salp. They have a cosmopolitan distribution, and can be found at depths of 0 to 800 m (0 to 2,625 ft). They exhibit diel vertical migration, moving closer to the surface at night. They can occur in very dense swarms, as solitary zooids or as colonies. Solitary zooids usually measure 22 to 52 mm (0.87 to 2.05 in) in length. They are barrel-shaped and elongated, with a rounded front and a flat rear. Aggregate zooids are 7 to 52 mm (0.28 to 2.05 in) in length individually (excluding projections). They are usually barrel or spindle-shaped.

== Economic effects ==
The incursion of a large number of Salpa fusiformis into the North Sea in 1920 led to a failure of the Scottish herring fishery.
