= Archway Island (Kawau Island) =

Island in New Zealand

- Interactive map of Archway Island

Geography
- Location: Hauraki Gulf
- Coordinates: 36°27′03″S 174°50′11″E
- Area: 0.2 ha (0.49 acres)
- Length: 50 m (160 ft)
- Width: 40 m (130 ft)

Administration
- New Zealand
- Region: Auckland

Demographics
- Population: uninhabited

Archway Island is an island in the Auckland Region of New Zealand. It lies to the south west of Kawau Island.
