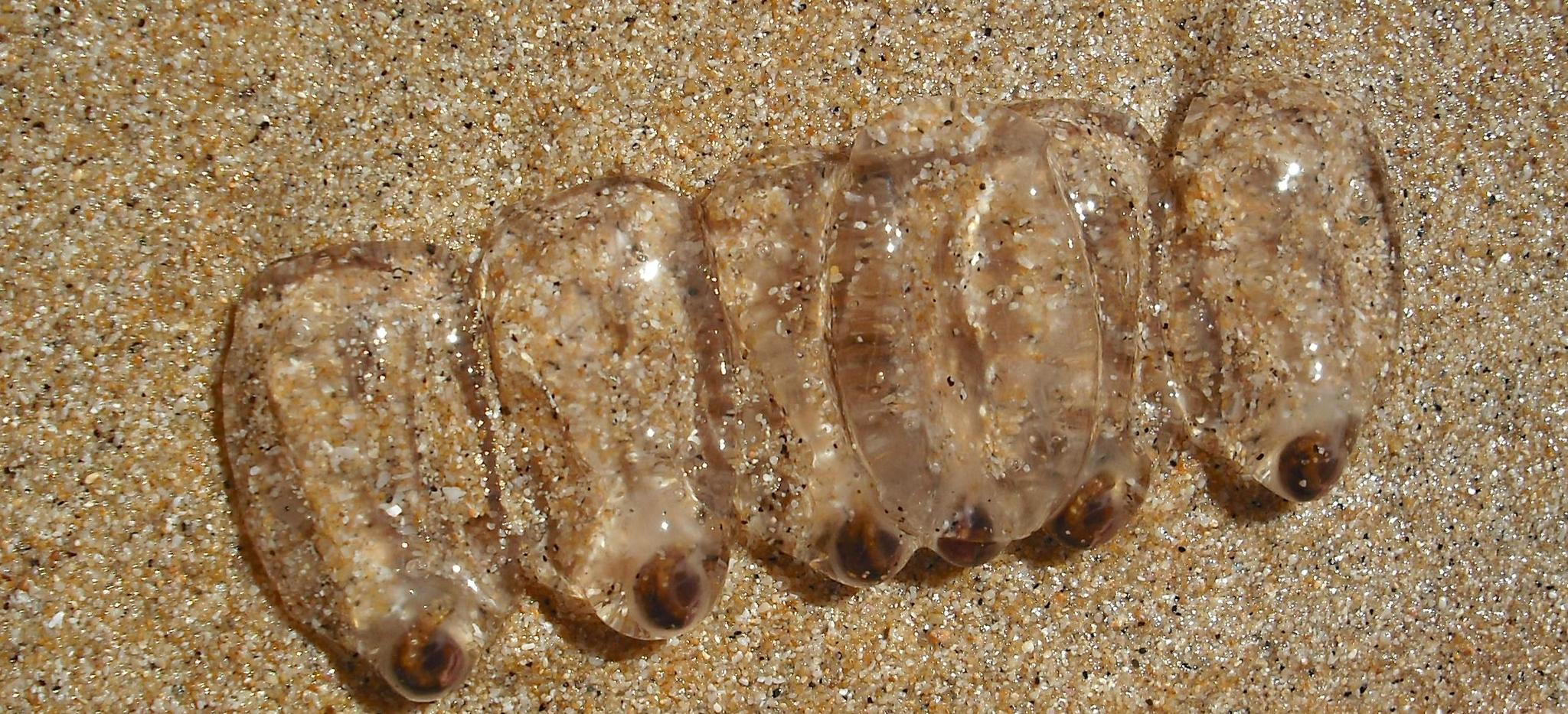
- Pegea confoederata

Scientific classification
- Kingdom: Animalia
- Phylum: Chordata
- Subphylum: Tunicata
- Class: Thaliacea
- Order: Salpida
- Family: Salpidae
- Subfamily: Salpinae
- Genus: Pegea; Savigny, 1816

= Pegea =

Genus of tunicates

Pegea is a genus of tunicates belonging to the family Salpidae.

The genus has almost cosmopolitan distribution.

Species:

- Pegea bicaudata (Quoy & Gaimard, 1826)
- Pegea confoederata (Forskål, 1775)
- Pegea socia (Bosc, 1802)
