= Archway Island (Poor Knights Islands) =

Island in New Zealand

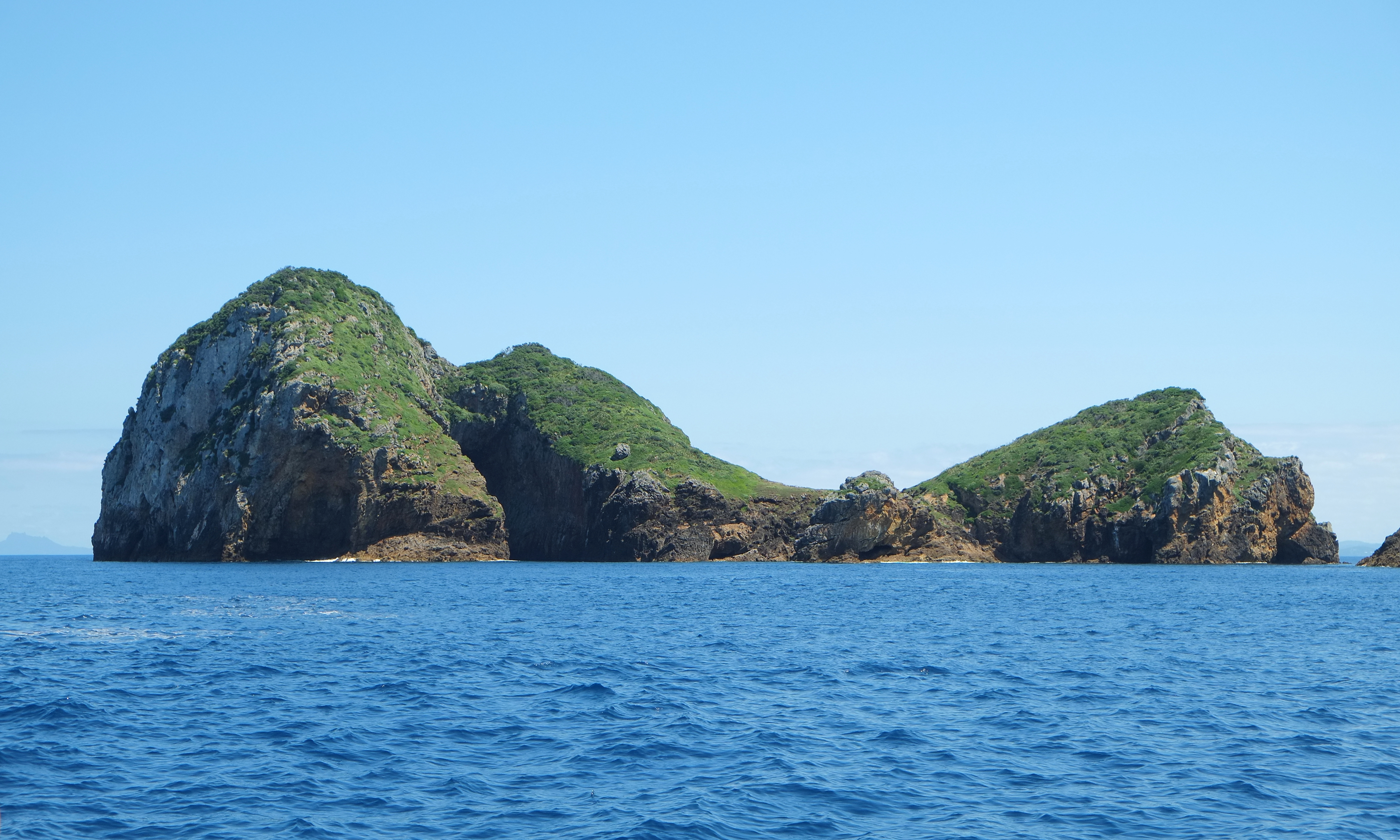

Geography
- Coordinates: 35.490314°S 174.7406°E

Administration
- New Zealand
- Region: Northland

Demographics
- Population: uninhabited

Archway Island is an island in the Northland Region of New Zealand. It lies on the south part of the Poor Knights Islands.
