= Brooksia =

Brooksia is the scientific name of two genera of organisms and may refer to:

- Brooksia (fungus), a genus of fungi in the class Dothideomycetes
- Brooksia (tunicate), a genus of animals in the family Salpidae

== See also ==
- Brookesia
