= Salpa (tunicate) =

Scientific classification
- Kingdom: Animalia
- Phylum: Chordata
- Subphylum: Tunicata
- Class: Thaliacea
- Order: Salpida
- Family: Salpidae
- Subfamily: Salpinae
- Genus: Salpa; Forskål, 1775

Type species
- Salpa maxima Forskål, 1775

Synonyms
- Biphora Bruguière, 1789; Dagysa Banks & Solander, 1773

Genus of tunicates

Salpa is a genus of tunicates belonging to the family Salpidae.

The genus has cosmopolitan distribution.

== Species ==
The genus Salpa includes the following species:

- Salpa amphoraeformis Lesson, 1832
- Salpa antarctica Meyen, 1832
- Salpa antheliphora Péron & Lesueur, 1807
- Salpa aspera Chamisso, 1819
- Salpa fusiformis Cuvier, 1804
- Salpa maxima Forskål, 1775
- Salpa thompsoni Foxton, 1961
- Salpa tuberculata Metcalf, 1918
- Salpa younti van Soest, 1973
