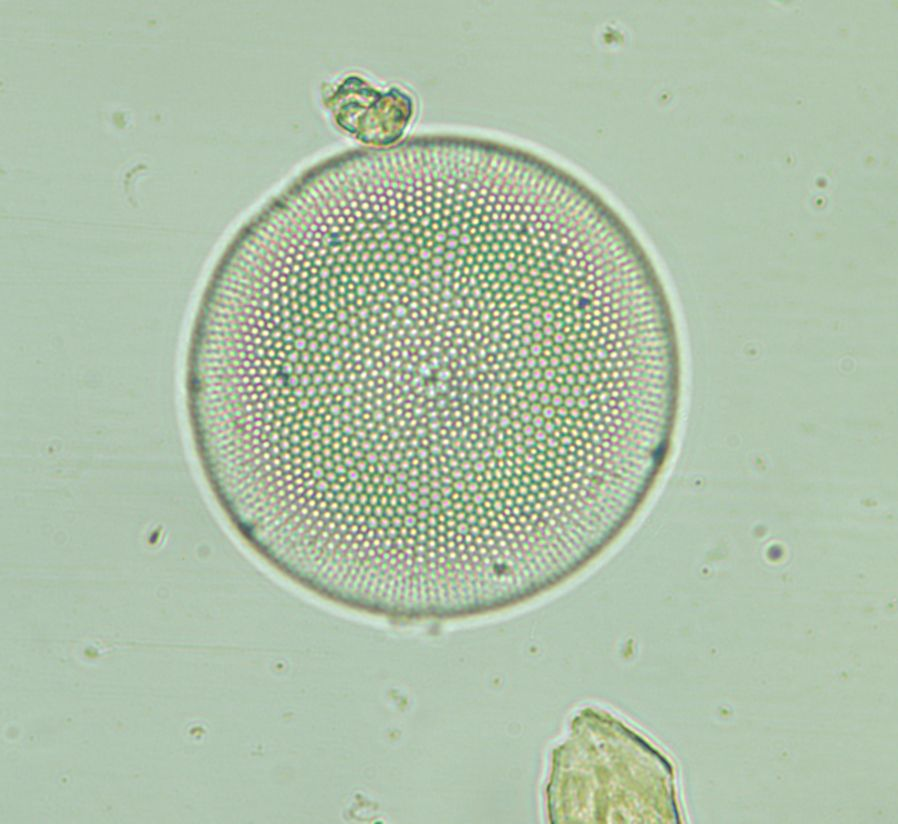
- Coscinodiscus radiatus

Scientific classification
- Domain: Eukaryota
- Clade: Sar
- Clade: Stramenopiles
- Division: Ochrophyta
- Clade: Bacillariophyta
- Class: Coscinodiscophyceae
- Order: Coscinodiscales
- Family: Coscinodiscaceae
- Genus: Coscinodiscus; Ehrenberg, 1839

Species
- Many, see text

= Coscinodiscus =

Genus of single-celled organisms

Coscinodiscus is a genus of centric diatoms in the family Coscinodiscaceae. It is the type genus of its family. There are over 200 species of Coscinodiscus. Coscinodiscus argus Ehrenberg 1839 is the type species of this genus.

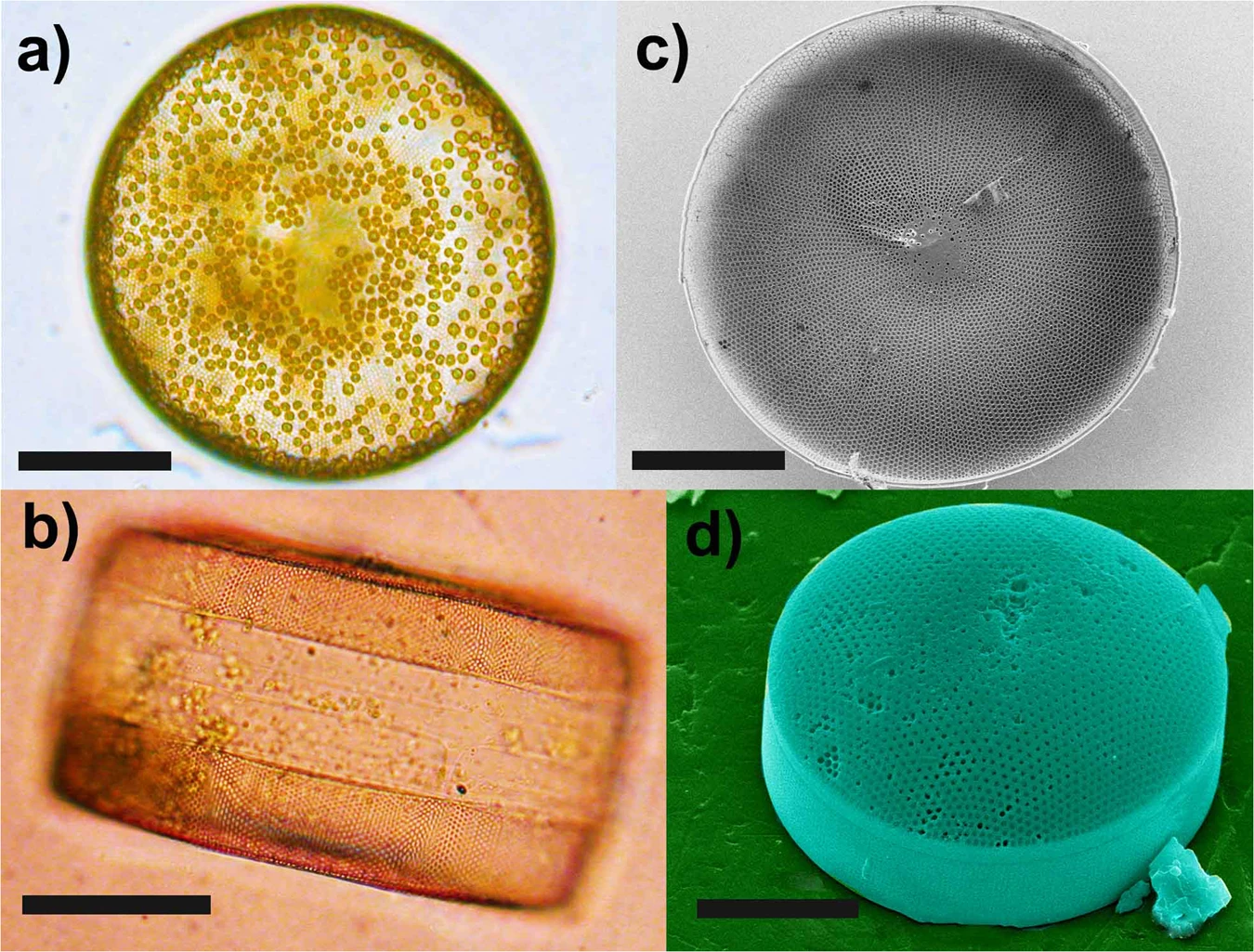
Views of the centric diatom Coscinodiscus wailesii Light micrographs of a living cell in face view (a) and side view (b); many small discoid chloroplasts are visible. FESEM micrographs of a cleaned single valve, inner view (c) and outer view of a complete theca (d). Scale bars: 50 μm.

Species
Coscinodiscus actinocycloides - Coscinodiscus actinocycloides - Coscinodiscus actinocyclus - Coscinodiscus actinoptychus - Coscinodiscus actinosus - Coscinodiscus aeginensis - Coscinodiscus aethes - Coscinodiscus agapetos - Coscinodiscus alboranii - Coscinodiscus alienus - Coscinodiscus alpha - Coscinodiscus amplus - Coscinodiscus anastomosans - Coscinodiscus anastomosans - Coscinodiscus angstii - Coscinodiscus angulatus - Coscinodiscus angulosus - Coscinodiscus annulatus - Coscinodiscus anomalus - Coscinodiscus antarcticus - Coscinodiscus antediluvianus - Coscinodiscus antimimos - Coscinodiscus antiquus - Coscinodiscus apages - Coscinodiscus aphrastos - Coscinodiscus apiculatus - Coscinodiscus apiculiferus - Coscinodiscus apollinis - Coscinodiscus arafuraensis - Coscinodiscus aralensis - Coscinodiscus aralocaspicus - Coscinodiscus arentii - Coscinodiscus argus - Coscinodiscus armatus - Coscinodiscus armatus - Coscinodiscus asonumaae - Coscinodiscus asperulus - Coscinodiscus asteroides - Coscinodiscus asteromphalus - Coscinodiscus asymmetricus - Coscinodiscus asymmetricus - Coscinodiscus atlanticus - Coscinodiscus auliscus - Coscinodiscus australiensis - Coscinodiscus australis - Coscinodiscus baicalensis - Coscinodiscus baileyi - Coscinodiscus barbadensis - Coscinodiscus barkeri - Coscinodiscus barklyi - Coscinodiscus beaufortianus - Coscinodiscus belgicae - Coscinodiscus bellum - Coscinodiscus bergii - Coscinodiscus beta - Coscinodiscus biangulatus - Coscinodiscus biconfusus - Coscinodiscus bifrons - Coscinodiscus biharensis - Coscinodiscus binoculus - Coscinodiscus biradiatus - Coscinodiscus bisculptus - Coscinodiscus bisinuatus - Coscinodiscus bisulcatus - Coscinodiscus blandus - Coscinodiscus boeckhii - Coscinodiscus boeckii - Coscinodiscus boulei - Coscinodiscus bouvet - Coscinodiscus bractea - Coscinodiscus brasiliensis - Coscinodiscus bremianus - Coscinodiscus brockmannii - Coscinodiscus brunii - Coscinodiscus bulla - Coscinodiscus bullatus - Coscinodiscus bulliens - Coscinodiscus caballeroi - Coscinodiscus californicus - Coscinodiscus callosus - Coscinodiscus cameratus - Coscinodiscus capensis - Coscinodiscus caraibicus - Coscinodiscus caspius - Coscinodiscus castracanei - Coscinodiscus castracanei - Coscinodiscus castracanei - Coscinodiscus caudatus - Coscinodiscus centralis - Coscinodiscus centranthus - Coscinodiscus centroaculeatus - Coscinodiscus centrolineatus - Coscinodiscus cervinus - Coscinodiscus challengeri - Coscinodiscus chambonis - Coscinodiscus charcotii - Coscinodiscus chromoradiatus - Coscinodiscus ciliatus - Coscinodiscus cinctus - Coscinodiscus cingulatus - Coscinodiscus circumdatus - Coscinodiscus circumscriptus - Coscinodiscus circumspectus - Coscinodiscus cirrus - Coscinodiscus cladiscophorus - Coscinodiscus clarescens - Coscinodiscus clivosus - Coscinodiscus clypeus - Coscinodiscus commutatus - Coscinodiscus compositus - Coscinodiscus compressus - Coscinodiscus comptus - Coscinodiscus concavus - Coscinodiscus concentricus - Coscinodiscus concinniformis - Coscinodiscus concinnoideas - Coscinodiscus concinnus - Coscinodiscus conclusus - Coscinodiscus condensatus - Coscinodiscus confertus - Coscinodiscus conformis - Coscinodiscus confusus - Coscinodiscus contendens - Coscinodiscus convergens - Coscinodiscus convexus - Coscinodiscus cornutus - Coscinodiscus cornutus - Coscinodiscus corolla - Coscinodiscus costatus - Coscinodiscus crassus - Coscinodiscus cribrosus - Coscinodiscus cristatus - Coscinodiscus cruciatus - Coscinodiscus cum-placenta - Coscinodiscus cuneistriatus - Coscinodiscus curvatulus - Coscinodiscus cyaneus - Coscinodiscus cycloteres - Coscinodiscus cylindricus - Coscinodiscus debilis - Coscinodiscus debyii - Coscinodiscus decoratus - Coscinodiscus decrescenoides - Coscinodiscus decrescens - Coscinodiscus decussatus - Coscinodiscus decussatus - Coscinodiscus definitus - Coscinodiscus deformans - Coscinodiscus deformatus - Coscinodiscus deformatus - Coscinodiscus delawarensis - Coscinodiscus delta - Coscinodiscus demergitus - Coscinodiscus denarius - Coscinodiscus denarius - Coscinodiscus densus - Coscinodiscus denticulatus - Coscinodiscus depressus - Coscinodiscus detritus - Coscinodiscus devius - Coscinodiscus dichotomus - Coscinodiscus difficilis - Coscinodiscus dimorphus - Coscinodiscus diophthalmus - Coscinodiscus diorama - Coscinodiscus disciger - Coscinodiscus discoplea - Coscinodiscus dispar - Coscinodiscus dispersepunctatus - Coscinodiscus dissoniformis - Coscinodiscus dissonus - Coscinodiscus distinctus - Coscinodiscus diversus - Coscinodiscus doljensis - Coscinodiscus domifactus - Coscinodiscus dubiosus - Coscinodiscus dubius - Coscinodiscus duplex - Coscinodiscus duplex - Coscinodiscus duriusculus - Coscinodiscus echinatus - Coscinodiscus egregius - Coscinodiscus elegans - Coscinodiscus elegantulus - Coscinodiscus ellipticus - Coscinodiscus ellipticus - Coscinodiscus elongatus - Coscinodiscus endoi - Coscinodiscus entoleion - Coscinodiscus epiphanes - Coscinodiscus eta - Coscinodiscus euryomma - Coscinodiscus evadens - Coscinodiscus evermanni - Coscinodiscus exasperans - Coscinodiscus excavatus - Coscinodiscus exceptus - Coscinodiscus exiguus - Coscinodiscus expectus - Coscinodiscus extravagans - Coscinodiscus exutus - Coscinodiscus fanischii - Coscinodiscus fasciatus - Coscinodiscus favorabilis - Coscinodiscus fenestratus - Coscinodiscus filiformis - Coscinodiscus fimbriatus - Coscinodiscus finicus - Coscinodiscus flabellatus - Coscinodiscus flagrans - Coscinodiscus flavicans - Coscinodiscus flexilis - Coscinodiscus flexuosus - Coscinodiscus florescens - Coscinodiscus floridulus - Coscinodiscus foraminosus - Coscinodiscus fragilissimus - Coscinodiscus frigidus - Coscinodiscus fulguralis - Coscinodiscus gainii - Coscinodiscus galapagensis - Coscinodiscus galapagensis - Coscinodiscus gamma - Coscinodiscus gelatinosus - Coscinodiscus gemmifer - Coscinodiscus gemmulatus - Coscinodiscus gerlachii - Coscinodiscus gerthi - Coscinodiscus gigas - Coscinodiscus glaberrimus - Coscinodiscus globosus - Coscinodiscus gracilentus - Coscinodiscus graecus - Coscinodiscus graecus - Coscinodiscus grandenucleatus - Coscinodiscus grandineus - Coscinodiscus granii - Coscinodiscus granulatus - Coscinodiscus gravidus - Coscinodiscus grayianus - Coscinodiscus gregorianus - Coscinodiscus gregorii - Coscinodiscus griseus - Coscinodiscus grossheimii - Coscinodiscus groveanus - Coscinodiscus grunowii - Coscinodiscus guineensis - Coscinodiscus guineensis - Coscinodiscus gyratus - Coscinodiscus hainanensis - Coscinodiscus hajosiae - Coscinodiscus haradaae - Coscinodiscus heliozoides - Coscinodiscus hertleini - Coscinodiscus heteromorphus - Coscinodiscus heteroporus - Coscinodiscus heterostigma - Coscinodiscus hexagonalis - Coscinodiscus hirosakiensis - Coscinodiscus hirtulus - Coscinodiscus hispidulus - Coscinodiscus hokkaidoensis - Coscinodiscus horridus - Coscinodiscus humilis - Coscinodiscus hungaricus - Coscinodiscus hustedtii - Coscinodiscus ildicoi - Coscinodiscus imbertii - Coscinodiscus immaculatus - Coscinodiscus immaculatus - Coscinodiscus imperator - Coscinodiscus implicatus - Coscinodiscus impolitus - Coscinodiscus inaequalis - Coscinodiscus inaequisculptus - Coscinodiscus incertus - Coscinodiscus incertus - Coscinodiscus inclusus - Coscinodiscus incompositus - Coscinodiscus incomptus - Coscinodiscus increscens - Coscinodiscus incretus - Coscinodiscus indicus - Coscinodiscus indistinctus - Coscinodiscus inexpectatus - Coscinodiscus inordinatus - Coscinodiscus inornatus - Coscinodiscus inscriptus - Coscinodiscus insulindicus - Coscinodiscus insutus - Coscinodiscus interlineatus - Coscinodiscus intermedius - Coscinodiscus intermittens - Coscinodiscus intermixtus - Coscinodiscus intersectus - Coscinodiscus intramarginatus - Coscinodiscus intumescens - Coscinodiscus irradiatus - Coscinodiscus irregularis - Coscinodiscus isoporus - Coscinodiscus jambori - Coscinodiscus janischii - Coscinodiscus janus - Coscinodiscus japonicus - Coscinodiscus japonicus - Coscinodiscus javanensis - Coscinodiscus jeremianus - Coscinodiscus jimboi - Coscinodiscus joergensenii - Coscinodiscus johnsonianus - Coscinodiscus jonesianus - Coscinodiscus josefinus - Coscinodiscus karstenii - Coscinodiscus karstenii - Coscinodiscus karstenii - Coscinodiscus kerguelensis - Coscinodiscus keutzingii - Coscinodiscus kinkerianus - Coscinodiscus kochii - Coscinodiscus kolbei - Coscinodiscus kruizingai - Coscinodiscus kryophilus - Coscinodiscus kurzii - Coscinodiscus kusnetzkianus - Coscinodiscus kutzingiana - Coscinodiscus labyrinthus - Coscinodiscus lactucae-patella - Coscinodiscus lacunosis - Coscinodiscus lacunosus - Coscinodiscus lacustris - Coscinodiscus laevis - Coscinodiscus lanceolatum - Coscinodiscus lanceolatus - Coscinodiscus layrinthus - Coscinodiscus levanderi - Coscinodiscus lineolatus - Coscinodiscus liocentrum - Coscinodiscus litos - Coscinodiscus lobatus - Coscinodiscus lobatus - Coscinodiscus lohmanites - Coscinodiscus longi - Coscinodiscus longispinus - Coscinodiscus luctuosus - Coscinodiscus ludovicianus - Coscinodiscus lunae - Coscinodiscus lunatus - Coscinodiscus lutescens - Coscinodiscus luxuriosus - Coscinodiscus m?rtonfii - Coscinodiscus macraeanus - Coscinodiscus maculosus - Coscinodiscus margaritaceus - Coscinodiscus marginato-lineatus - Coscinodiscus marginatus - Coscinodiscus marylandicus - Coscinodiscus masoni - Coscinodiscus matraensis - Coscinodiscus mecsekensis - Coscinodiscus mediatus - Coscinodiscus medosus - Coscinodiscus megacentrum - Coscinodiscus megacoccus - Coscinodiscus megalomma - Coscinodiscus megaporus - Coscinodiscus mesacmaeus - Coscinodiscus mesodictyon - Coscinodiscus micans - Coscinodiscus microcentrum - Coscinodiscus miminus - Coscinodiscus minor - Coscinodiscus minuens - Coscinodiscus minutellus - Coscinodiscus minutifasciculatus - Coscinodiscus minutiosus - Coscinodiscus minutus - Coscinodiscus miocaenicus - Coscinodiscus miocenicus - Coscinodiscus mirabilis - Coscinodiscus mirificus - Coscinodiscus modestus - Coscinodiscus moelleri - Coscinodiscus moholensis - Coscinodiscus monicae - Coscinodiscus moniliformis - Coscinodiscus monodon - Coscinodiscus moravicus - Coscinodiscus moronensis - Coscinodiscus morsianus - Coscinodiscus moseleyi - Coscinodiscus mossianus - Coscinodiscus mutabilis - Coscinodiscus nankoorensis - Coscinodiscus nano-lineatus - Coscinodiscus naviculoides - Coscinodiscus nebula - Coscinodiscus neglectus - Coscinodiscus neogradensis - Coscinodiscus neoradiatus - Coscinodiscus nitidulus - Coscinodiscus nitidus - Coscinodiscus nobilis - Coscinodiscus nodatus - Coscinodiscus non-scriptus - Coscinodiscus nordenskioldii - Coscinodiscus normanianus - Coscinodiscus normannicus - Coscinodiscus norwegicus - Coscinodiscus notabilis - Coscinodiscus novozelandicus - Coscinodiscus oamaruensis - Coscinodiscus obliquus - Coscinodiscus oblongus - Coscinodiscus obnubilus - Coscinodiscus obovatus - Coscinodiscus obovatus - Coscinodiscus obscurus - Coscinodiscus obversus - Coscinodiscus oceanicus - Coscinodiscus oculoides - Coscinodiscus odontodiscus - Coscinodiscus odontophorus - Coscinodiscus oestrupii - Coscinodiscus okamurae - Coscinodiscus okunoi - Coscinodiscus oligocenicus - Coscinodiscus omphalanthus - Coscinodiscus oppositus - Coscinodiscus oruetae - Coscinodiscus ovalis - Coscinodiscus ovicentrum - Coscinodiscus pacificus - Coscinodiscus pacificus - Coscinodiscus paleaceus - Coscinodiscus pantocsekii - Coscinodiscus pantocsekites - Coscinodiscus papillosus - Coscinodiscus papuanus - Coscinodiscus papulosus - Coscinodiscus partitus - Coscinodiscus parvulus - Coscinodiscus parvus - Coscinodiscus parvus - Coscinodiscus patellaeformis - Coscinodiscus patera - Coscinodiscus patina - Coscinodiscus pauper - Coscinodiscus pavillardii - Coscinodiscus payeri - Coscinodiscus pectinatus - Coscinodiscus pelagicus - Coscinodiscus pellucidus - Coscinodiscus pentas - Coscinodiscus peragalloi - Coscinodiscus perforatus - Coscinodiscus perikompsos - Coscinodiscus perminutus - Coscinodiscus peruanus - Coscinodiscus pethoei - Coscinodiscus planetophorus - Coscinodiscus planithecus - Coscinodiscus planiusculus - Coscinodiscus planus - Coscinodiscus plicatoides - Coscinodiscus plicatulus - Coscinodiscus plicatus - Coscinodiscus polurrhaptos - Coscinodiscus polyactis - Coscinodiscus polycora - Coscinodiscus polygonus - Coscinodiscus polymorphus - Coscinodiscus polyradiatus - Coscinodiscus polystigma - Coscinodiscus praeclarus - Coscinodiscus praenitidus - Coscinodiscus praenodulifer - Coscinodiscus praepaleaceus - Coscinodiscus praetextus - Coscinodiscus praetor - Coscinodiscus praeyabei - Coscinodiscus princeps - Coscinodiscus problematicus - Coscinodiscus profundus - Coscinodiscus proteus - Coscinodiscus proximus - Coscinodiscus pseudanastomosans - Coscinodiscus pseudoactinocyclus - Coscinodiscus pseudonitidulus - Coscinodiscus pseudoradiolatus - Coscinodiscus pulchellus - Coscinodiscus pulchellus - Coscinodiscus pulcherrimus - Coscinodiscus pumilio - Coscinodiscus pumilus - Coscinodiscus punctatus - Coscinodiscus pusillus - Coscinodiscus pustulatus - Coscinodiscus pygmaeus - Coscinodiscus pyrenoidophorus - Coscinodiscus pyxis - Coscinodiscus quindenarius - Coscinodiscus quinquies-marcatus - Coscinodiscus radiatus - Coscinodiscus radiofurcatus - Coscinodiscus radiolatus - Coscinodiscus radiopunctatus - Coscinodiscus radiopunctatus - Coscinodiscus rectangulus - Coscinodiscus regina - Coscinodiscus relatus - Coscinodiscus reniformis - Coscinodiscus rex - Coscinodiscus rhombicus - Coscinodiscus robuoides - Coscinodiscus robustus - Coscinodiscus rothii - Coscinodiscus rotula - Coscinodiscus rotulus - Coscinodiscus rotundus - Coscinodiscus rudis - Coscinodiscus salisburyanus - Coscinodiscus sarmaticus - Coscinodiscus sawamurae - Coscinodiscus schimperi - Coscinodiscus scintillans - Coscinodiscus scitulus - Coscinodiscus secernendus - Coscinodiscus sellatus - Coscinodiscus semipennatus - Coscinodiscus senarius - Coscinodiscus senarius - Coscinodiscus septentrionalis - Coscinodiscus sexradiatus - Coscinodiscus shantouensis - Coscinodiscus sheshukovaensis - Coscinodiscus sibiricus - Coscinodiscus simbirskianus - Coscinodiscus simbirskianus - Coscinodiscus similis - Coscinodiscus simonis - Coscinodiscus sinensis - Coscinodiscus sinicus - Coscinodiscus solidus - Coscinodiscus solitarius - Coscinodiscus soloensis - Coscinodiscus sphaeroidalis - Coscinodiscus spiniferus - Coscinodiscus spinuligerus - Coscinodiscus spinulosus - Coscinodiscus spiralis - Coscinodiscus spiraliter-punctatus - Coscinodiscus splendidulus - Coscinodiscus splendidus - Coscinodiscus stefaninii - Coscinodiscus steinyi - Coscinodiscus stellaris - Coscinodiscus stellatus - Coscinodiscus stelliger - Coscinodiscus stephanopyxioides - Coscinodiscus stokesianus - Coscinodiscus stokesianus - Coscinodiscus stoschii - Coscinodiscus strigillatus - Coscinodiscus strigillatus - Coscinodiscus sub-bulliens - Coscinodiscus subangulatus - Coscinodiscus subapiculatus - Coscinodiscus subareolatus - Coscinodiscus subaulacodiscoidalis - Coscinodiscus subbulliens - Coscinodiscus subconcavus - Coscinodiscus subdivisus - Coscinodiscus subfasciculatus - Coscinodiscus subglobosus - Coscinodiscus subnitidus - Coscinodiscus subnotabilis - Coscinodiscus suboculatus - Coscinodiscus subtabulatus - Coscinodiscus subtilis - Coscinodiscus subtilissimus - Coscinodiscus subtilissimus - Coscinodiscus subtillis - Coscinodiscus subvelatus - Coscinodiscus succinctus - Coscinodiscus superbus - Coscinodiscus suspectus - Coscinodiscus symbolophoroides - Coscinodiscus symmetricus - Coscinodiscus szaboi - Coscinodiscus szont?ghii - Coscinodiscus tabulatus - Coscinodiscus temerei - Coscinodiscus temperei - Coscinodiscus tenellus - Coscinodiscus tener - Coscinodiscus tenerrimus - Coscinodiscus tenerrimus - Coscinodiscus tenuis - Coscinodiscus tenuis - Coscinodiscus tenuisculptus - Coscinodiscus tenuithecus - Coscinodiscus theskelos - Coscinodiscus theta - Coscinodiscus thorii - Coscinodiscus thumii - Coscinodiscus traducens - Coscinodiscus transjlvanicus - Coscinodiscus transversalis - Coscinodiscus trapeziformis - Coscinodiscus travertinorum - Coscinodiscus trinitatis - Coscinodiscus trochiskos - Coscinodiscus trompii - Coscinodiscus tuberculatus - Coscinodiscus tuberculatus - Coscinodiscus tubifex - Coscinodiscus tubiformis - Coscinodiscus tumulus - Coscinodiscus turgidus - Coscinodiscus umbonatus - Coscinodiscus umbonatus - Coscinodiscus undatus - Coscinodiscus undulans - Coscinodiscus undulatus - Coscinodiscus undulatus - Coscinodiscus undulosus - Coscinodiscus uralensis - Coscinodiscus vacuus - Coscinodiscus valdiviae - Coscinodiscus variabilis - Coscinodiscus varians - Coscinodiscus variolatus - Coscinodiscus varius - Coscinodiscus velatus - Coscinodiscus venulosus - Coscinodiscus verecundus - Coscinodiscus vesiculosus - Coscinodiscus vetustissimus - Coscinodiscus vicinus - Coscinodiscus victoriae - Coscinodiscus vidovichi - Coscinodiscus vigilans - Coscinodiscus volutus - Coscinodiscus vulgaris - Coscinodiscus wailesii - Coscinodiscus wakuraensis - Coscinodiscus wallichianus - Coscinodiscus weissflogianus - Coscinodiscus weissflogii - Coscinodiscus weissflogii - Coscinodiscus werffi - Coscinodiscus weyprechtii - Coscinodiscus whampoensis - Coscinodiscus wittianus - Coscinodiscus woodwardi - Coscinodiscus woodwardii - Coscinodiscus zebuensis - Coscinodiscus zeta - Coscinodiscus zonulatus

, Names brought to synonymy

- Coscinodiscus craspedodiscus, a synonym for Craspedodiscus elegans
- Coscinodiscus fallax, a synonym for Thalassiosira weissflogii
- Coscinodiscus normanii, a synonym for Actinocyclus normanii
