= Craspedodiscus (ammonite) =

Craspedodiscus Temporal range: mLCretaceous

Scientific classification
- Kingdom: Animalia
- Phylum: Mollusca
- Class: Cephalopoda
- Subclass: Ammonoidea
- Order: Ammonitida
- Superfamily: Perisphinctoidea
- Family: Olcostephanitidae
- Genus: Craspedodiscus Spath, 1924

Genus of molluscs (fossil)

Craspedodiscus is a genus of cephalopods in the ammonite superfamily Perisphinctoidea from the mid Early Cretaceous (Hauterivian-Barremian) of Northern Europe and Siberia that lived some 125 Ma.

Craspedodiscus is discoidal with laterally compressed whorls and a narrowly rounded venter, covered with fine ribbing. It is placed in the subfamily Simbirskitinae in the family Olcostephanitidae.
