= Aorangaia Island =

Island in New Zealand

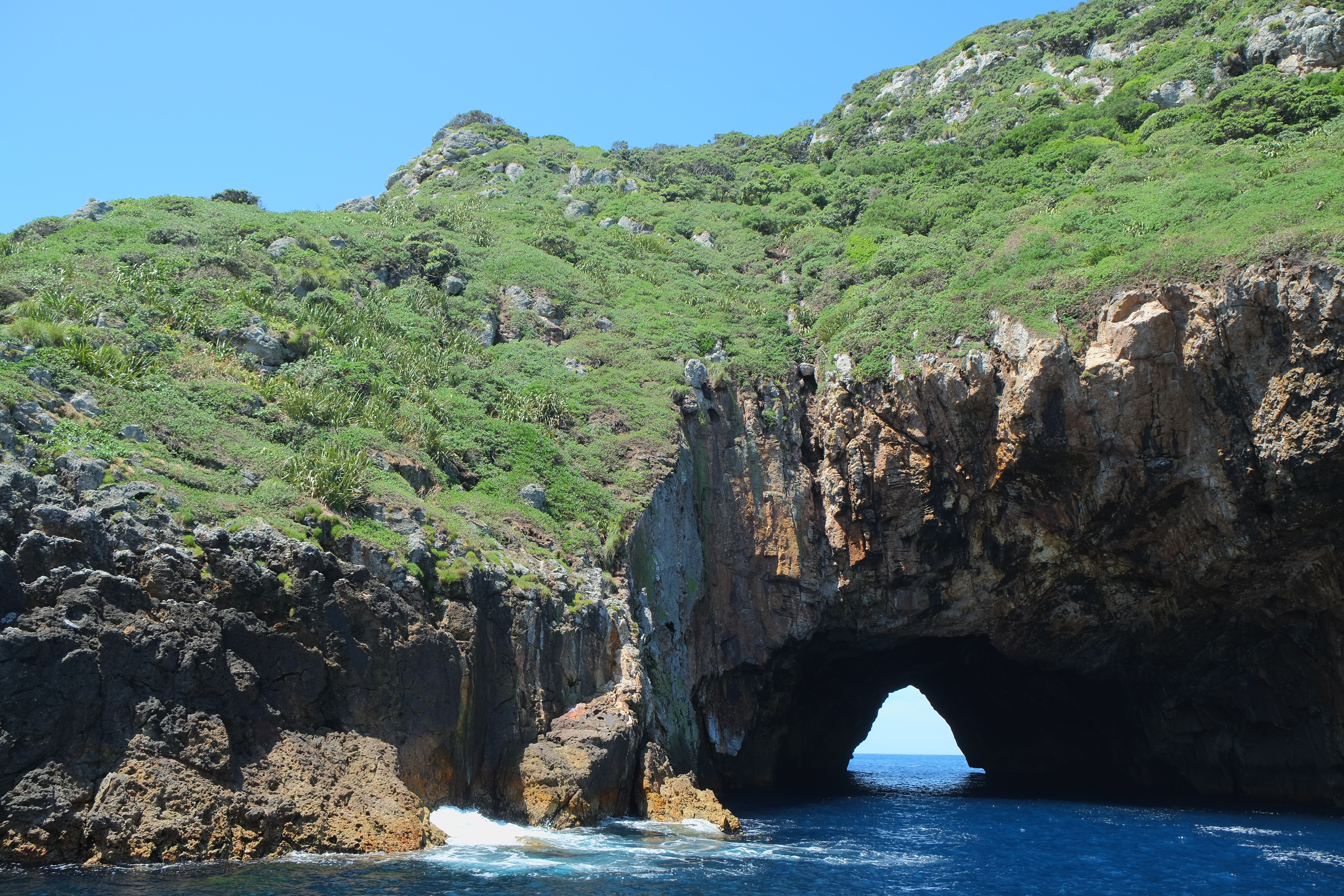
- Rock tunnel in Aorangaia Island
- Interactive map of Aorangaia Island

Geography
- Location: Northland Region
- Coordinates: 35.4862°S 174.7466°E
- Highest elevation: 102 m (335 ft)

Administration
- New Zealand

Demographics
- Population: 0

Aorangaia Island is an island in the Northland Region of New Zealand, part of the Poor Knights Islands. It has a highest point of 102 metres (335 ft) and is 21 kilometres (13 mi) from the New Zealand mainland.

== See also ==
- List of islands of New Zealand
- List of islands
- Desert island
