= Poor Knights Islands =

Group of islands and marine reserve off the east coast of New Zealand's North Island

Tawhiti Rahi (Māori)
- Interactive map of Poor Knights Islands

Geography
- Location: Northland, New Zealand
- Coordinates: 35°30′S 174°45′E
- Area: 2.714 km^{2} (1.048 sq mi)

Administration
- New Zealand
- IUCN category Ia (strict nature reserve)
- Designated: 1975

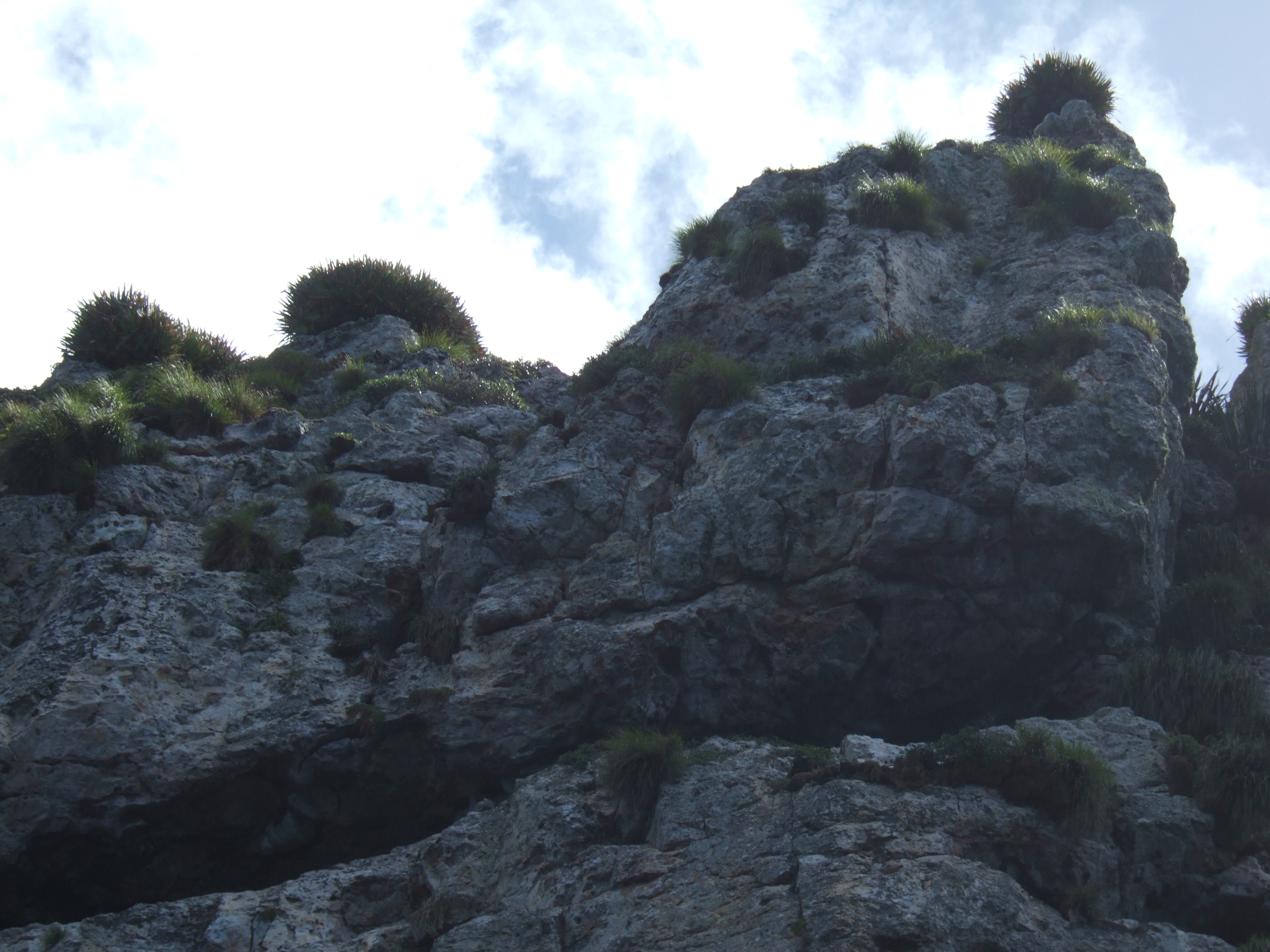
Poor Knights lily (Xeronema callistemon) plants growing in situ

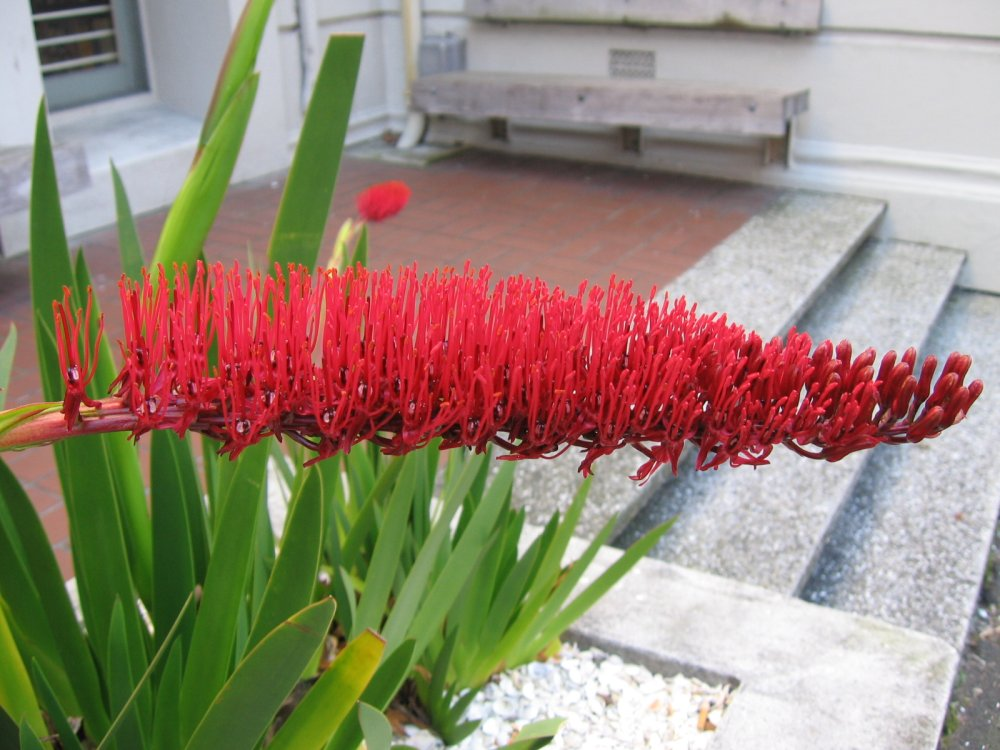
Flowering Poor Knights lily in cultivation

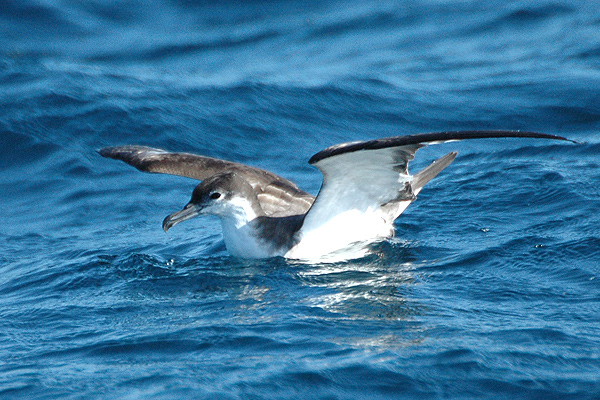
Large numbers of Buller's shearwaters breed on the islands

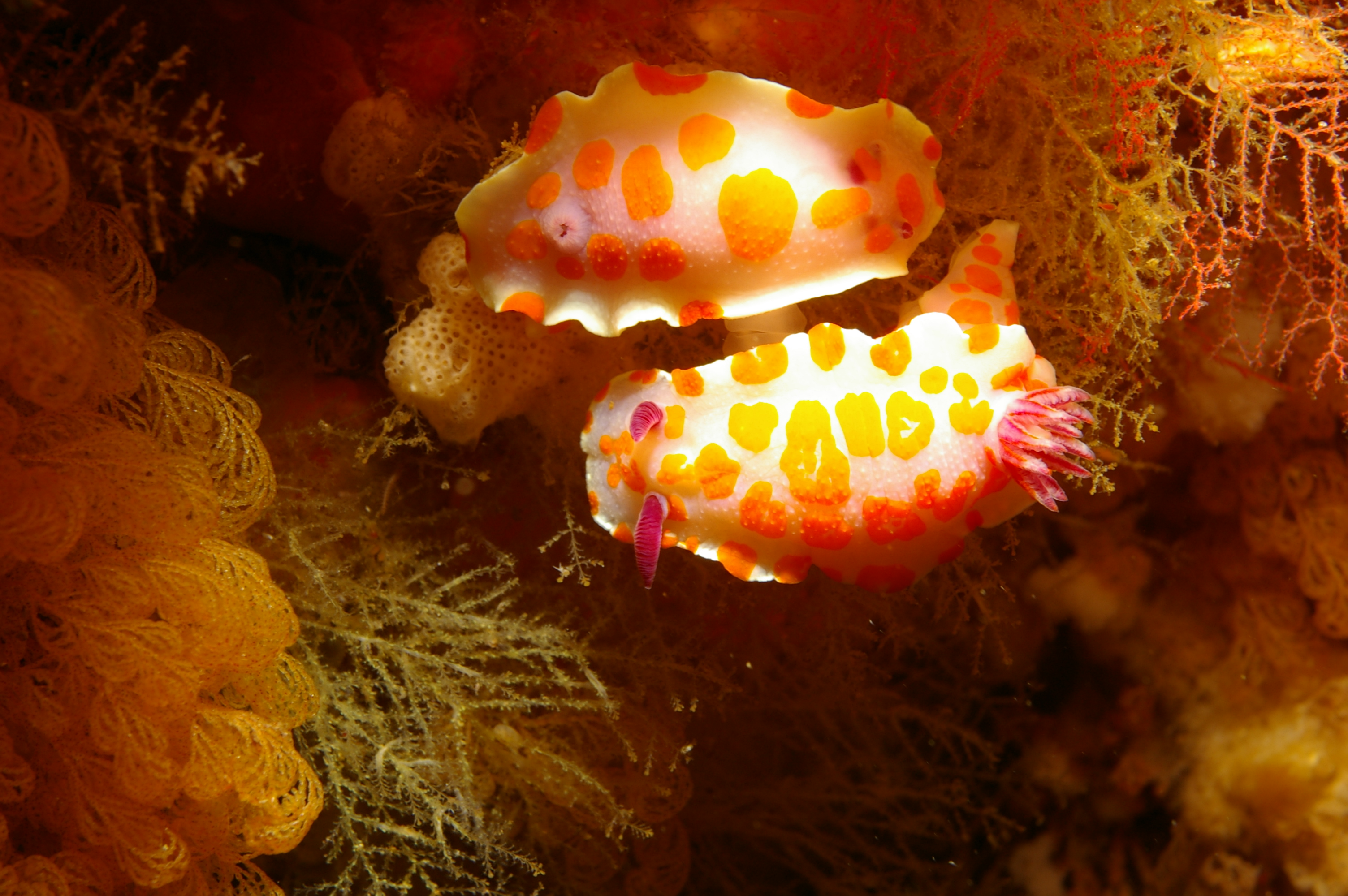
The waters off the Poor Knights are a marine reserve with subtropical species

The Poor Knights Islands (Māori: Tawhiti Rahi) are a group of islands off the east coast of the Northland Region of the North Island of New Zealand. They lie 50 kilometres (31 mi) to the northeast of Whangārei, and 22 kilometres (14 mi) offshore halfway between Bream Head and Cape Brett. Uninhabited since the 1820s, they are a nature reserve and popular underwater diving spot, with boat tours typically departing from Tutukaka. The Poor Knights Islands Marine Reserve surrounds the island.

Historian John Beaglehole (1955) comments that the origin of the islands' name is not clear, and speculates that the name could be related to the Poor Knights of Windsor, or that the islands were named for their resemblance to Poor Knight's Pudding, a bread-based dish topped with egg and fried, popular at the time of discovery by Europeans.

== Description ==
The chain consists of two large islands (Tawhiti Rahi, the larger at 151.5 ha (374 acres), and Aorangi (101 ha (250 acres)) to the south), and several smaller islands. Aorangaia and Archway Island lie to the southwest of Aorangi Island, and there is also a group of smaller rocky islets between the two main islands, the largest of which is Motu Kapiti Island. Others include Bird and Kaka Rock.

To the south, there is a smaller island named Ngoio Rock. The Poor Knights Islands are the eroded remnants of a 4-million-year-old rhyolitic volcano that is estimated to have been 1,000 metres (3,300 ft) tall and 25 kilometres (16 mi) in diameter.

=== Oceanography ===
Spring tide range for the islands is around 2 m (6.56 ft), decreasing to a neap tide of around 1 m (3.28 ft). The deep water around the island results in only moderate tidal currents. These are around the same magnitude as the prevailing shelf currents. In the general vicinity of the islands mean flows are around 0.2 m/s (0.656 ft/s) and run toward the southeast.

A remarkable feature of the region is the large internal tides that occur. These are a form of internal wave driven by the local tidal flow forcing the stratification against sloping areas of the shelf face. The surface manifestation of these waves can be seen from space. These waves generate brief highly localised accelerations. Internal wave amplitudes of around 100 m (109 yd) have been observed, generating flow speeds as great as 0.5 m/s (1.64 ft/s).

== Geology ==
The Poor Knights Islands were created in some of the earliest eruptions of the Coromandel Volcanic Zone, between 10 and 9.5 million years ago. The Poor Knights Islands vulcanism represents an early period for the Coromandel Volcanic Zone, as changes in tectonic forces caused the east belt of the Northland Arc (23 to 16 million years ago) to begin moving southwards, and eventually forming the modern Taupō Volcanic Zone.

== Environment ==
The islands are protected as a nature reserve and a permit is required to land or tie boats up. Permits are usually granted only for scientific research. A notable native plant of the islands is the spectacularly flowering Poor Knights lily, which has become a popular garden plant.

Feral pigs, which had roamed Aorangi since the departure of Māori in the 1820s, were exterminated in 1936. The islands have been identified as an Important Bird Area, by BirdLife International because they are home to a breeding population of about 200,000 pairs of Buller's shearwaters.

The islands contain rock arches and sea caves, including Rikoriko Cave, the largest sea cave by volume in the southern hemisphere, with a cavern measuring 221,494 cubic metres (7,822,000 cu ft) and an opening large enough for small tour boats to enter. Rikoriko Cave measures 130 by 80 metres (430 by 260 ft), with a ceiling height of 35 metres (115 ft) and extends 26 metres (85 ft) deep below water.

Tawhiti Rahi contains the Northern Arch, Middle Arch, and Maomao Arch, the latter being a popular diving location. Aorangaia Island's east–west rock arch resembles a long tunnel, while the aptly named Archway Island is bisected by two rock arches, with the larger Cathedral Arch about 40 metres (130 ft) tall.

== History ==
The islands were earlier inhabited by Māori of the Ngāti Wai and Ngati-Toki tribes who grew crops and fished the surrounding sea. The tribe traded with other Maori.

A chief of the tribe named Tatua led his warriors on a fighting expedition to the Hauraki Gulf with Ngā Puhi chief Hongi Hika in the early 1820s. While they were away, a slave named Paha escaped the islands and travelled to Hokianga where he told Waikato, a chief of the Hikutu tribe, that the islands had been left undefended. As Waikato had been offended by Tatua some years previous when he was refused pigs he had come to trade for, so he and his warriors set out on three large canoes to attack the islands. They arrived at the islands one night in December 1823 and soon overpowered the islanders in the absence of their warriors. Many islanders jumped off the high cliffs to avoid being taken as slaves. Tatua's wife Oneho and daughter were captured and taken to the mainland where a distant relative recognised the wife and helped the two to escape.

Tatua returned to the islands to find a scene of destruction. Only nine or ten people were left on the islands, including his five-year-old son Wehiwehi who had been hidden in a cave during the attack. The islands were declared tapu and Tatua left with the survivors and went to Rawhiti in the Bay of Islands where he unexpectedly found his wife and daughter.

== See also ==
- List of volcanoes in New Zealand
- List of islands of New Zealand
- List of islands
- Desert island
