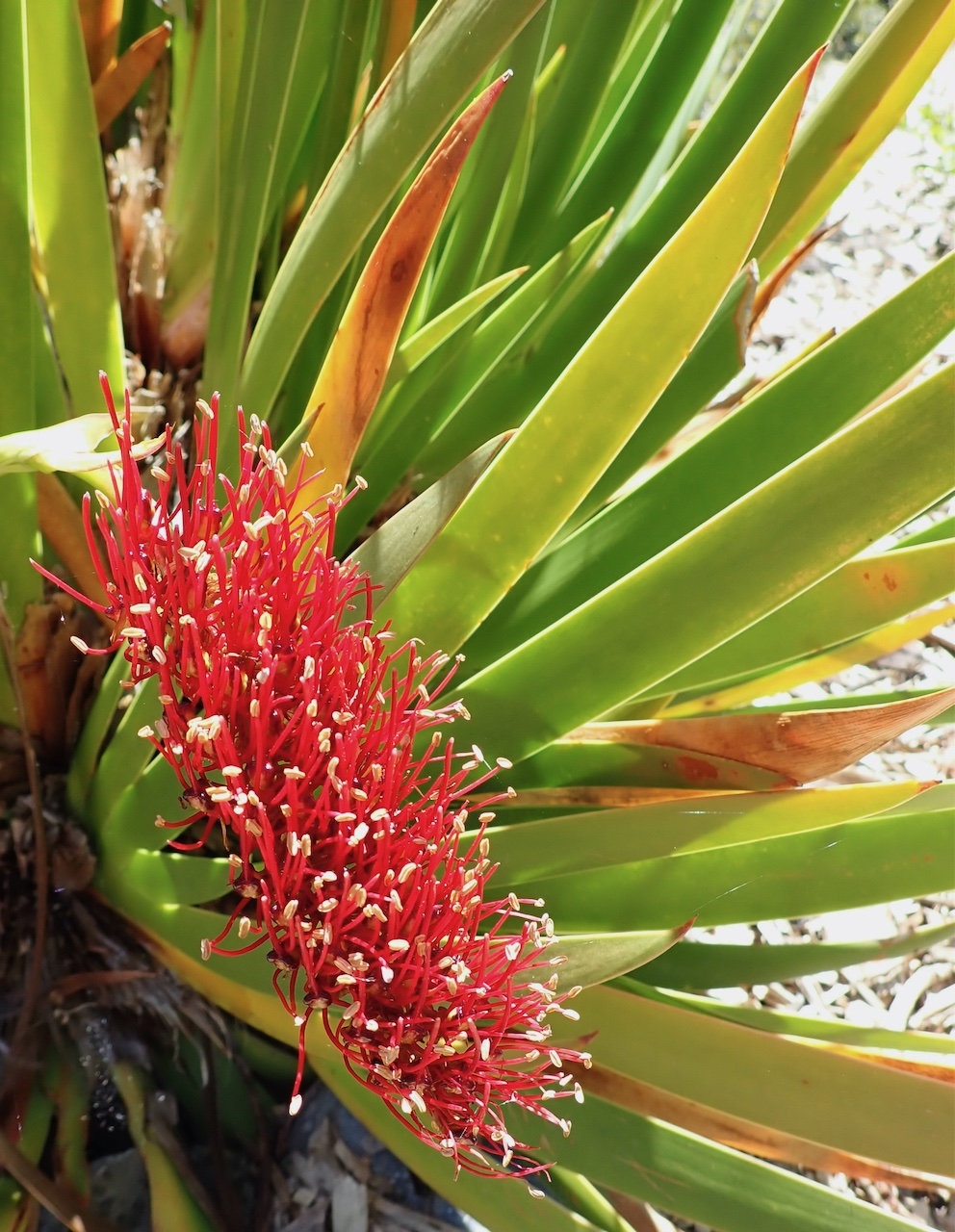
- Poor Knights lily, Ōtari-Wilton's Bush, Wellington, New Zealand

Scientific classification
- Kingdom: Plantae
- Clade: Embryophytes
- Clade: Tracheophytes
- Clade: Spermatophytes
- Clade: Angiosperms
- Clade: Monocots
- Order: Asparagales
- Family: Xeronemataceae
- Genus: Xeronema
- Species: X. callistemon

Binomial name
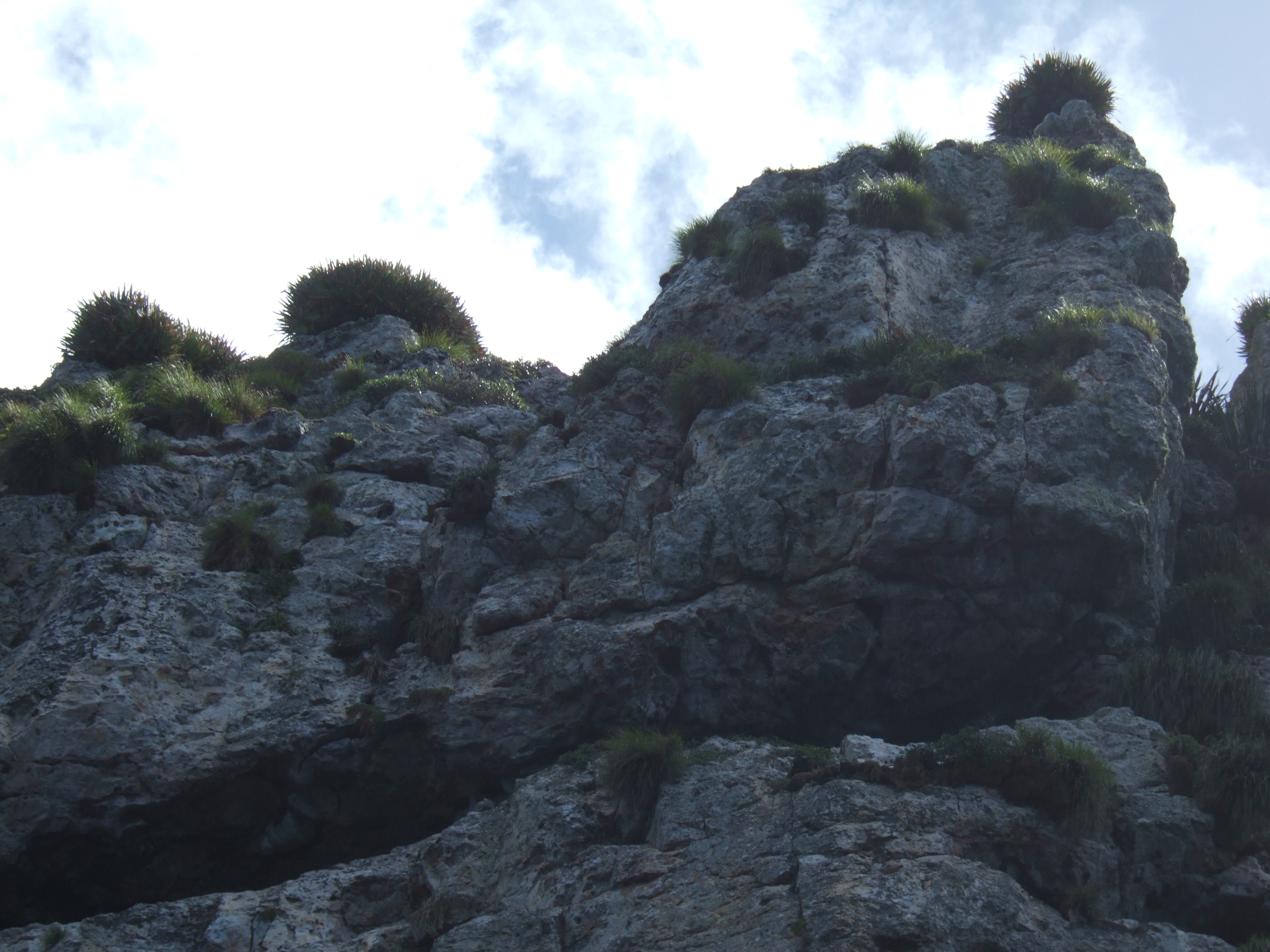
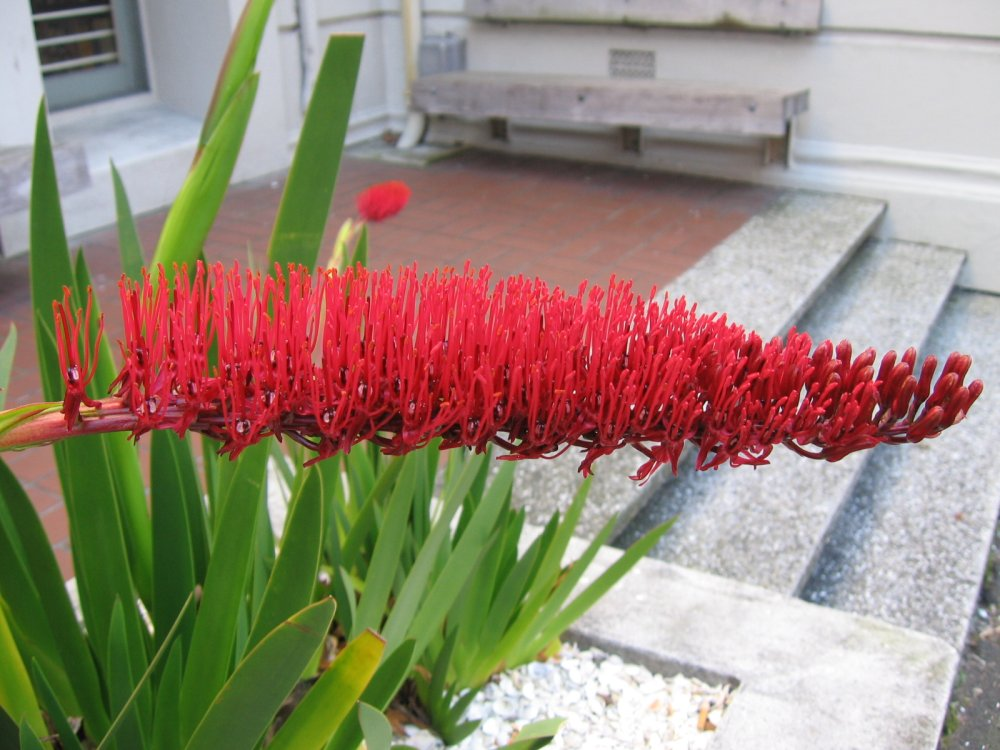
- Xeronema callistemon W.R.B. Oliv Poor Knights lily (Xeronema callistemon) plants growing in situ Flowering Poor Knights lily in cultivation

= Xeronema callistemon =

Species of flowering plant

Xeronema callistemon is a species of flowering plant endemic to the Poor Knights Islands and Taranga Island in the north of New Zealand. It was discovered in 1924 and is also called raupōtaranga (te reo Māori) or Poor Knights lily. The plant is listed as vulnerable in the 1997 IUCN Red List of Plants, but As of April 2026 is not listed in the IUCN Red List of Threatened Species.

== Description ==
The green stalks of Xeronema callistemon start growing vertically, initially sheathed by overlapping leaves. As the flower emerges, the stalk then turn sideways, growing a red flower raceme with prominent red stamens tipped with orange pollen and resembles a giant bottlebrush or toothbrush. The individual flower tepals are 10–15 mm long, the stamens up to 4 centimetres (1.6 in) tall, and the length of the brush is usually between 18 and 25 cm (7.1 and 9.8 in) and can reach 45 cm (18 in). The plant itself is about 1 m (3.3 ft) tall and 1–4 m (3.3–13.1 ft) wide.

Plants grow from fresh falling seeds. Although they germinate easily, it might take 10–15 years for them to grow into the flowering size. They flower between September and December, peaking in October (spring in New Zealand).

== Etymology ==
The common name of the plant originates from the Poor Knights Islands on which it was discovered. The islands, in turn, were so named because of their similarity in shape to the Poor Knights Pudding – a bread-based dish popular at the time of their discovery by Europeans.

The botanical species name means "with a beautiful stamen", referring to the prominent red stamens of the plant's flowers. It also may be a reference to the Australian genus Callistemon, with which the flowers share similarities.

== Habitat ==
Xeronema callistemon usually grows on rhyolite sea cliffs and rocky outcrops and sometimes in forest. It requires much water and is pollinated by birds and butterflies. If its seed falls on a nearby tree, such as Metrosideros excelsa, then it may grow as an epiphyte on it. The species has no obvious natural enemies and is listed as vulnerable because it grows naturally only on two islands. These islands are protected by the New Zealand Government as nature reserves and have a limited access. However, the plant is becoming popular for cultivation in private gardens. A related species, Xeronema moorei, is found on the islands of New Caledonia, 1500 km to the northwest.
