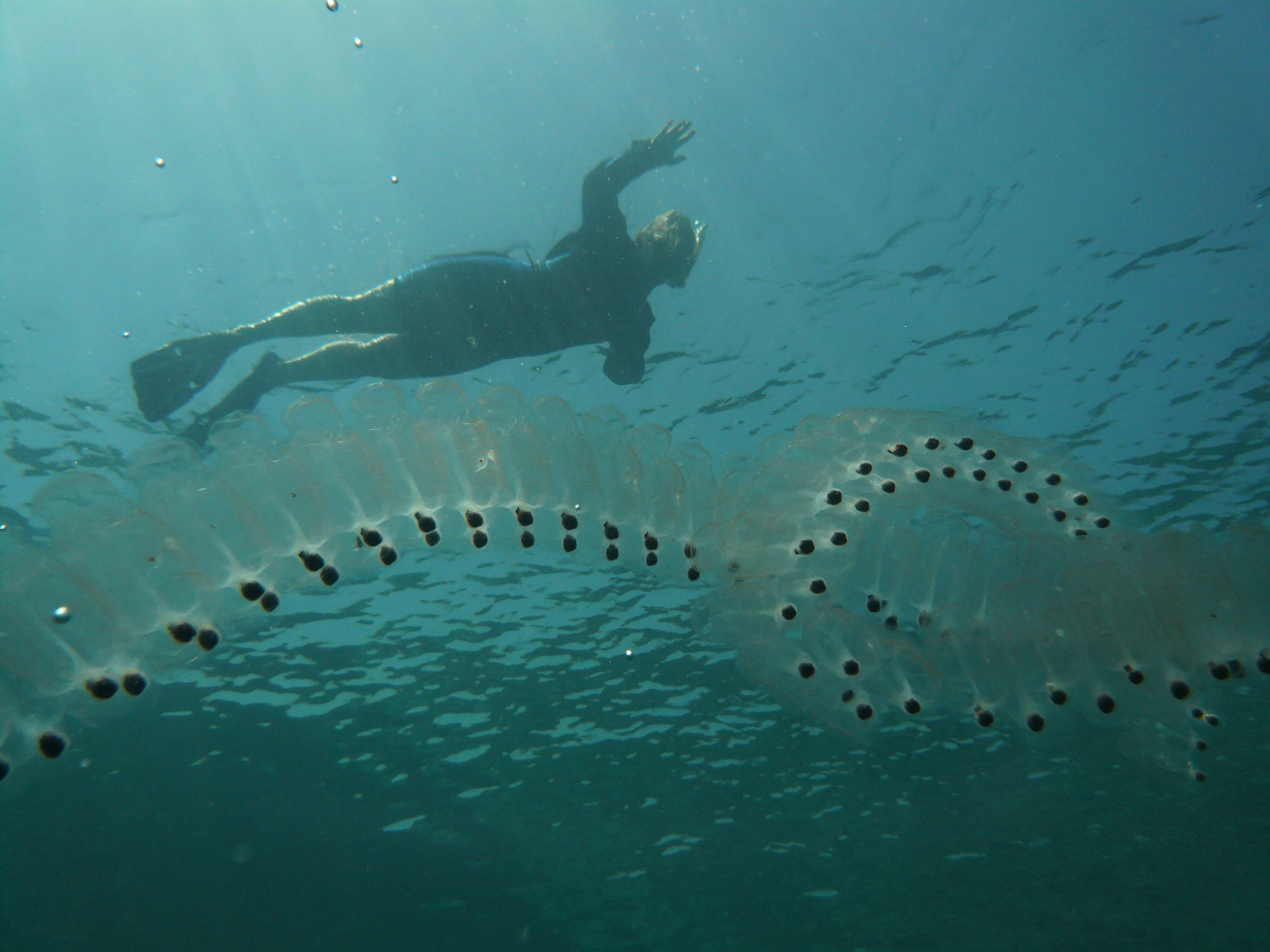
- A chain of salps near the surface in the Red Sea

Scientific classification
- Kingdom: Animalia
- Phylum: Chordata
- Subphylum: Tunicata
- Class: Thaliacea
- Order: Salpida
- Family: Salpidae; Lahille, 1888

Subfamilies, genera and species
- See text

= Salp =

Family of tunicates

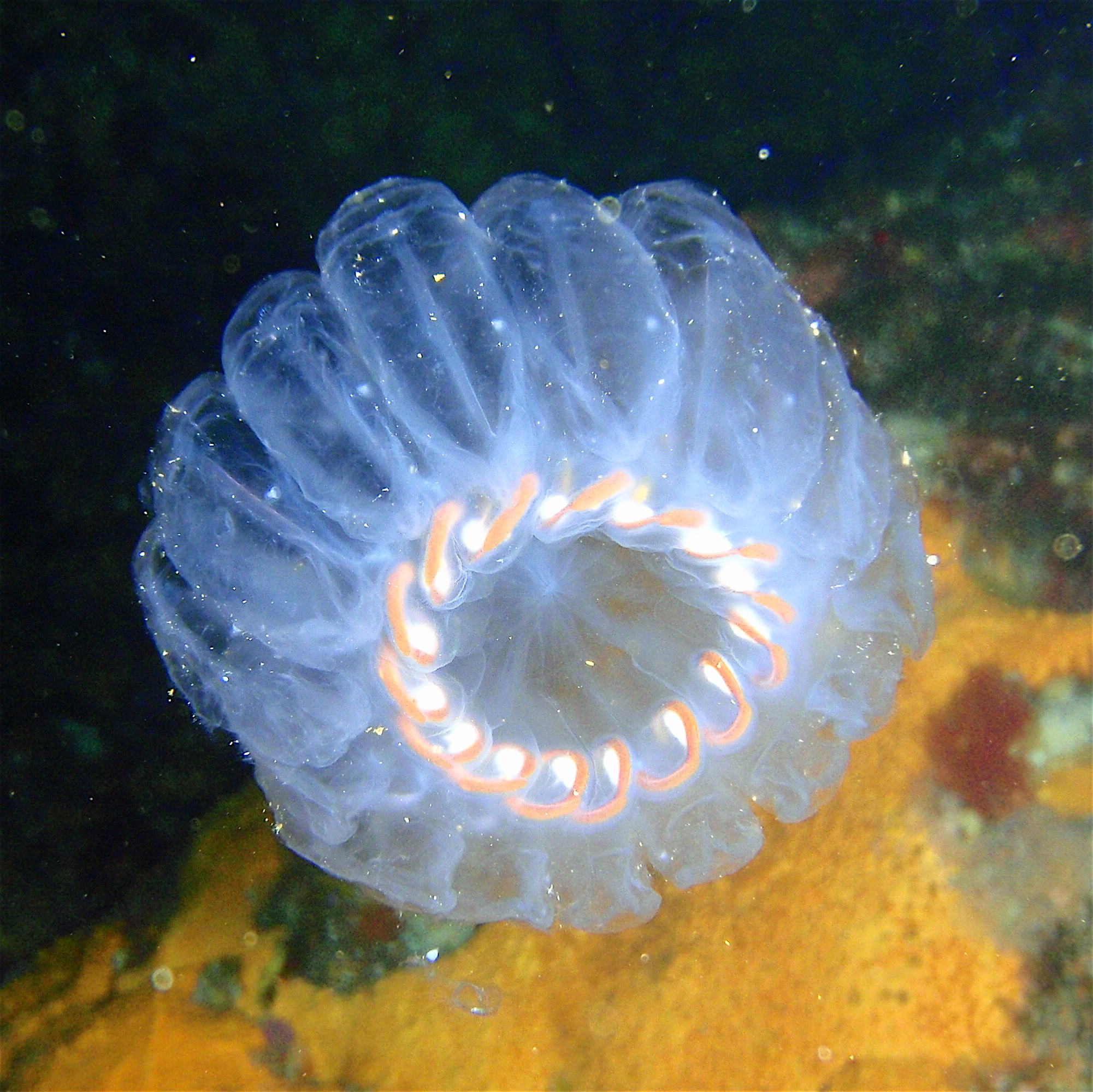
Circular ring cluster of pelagic salps off Aorangaia Island, New Zealand

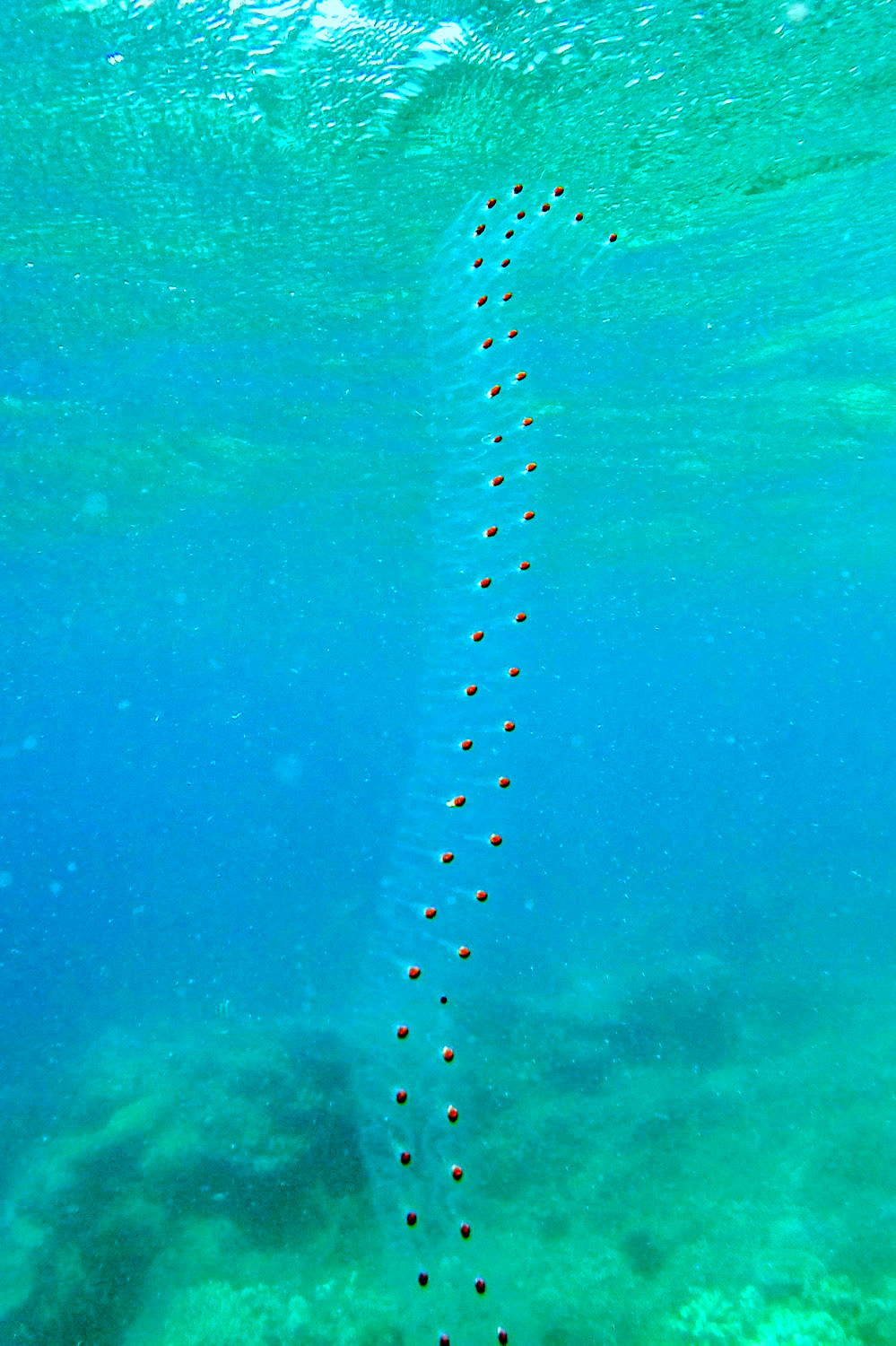
Salp chain off Zanzibar

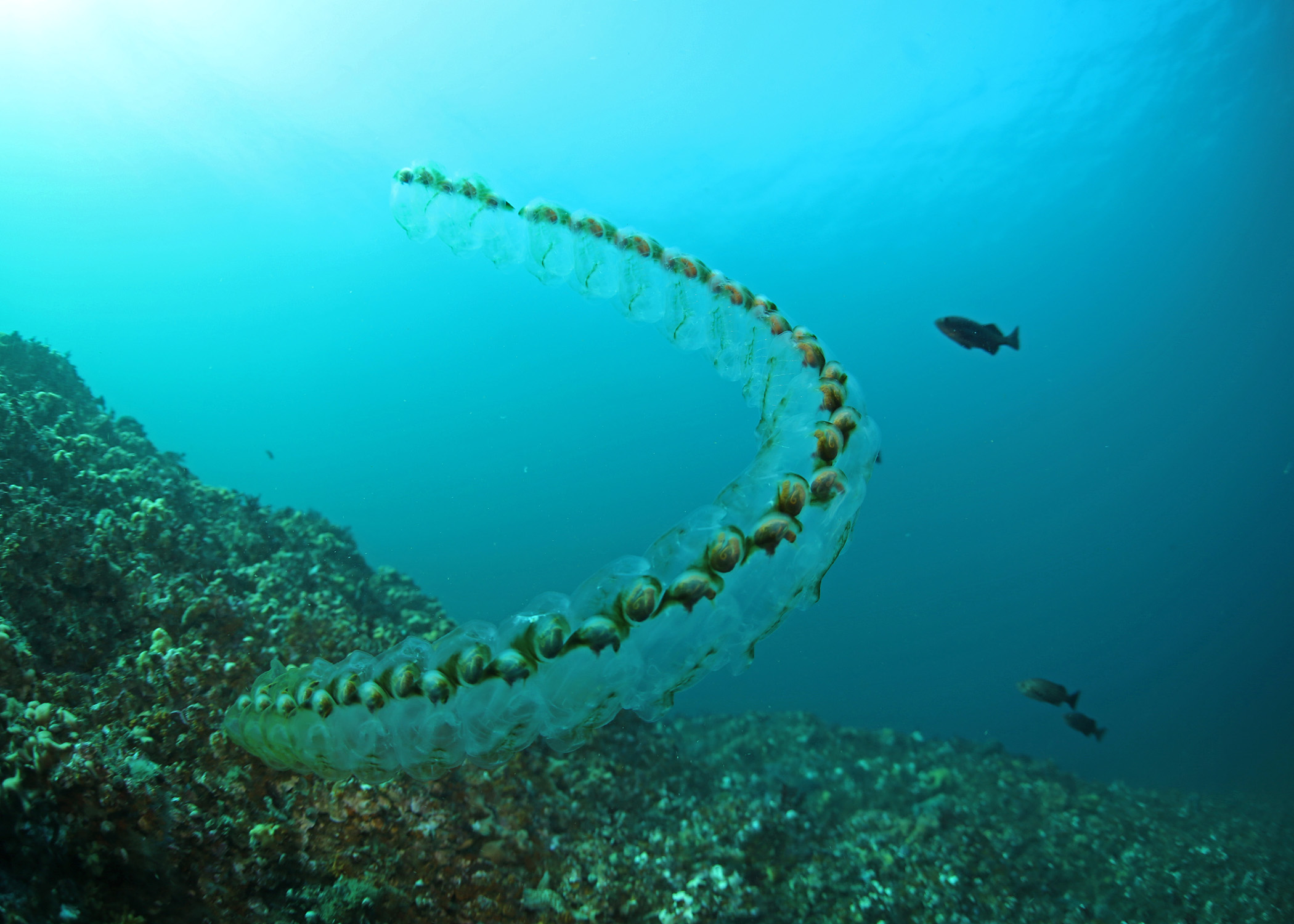
Another salp chain off Oregon

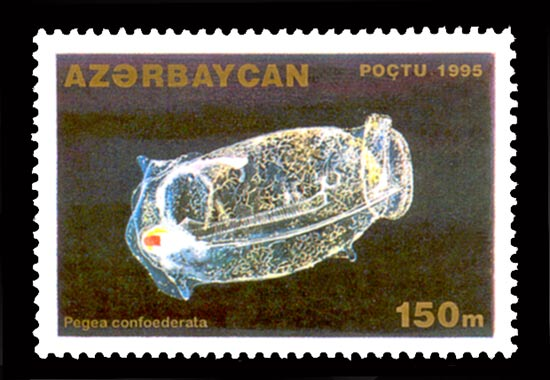
Pegea confederata on a 1995 stamp from Azerbaijan

A salp (pl.: salps) or salpa (pl.: salpae or salpas) is a barrel-shaped, planktonic tunicate in the family Salpidae. The salp moves by contracting its gelatinous body in order to pump water through it; it is one of the most efficient examples of jet propulsion in the animal kingdom. The salp feeds on phytoplankton, which it collects by straining water through its internal feeding filters. Although they superficially resemble jellyfish, they are more closely related to vertebrates.

== Distribution ==
Salps are common in equatorial, temperate, and cold seas, where they can be seen at the surface, singly or in long, stringy colonies. The most abundant concentrations of salps are in the Southern Ocean (near Antarctica), where they sometimes form enormous swarms, often in deep water, and are sometimes even more abundant than krill. Since 1910, while krill populations in the Southern Ocean have declined, salp populations appear to be increasing. Salps have been seen in increasing numbers along the coast of Washington, United States.

== Life cycle ==
Salps have a complex life cycle, with an obligatory alternation of generations. Both portions of the life cycle exist together in the seas—they look quite different, but both are mostly transparent, tubular, gelatinous animals that are typically between 1 and 10 cm (0.4 and 3.9 in) long. The solitary life history phase, also known as an oozooid, is a single, barrel-shaped animal that reproduces asexually by producing a chain of tens to hundreds of individuals, which are released from the parent at a small size.

The chain of salps is the 'aggregate' portion of the life cycle. The aggregate individuals are also known as blastozooids; they remain attached together while swimming and feeding, and each individual grows in size. Each blastozooid in the chain reproduces sexually (the blastozooids are sequential hermaphrodites, first maturing as females, and are fertilized by male gametes produced by older chains), with a growing embryo oozooid attached to the body wall of the parent.

The growing oozooids are eventually released from the parent blastozooids, and then continue to feed and grow as the solitary asexual phase, closing the life cycle of salps. The alternation of generations allows for a fast generation time, with both solitary individuals and aggregate chains living and feeding together in the sea. When phytoplankton is abundant, this rapid reproduction leads to fairly short-lived blooms of salps, which eventually filter out most of the phytoplankton. The bloom ends when enough food is no longer available to sustain the enormous population of salps. Occasionally, mushroom corals and those of the genus Heteropsammia are known to feed on salps during blooms.

== History ==
The incursion of a large number of salps (Salpa fusiformis) into the North Sea in 1920 led to a failure of the Scottish herring fishery.

== Oceanographic importance ==
A reason for the success of salps is how fast they respond to phytoplankton blooms. When food is plentiful, salps can quickly bud off clones, which graze on the phytoplankton and can grow at a rate that is probably faster than that of any other multicellular animal, quickly stripping the phytoplankton from the sea. But if the phytoplankton is too dense, the salps can clog and sink to the bottom. During these blooms, beaches can become slimy with mats of salp bodies, and other planktonic species can experience fluctuations in their numbers due to competition with the salps.

Sinking fecal pellets and bodies of salps carry carbon to the seafloor, and salps are abundant enough to have an effect on the ocean's biological pump. Consequently, large changes in their abundance or distribution may alter the ocean's carbon cycle, and potentially play a role in climate change.

== Nervous systems and relationships to other animals ==
Salps are closely related to the pelagic tunicate groups Doliolida and Pyrosoma, as well as to other bottom-living (benthic) tunicates.

Although salps appear similar to jellyfish because of their simple body form and planktonic behavior, they are chordates: animals with dorsal nerve cords, related to vertebrates (animals with backbones).

Small fish swim inside salps as protection from predators.

== Classification ==
The World Register of Marine Species lists the following genera and species in the order Salpida:

- Order Salpida
  - Family Salpidae
    - Subfamily Cyclosalpinae
      - Genus Cyclosalpa de Blainville, 1827
        - Cyclosalpa affinis (Chamisso, 1819)
        - Cyclosalpa bakeri Ritter, 1905
        - Cyclosalpa foxtoni Van Soest, 1974
        - Cyclosalpa ihlei van Soest, 1974
        - Cyclosalpa pinnata (Forskål, 1775)
        - Cyclosalpa polae Sigl, 1912
        - Cyclosalpa quadriluminis Berner, 1955
        - Cyclosalpa sewelli Metcalf, 1927
        - Cyclosalpa strongylenteron Berner, 1955
      - Genus Helicosalpa Todaro, 1902
        - Helicosalpa komaii (Ihle & Ihle-Landenberg, 1936)
        - Helicosalpa virgula (Vogt, 1854)
        - Helicosalpa younti Kashkina, 1973
    - Subfamily Salpinae
      - Genus Brooksia Metcalf, 1918
        - Brooksia berneri van Soest, 1975
        - Brooksia rostrata (Traustedt, 1893)
      - Genus Ihlea Metcalf, 1919
        - Ihlea magalhanica (Apstein, 1894)
        - Ihlea punctata (Forskål, 1775)
        - Ihlea racovitzai (van Beneden & Selys Longchamp, 1913)
      - Genus Metcalfina
        - Metcalfina hexagona (Quoy & Gaimard, 1824)
      - Genus Pegea Savigny, 1816
        - Pegea bicaudata (Quoy & Gaimard, 1826)
        - Pegea confederata (Forsskål, 1775)
      - Genus Ritteriella Metcalf, 1919
        - Ritteriella amboinensis (Apstein, 1904)
        - Ritteriella picteti (Apstein, 1904)
        - Ritteriella retracta (Ritter, 1906)
      - Genus Salpa Forskål, 1775
        - Salpa aspera Chamisso, 1819
        - Salpa fusiformis Cuvier, 1804
        - Salpa gerlachei Foxton, 1961
        - Salpa maxima Forskål, 1775
        - Salpa thompsoni (Foxton, 1961)
        - Salpa tuberculata Metcalf, 1918
        - Salpa younti van Soest, 1973
      - Genus Soestia (also accepted as Iasis)
        - Soestia cylindrica (Cuvier, 1804)
        - Soestia zonaria (Pallas, 1774)
      - Genus Thalia
        - Thalia cicar van Soest, 1973
        - Thalia democratica Forskål, 1775
        - Thalia longicauda Quoy & Gaimard, 1824
        - Thalia orientalis Tokioka, 1937
        - Thalia rhinoceros Van Soest, 1975
        - Thalia rhomboides Quoy & Gaimard, 1824
        - Thalia sibogae Van Soest, 1973
      - Genus Thetys Tilesius, 1802
        - Thetys vagina Tilesius, 1802
      - Genus Traustedtia
        - Traustedtia multitentaculata Quoy & Gaimard, 1834
      - Genus Weelia Yount, 1954
        - Weelia cylindrica (Cuvier, 1804)
