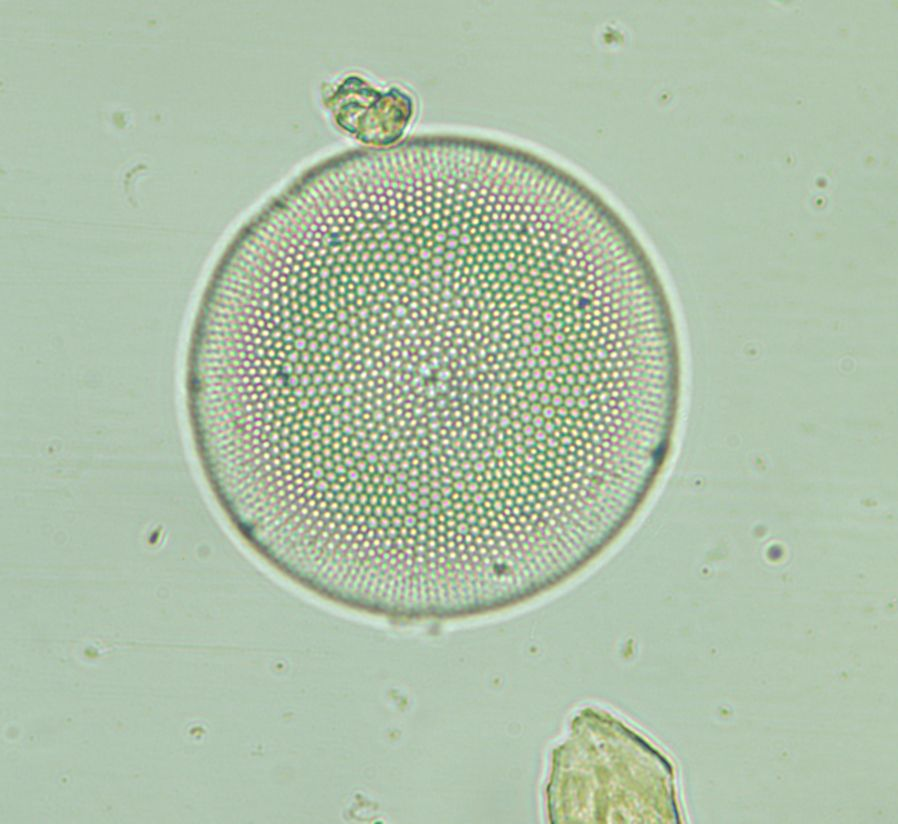
- Coscinodiscus radiatus

Scientific classification
- Domain: Eukaryota
- Clade: Sar
- Clade: Stramenopiles
- Division: Ochrophyta
- Clade: Bacillariophyta
- Class: Coscinodiscophyceae
- Order: Coscinodiscales
- Family: Coscinodiscaceae; Kützing, 1844

Type genus
- Coscinodiscus Ehrenberg, 1839

Genera
- Brightwellia; Coscinodiscus; Craspedodiscus; Palmeria; Palmerina; Stellarima

= Coscinodiscaceae =

Family of single-celled organisms

Coscinodiscaceae is a family of diatom the order Coscinodiscales. Diatoms are a type of algae characterized by their unique silica cell walls.

== Classification ==
The family includes several genera, such as Brightwellia, Coscinodiscus, Craspedodiscus, Palmeria, and Stellarima.

== Morphology ==
Members of the Coscinodiscaceae family typically exhibit disc-shaped, cylindrical, or wedge-shaped cells. Their frustules (silica cell walls) can be quite large, reaching up to 500 μm in diameter. The valve face is flat or lens-shaped, with radiate areolae extending from a central annulus.

== Distribution ==
Species within the Coscinodiscaceae family are widely distributed across various aquatic environments, ranging from oceans to freshwater bodies. They are found in regions from warm waters to boreal zones.

== Ecological role ==
Diatoms, including those in the Coscinodiscaceae family, play a crucial role in aquatic ecosystems. As primary producers, they generate organic matter through photosynthesis, which supports the food web.

== Coscinodiscus ==
- Shape: Typically, disc-shaped or slightly eccentric in girdle view.
- Frustules: Large, up to 500 μm in diameter.
- Valve face: Flat or lens-shaped with radiate areolae extending from a central annulus.
- Areolae: Loculate, covered externally by porose vela and open internally via foramina.
- Rimoportulae: Present, arranged at regular intervals around the valve face.

== Brightwellia ==
- Shape: Cylindrical or wedge-shaped.
- Frustules: Smaller compared to Coscinodiscus.
- Valve face: Often more convex with radiate areolae.
- Areolae: Similar loculate structure but with different external coverings.
- Rimoportulae: Less prominent, often fewer in number

== Craspedodiscus ==
- Shape: Disc-shaped but with more pronounced eccentricity.
- Frustules: Medium-sized.
- Valve face: Flat with radiate areolae, similar to Coscinodiscus but with distinct patterns
- Areolae: Loculate, with unique internal structures
- Rimoportulae: Present, often larger and more spaced out

== Palmeria ==
- Shape: Cylindrical or barrel shaped.
- Frustules: Medium to large.
- Valve face: Convex with radiate areolae.
- Areolae: Loculate, with complex internal structures.
- Rimoportulae: Prominent, often with elaborate internal processes

== Stellarima ==
- Shape: Star-shaped or disc-shaped with pronounced radial symmetry.
- Frustules: Medium-sized.
- Valve face: Flat with radiate areolae extending from a central point.
- Areolae: Loculate, with unique external coverings.
- Rimoportulae: Present, often arranged in a star-like pattern

.
