= Jelly-falls =

Marine carbon cycling events whereby gelatinous zooplankton sink to the seafloor

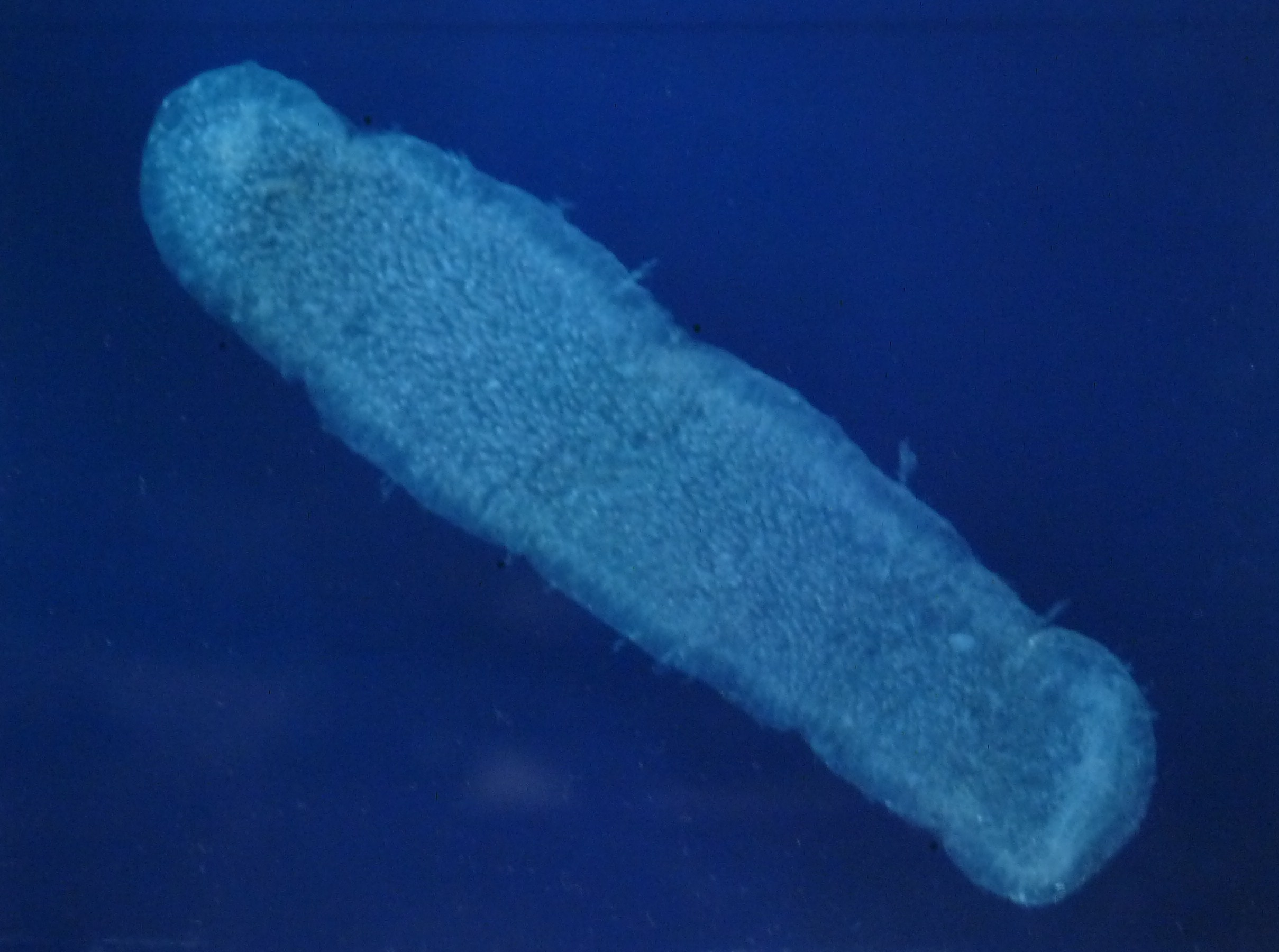
A mass deposition of Pyrosoma atlanticum carcasses was found along an oil pipeline in West Africa in 2006.

Jelly-falls are marine carbon cycling events whereby gelatinous zooplankton, primarily cnidarians, sink to the seafloor and enhance carbon and nitrogen fluxes via rapidly sinking particulate organic matter. These events provide nutrition to benthic megafauna and bacteria. Jelly-falls have been implicated as a major "gelatinous pathway" for the sequestration of labile biogenic carbon through the biological pump. The high abundance and wide geographic distribution of gelatinous zooplankton means that jelly-falls are a large component of the global biological pump. The contribution they provide to the export of labile organic carbon to the seafloor is comparable to that of other detrital pulses like phytoplankton blooms and marine snow aggregates. These events are common in protected areas with high levels of primary production and water quality suitable to support cnidarian species. These areas include estuaries and several studies have been conducted in fjords of Norway.

In rare cases where scavengers are not present or the water is particularly still, thousands of jellyfish can accumulate in depressions on the seafloor to create "jelly-lakes".

== Initiation ==
Jelly-falls are primarily made up of the decaying bodies of Cnidaria and Thaliacea (Pyrosomida, Doliolida, and Salpida). Several circumstances can trigger the death of gelatinous organisms which would cause them to sink. These include high levels of primary production that can clog the feeding apparatuses of the organisms, a sudden temperature change, when an old bloom runs out of food, when predators damage the bodies of the jellies, and parasitism. In general, however, jelly-falls are linked to jelly-blooms and primary production, with over 75% of the jelly falls in subpolar and temperate regions occurring after spring blooms, and over 25% of the jelly-falls in the tropics occurring after upwelling events.

With global climates shifting towards creating warmer and more acidic oceans, conditions not favored by non-resilient species, jellies are likely to grow in population sizes. Eutrophic areas and dead zones can become jelly hot spots with substantial blooms. As the climate changes and ocean waters warm, jelly blooms become more prolific and the transport of jelly-carbon to the lower ocean increases. With a possible slowing of the classic biological pump, the transport of carbon and nutrients to the deep sea through jelly-falls may become more and more important to deep ocean.

== Anthropogenic links ==
Due to human activity there has been an increase in the frequency and intensity of jellyfish blooms. This in turn has been speculated to enhance the occurrence of jelly-falls. Overfishing small pelagic fishes and other zooplanktivores can reduce competition for planktonic resources and removes the key predators that feed on gelatinous zooplankton which allows jellyfish populations to increase. Coastal eutrophication from agricultural and urban runoff also creates hypoxic zones that are avoided by most fish and crustaceans species, but many cnidarians and thaliaceans can tolerate which further benefits jellyfish populations. Jelly derived carbon on the seafloor is expected to increase substantially due to these reasons along with the rise of sea surface temperatures primarily in coastal and shelf regions.

== Decomposition ==
The decomposition process starts after death and can proceed in the water column as the gelatinous organisms are sinking. Decay happens faster in the tropics than in temperate and subpolar waters as a result of warmer temperatures. In the tropics, a jelly-fall may take less than 2 days to decay in warmer, surface water, but as many as 25 days when it is lower than 1000 m deep. The reduction of organic matter stemming from jelly-falls with depth follows an exponential decline. In more tropical and subtropical waters less than 10% of surface-derived jelly-carbon reaches down to depths below 1000 meters. However, in subpolar regions 30-40% of jelly carbon reaches below 1000 meters. This is due to lower water temperatures which slows the microbial decay during sinking. Lone gelatinous organisms may spend less time on the sea floor as one study found that jellies could be decomposed by scavengers in the Norwegian deep sea in under two and a half hours.

Decomposition of jelly-falls is largely aided by these kinds of scavengers. In general, echinoderms, such as sea stars, have emerged as the primary consumer of jelly-falls, followed by crustaceans and fish. However, which scavengers find their way to jelly-falls is highly reliant on each ecosystem. For example, in an experiment in the Norwegian deep sea, hagfish were the first scavengers to find the traps of decaying jellies, followed by squat lobsters, and finally decapod shrimp. Photographs taken off the coast of Norway on natural jelly-falls also revealed caridean shrimp feeding on jelly carcasses. Jelly-falls can serve as an efficient energy pathway to commercially important deep-water species. There is direct observation in deep Norwegian waters that revealed deep-water shrimp Pandalus borealis feeds extensively on jellyfish carcasses. This transfers carbon from episodic surface blooms to benthic populations. The dynamics of scavenging varies greatly across Norwegian fjords. Shallow jelly-falls have been consumed by demersal fish and large crustacean species, while the deeper falls are dominated by smaller, slower moving scavengers such as ophiuroids and gastropods which results in longer carcasses persistence.

With increased populations and blooms becoming more common, with favorable conditions and a lack of other filter feeders in the area to consume plankton, environments with jellies present will have carbon pumps be more primarily supplied with jelly-falls. This could lead to issues of habitats with established biological pumps succumbing to nonequilibrium as the presence of jellies would change the food web as well as changes to the amount of carbon deposited into the sediment. Finally, decomposition is aided by the microbial community. In a case study on the Black Sea, the number of bacteria increased in the presence of jelly-falls, and the bacteria were shown to preferentially use nitrogen released from decaying jelly carcasses while mostly leaving carbon. In a study conducted by Andrew Sweetman in 2016, it was discovered using core samples of the sediment in Norwegian fjords, the presence of jelly-falls significantly impacted the biochemical process of these benthic communities. Bacteria consume jelly carcasses rapidly, removing opportunities of acquiring sustenance for bottoming feeding macrofauna, which has impacts traveling up the trophic levels. In addition, with the exclusion of scavengers, jelly-falls develop a white layer of bacteria over the decaying carcasses and emit a black residue over the surrounding area, which is from sulfide. This high level of microbial activity requires a lot of oxygen, which can lead zones around jelly-falls to become hypoxic and inhospitable to larger scavengers. By providing abundant nutrients and surfaces for bacterial colonization and interactions, jelly-falls can also be hotspots for the transmission of antimicrobial resistance genes among marine bacterial communities.

== Global scale and biogeochemical fingerprint ==
Gelatinous zooplankton has substantial global biomass. Estimates are derived from net tows and optical surveys that indicate jellyfish, salps, and other gelatinous organisms contribute significantly to the total zooplankton carbon from all ocean basins. The geographic variation of biomass is primarily controlled by temperature and water column stability. Highest concentrations of biomass are observed in coastal upwelling zones, polar regions, and areas that have high seasonal productivity. The small fluctuations of gelatinous zooplankton on a daily basis could produce a flux of particulate organic carbon comparable to that of non-gelatinous detritus like phytoplankton blooms.

== Research challenges ==
Researching jelly-falls relies on direct observational data such as video, photography, or benthic trawls. A complication with trawling for jelly-falls is the gelatinous carcass easily falls apart and as a result, opportunistic photography, videography, and chemical analysis have been primary methods of monitoring. This means that jelly-falls are not always observed in the time period in which they exist. Because jelly-falls can be fully processed and degraded within a number of hours by scavengers and the fact that some jelly-falls will not sink below 500 m in tropical and subtropical waters, the importance and prevalence of jelly-falls may be underestimated.

== See also ==
- Biological pump
- Jellyfish
- Pyrosoma atlanticum
- Whale fall
- Deep sea community
- Dead zone
