= Pyrosoma aherniosum =

Scientific classification
- Kingdom: Animalia
- Phylum: Chordata
- Subphylum: Tunicata
- Class: Thaliacea
- Order: Pyrosomatida
- Family: Pyrosomatidae
- Genus: Pyrosoma
- Species: P. aherniosum

Binomial name
- Pyrosoma aherniosum Seeliger, 1895

Species of Pyrosoma

Pyrosoma aherniosum is a species of pyrosome in the genus Pyrosoma. It was first described in 1895 by Oswald Seeliger from material collected on the Plankton Expedition.

== Description ==
Colonies are transparent and measure up to 2.5 cm in length by 1.5 cm wide, with individual zooids reaching lengths of up to 4.1 mm. The oral siphon is large and broad, while the cloacal siphon is very short.

== Distribution and habitat ==
The species is marine and occurs in the subtropical Indian Ocean.

== Ecology ==
Like other pyrosomes, the species' life cycle includes both clonal and sexual phases. Colonies are solitary.
