= Pyrosomella verticillata =

Scientific classification
- Domain: Eukaryota
- Kingdom: Animalia
- Phylum: Chordata
- Subphylum: Tunicata
- Class: Thaliacea
- Order: Pyrosomatida
- Family: Pyrosomatidae
- Genus: Pyrosomella
- Species: P. verticillata

Binomial name
- Pyrosomella verticillata Neumann, 1909

Synonyms
- Pyrosoma verticillatum Neumann, 1909

Species of tunicate

Pyrosomella verticillata, the fire salp, is a species of colonial pyrosome with an Indo-Pacific distribution.

== Description ==
An individual P. verticillata zooid is typically about 4 mm long, while colonies are up to 5 cm long and 3 cm in diameter, and oval to oblong in shape. The wall of the colony is transparent and colorless.

== Distribution ==
The species occurs in the warm Indo-Pacific and from the Cape of Good Hope to Japan, and has also been reported from the southwest Atlantic off Rio de Janeiro.

== Bioluminescence ==
The species is bioluminescent, with each zooid possessing a pair of luminescent organs next to the oral siphon, within which light production is probably carried out by symbiotic bacteria. Colonies respond to incoming light (e.g. artificial stimulation) by lighting up, and this phenomenon spreads among adjacent zooids until the entire colony is lit up; this may spread to adjacent colonies. Colonies may sustain light emission for extended time periods. Light emission is accompanied with cessation of cilia motion in zooids' oral siphons, causing colonies to start sinking in the water column. This combined bioluminescence and descent behavior has been interpreted as a technique for avoiding predation.
