= Dolioletta gegenbauri =

Scientific classification
- Kingdom: Animalia
- Phylum: Chordata
- Subphylum: Tunicata
- Class: Thaliacea
- Order: Doliolida
- Family: Doliolidae
- Genus: Dolioletta
- Species: D. gegenbauri

Binomial name
- Dolioletta gegenbauri (Uljanin, 1884)

Synonyms
- Dolioletta gegenbaueri; Doliolum gegenbauri

Species of tunicate

Dolioletta gegenbauri is a species of tunicate in the family Doliolidae. It is small, exists in various forms and is sometimes found in great abundance in the Atlantic and Pacific waters where it lives.

== Life cycle ==
Dolioletta gegenbauri is a small, transparent, gelatinous marine invertebrate up to one centimetre long. It has a complex life cycle and exists in several forms of which the gonozooid, or mature zooid with gonads, is the most often seen. It is roughly cylindrical with a siphon at both of the flat ends, and has 8 bands of muscle arranged like hoops round a barrel. The U-shaped gut and other organs can be seen through the test which is pierced by 10 to 40 gill slits. The gonozooid is hermaphrodite and the eggs are fertilised by sperm from another individual. These develop into oozooids which have no reproductive organs. They have 9 bands of muscle and are known as "nurses" as they develop a tail of zooids produced asexually. Some of these are known as gastrozooids, have a nutritional function and are arranged in lateral rows. Others are phorozooids, have a transport function and are arranged in a single central row. Other zooids link to the phorozooids which then detach themselves from the nurse. The zooids develop into gonozooids and when these are mature they separate from the phorozooids to live independently and start the cycle over again. Meanwhile, the phorozooids have served their purpose and die.

Under the favourable conditions of a plentiful supply of planktonic food, a single oozooid can produce thousands of gonozooids within a few days. Dense swarms sometimes appear in which there are 500 individuals per cubic metre of water.

== Distribution ==
Dolioletta gegenbauri is found in temperate areas of the Atlantic Ocean, the Mediterranean Sea and the Red Sea. It is also found in the Pacific Ocean and is the commonest pelagic tunicate off the coast of California.

== Research ==
Research was undertaken to study the doliolids' rate of growth and the quantity of food consumed. The study also aimed to assess their importance in relation to the ecology of planktonic organisms. It sought to quantify grazing, ingestion rates and growth rates of the gonozooid stage of Dolioletta gegenbauri at various concentrations of the diatom, Thalassiosira weissflogii, and the red alga, Rhodomonas sp., and at a range of temperatures. It was found that at low to moderate concentrations of the phytoplankton, growth rates increased exponentially with concentration and that increases of temperature also increased input and growth. It was concluded that Dolioletta gegenbauri played an important role as consumers of plankton in the neritic zone on the continental shelf off the United States.

Another study in Japan found that Dolioletta gegenbauri, along with Oikopleura spp., increased greatly in number in times of algal blooms and played an important role as secondary producers.
