= Dolioletta mirabilis =

Scientific classification
- Kingdom: Animalia
- Phylum: Chordata
- Subphylum: Tunicata
- Class: Thaliacea
- Order: Doliolida
- Family: Doliolidae
- Genus: Dolioletta
- Species: D. mirabilis

Binomial name
- Dolioletta mirabilis (Korotneff, 1891)

Synonyms
- Dolchinia mirabilis Korotneff, 1891

Species of tunicate

Dolioletta mirabilis is a species of tunicate in the family Doliolidae. It is small, exists in various forms and is sometimes found in great abundance in the Indo-Pacific waters where it lives.

== Description ==
The gonozooids are the most often encountered of the forms of this animal. They are solitary hermaphrodites with eight bands of muscle that encircle the body. These gonozooids produce the oozooids, which are usually seen in smaller numbers within the population. Oozooids are distinguished by a conspicuous tail of asexually produced zooids, and have nine circumferential bands of muscle.
