= Palmicellaria elegans =

Scientific classification
- Kingdom: Animalia
- Phylum: Bryozoa
- Class: Gymnolaemata
- Order: Cheilostomatida
- Family: Celleporidae
- Genus: Palmicellaria
- Species: P. elegans

Binomial name
- Palmicellaria elegans Alder, 1864

Species of moss animal

Palmicellaria elegans is a species of marine bryozoan in the family Celleporidae.
