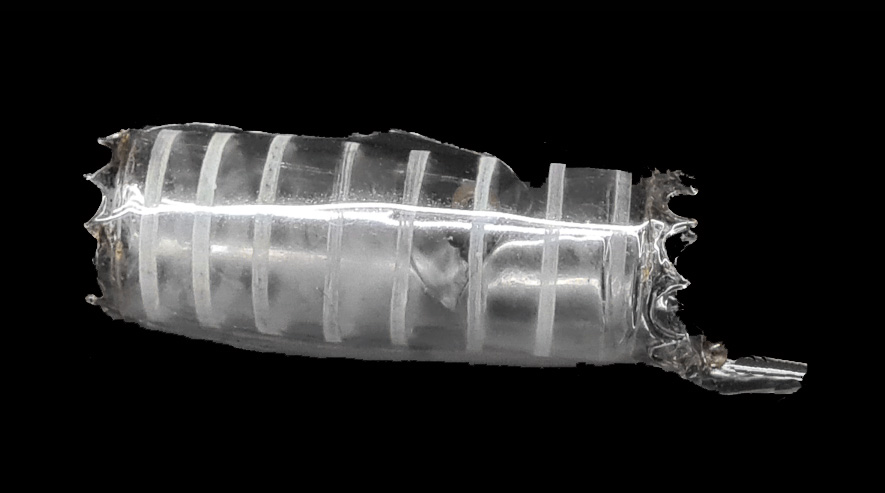
- Blaschka model of Doliolina muelleri

Scientific classification
- Kingdom: Animalia
- Phylum: Chordata
- Subphylum: Tunicata
- Class: Thaliacea
- Order: Doliolida
- Family: Doliolidae
- Genus: Doliolina; Borgert, 1894

= Doliolina =

Genus of tunicates

Doliolina is a genus of tunicates belonging to the family Doliolidae.

The species of this genus are found in Southern Hemisphere.

Species:

- Doliolina indica (Neumann, 1906)
- Doliolina intermedia (Neumann, 1906)
- Doliolina krohni Herdman, 1888
- Doliolina muelleri (Krohn, 1852)
- Doliolina mulleri Krohn, 1852
- Doliolina obscura Tokioka & Berner, 1958
- Doliolina resistibilis (Neumann, 1913)
- Doliolina separata (Tokioka & Berner, 1958)
- Doliolina sigmoides Garstang, 1933
- Doliolina undulata Tokioka & Berner, 1958
