= Paradoliopsidae =

Scientific classification
- Domain: Eukaryota
- Kingdom: Animalia
- Phylum: Chordata
- Subphylum: Tunicata
- Class: Thaliacea
- Order: Doliolida
- Suborder: Doliopsidina
- Family: Paradoliopsidae; Godeaux, 1996

Family of tunicates

Paradoliopsidae is a family of tunicates belonging to the order Doliolida.

Genera:

- Paradoliopsis Godeaux, 1996
