= Doliolula =

Scientific classification
- Domain: Eukaryota
- Kingdom: Animalia
- Phylum: Chordata
- Subphylum: Tunicata
- Class: Thaliacea
- Order: Doliolida
- Family: Doliopsidae
- Genus: Doliolula; Godeaux, 1996
- Species: D. equus

Binomial name
- Doliolula equus Robison, Raskoff & Sherlock, 2005

Genus of tunicates

Doliolula is a genus of tunicates belonging to the family Doliopsidae. It is monotypic, being represented by the single species Doliolula equus.
