= Hartmeyer =

Hartmeyer may refer to:

- Hartmeyer Ice Arena, a multi-purpose arena in Madison, Wisconsin, United States
- Helen Camille Stanley Hartmeyer (born 1930), composer and violist
- Robert Hartmeyer (1874–1923), a German zoologist
