= Dolioletta =

Scientific classification
- Domain: Eukaryota
- Kingdom: Animalia
- Phylum: Chordata
- Subphylum: Tunicata
- Class: Thaliacea
- Order: Doliolida
- Family: Doliolidae
- Genus: Dolioletta; Borgert, 1894

Species
- See text

Genus of tunicates

Dolioletta is a genus of tunicates in the family Doliolidae.

== Characteristics ==
Members of the genus Dolioletta are transparent, gelatinous barrel-shaped animals, usually less than one centimetre long. They move in jerks by contracting the circular bands of muscle in their body wall sharply.

== Biology ==
They have the complex life cycle typical of the doliolids, with alternating sexual and asexual phases. They use a net of mucus strands to efficiently trap phytoplankton floating past. They both grow fast and multiply rapidly and a single animal is capable of forming thousands of new individuals in a few days. They sometimes form dense swarms with up to 500 individuals per square metre.

== Species ==
The World Register of Marine Species lists the following species:

- Dolioletta chuni (Neumann, 1906)
- Dolioletta gegenbauri (Uljanin, 1884)
- Dolioletta mirabilis Korotneff, 1891
- Dolioletta tritonis Herdman, 1888
- Dolioletta valdiviae (Neumann, 1906)
