= Doliolunidae =

Scientific classification
- Domain: Eukaryota
- Kingdom: Animalia
- Phylum: Chordata
- Subphylum: Tunicata
- Class: Thaliacea
- Order: Doliolida
- Suborder: Doliopsidina
- Family: Doliolunidae

Family of tunicates

Doliolunidae is a family of tunicates belonging to the order Doliolida.

Genera:

- Pseudusa Robison, Raskoff & Sherlock, 2005
