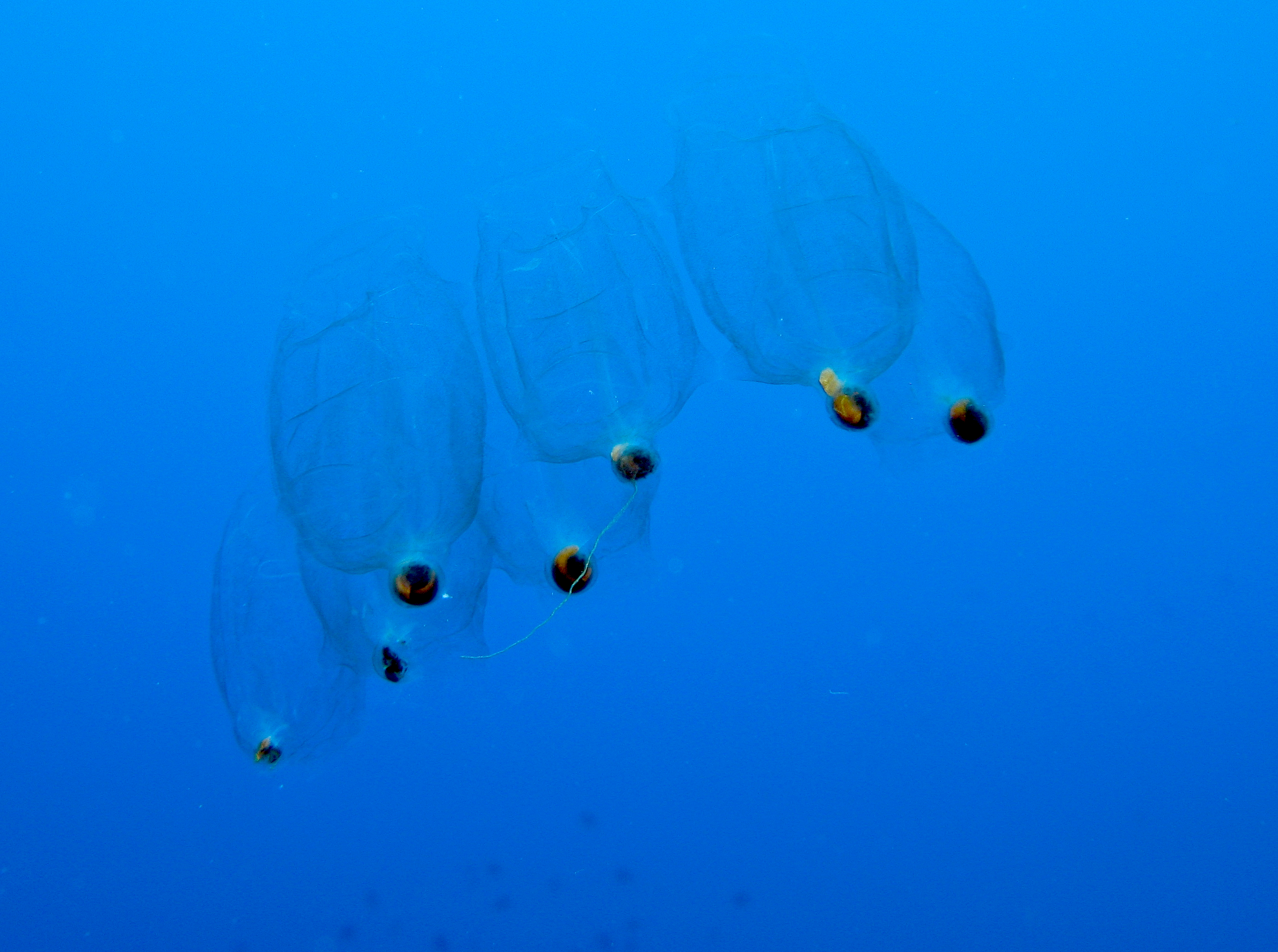

Scientific classification
- Kingdom: Animalia
- Phylum: Chordata
- Subphylum: Tunicata
- Class: Thaliacea
- Order: Doliolida
- Suborder: Doliolidina
- Family: Doliolidae; Bronn, 1862

= Doliolidae =

Family of tunicates

Doliolidae is a family of tunicates in the order Doliolida. Members of the family are pelagic and often found far away from coastlines.

Members of the family are transparent, gelatinous, barrel-shaped or cylindrical marine organisms. They are mostly small and inconspicuous. They have cilia which move water through the mucus nets which they use to trap the phytoplankton on which they feed. This is in contrast to their close relations, the salps, which use contractions of transverse muscles in the body wall for this purpose. Doliolids also have circular muscles, the sudden contraction of which cause them to move rapidly in a characteristic jerky manner.

They have a complex life cycle, as do other doliolids, with forms that alternate between generations that undergo sexual and asexual reproduction.

== Genera ==
The World Register of Marine Species lists the following genera and species:

- Dolioletta Borgert, 1894
  - Dolioletta chuni (Neumann, 1906)
  - Dolioletta gegenbauri (Uljanin, 1884)
  - Dolioletta mirabilis Korotneff, 1891
  - Dolioletta tritonis Herdman, 1888
  - Dolioletta valdiviae (Neumann, 1906)
- Doliolina Garstang, 1933
- Dolioloides Garstang, 1933
- Doliolum Quoy & Gaimard, 1834
  - Doliolum denticulatum Quoy & Gaimard, 1834
  - Doliolum intermedium Neumann, 1906
  - Doliolum nationalis Borgert, 1894
