= Doliopsoididae =

Scientific classification
- Domain: Eukaryota
- Kingdom: Animalia
- Phylum: Chordata
- Subphylum: Tunicata
- Class: Thaliacea
- Order: Doliolida
- Suborder: Doliolidina
- Family: Doliopsoididae; Godeaux, 1996

Family of tunicates

Doliopsoididae is a family of tunicates belonging to the order Doliolida.

Genera:

- Doliopsoides Krüger, 1939
