= Pyrosomella =

Scientific classification
- Kingdom: Animalia
- Phylum: Chordata
- Subphylum: Tunicata
- Class: Thaliacea
- Order: Pyrosomatida
- Family: Pyrosomatidae
- Subfamily: Pyrosomatinae
- Genus: Pyrosomella van Soest, 1979

Species
- Pyrosomella verticillata (Neumann, 1909); Pyrosomella operculata (Neumann, 1909)

Genus of tunicates

Pyrosomella is a genus of pyrosome that is usually smaller than other pyrosoma.

== Description ==
They range from less than a centimeter to several meters long. They are most commonly pink but can occasionally be orange.

== Food for other organisms ==
Pyrosomella(s) are food sources for many decapods like shrimp, both when living and dead. When dead they can sink to the depths, and be eaten by sea cucumbers, like sea pigs.

== Habitat ==
Pyrosomella(s) are native to Antarctica, Oceana, South Asia and East Asia.
