= Doliopsis =

Scientific classification
- Domain: Eukaryota
- Kingdom: Animalia
- Phylum: Chordata
- Subphylum: Tunicata
- Class: Thaliacea
- Order: Doliolida
- Family: Doliopsidae
- Genus: Doliopsis; Vogt, 1854

Genus of tunicates

Doliopsis is a genus of tunicates belonging to the family Doliopsidae.

Species:

- Doliopsis bahamensis (Godeaux, 1998)
- Doliopsis rubescens Vogt, 1854
