= Palmicellaria =

Palmicellaria Temporal range: Eocene - Recent

Scientific classification
- Kingdom: Animalia
- Phylum: Bryozoa
- Class: Gymnolaemata
- Order: Cheilostomatida
- Family: Celleporidae
- Genus: Palmicellaria; Alder, 1864

Species
- Palmicellaria elegans; Palmicellaria skenei; Palmicellaria tenuis

Genus of moss animals

Palmicellaria is a genus of bryozoans in the family Celleporidae. Some species are known from the fossil record.

== See also ==
- List of prehistoric bryozoan genera
