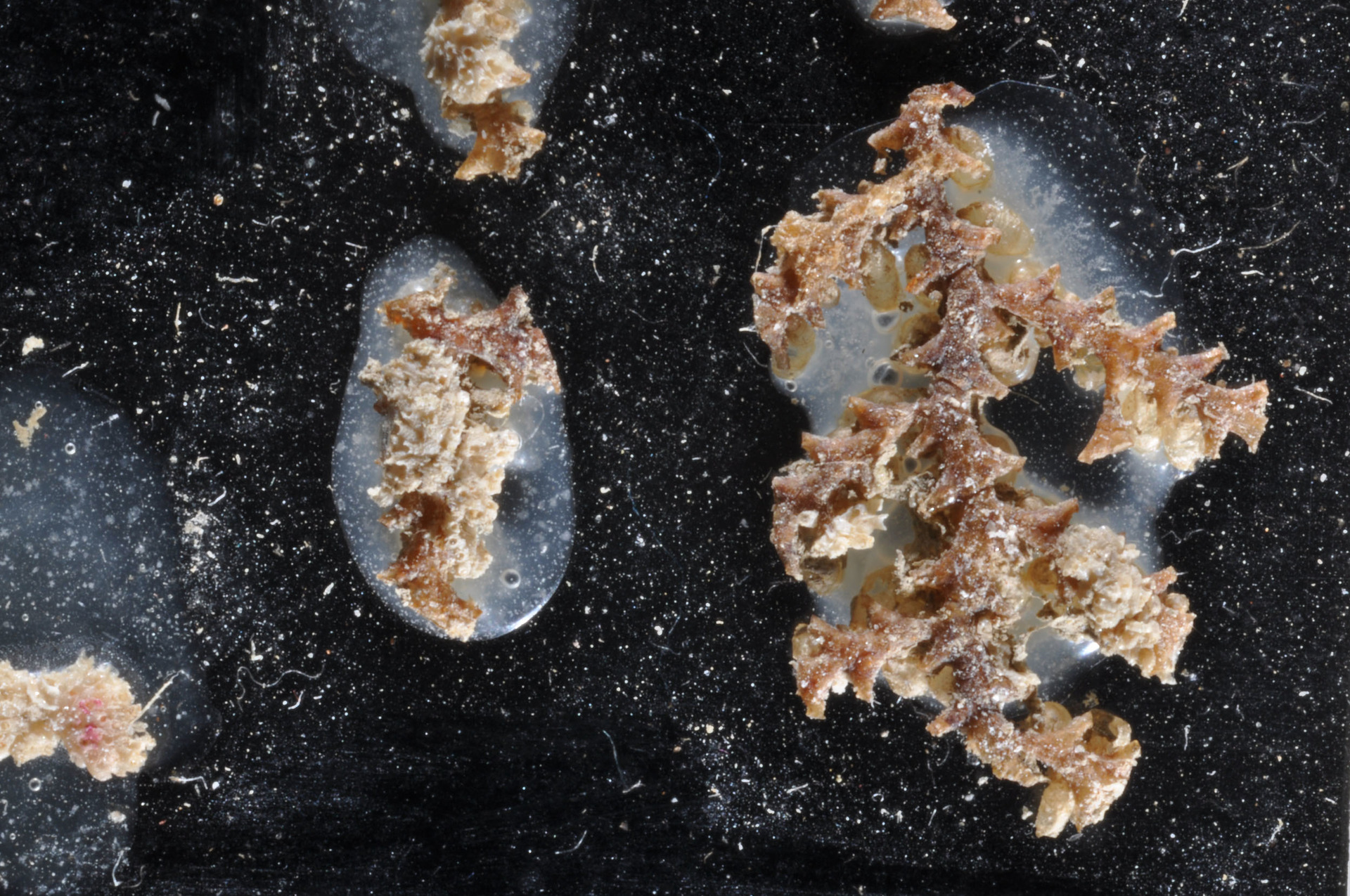
- Lagenipora socialis

Scientific classification
- Kingdom: Animalia
- Phylum: Bryozoa
- Class: Gymnolaemata
- Order: Cheilostomatida
- Family: Celleporidae
- Genus: Lagenipora; Hincks, 1877

= Lagenipora =

Genus of bryozoans

Lagenipora is a genus of bryozoans belonging to the family Celleporidae.

The genus has almost cosmopolitan distribution.

Species:

- Lagenipora americana Canu & Bassler, 1920
- Lagenipora ampullacea (Roemer, 1863)
- Lagenipora aragoi Marcus, 1955
- Lagenipora brevicollis Canu & Bassler, 1923
- Lagenipora chedopadiensis Guha & Gopikrishna, 2007
- Lagenipora crenulata Gordon, 1984
- Lagenipora daishakaensis Hayami, 1975
- Lagenipora echinacea Marcus, 1922
- Lagenipora ferocissima Gordon, 1984
- Lagenipora gigantea Canu, 1908
- Lagenipora laevissima Gordon, 1984
- Lagenipora lepralioides (Norman, 1868)
- Lagenipora minuscula Canu, 1911
- Lagenipora perforata Canu & Bassler, 1929
- Lagenipora pinnacula (Hayward, 1980)
- Lagenipora polita Jullien, 1903
- Lagenipora rugosa Cipolla, 1928
- Lagenipora sciutoi Di Martino & Taylor, 2015
- Lagenipora soldanii Neviani, 1907
- Lagenipora spinifera O'Donoghue, 1924
- Lagenipora tuba (Manzoni, 1875)
- Lagenipora tubulosa (d'Orbigny, 1852)
- Lagenipora urceolaris (Goldfuss, 1862)
- Lagenipora ventricosa Canu & Bassler, 1928
