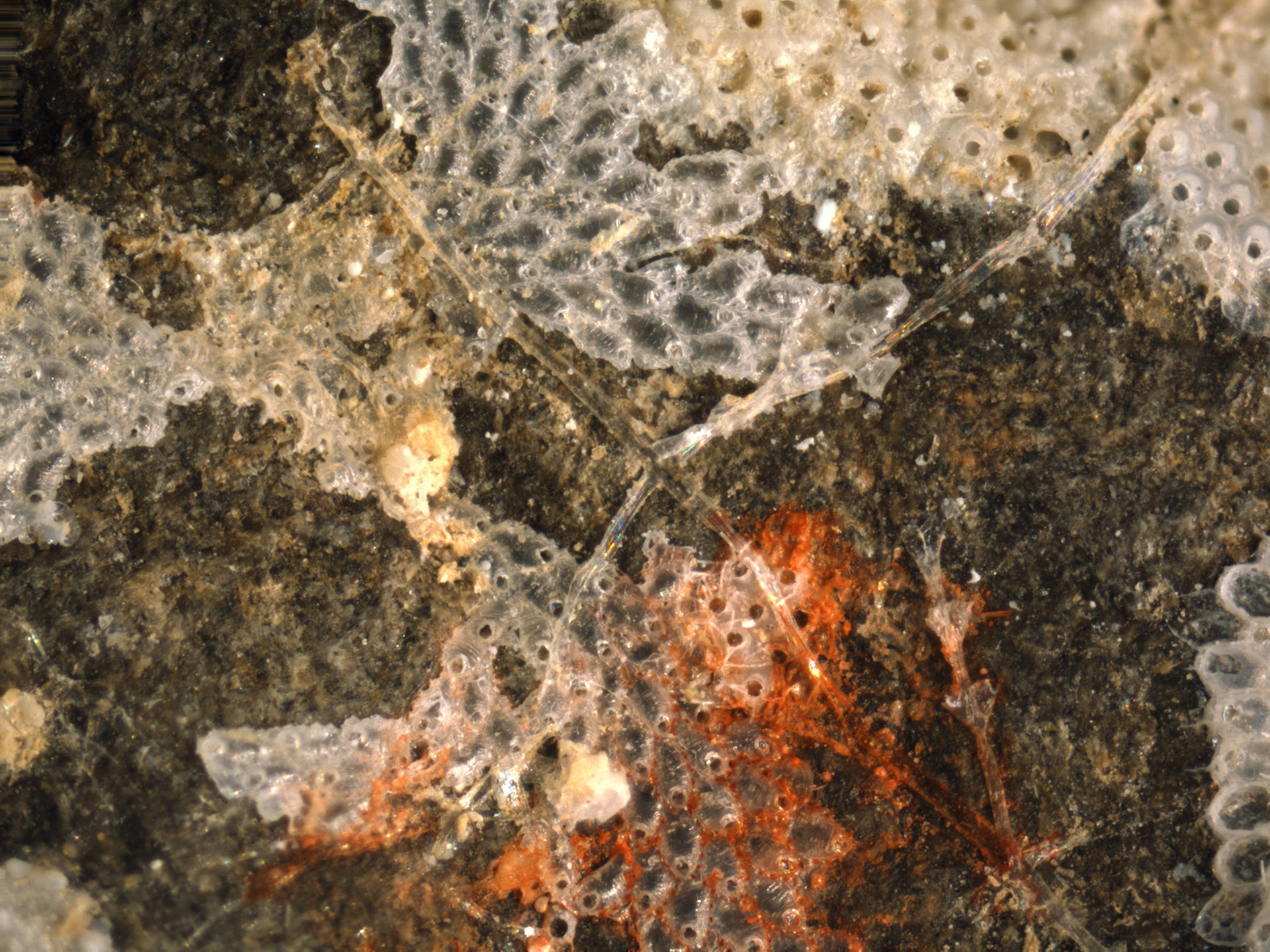
- Celleporina sp.

Scientific classification
- Kingdom: Animalia
- Phylum: Bryozoa
- Class: Gymnolaemata
- Order: Cheilostomatida
- Family: Celleporidae
- Genus: Celleporina; Gray, 1848

= Celleporina =

Genus of bryozoans

Celleporina is a genus of bryozoans belonging to the family Celleporidae.

The genus has almost cosmopolitan distribution.

Species:

- Celleporina abstrusa Winston & Vieira, 2013
- Celleporina algarvensis Souto, Reverter-Gil & De Blauwe, 2014
- Celleporina antiqua (Canu & Bassler, 1920)
