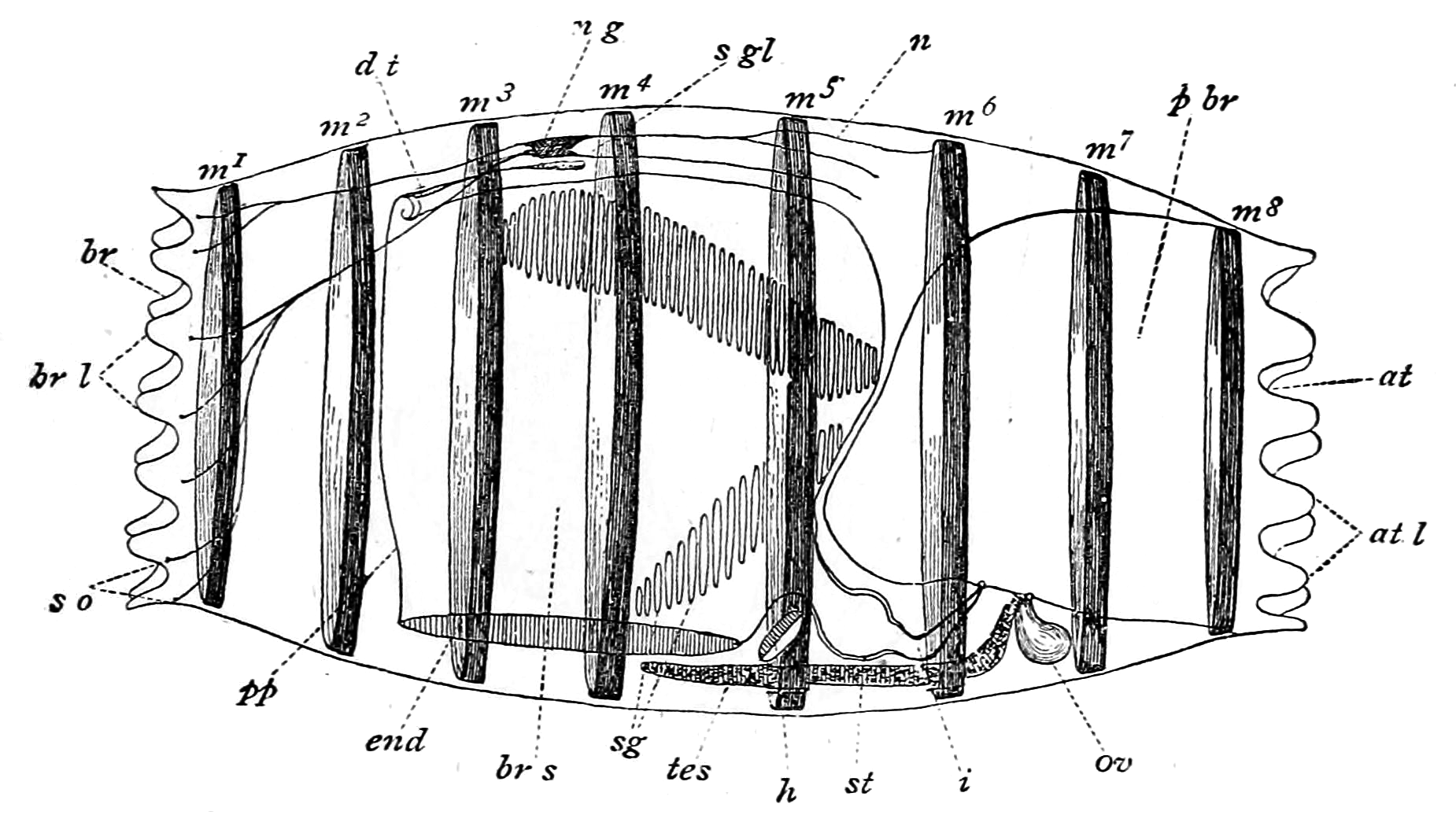
- Doliolum denticulatum; sexual generation, from the left side: m1-m8: muscle bands; at) atrial apertures; br) branchial apertures; br s) branchial sac; sg) stigmata; st) stomach; ng) nerve ganglion; so) sense organs

Scientific classification
- Domain: Eukaryota
- Kingdom: Animalia
- Phylum: Chordata
- Subphylum: Tunicata
- Class: Thaliacea
- Order: Doliolida
- Family: Doliolidae
- Genus: Doliolum

Species
- See text

= Doliolum =

Genus of tunicates

Doliolum is a genus of tunicates, the members of which move via jet propulsion. A detailed description can be found in the article, "On the anatomical structure of the trophozooid of Doliolum denticulatum."

== Species ==
The World Register of Marine Species lists the following species:

- Doliolum denticulatum Quoy & Gaimard, 1834
- Doliolum intermedium Neumann, 1906
- Doliolum nationalis Borgert, 1894
