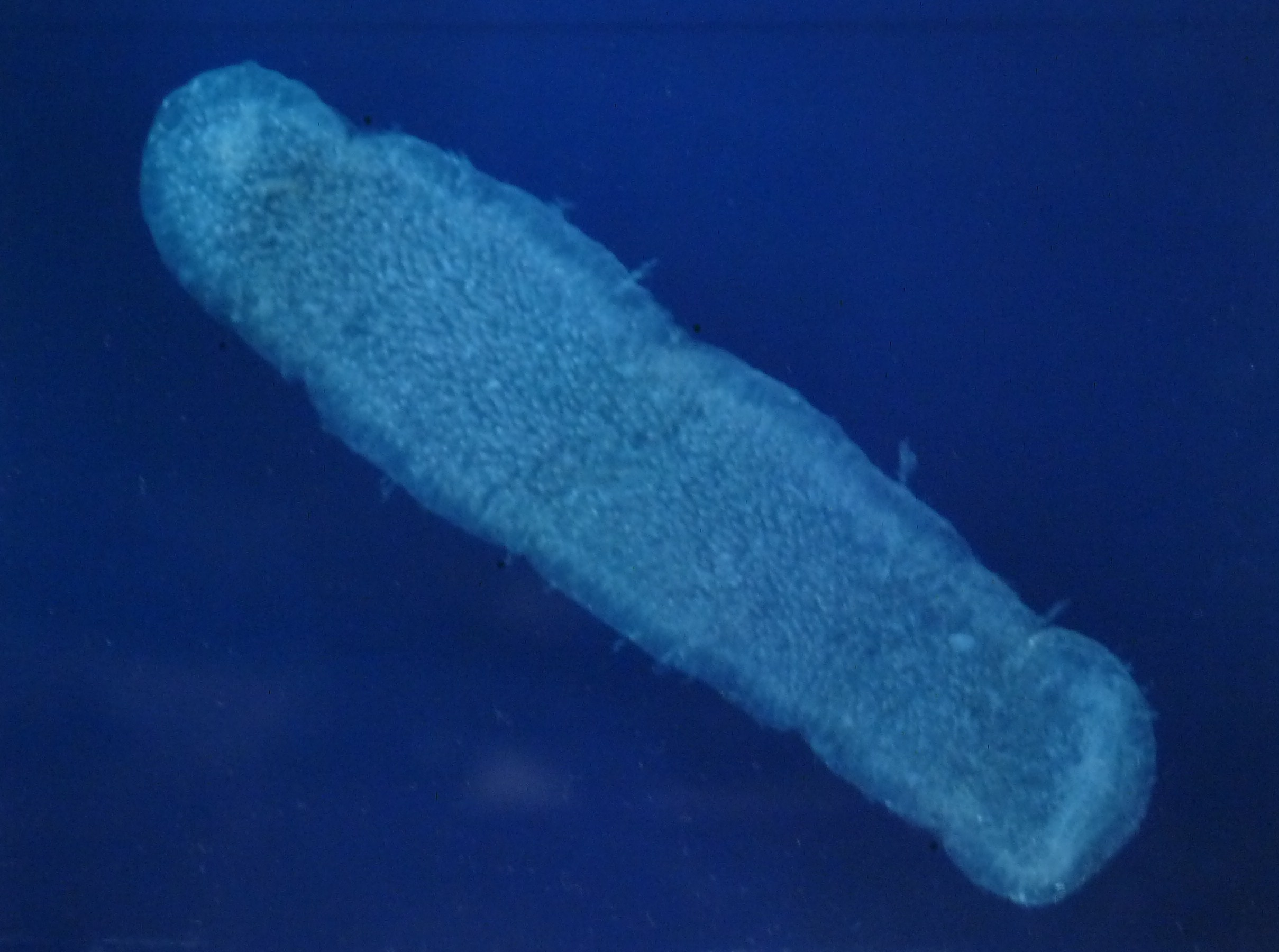

Scientific classification
- Kingdom: Animalia
- Phylum: Chordata
- Subphylum: Tunicata
- Class: Thaliacea
- Order: Pyrosomatida
- Family: Pyrosomatidae
- Genus: Pyrosoma
- Species: P. atlanticum

Binomial name
- Pyrosoma atlanticum Péron, 1804

Synonyms
- List: Dipleurosoma ellipticum Brooks, 1906; Pyrosoma atlanticum dipleurosoma Metcalf & Hopkins, 1919; Pyrosoma atlanticum echinatum Metcalf & Hopkins, 1919; Pyrosoma atlanticum f. elegans Lesueur, 1815; Pyrosoma atlanticum hawaiiense Metcalf & Hopkins, 1919; Pyrosoma atlanticum intermedium Metcalf & Hopkins, 1919; Pyrosoma atlanticum paradoxum Metcalf & Hopkins, 1919; Pyrosoma atlanticum triangulum Neumann, 1913; Pyrosoma atlanticum var. giganteum Lesueur, 1815; Pyrosoma atlanticum var. levatum Seeliger, 1895; Pyrosoma atlanticum var. tuberculosum Seeliger, 1895; Pyrosoma benthica Monniot C. & Monniot F., 1966; Pyrosoma elegans Lesueur, 1813; Pyrosoma ellipticum (Brooks, 1906); Pyrosoma giganteum Lesueur, 1815; Pyrosoma giganteum var. atlanticum Péron, 1804; Pyrosoma rufum Quoy & Gaimard, 1824; Pyrosoma triangulum Neumann, 1909

= Pyrosoma atlanticum =

Species of tunicate

Pyrosoma atlanticum is a pelagic species of marine colonial tunicate in the class Thaliacea found in temperate waters worldwide. The name of the genus comes from the Greek words pyros meaning 'fire' and soma meaning 'body', referring to the bright bioluminescence sometimes emitted. The specific epithet atlanticum refers to the Atlantic Ocean, from where the first specimen of the species was collected for scientific description; it was described in 1804 by François Péron, a French naturalist.

== Description ==
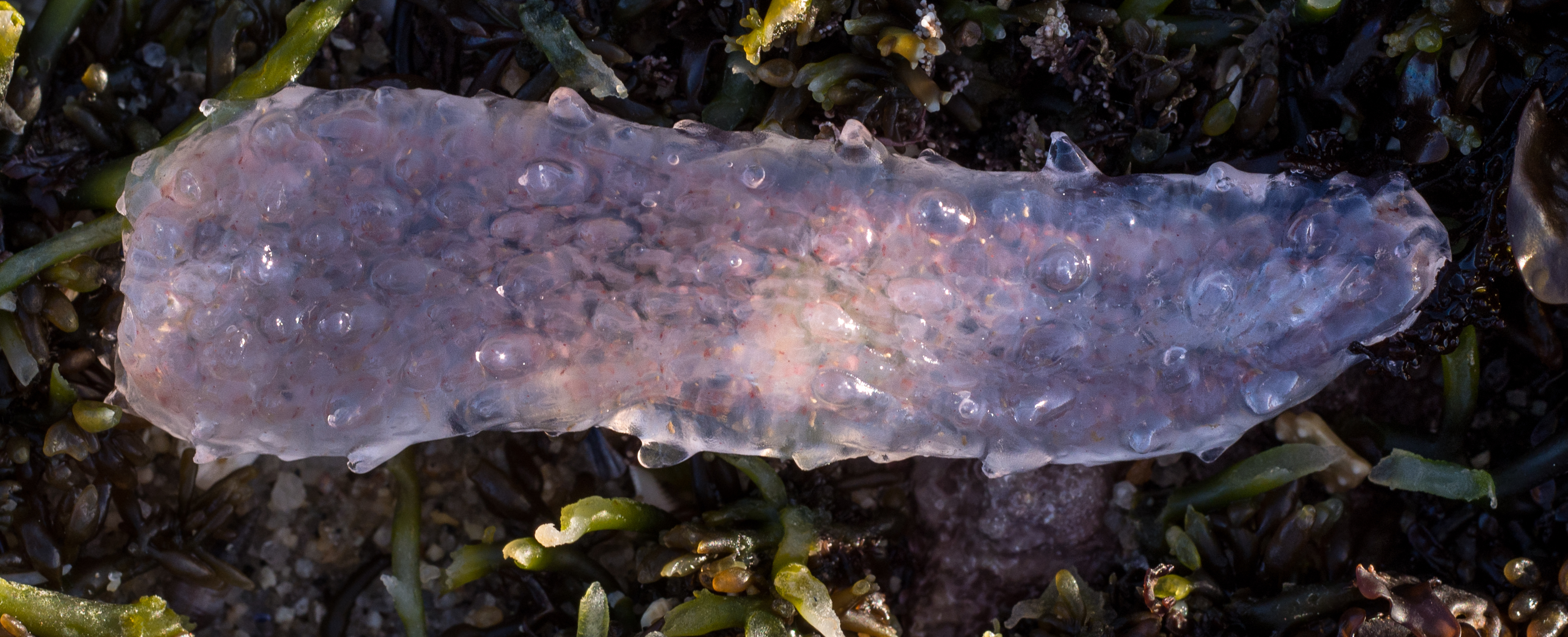
Pyrosoma atlanticum washed up on the beach in California

A colony of P. atlanticum is cylindrical and can grow up to 60 cm (2.0 ft) long and 4–6 cm (1.6–2.4 in) wide. The constituent zooids form a rigid tube, which may be pale pink, yellowish, or bluish. One end of the tube is narrower and is closed, while the other is open and has a strong diaphragm. The outer surface or test is gelatinised and dimpled with backward-pointing, blunt processes. The individual zooids are up to 8.5 mm (0.33 in) long and have a broad, rounded branchial sac with gill slits. Along the side of the branchial sac runs the endostyle, which produces mucus filters. Water is moved through the gill slits into the centre of the cylinder by cilia pulsating rhythmically. Plankton and other food particles are caught in mucus filters in the processes as the colony is propelled through the water. P. atlanticum is bioluminescent and can generate a brilliant blue-green light when stimulated.

== Distribution and habitat ==
P. atlanticum is found in temperate waters in all the world's oceans, usually between 50°N and 50°S. It is most plentiful at depths below 250 m (800 ft). Colonies are pelagic and move through the water column. They undergo a large diurnal migration, rising toward the surface in the evening and descending around dawn. Large colonies may rise through a vertical distance of 760 m (2,500 ft) daily, and even small colonies a few millimetres long can cover vertical distances of 90 m (300 ft).

== Biology ==
A study in the Indian Ocean comparing different zooplankton organisms found that colonies of P. atlanticum were the most efficient grazers of particles above 10 μm in diameter, catching a higher proportion of the particles than other grazers. This implies the species uses high biomass intake as a strategy, rather than investing in energy-conservation mechanisms.

Growth occurs by new rings of zooids being budded off around the edge of the elongating colony. A pair of luminescent organs is on either side of the inlet siphon of each zooid. When stimulated, these turn on and off, causing rhythmic flashing. No neural pathway runs between the zooids, but each responds to the light produced by other individuals, and even by light from other nearby colonies.

P. atlanticum remains as one of the least studied planktonic grazers, according to a 2021 study. In the study, the researchers took samples of the pyrosome's microbiome. The results of the study found that a possible source of bioluminescence in P. atlanticum is the abundance of Photobacterium in its microbiome. However, there is still debate, as a 2020 study found a potential endogenous pyrosome luciferase in the organism's transcriptome homologous to Renilla luciferase (RLuc). Further study of the luciferase showed that it reacted with coelenterazine to produce light, much like RLuc.

== Ecology ==
Five specimens of the penaeid shrimp Funchalia were found living inside colonies of P. atlanticum. Other amphipods also lived there, including the hyperiids Phronima and Phronimella spp.

Predators of P. atlanticum include various bony fishes, such as the spiky oreo, the big-eyed cardinalfish, and the pelagic butterfish, dolphins, and whales such as the sperm whale and giant beaked whale.

== Synonyms ==
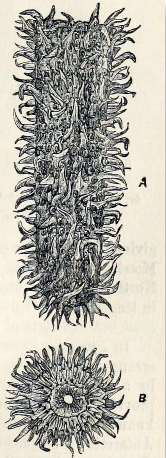
A. side view of the entire colony; B. end view of an open extremity

The following synonyms have been noted:

- Dipleurosoma ellipticum Brooks, 1906 – genus transfer and junior synonym
- Pyrosoma atlanticum dipleurosoma Metcalf & Hopkins, 1919 – junior synonym
- Pyrosoma atlanticum echinatum Metcalf & Hopkins, 1919 – junior synonym
- Pyrosoma atlanticum f. elegans Lesueur, 1815 – junior synonym
- Pyrosoma atlanticum hawaiiense Metcalf & Hopkins, 1919 – junior synonym
- Pyrosoma atlanticum intermedium Metcalf & Hopkins, 1919 – junior synonym
- Pyrosoma atlanticum paradoxum Metcalf & Hopkins, 1919 – junior synonym
- Pyrosoma atlanticum triangulum Neumann, 1913 – junior synonym
- Pyrosoma atlanticum var. giganteum Lesueur, 1815 – junior synonym
- Pyrosoma atlanticum var. levatum Seeliger, 1895 – junior synonym
- Pyrosoma atlanticum var. tuberculosum Seeliger, 1895 – junior synonym
- Pyrosoma benthica Monniot C. & Monniot F., 1966 – junior synonym
- Pyrosoma elegans Lesueur, 1813 – junior synonym
- Pyrosoma ellipticum (Brooks, 1906) – junior synonym
- Pyrosoma giganteum Lesueur, 1815 – junior synonym
- Pyrosoma giganteum var. atlanticum Péron, 1804 – status change
- Pyrosoma rufum Quoy & Gaimard, 1824 – junior synonym
- Pyrosoma triangulum Neumann, 1909 – junior synonym

== See also ==
- Jelly-falls
