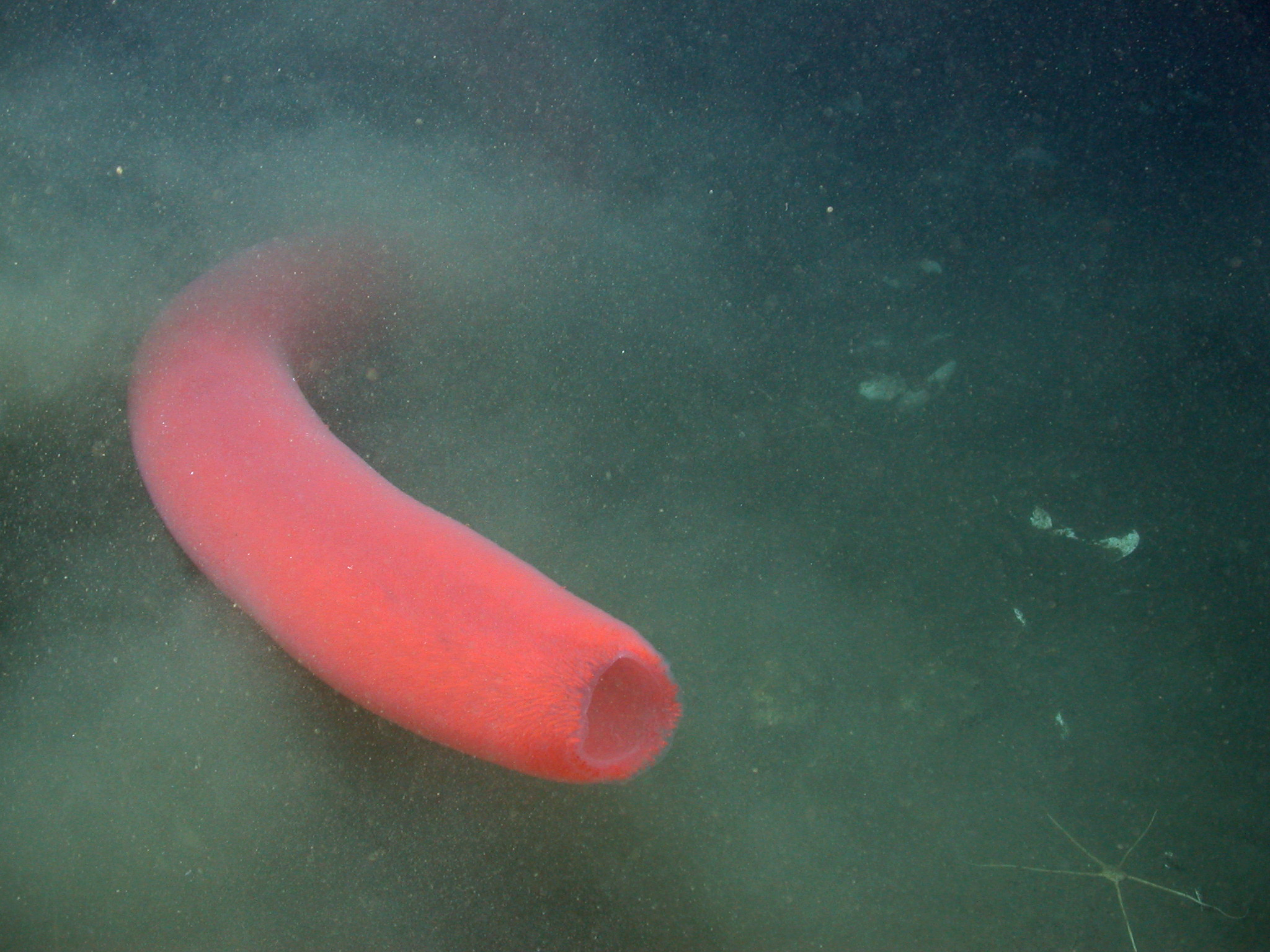
- Pyrostremma spinosum

Scientific classification
- Domain: Eukaryota
- Kingdom: Animalia
- Phylum: Chordata
- Subphylum: Tunicata
- Class: Thaliacea
- Order: Pyrosomatida
- Family: Pyrosomatidae
- Subfamily: Pyrostremmatinae
- Genus: Pyrostremma; Garstang, 1929

Type species
- Pyrostremma spinosum Herdman, 1888

Synonyms
- Propyrosoma Ivanova-Kazas, 1962; Pyrosoma (Pyrostremma) Garstang, 1929

= Pyrostremma =

Genus of tunicates

Pyrostremma is a genus of marine pyrosome containing 2 species.

== Taxonomy ==
Pyrostremma contains the following species:

- Pyrostremma agassizi (Ritter & Byxbee, 1905)
- Pyrostremma spinosum (Herdman, 1888)
