= Oswald Seeliger =

German zoologist (1858–1908)

Oswald Seeliger (14 May 1858 in Biala – 17 May 1908 in Leipzig) was a German zoologist, known for his studies involving the anatomy and developmental history of tunicates.

From 1877 he studied natural sciences at the universities of Leipzig, Jena and Vienna, receiving his doctorate from the latter institution in 1882. He took a study trip to southern France, Spain and North Africa, and from 1883 conducted research at the zoological station in Trieste. In 1886, he obtained his habilitation for zoology and comparative anatomy at the University of Berlin, and from 1898 to 1908 was a full professor at the University of Rostock. In 1903/04 he served as dean at the university.

He was a younger brother of astronomer Hugo von Seeliger (1849–1924).

== Selected works ==
- Zur entwicklungsgeschichte der Ascidien, 1882 – On the developmental history of ascidians.
- Die Knospung der Salpen, 1885 – The budding of salps.
- Zur entwickelungsgeschichte der Pyrosomen, 1889 – On the developmental history of pyrosomes.
- Bemerkungen über Bastardlarven der Seeigel, 1889 – Comments on bastard larvae of sea urchins.
- Bemerkungen zur Knospenentwicklung der Bryozoen, 1890 – Comments on bud development of bryozoans.
- Studien zur Entwicklungsgeschichte der Crinoiden (Antedon rosacea), 1892 – Studies on the developmental history of crinoids (Antedon rosacea).
- Die pyrosomen der Plankton-expedition, 1895 – Pyrosomes from the Plankton-Expedition.
- Tierleben der tiefsee, 1901 – Deepwater animal life.
- Über die Larven und Verwandtschaftsbeziehung der Bryozoen, 1906 – On the larvae and family relationship of bryozoans.
- Die Appendicularien und Ascidien, 1911 (with Robert Hartmeyer); Bronn, Heinrich G.: Klassen und Ordnungen des Tierreichs: wissenschaftlich dargestellt in Wort und Bild; Bd. 3: Mollusca und Tunicata, Supplement: Tunicata, Abt. I.: Ascidia. – The appendicularian and ascidian.
