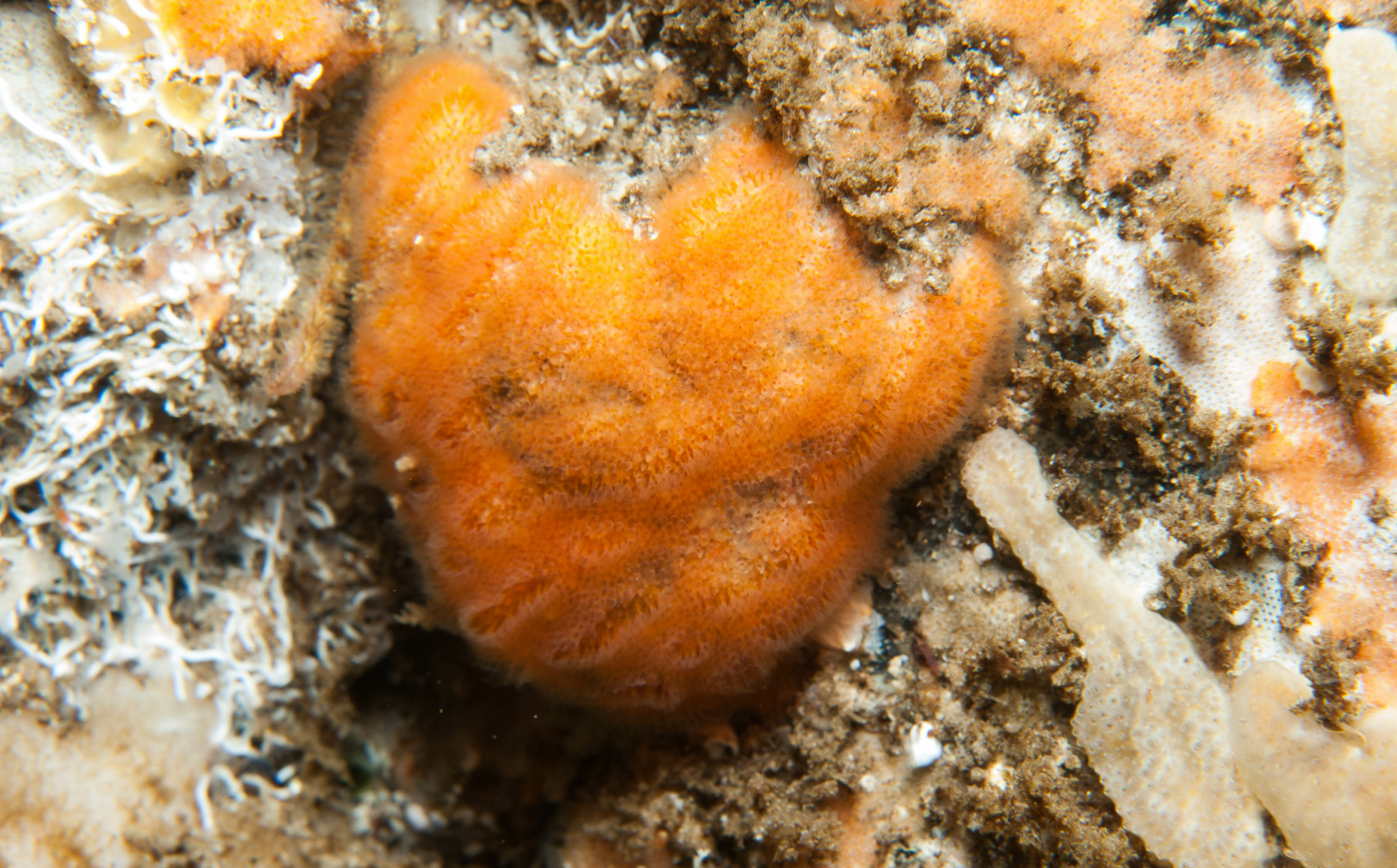
- Cellepora pumicosa photographed at Sula Sgeir, Scotland

Scientific classification
- Kingdom: Animalia
- Phylum: Bryozoa
- Class: Gymnolaemata
- Order: Cheilostomatida
- Suborder: Flustrina
- Superfamily: Celleporoidea
- Family: Celleporidae; Johnston, 1838

Genera
- See text

Synonyms
- Torquatellidae Tilbrook, 2006

= Celleporidae =

Celleporidae Temporal range: 235–0 Ma

Family of moss animals

Celleporidae is a family of bryozoans – colonial, aquatic, invertebrates – in the order Cheilostomatida. Structurally, they are defined by densely packed zooids (individual animals which make up the colony). The zooids usually have irregular direction, and are defined by morphological characteristics. Masses of the dead animals can form shallow sediments. Members of the family are recorded from every ocean, even around Antarctica, where they are represented primarily by the genus Osthimosia. Fossils of the family exist as old as from 235 million years ago, during the Triassic period.

== Genera ==
- Buffonellaria
- Buskea
- Calvipelta
- Cellepora
- Celleporina
- Chasmatooecium
- Chasmazoon
- Galeopsis
- Lagenipora
- Omalosecosa
- Orthoporidroides
- Osthimosia
- Palmicellaria
- Pourtalesella
- Predanophora
- Pseudocelleporina
- Richbunea
- Scorpiodinipora
- Sinuporina
- Spigaleos
- Tegminula
- Turbicellepora
