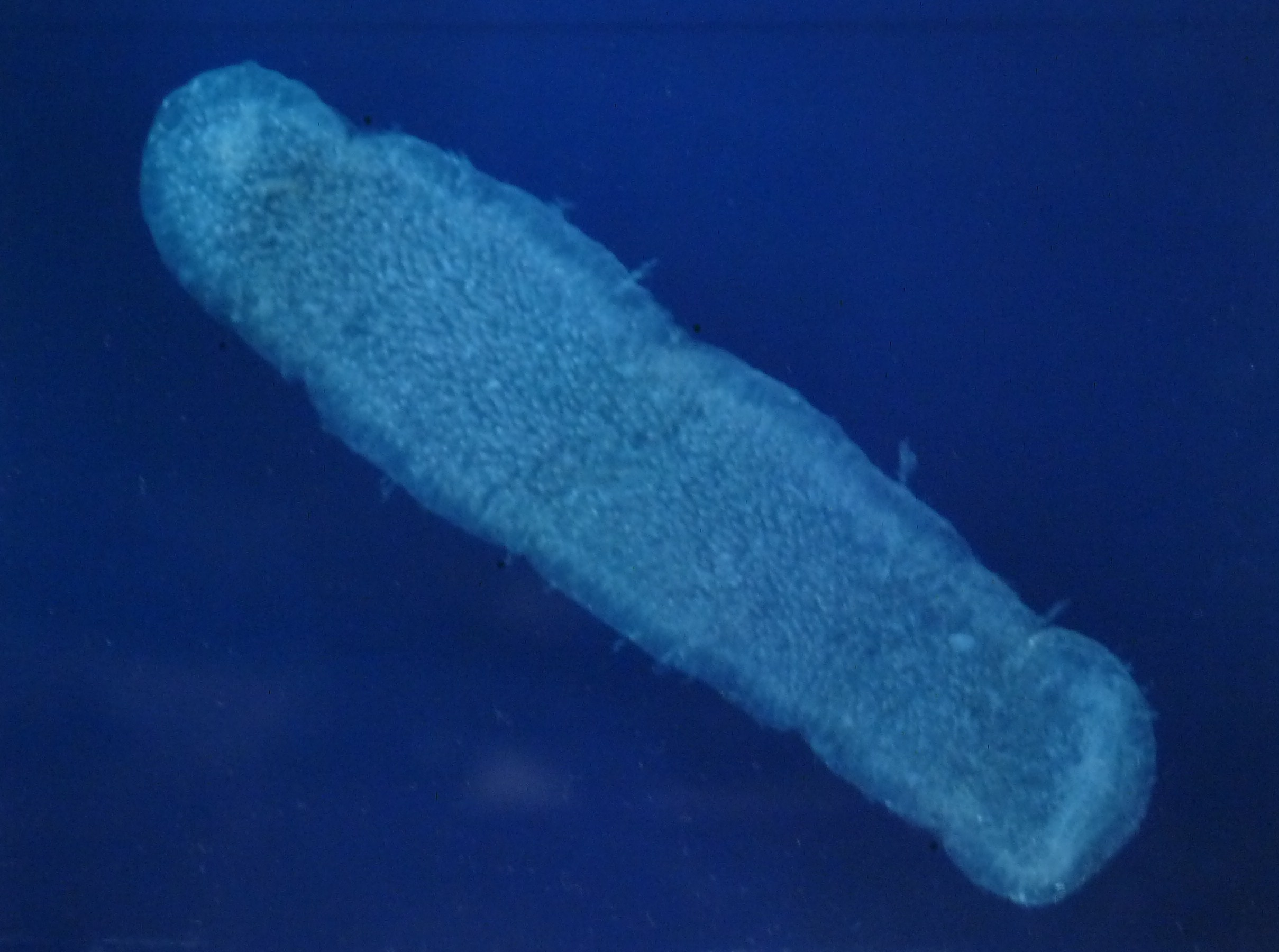
- Pyrosoma atlanticum

Scientific classification
- Kingdom: Animalia
- Phylum: Chordata
- Subphylum: Tunicata
- Class: Thaliacea
- Order: Pyrosomatida
- Family: Pyrosomatidae
- Subfamily: Pyrosomatinae
- Genus: Pyrosoma; Péron, 1804

Synonyms
- Dipleurosoma Brooks, 1906

= Pyrosoma =

Genus of tunicates

Pyrosoma is a genus of pyrosomes, marine colonial tunicates in the class Thaliacea. It contains four pelagic species found in temperate waters worldwide. Pyrosomes are filter feeders that uniquely use a type of continuous jet propulsion, generated by individual zooids, to slowly move forward while grazing; the species P. atlanticum has the highest known food clearance rate among zooplankton grazers. Colonies can reach lengths of up to 20 m (66 ft). Pyrosoma atlanticum has special light organs that contain glowing bacteria (Photobacterium sp.), and these bacteria make the colony glow blue-green in the ocean.

== Species ==
The genus contains four recognized species:

- Pyrosoma aherniosum Seeliger, 1895
- Pyrosoma atlanticum Péron, 1804
- Pyrosoma godeauxi van Soest, 1981
- Pyrosoma ovatum Neumann, 1909
