= Plankton Expedition =

Historic marine plankton expedition

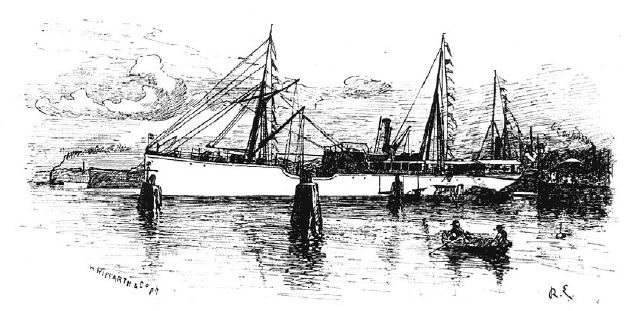
The steamer National prior to casting off on the expedition, on 14 July 1889 in Kiel

Launched in 1889, the Plankton Expedition was the first scientific effort to systematically study marine plankton—small, drifting aquatic organisms. Just as the earlier Challenger Expedition is considered to be the founding expedition of oceanography, the Plankton Expedition played a seminal role in establishing the quantitative and systematic study of plankton in the ocean.

== Inspiration and aims ==
Victor Hensen, a physiologist from Kiel University in Germany, first used the word “plankton” in 1887 to refer to those organisms in the ocean that drift with the currents, rather than moving around under their own power. Hensen’s aim in organizing the Plankton Expedition was to improve understanding of the relationship between plankton and fisheries, as he believed plankton to be the main food source for fish.

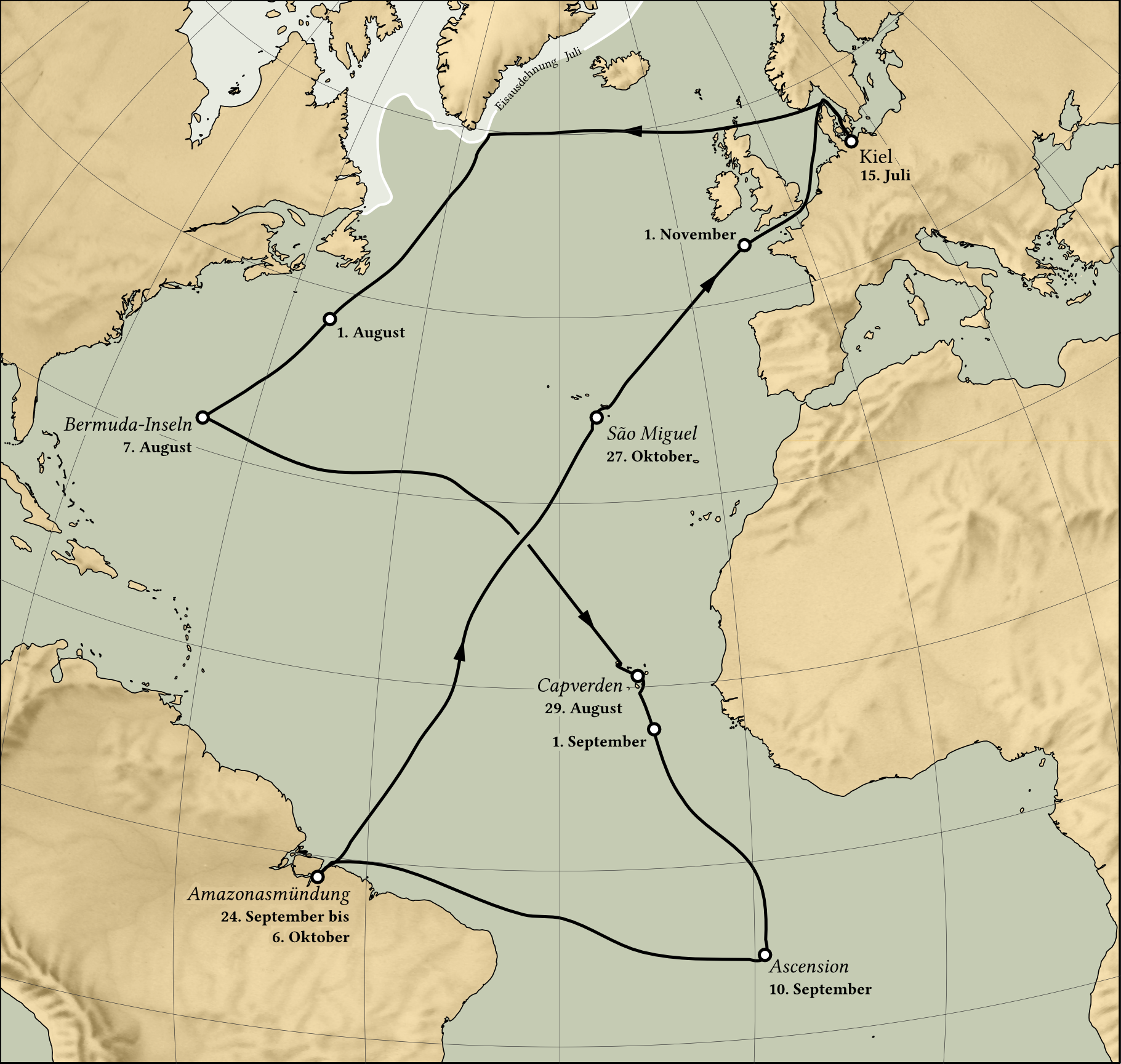
Figure 1. Route of the 1889 Plankton Expedition.

== Course, findings, and legacy ==
The Plankton Expedition was funded by the German government and private donors. In addition to Hensen, the expedition consisted of a team of five scientists and an artist: zoologist Frederick Dahl, physiologist and protistologist Karl Brandt, botanist Franz Schütt, geographer Otto Krümmel, and microbiologist Bernard Fischer, as well as artist Richard Eschke.

The crew steamed out on the National across major regions of the Atlantic (Figure 1) between July and November 1889, collecting plankton from over 100 stations down to a depth of 200m. Hensen’s major conclusions from the collections—that plankton abundance was too low to support fish populations and that plankton are evenly distributed in the ocean—have been shown to be inaccurate, being based on faulty collection methods. The expedition reports detailing the types of marine plankton collected are the legacy of the endeavor and are credited with the eventual development of the field of microbiology.
