= Robert Hartmeyer =

German zoologist (1874–1923)

Heinrich Hermann Robert Hartmeyer
- Born: May 19, 1874; Hamburg, Germany
- Died: October 13, 1923 (aged 49); Freiburg im Breisgau
- Occupation: Zoologist

Heinrich Hermann Robert Hartmeyer (born May 19, 1874 in Hamburg – died on October 13, 1923 in Freiburg im Breisgau) was a German zoologist.

From 1892 he studied medicine and biology at the University of Bonn; from 1895 he studied at the University of Leipzig with Rudolf Leuckart and at the University of Breslau (now Wrocław in Poland) with Willy Kükenthal. In 1898 he received his PhD at Breslau.

In 1899, he conducted marine zoological studies in Messina, at Stazione Zoologica in Naples and in Rovinj. In 1900, he became a research assistant. From 1908, he was curator at the Zoological Museum of the University of Berlin.

Since 1894, he was a member of the Corps Palatia Bonn.

== Works ==
- 1893 - H. G. Bronns Klassen und Ordnungen des Tierreichs: Bd. 3. Mollusca. Supplement. Tunicata (Manteltiere).. Die Appendicularien und Ascidien / begonnen von Osw. Seeliger, fortges. von R. Hartmeyer, Part 1 by Heinrich G. Bronn, Oswald Seeliger, Robert Hartmeyer and G. Neumann - 1773 pages
- 1899 - Conspectus faunæ groenlandicæ: Pars [prima] [tertia] by Hjalmar Ditlevsen, Tage Ulrich Holten Ellinger and Robert Hartmeyer
- 1899 - Die Monascidien der Bremer Expedition nach Ostspitzbergen im Jahre 1889 by Robert Hartmeyer - 70 pages
- 1899 - Papers on tunicates by Robert Hartmeyer
- 1900 - Memoirs on ascidians by Robert Hartmeyer
- 1900 - Monascidien von ternate by Robert Hartmeyer - 12 pages
- 1900 - Nachtrag zu Monascidien von Ternate by Robert Hartmeyer - 242 pages
- 1901 - Holosome Ascidien (Ascidiacea holosomata). by Robert Hartmeyer
- 1903 - Die Ascidien der Deutschen Sudpolar-Expedition, 1901–1903 by Robert Hartmeyer - 200 pages
- 1907 - Die Fauna Sudwest-Australiens, Ergebnisse der Hamburger sud-west-australischen Forschungsreise 1905, herausgegeben von Dr. W. Michaelsen und Dr. R. Hartmeyer, Volume 1 by Wilhelm Michaelsen and Robert Hartmeyer
- 1908 - Die Fauna Sudwest-Australiens V1: Ergebnisse Der Hamburger Sudwest-Australischen Forschungsreise 1905 (1908) by Johann Wilhelm Michaelson and Robert Hartmeyer
- 1909 - Blattidae by Robert Shelford, Wilhelm Michaelson, Robert Hartmeyer - 142 pages
- 1909 - Die westindischen Korallenriffe und ihr Tierleben by Robert Hartmeyer - 40 pages
- 1909 - Mollusca, Nemertini, Bryozoa, Turbellaria, Tricladida, Spongillidae, Hydrozoa by Johannes Thiele, Robert Hartmeyer and Ludwig von Graff - 199 pages
- 1909 - Nematodes, Mermithidae, Gordiidae by Leonard A. Jägerskiöld, V. Linstow and Robert Hartmeyer - 92 pages
- 1910 - The terrestrial mammals and birds of north-east Greenland: biological observations by A. L. V. Manniche, Frits Johansen and Robert Hartmeyer - 236 pages
- 1911 - Die Ascidien der deutschen Südpolar-Expedition 1901–1903: mit Taf. 45-57 by Robert Hartmeyer - 199 pages
- 1911 - Die Appendicularien und Ascidien by Oswald Seeliger, Heinrich Georg Bronn and Robert Hartmeyer - 952 pages
- 1911 - Die Fauna südwest-Australiens: Ergebnisse der Hamburger südwest-australischen Forschungsreise 1905, Volume 1 by Deutsche Südpolar-Expedition, Robert Hartmeyer - 199 pages
- 1911 - Polycitor (Eudistoma) mayeri nov. sp., from the Tortugas by Robert Hartmeyer - 5 pages
- 1912 - Die Ascidien der Deutschen Tiefsee-Expedition by Robert Hartmeyer - 170 pages
- 1912 - Die ascidien der Danmark expedition by Robert Hartmeyer - 236 pages
- 1913 - Abt. II,1 by Oswald Seeliger, Heinrich Georg Bronn and Robert Hartmeyer - 182 pages
- 1913 - Revision von Heller's Ascidien aus der Adria II. Die Arten der Gattungen Microcosmus, Cynthia, Styela, Polycarpa, Gymnocystis und Molgula by Robert Hartmeyer - 37 pages
- 1914 - Ascidier by Robert Hartmeyer - 1117 pages
- 1915 - Alder und Hancocks Britische Tunicaten: eine Revision by Robert Hartmeyer - 39 pages
- 1915 - Results of a biological survey of Blacksod Bay, Co. Mayo by M. C. Knowles and R. Hartmeyer - 72 pages
- 1916 - Berichtigung zu: Clark, A. H., The Crinoids of the Museum für Naturkunde, Berlin by Robert Hartmeyer - 4 pages
- 1919 - Ascidien by Robert Hartmeyer - 150 pages
- 1919 - Ascidien aus dem Barentsmeer by Robert Hartmeyer
- 1919 - Results of Dr. E. Mjöbergs Swedish Scientific Expeditions to Australia 1910-13: Ascidien by Robert Hartmeyer - 150 pages
- 1921 - Studien an westgrönländischen Ascidien: (Ergebisse der Einsammlungen von Dr. V. Nordmann in Nordre Strømfjord, Sommer 1911 und Dr. K. Stephensen in Kvarnefjord, Bredefjord und Skovfjord, Sommer 1912) by Robert Hartmeyer - 137 pages
- 1922 - Die Ascidienfauna des Trondhjemfjords by Robert Hartmeyer - 47 pages
- 1924 - Ascidiacae: Part 2 by Robert Hartmeyer - 275 pages
- 1924 - Ascidiacea: zugleich eine Übersicht über die arktische und boreale Ascidienfauna auf tiergeographischer Grundlage by Robert Hartmeyer - 640 pages
- 1929 - Ergebnisse einer zoologischen Forschungsreise nach Westindien im Jahre 1907: ..., Volume 1 by Willy Kükenthal, Robert Hartmeyer - 234 pages
- Die Ascidien der Arktis by Robert Hartmeyer - 320 pages
- Etwas über Schreibungen von Gattungsnamen by Robert Hartmeyer
- Miscellanea ascidiologica by Robert Hartmeyer
- Neue und alte Styeliden aus der Sammlung des Berliner Museums by Robert Hartmeyer
- Nomenclator animalium generum et subgenerum
- Zur Kenntnis phlebobranchiater und diktyobranchiater Ascidien by Robert Hartmeyer and Wilhelm Michaelsen.
