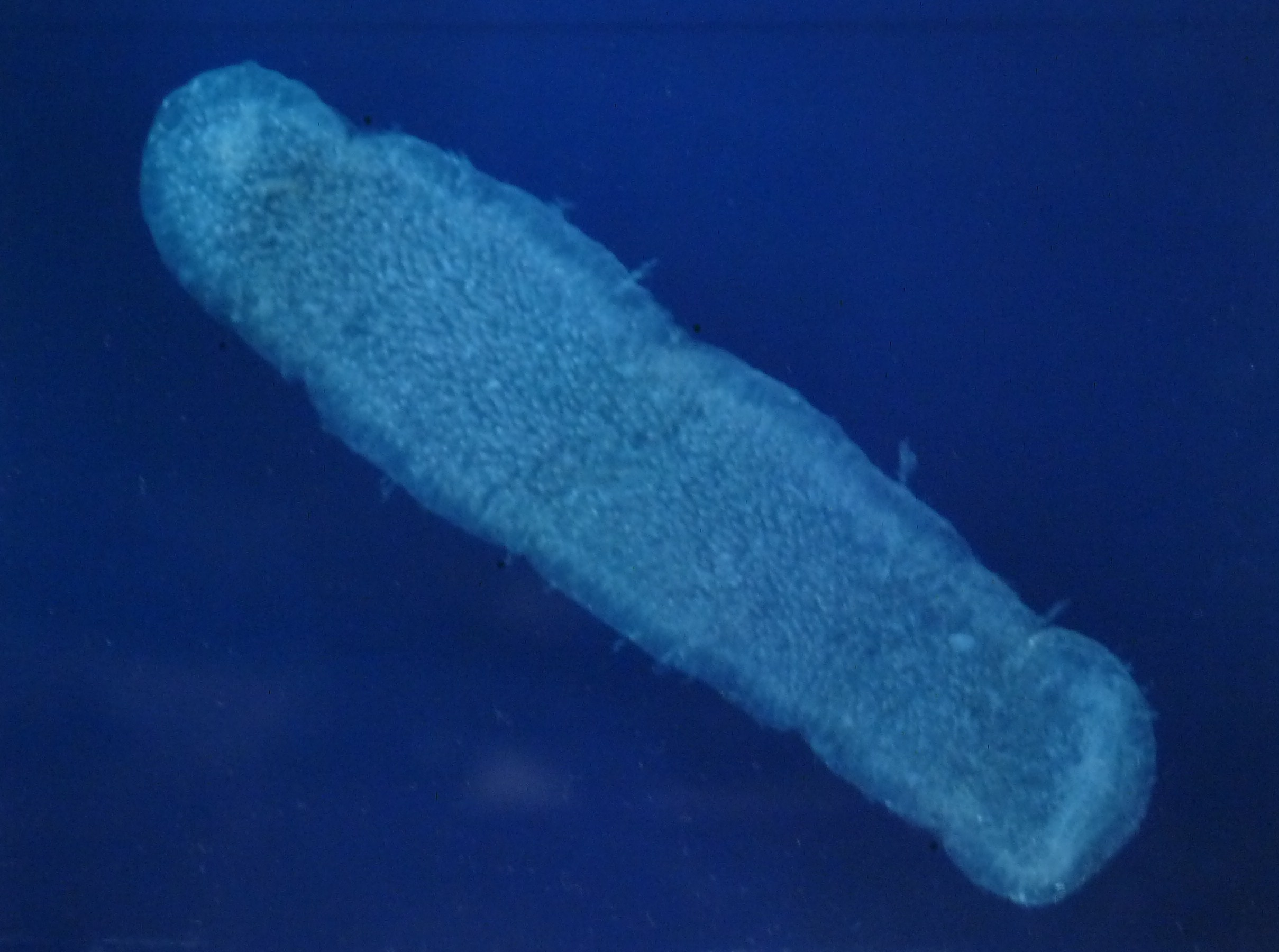
- Pyrosoma atlanticum

Scientific classification
- Kingdom: Animalia
- Phylum: Chordata
- Subphylum: Tunicata
- Class: Thaliacea
- Order: Pyrosomatida; Jones, 1848
- Family: Pyrosomatidae; Lahille, 1888

Genera
- Pyrosoma Péron, 1804; Pyrosomella van Soest, 1979; Pyrostremma Garstang, 1929

= Pyrosome =

Pyrosomatidae Temporal range: Neogene–Present

Family of tunicates

Pyrosomes are free-floating colonial tunicates in family Pyrosomatidae. Pyrosomes consist of colonies of small zooids. There are three genera, Pyrosoma, Pyrosomella and Pyrostremma, and eight species. They usually live in the upper layers of the open ocean in warm seas, although some may be found at greater depths. Pyrosomes exhibit bioluminescence, and the name Pyrosoma derives from the Greek words pyro, meaning "fire", and soma, meaning "body". Pyrosomes are hermaphroditic and reproduce via a two-part process. They have the ability to create massive blooms that may affect pelagic food webs.

== Description ==
Pyrosomes are commonly called "sea pickles", due to their tube-like gelatinous structure. Other nicknames include "sea worms", "sea squirts", "fire bodies", and "cockroaches of the sea".

Each zooid opens both to the inside and outside of the "tube". The zooids draw in ocean water from the outside into their internal filtering mesh called the branchial basket, extracting the microscopic plant cells on which it feeds, and then expelling the filtered water to the inside of the colony's cylinder.

Pyrosomes are planktonic, which means their movements are largely controlled by currents, tides, and waves in the oceans. On a smaller scale, however, each colony can move itself slowly by the process of jet propulsion, created by the coordinated beating of cilia in the branchial baskets of all the zooids, which also create feeding currents.

Pyrosomes are brightly bioluminescent, flashing a pale blue-green light that can be seen for many tens of metres. Pyrosomes are closely related to salps, and are sometimes called "fire salps". Sailors on the ocean occasionally observe calm seas containing many pyrosomes, all luminescing on a dark night.

Pyrosomes feed through filtration and they are among the most efficient filter feeders of any zooplankton species. These colonial tunicates also are known to provide a source of shelter, food, and settlement from other deep sea organisms. They are also known to play a role in the marine Carbon cycle, as dead colonies sink to the sea floor to be consumed as food by other animals.

== Anatomy and morphology ==
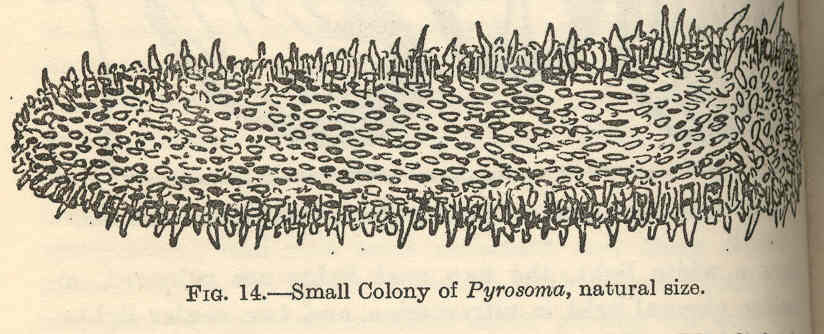
Drawing of a pyrosome. Clearly shows the individual zooids that appear as small bumps on the surface of the tubular structure.

A single individual of a pyrosome colony is referred to as an ascidiozooid, or zooid. A pyrosome colony contains many zooids which form a gelatinous tube, the walls of which range from 0.2 - 2.0 cm.

The zooids that make up a pyrosome are typically only a few mm long. Colonies of these zooids, which are bound together by a tunic of shared tissue, form a tube-like, hollow structure that is typically between 1 inch and 2 feet in length. However, giant pyrosomes can reach up to 60 feet in length, with a hollow opening up to 6 feet (2 meters) wide. There have been some instances in which deep sea scientists have swum inside of a giant pyrosome's hollow body.

Pyrosomes are transparent and gelatinous, with a slimy yet bumpy texture. Zooids appear as small bumps on the colony, although the colony appears nearly smooth with perforated holes for each zooid on the inside. Each zooid has a stomach that can be seen through the transparent body of the colony. These stomachs have been compared to "wire baskets".

== Bioluminescence ==
Although many planktonic organisms are bioluminescent, pyrosome bioluminescence is unique due to the nature and origins of its brilliant light emissions. Pyrosomes often exhibit waves of light passing back and forth through the colony, as each individual zooid detects light and then emits light in response. These waves of bioluminescence are most likely a response to photic stimulation as opposed to nerve impulses, though zooids have also been observed emitting light in response to mechanical stimulation. Pyrosomes may use bioluminescence to signal danger or otherwise communicate with individuals of the same or nearby colonies.

Each zooid contains a pair of light organs located near the outside of the tunic, or the protective outer layer, whose cells are full of organelles containing intracellular, bioluminescent bacteria. This bacterial species has not been identified, but it is similar to other extracellular bioluminescent bacterial symbionts, and indeed to other intracellular bacterial symbionts. These bacteria live within the host cells, which assumably control bacterial light emissions, a phenomenon rarely seen in other bioluminescent marine organisms. Uncertainties about the overall control mechanisms and evolutionary relationship between Pyrosoma and their specialized symbionts constitute a research gap and are continuing to be studied.

== Reproduction ==
Pyrosomes are hermaphroditic and have a two-part life cycle. In the first stage, a fertilized egg develops into a cyathozooid. After this, the cyathazooid produces a tetrazooid, or four ascidizooids, via budding. Colonies are able to self fertilize from one end of the tube to the other, as the closed end of the lobe is protandrous, meaning that male gametes are produced before female, while the open end is protogynous, with the female gametes maturing before the male.

== Food chain niche ==
Pyrosomes are filter feeding tunicates that consume small particles like phytoplankton and detrital matter. That being said, their predator to prey mass ratio is very large at almost 50 million : 1. Predator to prey mass ratio refers to the ratio between the mass of the predator organism vs. the mass of the prey organism. In this instance, the pyrosomes are generally 50 million times larger in mass than the prey they consume. Generally, pyrosomes graze a wide variety of microbes. Most research focuses on larger eukaryotic phytoplankton; pyrosome feeding on smaller heterotrophic microbes is not well understood.

Pyrosomes are essential members of the food chain on multiple fronts. Pyrosomes feed on large numbers of microbes, fall after death, vertically migrate while producing marine snow, and are prey for marine mammals, seabirds, turtles, or fish. With these comes contribution to the marine carbon cycle. About 35% of the dry weight of Pyrosomes is carbon which is high for gelatinous organisms. During their daily vertical migration of up to 900m, and during falls after death, Pyrosomes are prey to at least 62 pelagic organisms (like turtles and sea lions) and at least 33 benthic organisms (like sea urchins and crabs). Therefore, their contribution to the marine carbon cycle is likely very substantial.

== Taxonomy ==
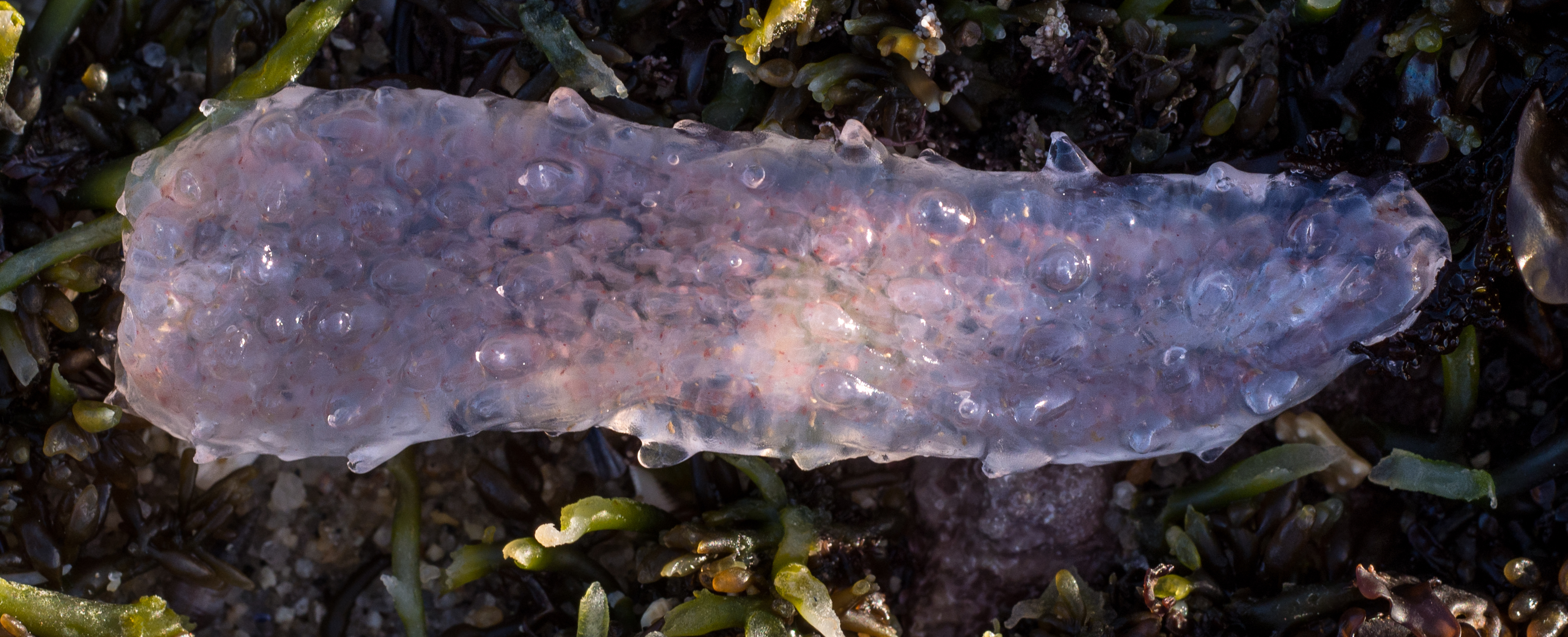
Pyrosoma atlanticum by a tide pool in California

According to the World Register of Marine Species, the family is divided into two subfamilies and three genera, containing eight species.

- Subfamily Pyrosomatinae Lahille, 1888
  - Genus Pyrosoma Péron, 1804
    - Pyrosoma aherniosum Seeliger, 1895
    - Pyrosoma atlanticum Péron, 1804
    - Pyrosoma godeauxi van Soest, 1981
    - Pyrosoma ovatum Neumann, 1909
  - Genus Pyrosomella van Soest, 1979
    - Pyrosomella operculata (Neumann, 1909)
    - Pyrosomella verticillata (Neumann, 1909)
- Subfamily Pyrostremmatinae van Soest, 1979
  - Genus Pyrostremma Garstang, 1929
    - Pyrostremma agassizi (Ritter & Byxbee, 1905)
    - Pyrostremma spinosum (Herdman, 1888)

The three genera of pyrosomes, Pyrostremma, Pyrosomella, and Pyrosoma, have morphological similarities and differences. Most pyrosome colonies are finger-shaped, but there are two exceptions in the Pyrosoma genera; P. godeauxi and P. ovatum have a more globular appearance. Generally, pyrosomes have limp tests, or outer coverings. However, in some cases, Pyrosoma have tough, elastic tests. Each genera has test projections, those of Pyrostremma being triangular and spiny, Pyrosomella smooth, and Pyrosoma long and blunt.

A colonial sphincter, or diaphragm, is present in Pyrosomella and Pyrosoma, but is absent in Pyrostremma. While Pyrostremma species have a slit-like arial sphincter, Pyrosoma and Pyrosomella have circular sphincters. The orientation of zooids differs between genera as well. In Pyrostremma, new zooids are added in a swirled pattern; Pyrosomella form zooids in parallel rows; Pyrosoma add zooids in a dense, random arrangement. Pyrosomes can also develop into some of the longest animals in the ocean. For example, the Pyrostremma spinosum, can fully extend up to 3 meters and grow up to 20 meters in length.

In regards to the three genera of pyrosomes, the cellular components of their tunic have been documented. Multiple different cellular types have been found to be distributed in the tunic of Pyrosome atlanticum, Pyrosomella verticillata, and Pyrostremma spinosum. These cell types include Tunic amebocytes, which are found to be motile and shaped asymmetrically. They are also found to either contain granules or phagosomes within them. Another cell type is known as Spherical Tunic cells, in which contain spherical vesicle that often contain eosinophilic and acidic substances. Net cells form a net in which the cell's elongated filopodia connect with each other, forming a network. This network maintains a tension in order to reinforce the colony shape and support the cell's cloacal cavity. Multicellular cords also exist between the tunic cells and the zooids, and are known as test fibers. They are hypothesized to maintain and control muscle contractions of the zooids.

== Geographic distribution ==
Pyrosomes are globally distributed organisms, with recorded sightings in every ocean, with the exception of the Arctic Ocean, and are typically latitudinally confined within 50°N and 50°S. However, some pyrosome species have been shown to expand their geographic range in response to increasing ocean temperatures, which has unknown implications for the already existing ecosystems. Additionally, there is some evidence pointing towards geographic distribution changes of pyrosome colonies in relation to changes in the season.

In relation to vertical distribution and diel vertical migration, pyrosomes have been shown to travel between 20 meters to greater than 700 meters in the water column. Although most pyrosome sightings occur relatively near the surface at night, there is still wide intraspecies variation in migration distance, ranging from travel distances of 20 meters to more than 500 meters per day.

== Blooms ==
Pyrosomes have the ability to create enormous blooms, which are rapid and substantial increases in population. Some scientists hypothesize that the presence of a food fall can contribute to these blooms. Since pyrosomes are food-limited organisms, they may take advantage of these circumstances to increase reproduction.

Past evidence suggests that sustained, multi-year blooms are not environmentally favorable, but blooms may become increasingly prevalent as warming water temperatures globally can provide favorable conditions for recurring pyrosome blooms. In 2017, pyrosomes were observed to have spread in unprecedented numbers along the Pacific coast of North America as far north as Alaska. The causes remain unknown, but one hypothesis is that this bloom may have resulted in part from unusually warm water along the coast over several preceding years. Also, weak upwelling off the coast of northern California creates an ideal environment for blooms. Scientists were concerned that should there be a massive die-off of the pyrosomes, it could create a huge dead zone as the decomposition of their bodies could consume much of the oxygen dissolved in the surrounding seawater.

Scientists have observed that large blooms can hurt pelagic food webs, for an increased population leads to increased grazing pressure, ultimately affecting the transfer of energy in these environments. Through this excessive phytoplankton grazing, the amount of food available for other organisms to feed on decreases. However, pyrosomes contain a lot of energy and have been reported being consumed by pelagic fish and cetaceans; there have also been jelly-falls containing pyrosomes, suggesting that these organisms can provide carbon for benthic organisms to consume.

== Bibliography ==
- Bone, Q. editor (1998) The Biology of Pelagic Tunicates. Oxford University Press, Oxford. 340 pp.
