= Zooid =

Single animal that is part of a colonial animal

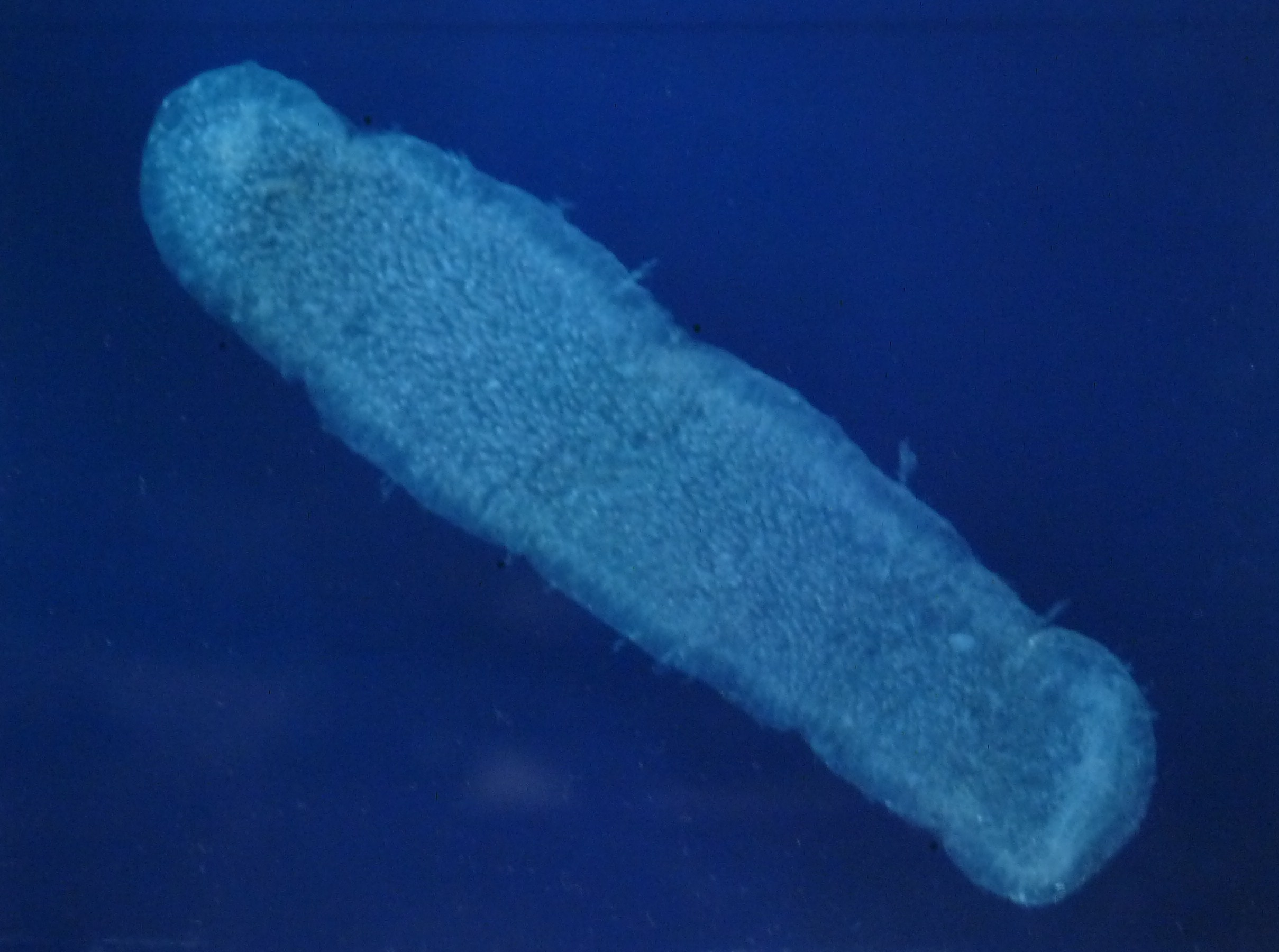
Pyrosoma atlanticum, a tunicate, is a colony of zooids

A zooid or zoöid (/ˈzoʊ.ɔɪd/ ZOH-oyd) is an animal that is part of a colonial animal. This lifestyle has been adopted by animals from separate unrelated taxa. Zooids are multicellular; their structure is similar to that of other solitary animals. The zooids can either be directly connected by tissue (e.g. corals, Catenulida, Siphonophorae, Pyrosome or Ectoprocta) or share a common exoskeleton (e.g. Bryozoa or Pterobranchia). The colonial organism as a whole is alternatively called a zoon /ˈzoʊ.ɒn/, plural zoa (from Ancient Greek zôion ζῷον meaning 'animal'; plural zôia, ζῷα) or compound animal.

Zooids can exhibit polymorphism. For instance, extant bryozoans may have zooids adapted for different functions, such as feeding, anchoring the colony to the substratum and for brooding embryos. However, fossil bryozoans are only known by the colony structures that the zooids formed during life.

There are correlations between the size of some zooids and temperature. Variations in zooid size within colonies of fossils can be used as an indicator of the temperature and the seasonality of seas in the geological past.

The term zooid has historically also been used for an organic cell or organized body that has independent movement within a living organism, especially a motile gamete such as a spermatozoon (in the case of algae now zoid), or an independent animal-like organism produced asexually, as by budding or fission.

== See also ==
- Siphonophorae for colonial Hydrozoa which superficially resemble the other Cnidaria colloquially referred to as "jellyfish"
- Pyrosome for colonial chordates in Tunicata
