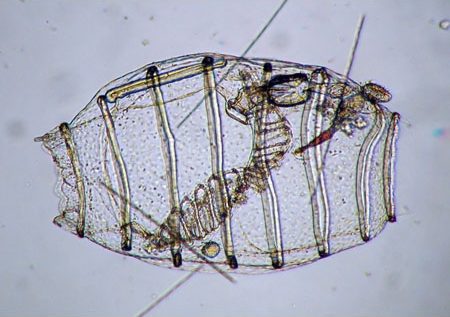
- Unidentified species of Doliolum about 1.4 mm long

Scientific classification
- Domain: Eukaryota
- Kingdom: Animalia
- Phylum: Chordata
- Subphylum: Tunicata
- Class: Thaliacea
- Order: Doliolida; Delage & Hérouard, 1898

Suborders
- Doliolidina; Doliopsidina

= Doliolida =

Order of tunicates

The Doliolida are an order of small marine chordates of the subphylum Tunicata. They are in the class Thaliacea, which also includes the salps and pyrosomes. The doliolid body is small, typically 1–2 mm long, and barrel-shaped; it features two wide siphons, one at the front and the other at the back end, and eight or nine circular muscle strands reminiscent of barrel bands.

Like all tunicates, except for the predatory tunicate, they are filter feeders. Unlike the related class Ascidiacea, which are sessile, but like the class Appendicularia, they are free-swimming plankton; cilia pump water through the body which drives them forward. As the water passes through, small particles and plankton on which the animal feeds are strained from the water by the gill slits. Doliolids can also move by contracting the muscular bands around the body creating a temporary water jet that thrusts them forward or backward quite quickly.

The Doliolida have a complicated life cycle that includes sexual and asexual generations. They are nearly exclusively tropical animals, although a few species do occur as far to the north as northern California.

== Life cycle ==
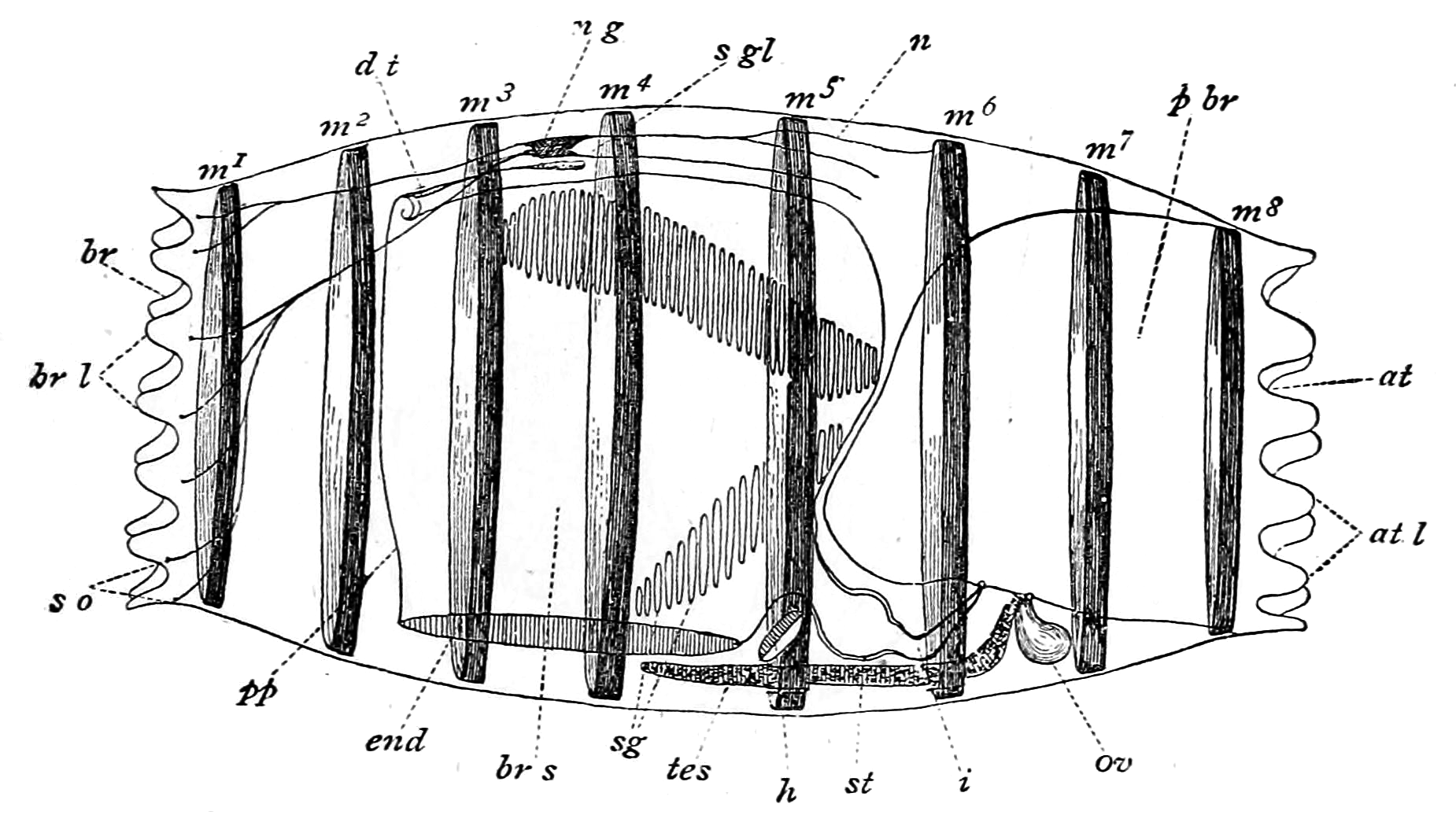
Doliolum denticulatum Sexual generation, from the left side: m1-m8: muscle bands; at) atrial apertures; br) branchial apertures; br s) branchial sac; sg) stigmata; st) stomach; ng) nerve ganglion; so) sense organs

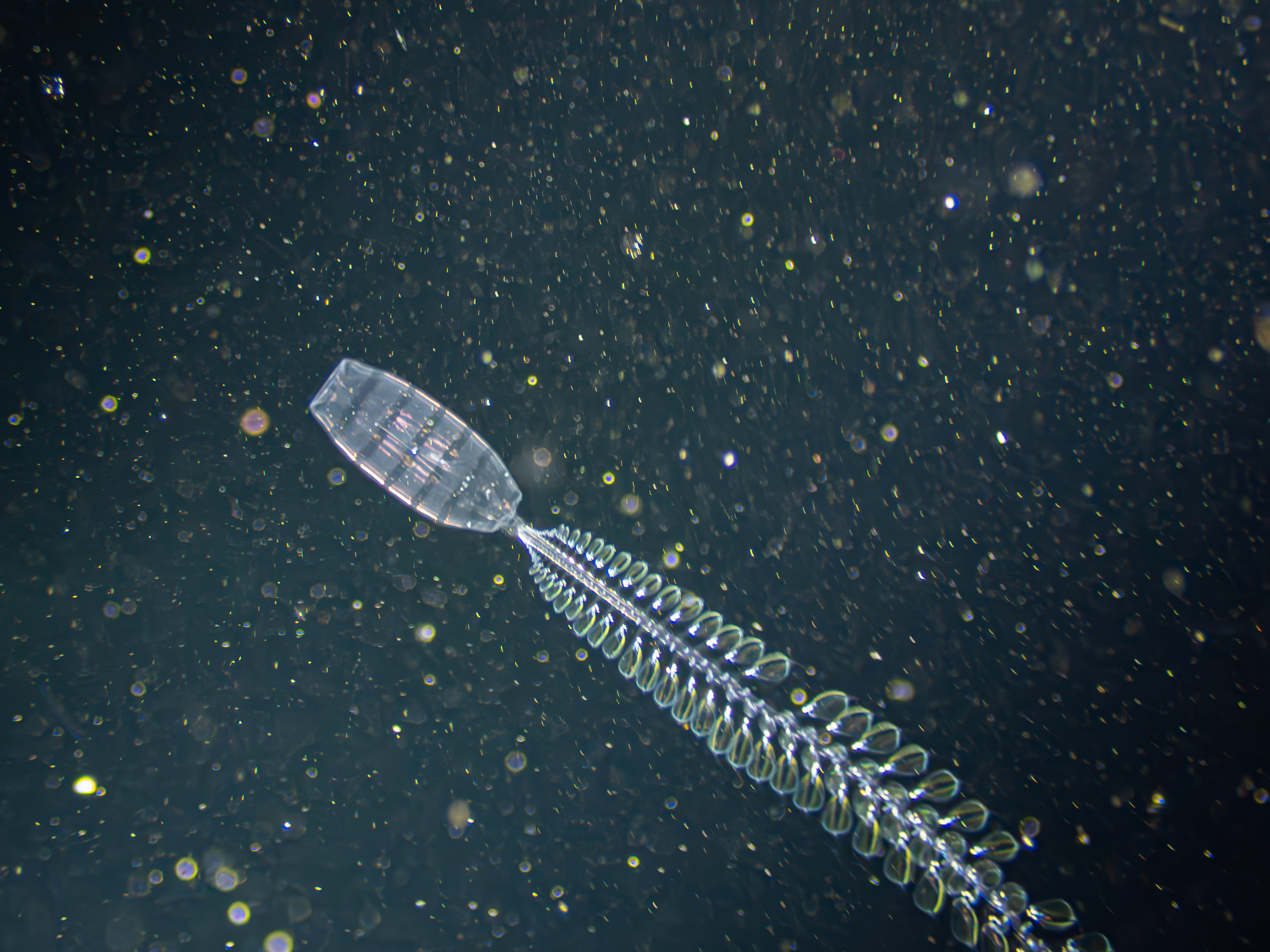
Asexual generation (nurse) carrying developing zooids on its dorsal stalk

Doliolids alternate through sexual and asexual generations. The sexual generation consists of individuals featuring eight muscle bands, each having male or female gonads. These individuals are called gonozooids. Fertilized eggs produce slightly different individuals, featuring nine muscle bands, no gonads, and two stalks growing from each individual's body: the shorter one at the ventral side, and the longer one growing from the dorsal edge of the posterior siphon. These asexual individuals are informally called "nurses", and each one produces an astonishing number of mature progeny asexually; such progeny include both sexual and asexual zooids in three sequential "generations".

The nurse produces buds (which grow into new zooids) in its ventral stalk, but the buds grow and mature on its dorsal stalk. Each bud is an aggregate of a few dozen cells, and the way it gets to its final place is the first peculiarity of doliolid reproduction. Buds are immobile, but are actively carried by special mobile cells, called phorocytes, which literally means "carrier cells", shaped like amoebae. Each bud is transported by several phorocytes, which follow a clearly defined path across the nurse's body: up the ventral stalk, in a spiral along the left side of the "barrel", and finally onto and along the dorsal stalk.

The first buds grow in pairs on either side of the dorsal stalk. They develop into zooids not unlike the nurse, each attached to its dorsal stalk with its own dorsal stalk. These zooids differ from the individual independent adult; their intake siphons are so much wider than the rear that the individual zooid is spoon-shaped rather than barrel-shaped. The spoon-shaped zooids supply food for the whole colony via a common blood circulation along two blood-filled sinuses that extend from the nurse along the whole length of the dorsal stalk. As this first generation grows, the nurse's feeding role is gradually diminished, and at the point where the colony's nutrition is supplied by the stalk zooids the nurse loses most of its organs, becoming a purely generative and propulsive agent, dragging its huge grape-like stalk behind it.

As the dorsal stalk grows and more zooids grow along its sides, the phorocytes begin to grow a second batch of buds in two more rows between the first two, on the dorsal side of the stalk. These grow into asexual zooids that are smaller, are barrel-shaped like the nurse, and are attached to the nurse's stalk with their ventral stalks. They do not have a dorsal stalk themselves. Because of their later function, members of this generation are called phorozooids, which means "carrier zooids".

Finally, when the two phorozooid rows on the nurse's stalk are filled up and the first phorozooids grow big enough, the phorocytes begin to plant subsequent buds on the stalks of phorozooids, which are still attached to the main colony at this point. Only this third batch of buds eventually grows into gonozooids - the sexual generation.

As phorozooids mature, their stalks detach from the nurse's stalk, and they swim away on their own, carrying budding gonozooids on their own stalks. The nurse and its battery of feeding zooids goes on until all carriers leave, and then the whole colony dies off. The carriers go on as long as it is required for the gonozooids on their stalks to grow and detach, and then they die off too.

Gonozooids detached from the phorozooid swim free, mate, and produce fertilized eggs - from which spring the next generation of asexual zooid "factories", and the cycle repeats. The total number of zooids produced by a single nurse colony can reach tens of thousands - explosive growth unusual in the animal kingdom.

== Natural enemies ==
The gelatinous doliolid Dolioletta gegenbauri is preyed upon by the copepod Sapphirina nigromaculata that chews through and enters its body cavity and then ingests its internal tissues.

== See also ==
- Gelatinous zooplankton
