= List of English words of Australian Aboriginal origin =

This is a list of English words derived from Australian Aboriginal languages. Some are restricted to Australian English as a whole or to certain regions of the country. Others, such as kangaroo and boomerang, have become widely used in other varieties of English, and some have been borrowed into other languages beyond English.

== Flora and fauna ==
- ballart
- barramundi
- bilby
- bindii
- bogong
- boobook
- brigalow
- brolga
- budgerigar
- bunyip
- burdardu
- coolabah
- cumbungi
- cunjevoi
- curara

currawong (definition)
Probably from Yagara garrawaŋ, ultimately onomatopoeic.

- dillon bush

dingo (definition)
From Dharug dingu, "tame/domesticated dog".
galah (definition)
From Gamilaraay gilaa, "galah".
gang-gang (definition)
Possibly from Wiradjuri gaŋ-gaŋ, likely an onomatopoeic name.

- geebung
- gidgee
- gilgie
- gymea
- jarrah
- kangaroo
- koala
- kookaburra
- kurrajong
- kutjera
- mallee
- marri
- mihirung
- mulga
- Myall

numbat (definition)
From Noongar nhumbad, "numbat".
pademelon (definition)
From Dharug badimaliyan, "pademelon".
potoroo (definition)
From Dharug buduru, "potoroo".
quandong (definition)
From Wiradjuri guwandhang, "quandong".
quokka (definition)
From Noongar kwaka, "quokka".
quoll (definition)
From the earlier form je-quoll, ultimately from Guugu Yimidhirr dhigul, "native cat".
taipan (definition)
From Wik-Mungkan thaypan, "Rainbow Serpent, taipan".
wallaby (definition)
From Dharug wollabi, "wallaby, rock-wallaby".
wallaroo (definition)
From Dharug wularu, "wallaroo".
waratah (definition)
From Dharug warada, "waratah".
warrigal (definition)
From Dharug wuragal, "wild/undomesticated dog".
witchetty (definition)
Possibly from Arabana witjuti, "witchetty bush".
wobbegong (definition)
From Dharug wabigang, "wobbegong" (cf. Dharawal dhabigang).
wombat (definition)
From Dharug wumbat, "wombat".
wonga-wonga (definition)
From Dharug wungawunga, "wonga pigeon".
yabby (definition)
From Wemba Wemba yabij, "yabby".

== Environment ==
billabong (definition)
From Wiradjuri bilabang, likely a compound of bila, "river", and bong or bung, "dead".

- bombora (rapids–often used to describe offshore reef breaks)
- boondie (hardened clump of sand; Noongar, W.A.)
- gilgai
- lerp (crystallized honeydew produced by larvae of psyllid bugs, gathered as food)
- min-min lights (ground-level lights of uncertain origin sometimes seen in remote rural Australia)
- willy willy (dust devil)

== Aboriginal culture ==
- alcheringa
- bingy (pron. binji) belly
- boomerang
- bunyip
- cooee (a call used to attract attention)
- coolamon (wooden curved bowl used to carry food or baby)
- corroboree
- dilli (a bag) commonly, and tautologically, as "dilly-bag"
- djanga
- gibber (a stone)
- gin (now a racially offensive word for an Aboriginal woman)
- gunyah
- humpy (a hut)
- kurdaitcha
- lubra (now a racially offensive word for an Aboriginal woman)
- marn grook
- mia-mia (a hut)
- nulla-nulla
- turndun
- waddy (a wooden club), earlier, any piece of wood
- woggabaliri
- woomera
- wurlie or wurley, a hut
- yabber or yabber-yabber (talk)
- yakka (doing work of any kind)
- Yara-ma-yha-who

== Describing words ==
- Koori - Aboriginal people from Victoria and New South Wales
- cooee
- Nunga - Aboriginal people from South Australia
- Murri - Aboriginal people from Queensland
- Noongar - Aboriginal people from southern Western Australia
- Palawa - Aboriginal people from Tasmania
- yarndi (slang term for marijuana)

== Names ==
- Kylie (Noongar word for "throwing stick")

== English words often falsely assumed to be of Australian Aboriginal origin ==
- bandicoot (from the Telugu, pandikokku a term originally referring to the unrelated bandicoot rat)
- cockabully (from Māori kokopu)
- cockatoo (from Malay)
- didgeridoo (likely as an onomatopoeia derived from the sound of the instrument)
- emu (from Arabic, via Portuguese, for large bird)
- goanna (corruption of the Taíno iguana)
- jabiru (from Tupi–Guarani via Spanish, originally referred to an American bird)
- nullarbor (Latin for no tree)'

== Bibliography ==
- Troy, Jakelin (1994). The Sydney Language (PDF). Canberra. p. 47. ISBN 0646110152.
