= Cunjevoi =

In Australia, a cunjevoi may mean:

- Alocasia brisbanensis also known as "native lily" or "spoon lily"
- Alocasia macrorrhizos or "giant taro" or "elephant ear taro"
- Any of the Australian members of the "Pyura stolonifera species complex", tunicate or sea squirt marine animals, including:
  - Pyura praeputialis, the cunjevoi proper
  - Pyura dalbyi, the yellow cunjevoi
  - Pyura doppelgangera, the doppelganger cunjevoi
