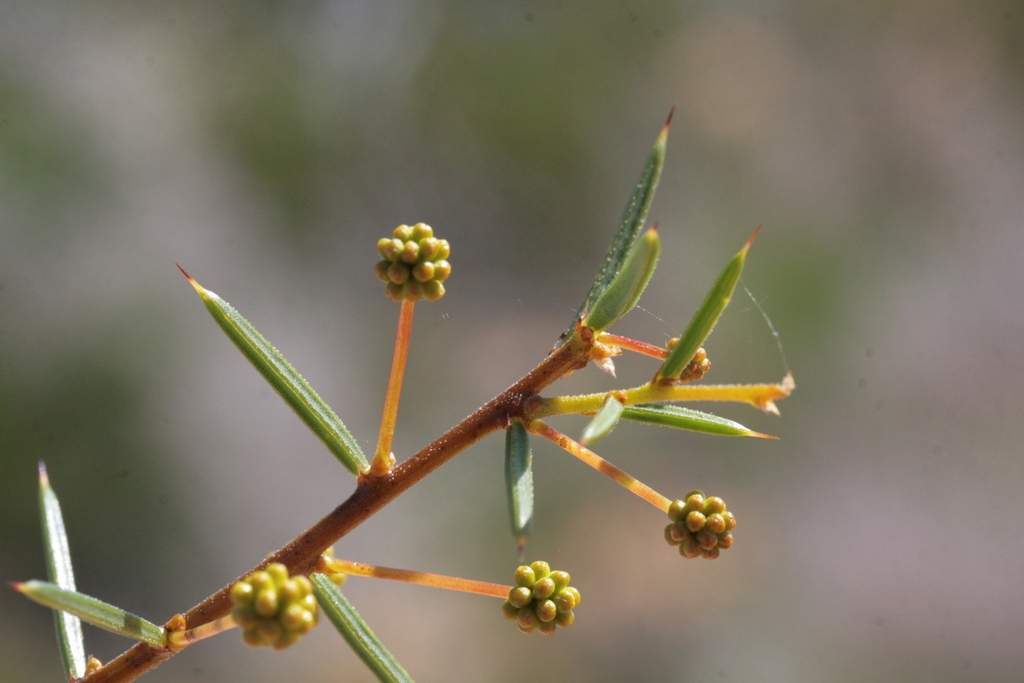
- Near Eurardy

Scientific classification
- Kingdom: Plantae
- Clade: Embryophytes
- Clade: Tracheophytes
- Clade: Spermatophytes
- Clade: Angiosperms
- Clade: Eudicots
- Clade: Rosids
- Order: Fabales
- Family: Fabaceae
- Subfamily: Caesalpinioideae
- Clade: Mimosoid clade
- Genus: Acacia
- Species: A. quadrisulcata

Binomial name
- Acacia quadrisulcata F.Muell.
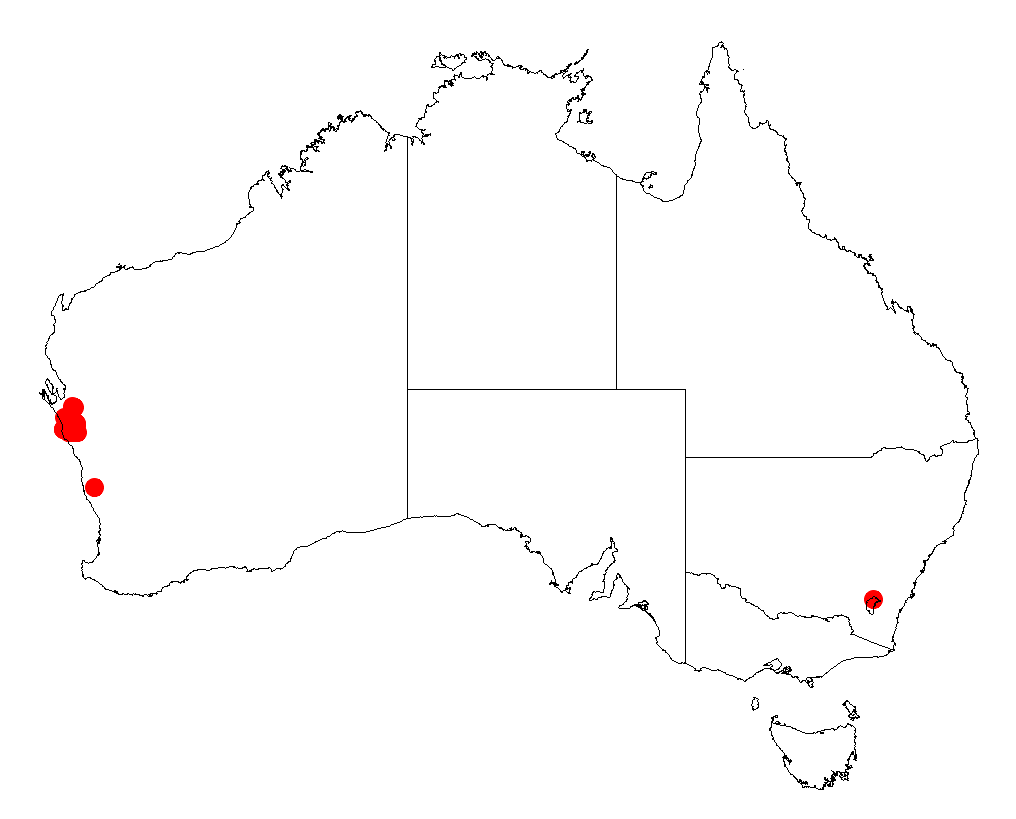
- Occurrence data from AVH

= Acacia quadrisulcata =

Species of legume

Acacia quadrisulcata is a shrub of the genus Acacia and the subgenus Phyllodineae endemic to Western Australia.

== Description ==
The spreading pungent shrub typically grows to a height of 0.4 to 1 metre (1.3 to 3.3 ft). The branchlets are covered in small curved hairs and have scarious triangular stipules that are around 1 millimetre (0.039 in) in length. The evergreen rigid and pungent phyllodes are quadrangular in section with a length of 7 to 20 mm (0.276 to 0.787 in) and a width of around 1 mm (0.039 in).

It blooms from September to December and produces yellow flowers. The simple inflorescences are arranged with one per axil with spherical flower-heads containing 15 to 20 light golden flowers that turn orange-brown when dry. After flowering linear yellow woodyseed pods form that are around 5 centimetres (2.0 in) in length and around 4 mm (0.157 in) wide. The mottled seeds within the pods have an ovate to oblong shape and are about 3 mm (0.118 in) in length.

The phyllodes resemble those of Acacia tetragonophylla and the acicular phyllode variant of Acacia maitlandii.

== Taxonomy ==
The species was first formally described by the botanist Ferdinand von Mueller in 1863 as part of the work Fragmenta Phytographiae Australiae. It was reclassified as Racosperma quadrisulcatum by Leslie Pedley in 2003 then transferred back to the genus Acacia in 2006.

== Distribution ==
It is native to an area between Northampton and Shark Bay in the Mid West region of Western Australia where it is found on sand plains and sandhills growing in sandy clay soils over limestone or laterite. The shrub is usually part of a heath or shrubland communities.

== See also ==
- List of Acacia species
