= Mazeppa National Park =

National park in Australia

- IUCN category II (national park)
- Location within Queensland
- Location: Queensland
- Nearest city: Clermont
- Coordinates: 22°13′54″S 147°17′28″E
- Area: 41.30 km^{2} (15.95 sq mi)
- Established: 1972
- Governing body: Queensland Parks and Wildlife Service
- Website: Official website

Mazeppa is a national park in Central Queensland, Australia, 821 km northwest of Brisbane, and 75 km north-west of Clermont. Named after Hetman Ivan Mazepa, the hero of the poem Mazeppa by Lord Byron. The predominant vegetation is gidgee scrub with some brigalow scrub and open eucalypt woodland.

Bush camping is possible within the park once a permit is obtained and fee paid. There are no walking tracks.

== See also ==
- Protected areas of Queensland
