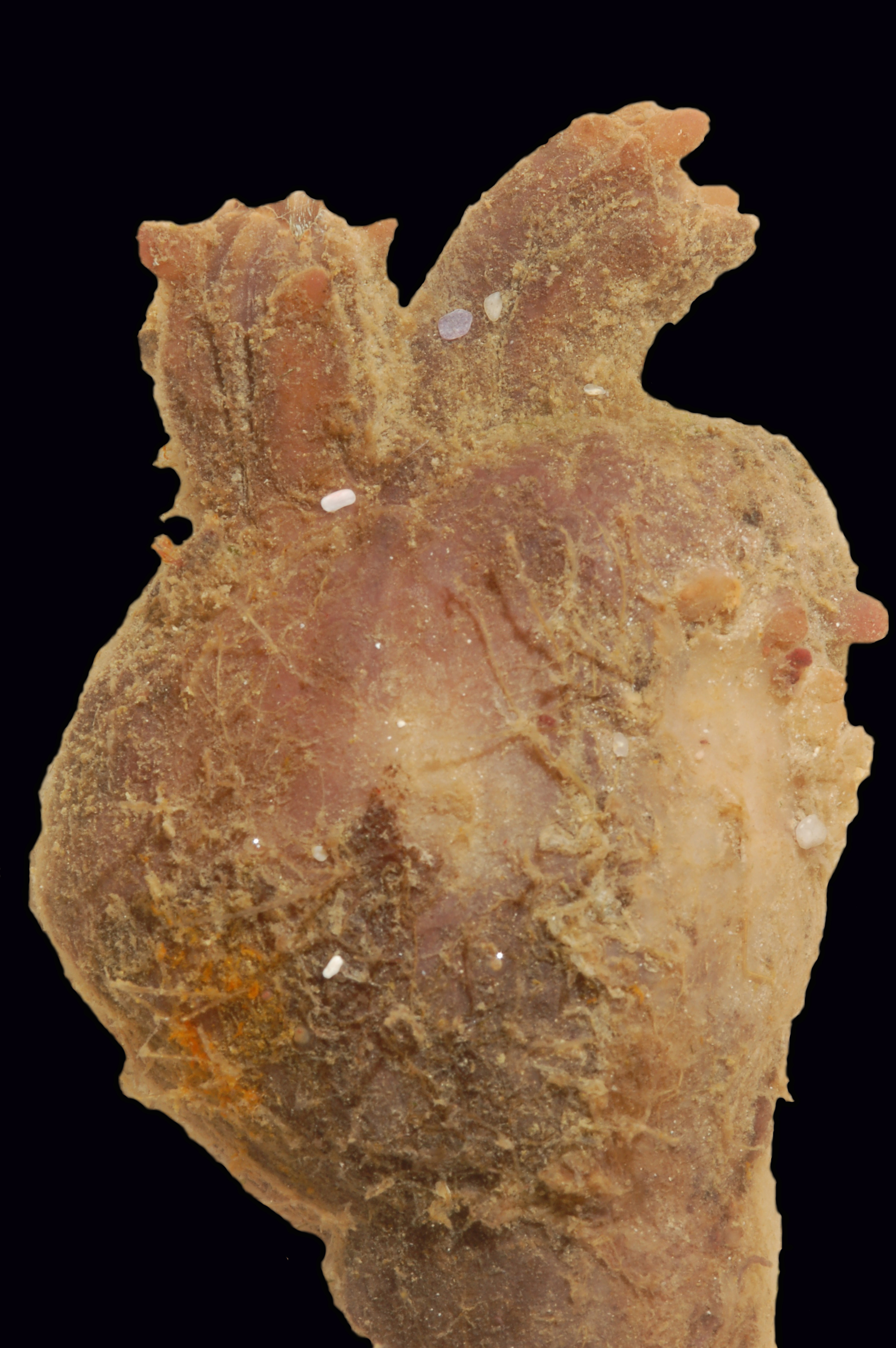

Scientific classification
- Domain: Eukaryota
- Kingdom: Animalia
- Phylum: Chordata
- Subphylum: Tunicata
- Class: Ascidiacea
- Order: Stolidobranchia
- Family: Pyuridae
- Genus: Pyura
- Species: P. herdmani

Binomial name
- Pyura herdmani (Drasche, 1884)

= Pyura herdmani =

Herdman's red bait

Species of sea squirt

Pyura herdmani, one of two southern African species of "red bait" (or "rooiaas" in Afrikaans), is a sessile ascidian, or sea squirt, that lives in coastal waters attached to rocks or artificial structures. Sea squirts are named for their habit of squirting a stream of water from their exhalant siphons when touched at low tide.

== Description ==
Pyura herdmani is readily identifiable by the pointed papillae on its tunic. However, the tunic can be highly variable in terms of its morphology, which seems to depend largely on habitat type (which includes intertidal and subtidal areas, rocky and sandy substrata, sheltered and exposed sites). When growing on sandy bottoms, P. herdmani can grow a large peduncle to anchor itself into the sand.

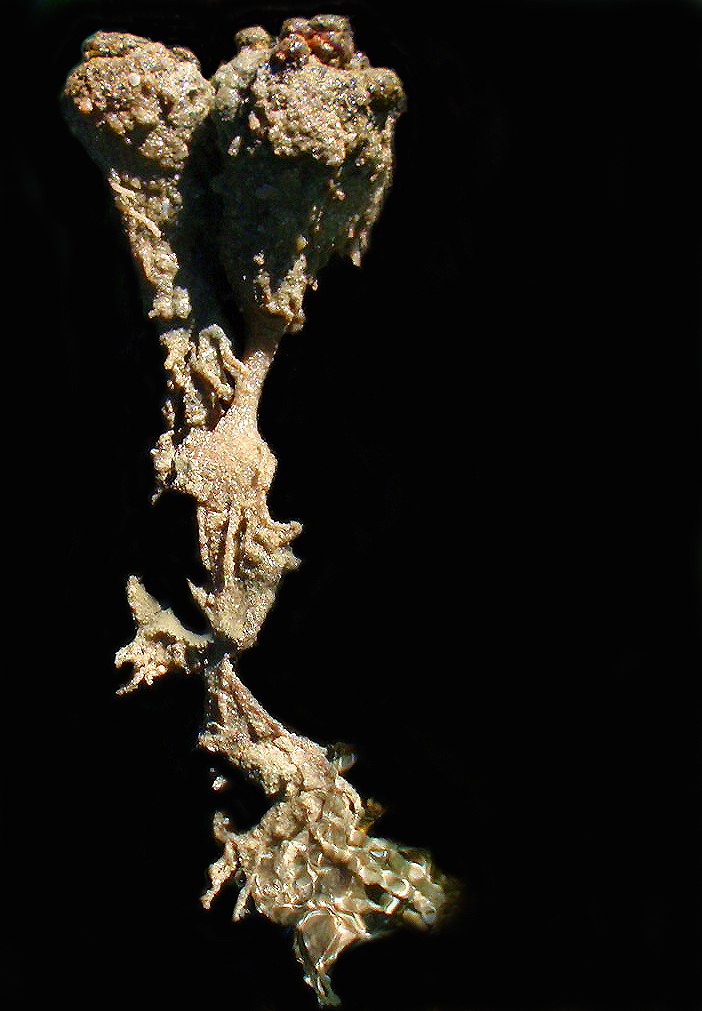
Large pedunculated aggregate characteristic of Pyura herdmani living on sandy bottoms; Langebaan Lagoon (Photo: Marc Rius)

== Geographical range ==
This species is found in coastal areas of the temperate, subtropical and tropical marine bioregions of southern Africa. In the temperate provinces, its range overlaps with that of the morphologically similar P. stolonifera, a species that often occurs in sympatry and that can even hybridise with P. herdmani (M. Rius, unpubl. data). Its confirmed northeastern distribution limit is Ponta do Ouro in southern Mozambique, but it is possible that it occurs beyond this site. Pyura herdmani also occurs in north-western Africa, with populations reported from Morocco and Senegal.

== Taxonomy ==
The taxonomy of this species is complicated, and genetic data indicate that it comprises at least three mitochondrial DNA lineages, each of which may represent a distinct species: a temperate southern African form, a subtropical/tropical southern African form, and a north-western African form.
