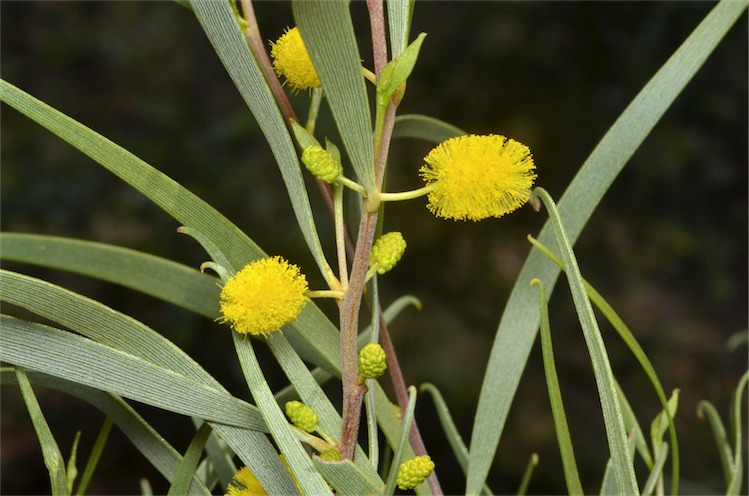
- In the Australian National Botanic Gardens

Scientific classification
- Kingdom: Plantae
- Clade: Embryophytes
- Clade: Tracheophytes
- Clade: Spermatophytes
- Clade: Angiosperms
- Clade: Eudicots
- Clade: Rosids
- Order: Fabales
- Family: Fabaceae
- Subfamily: Caesalpinioideae
- Clade: Mimosoid clade
- Genus: Acacia
- Species: A. subtessarogona

Binomial name
- Acacia subtessarogona Tindale & Maslin
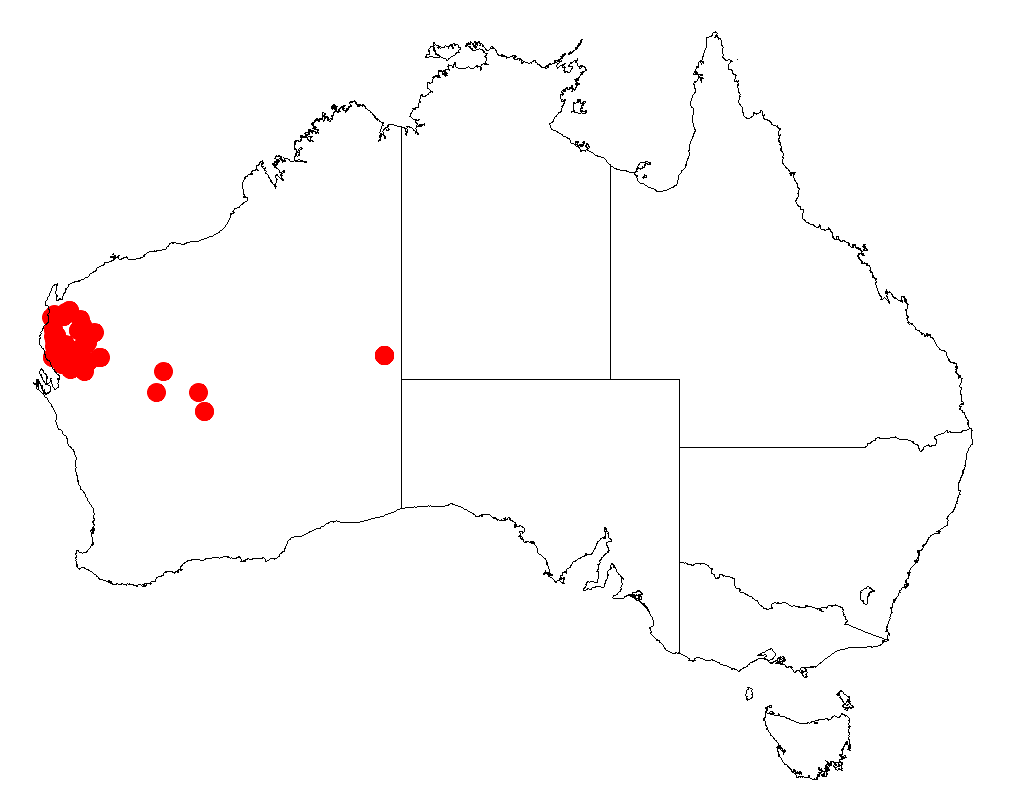
- Occurrence data from AVH

= Acacia subtessarogona =

Spreading gidgee

Species of legume

Acacia subtessarogona, commonly known as spreading gidgee, is a tree in the family Fabaceae and the subgenus Juliflorae that is native to a small area in western Australia.

== Description ==
Spreading gidgee grows as an upright tree to a height of up to 8 m (26 ft) and has ribbed branchlets that are densely hired between each of the ribs. Like most Acacia species, it has phyllodes rather than true leaves. These are flat, curved, and have a length of about 7 to 13 cm (2.8 to 5.1 in) and a width of 4 to 9 mm (0.16 to 0.35 in) and have longitudinal striations. When it between July and October it produces simple inflorescences that occur in groups of one to five in the axils on 4 to 8 mm (0.16 to 0.31 in) long stalks. The flower-heads are a short cylindrical shape with a length of 6 to 12 mm (0.24 to 0.47 in) and densely packed with yellow flowers. The seed pods that form after flowering have a length of 6 to 12 cm (2.4 to 4.7 in) with a distinctive groove along each edge. The seeds insode are 5 to 6.5 mm (0.20 to 0.26 in) long and have an obloid shape.

== Distribution ==
Endemic to Western Australia, it occurs only in a small area of the Gascoyne River catchment near Carnarvon with outlying population near Wiluna. It is often found situated in low-lying area, along creeklines or on rocky ground growing in red loamy soils and is commonly associated with Acacia sclerosperma and Acacia tetragonophylla and sometimes with Acacia ancistrocarpa.

== See also ==
- List of Acacia species
