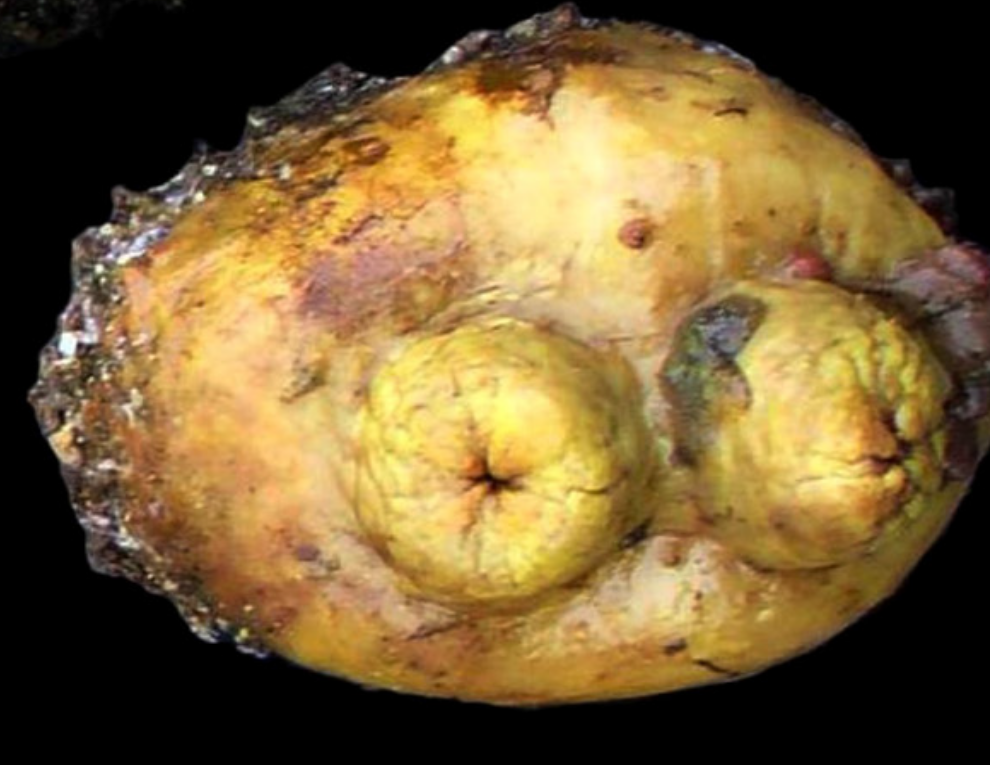

Scientific classification
- Kingdom: Animalia
- Phylum: Chordata
- Subphylum: Tunicata
- Class: Ascidiacea
- Order: Stolidobranchia
- Family: Pyuridae
- Genus: Pyura
- Species: P. dalbyi

Binomial name
- Pyura dalbyi Rius & Teske, 2011

= Pyura dalbyi =

Species of sea squirt

Pyura dalbyi, the yellow cunjevoi, is a species of tunicate

== Distribution ==
This species has been found in several localities in Victoria, south-eastern Australia, and in a single locality in Western Australia (Albany harbour). Unlike other species of cunjevoi in temperate Australasia, P. dalbyi has been found almost exclusively subtidally.

== Description ==
Pyura dalbyi has a yellow, sand-free tunic, a highly conspicuous feature that readily distinguishes it from other species of cunjevoi in temperate Australasia.

== Etymology ==
Pyura dalbyi is named after Dr. James Edward Dalby Jr, who reported distributional, morphometric and ecological differences between this species and its congener P. praeputialis.

== Taxonomy ==
This species is a member of the "P. stolonifera species complex", a group of large ascidians that are often indiscriminately referred to as P. stolonifera in the literature. Genetic data indicate that it is only distantly related to the other two Australasian species in this species complex, P. praeputialis and P. doppelgangera.
