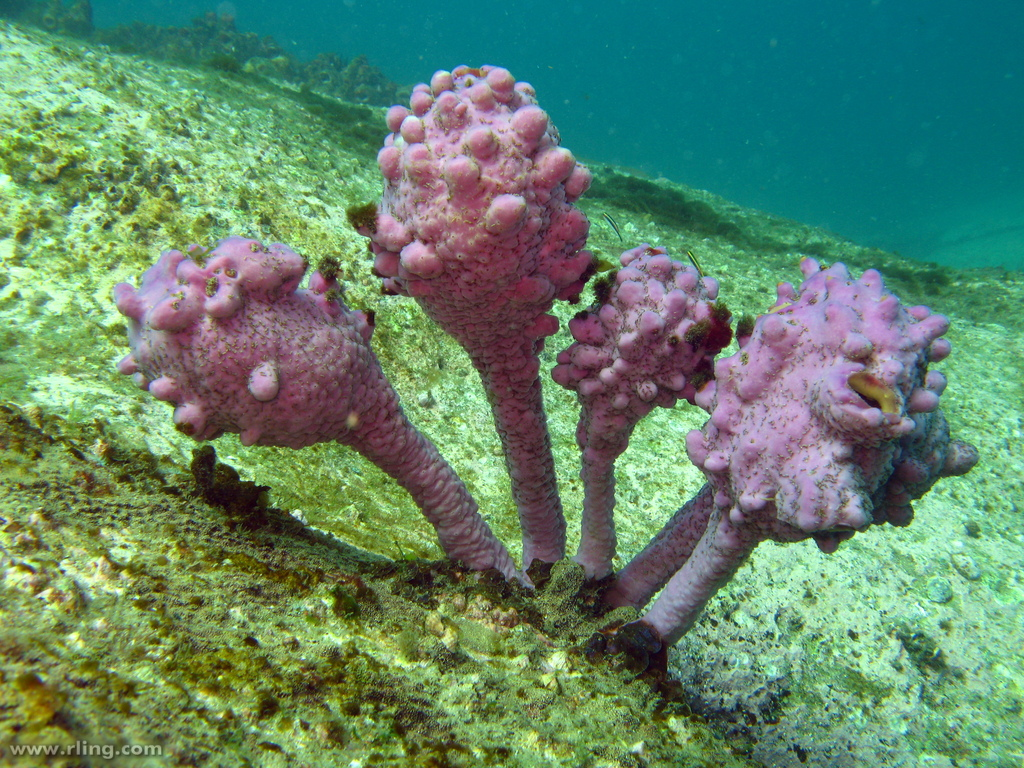
- The sea tulip Pyura spinifera

Scientific classification
- Domain: Eukaryota
- Kingdom: Animalia
- Phylum: Chordata
- Subphylum: Tunicata
- Class: Ascidiacea
- Order: Stolidobranchia
- Family: Pyuridae
- Genus: Pyura; Molina, 1782

Species
- See text

= Pyura =

Genus of sea squirts

Pyura is a large genus of sessile ascidians that live in coastal waters at depths of up to 80 m (260 feet). Like all ascidians, Pyura are filter feeders. A few species, including Pyura chilensis are commercially fished.

== Species ==
Species in this genus include

- Pyura abradata (Kott, 1985)
- Pyura ambonensis (Millar, 1975)
- Pyura antillarum (Van Name, 1921)
- Pyura arenosa (Herdman, 1882)
- Pyura aripuensis (Herdman, 1906)
- Pyura australis (Quoy & Gaimard, 1834)
- Pyura baliensis (Millar, 1975)
- Pyura bouvetensis (Michaelsen, 1904)
- Pyura breviramosa (Sluiter, 1904)
- Pyura cadamostoi (Monniot, 1994)
- Pyura camranica (Vorontsova & Cole, 1995)
- Pyura cancellata (Brewin, 1946)
- Pyura capensis (Hartmeyer)
- Pyura carnea (Brewin, 1948)
- Pyura chilensis (Molina, 1782)
- Pyura columna (Monniot & Monniot, 1991)
- Pyura comma (Hartmeyer, 1906)
- Pyura confragosa (Kott, 1985)
- Pyura crassacapitata (Kott, 1985)
- Pyura crinita (Michaelsen, 1922)
- Pyura curvigona (Tokioka, 1950)
- Pyura dalbyi (Rius & Teske, 2011) 'yellow cunjevoi'
- Pyura discoveryi (Herdman, 1910)
- Pyura discrepans (Sluiter, 1898)
- Pyura doppelgangera (Rius & Teske, 2013) 'doppelganger cunjevoi'
- Pyura duplicata (Van Name, 1918)
- Pyura dura (Heller, 1877)
- Pyura elongata (Tokioka, 1952)
- Pyura erythrostoma (Quoy and Gaimard, 1834)
- Pyura fissa (Herdman, 1881)
- Pyura gangelion (Savigny, 1816)
- Pyura georgiana (Michaelsen, 1898)
- Pyura gibbosa (Heller, 1878)
- Pyura haustor (Stimpson, 1864)
- Pyura hebridensis (Monniot & Monniot, 2003)
- Pyura herdmani (Drasche, 1884) 'Herdman's red bait'
- Pyura honu (Monniot & Monniot, 1987)
- Pyura hupferi (Michaelsen, 1908)
- Pyura inopinata (Monniot, 1978)
- Pyura irregularis (Herdman, 1881)
- Pyura isobella (Kott, 1985)
- Pyura lanka (Herdman, 1906)
- Pyura legumen (Lesson, 1830)
- Pyura lepidoderma (Tokioka, 1949)
- Pyura lignosa (Michaelsen, 1908)
- Pyura littoralis (Kott, 1956)
- Pyura lutea (Sluiter, 1900)
- Pyura lycoperdon (Monniot & Monniot, 1983)
- Pyura mariscata (Rodrigues, 1966)
- Pyura microcosmus (Savigny, 1816)
- Pyura mirabilis (Drasche, 1884)
- Pyura molguloides (Herdman, 1899)
- Pyura mozambica (Monniot, 2002)
- Pyura multiruga (Monniot & Monniot, 1982)
- Pyura munita (Van Name, 1902)
- Pyura navicula (Kott, 1985)
- Pyura obesa (Hartmeyer, 1919)
- Pyura ostreophila (Hartmeyer & Michaelsen, 1928)
- Pyura pachydermatina (Herdman, 1881) 'sea tulip'
- Pyura paessleri (Michaelsen, 1900)
- Pyura pantex (Savigny, 1816)
- Pyura pennata (Monniot & Monniot, 1991)
- Pyura picta (Brewin, 1950)
- Pyura pilosa Monniot & Monniot, 1974)
- Pyura polycarpa (Sluiter, 1904)
- Pyura praeputialis (Heller, 1878) 'cunjevoi'
- Pyura praia (Monniot & Monniot, 1967)
- Pyura pulla (Sluiter, 1900)
- Pyura rapaformis (Kott, 1990)
- Pyura robusta (Hartmeyer, 1922)
- Pyura rugata (Brewin, 1948)
- Pyura sacciformis (Drasche, 1884)
- Pyura sansibarica (Michaelsen, 1908)
- Pyura scortea (Kott, 1985)
- Pyura setosa (Sluiter, 1905)
- Pyura shiinoi (Tokioka, 1949)
- Pyura spinifera (Quoy & Gaimard, 1834) 'sea tulip'
- Pyura spinosa (Quoy & Gaimard, 1834)
- Pyura spinosissima (Michaelsen, 1922)
- Pyura squamata (Hartmeyer, 1911)
- Pyura squamulosa (Alder, 1863)
- Pyura stolonifera (Heller, 1878) 'red bait'
- Pyura stubenrauchi (Michaelsen, 1900)
- Pyura styeliformis (Monniot & Monniot, 2001)
- Pyura subuculata (Sluiter, 1900)
- Pyura suteri (Michaelsen, 1908)
- Pyura tasmanensis (Kott, 1985)
- Pyura tessellata (Forbes, 1848)
- Pyura torpida (Sluiter, 1898)
- Pyura trigamica (Tokioka, 1953)
- Pyura trita (Sluiter, 1900)
- Pyura tunica (Kott, 1969)
- Pyura turqueti (Sluiter, 1905)
- Pyura typica (author unknown)
- Pyura uatio (Monniot, 1991)
- Pyura vannamei (Monniot, 1994)
- Pyura viarecta (Kott, 1985)
- Pyura vittata (Stimpson, 1852)
