= Gidgee =

Gidgee may refer to any of a number of species of Acacia native to arid or semi-arid regions of Australia, or to the vegetation communities in which these species dominate:

- Most commonly Acacia cambagei
- Acacia argyrodendron, commonly known as "Black Gidgee"
- Acacia anastema, commonly known as "Sanddune dometrius" or just "Gidgee"
- Acacia crombiei, commonly known as pink gidgee.
- Acacia pruinocarpa, commonly known as "Gidgee" or "Black Gidgee"
- Acacia subtessarogona, commonly known as "Spreading Gidgee"
- Acacia georginae, commonly known as "Georgina Gidgee"

== Other uses ==
- Gidgee Gold Mine, a gold mine in Western Australia
