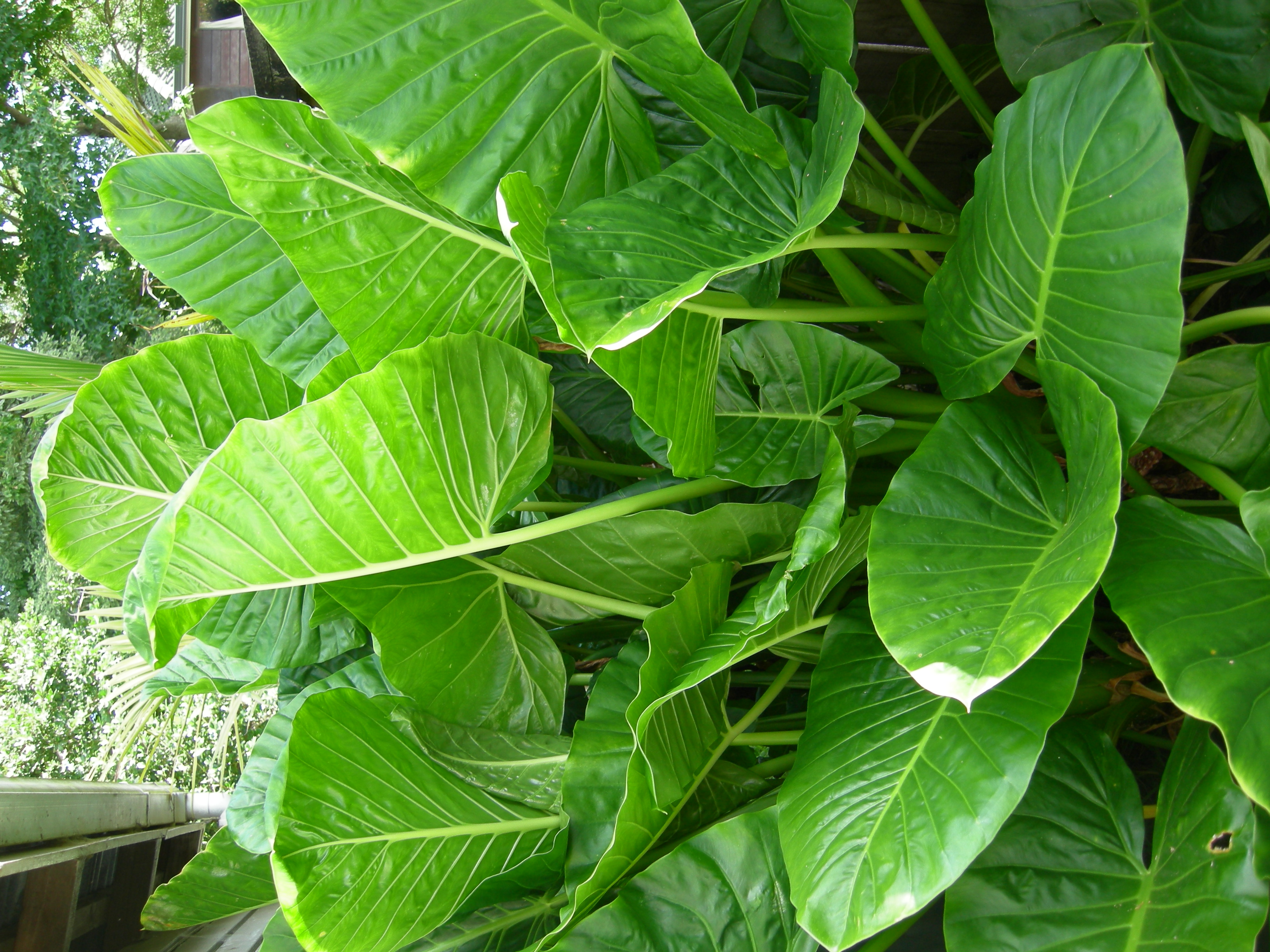

Conservation status
- Least Concern (NCA)

Scientific classification
- Kingdom: Plantae
- Clade: Embryophytes
- Clade: Tracheophytes
- Clade: Angiosperms
- Clade: Monocots
- Order: Alismatales
- Family: Araceae
- Genus: Alocasia
- Species: A. brisbanensis

Binomial name
- Alocasia brisbanensis (F.M. Bailey) Domin

Synonyms
- Alocasia macrorrhizos var. brisbanensis F.M.Bailey

= Alocasia brisbanensis =

Spoon lily

Species of plant

Alocasia brisbanensis, commonly known as cunjevoi, (Note: The term "cunjevoi" also refers to a marine animal) elephant ear, native lily or spoon lily, is a species of plant in the family Araceae native to rainforests of eastern Australia. The common name "cunjevoi" derives from the Bundjalung language of northern New South Wales. It has been cultivated for its large tropical leaves and the heavily scented flowers.

== Description ==
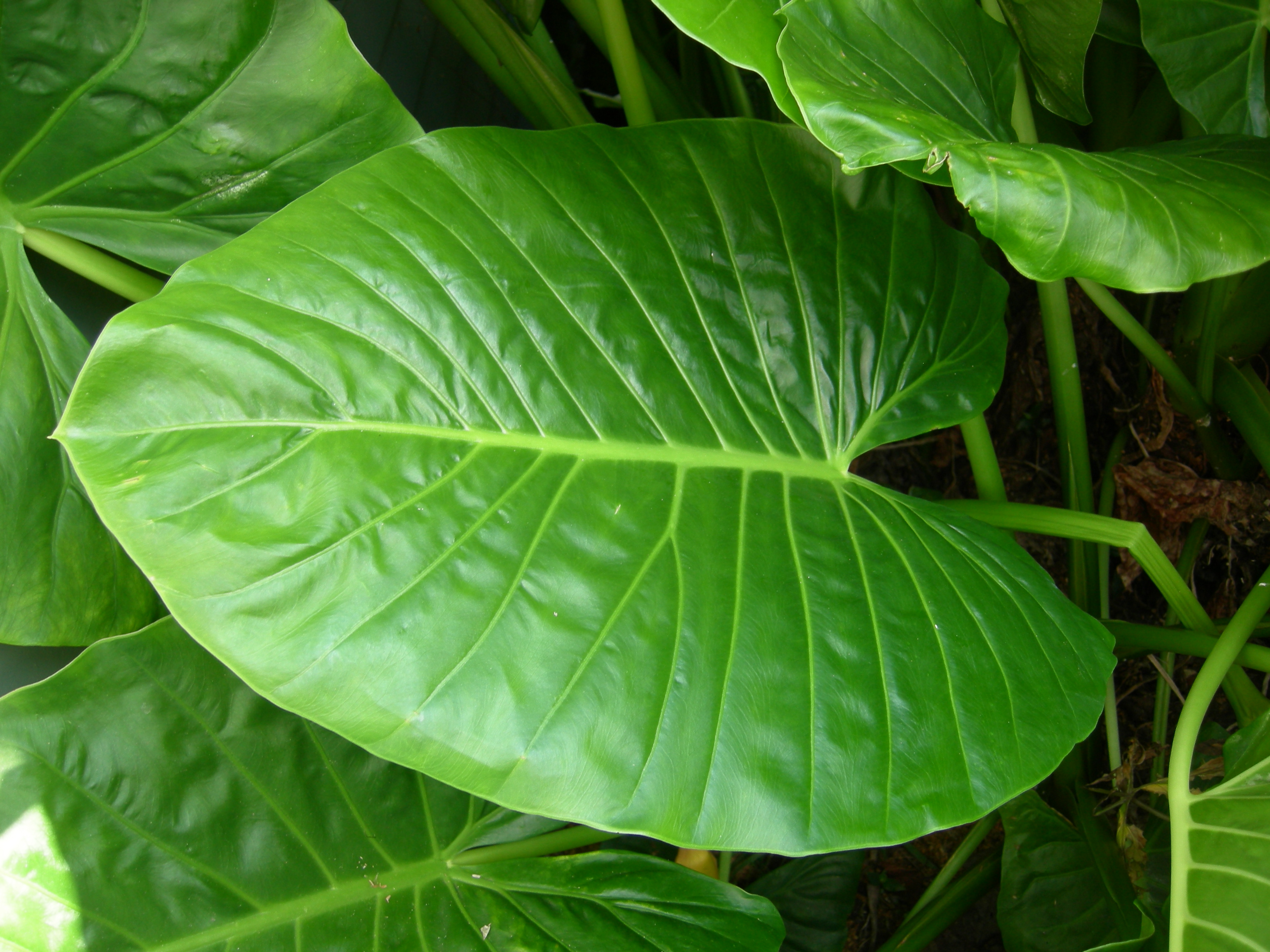
Leaf detail

Alocasia brisbanensis has very large, spade-shaped, veined leaves on long, fleshy, purplish brown to green, petioles that are 1.1 m (3 ft 7 in) long. The plant grows to a height of 1.5 m (4 ft 11 in) to 1.8 m (5 ft 11 in). Leaves are sagittate to ovate-sagittate, around 70 cm (28 in) long and 60 cm (24 in) wide. They are glossy green in colour, glabrous. Backside lobes have acute to rectangular, marginally rounded tips.

Stretched 'oil dots' are visible along the veinlets of the leaves. New shoots grow concurrently with the inflorescence, without a rest period. Stem is prostrate to erect, 13 cm (5.1 in) in diameter, arrayed in the brown remains of spent leaf bases.

=== Inflorescence ===
The peduncle is just about as long as the petioles. The spathe is around 25 cm (9.8 in) long, confined around a third of the length from the base, and is pointed at the tip and open by one side. The limb is ovate to lanceolate, spoon-like (seldom crooked), generally green, which wilts away. The spadix is somewhat shorter than the spathe, dwindling, and is extremely fragrant. Male flowers are typically straight with up to 40 consolidated anthers. There is a distinct flowering peak in December and January, though there are flowering and fruiting collections from all months, except the winter.

The pollen is white or translucent, and the stigma is three-lobed. The perfumed, summer flowers are greenish-cream in colour, and similar to an arum lily. The ovoid, 8–15 mm long red fruits, with a pink or red pericarp, follow the flowering. Fruits split open lengthwise when mature. Seeds are one or two per fruit, about 6–7 mm long. The embryo is about 5 mm long. Ovary is pale green, and female zone contains 120 pistils.

Fruit is eaten by Lewin's honeyeaters, regent bowerbirds, brush-turkeys, eastern water dragons and Victoria's riflebirds.

== Distribution ==
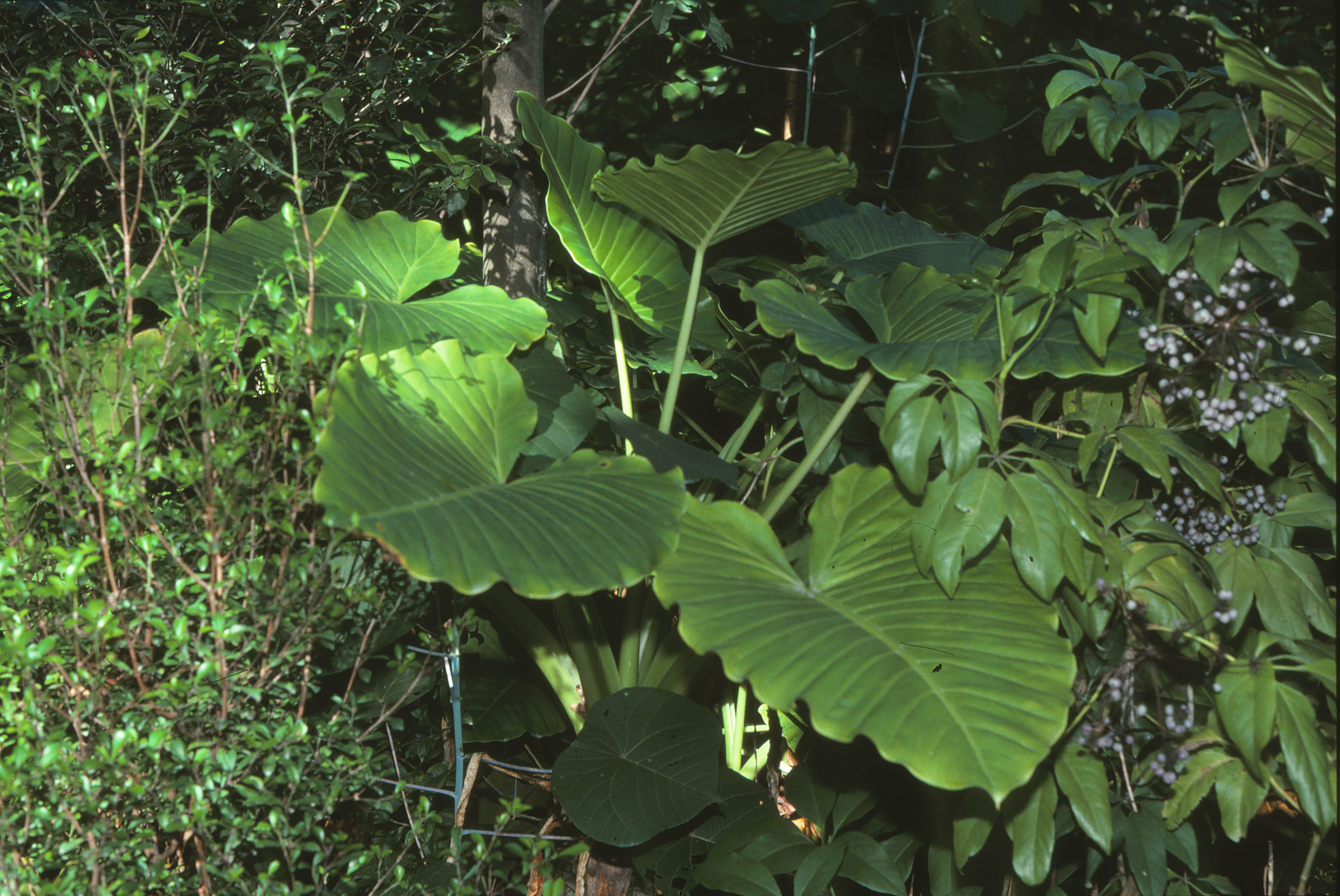
At D'Aguilar National Park in Queensland

It is found on tropical, subtropical, and warm temperate rainforest margins at low altitudes, and as an understorey herbaceous plant in moist, shaded to partial shaded areas, such as creeks and wetlands. It thrives in pleiotrophic soils, along creek lines and moist forest grounds, such as Coastal Swamp Oak Forests.

It is native to Queensland.

In New South Wales, it is found mainly in coastal areas and disturbed areas, north from the Illawarra district, inland to Dorrigo and upper Clarence River. Its altitudinal range is from near sea level to 1,000 m (3,300 ft).

== Cultivation ==
It is cultivated as a houseplant and a garden plant namely for its large, exotic looking leaves and perfumed flowers. It thrives in bright sunlight when grown indoors, though the afternoon sun can bleach the leaves. In the garden, it does well in partial shade, though since it is a tropical plant it can be sensitive to cold or dry conditions and it requires high humidity levels to flourish. In the winter, the plant goes through a dormancy period. The plant benefits from a fertiliser in the growing season for nourishment. Mealybugs, spider mites and aphids are pests that commonly affect the plant.

== Chemistry ==
The plant is poisonous, and contact with the sap can lead to skin and eye irritation due to the presence of needle-like crystals of Calcium oxalate. Eating any part of the plant causes immediate pain, a burning sensation and swelling of the lips, tongue and mouth. A small number of children have died as a result of eating parts of the plant.

A percentage of people believe that newly-cut leaf stalks or stems of the plant will act as an antidote for the sting of the Stinging Tree, relieving the stinging pain.

== Gallery ==
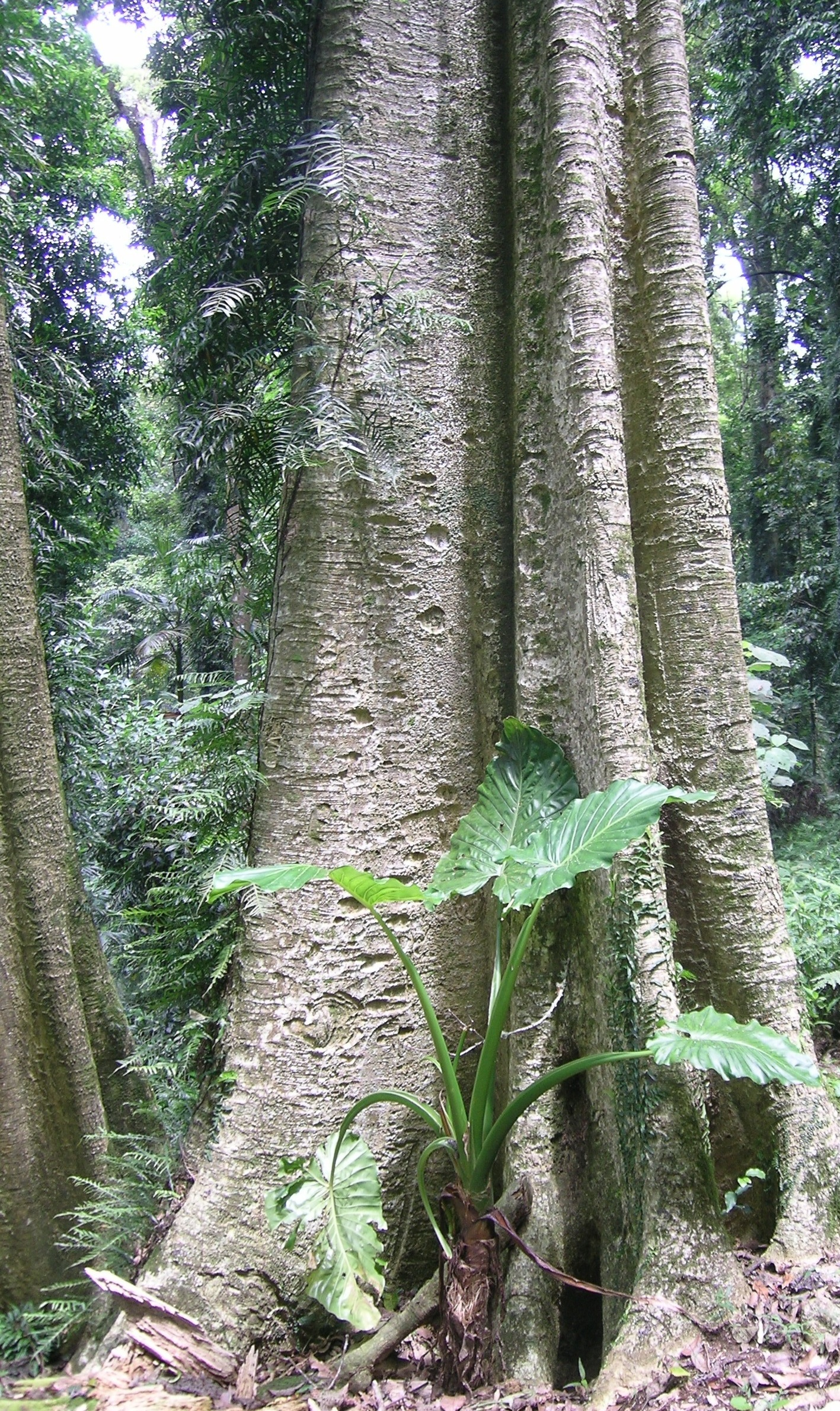
Alocasia brisbanensis (cunjevoi) growing at Dorrigo National Park, Australia

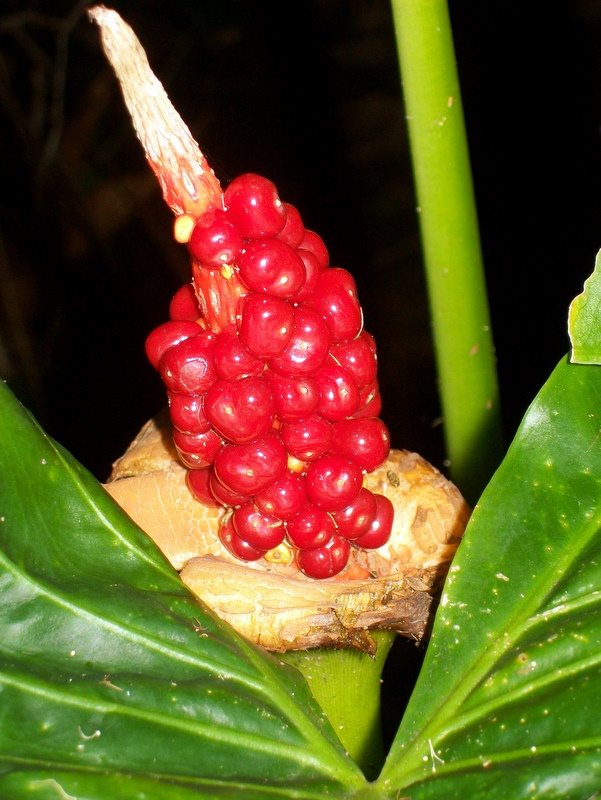
Fruiting Alocasia brisbanensis (cunjevoi) at Eastwood, Australia

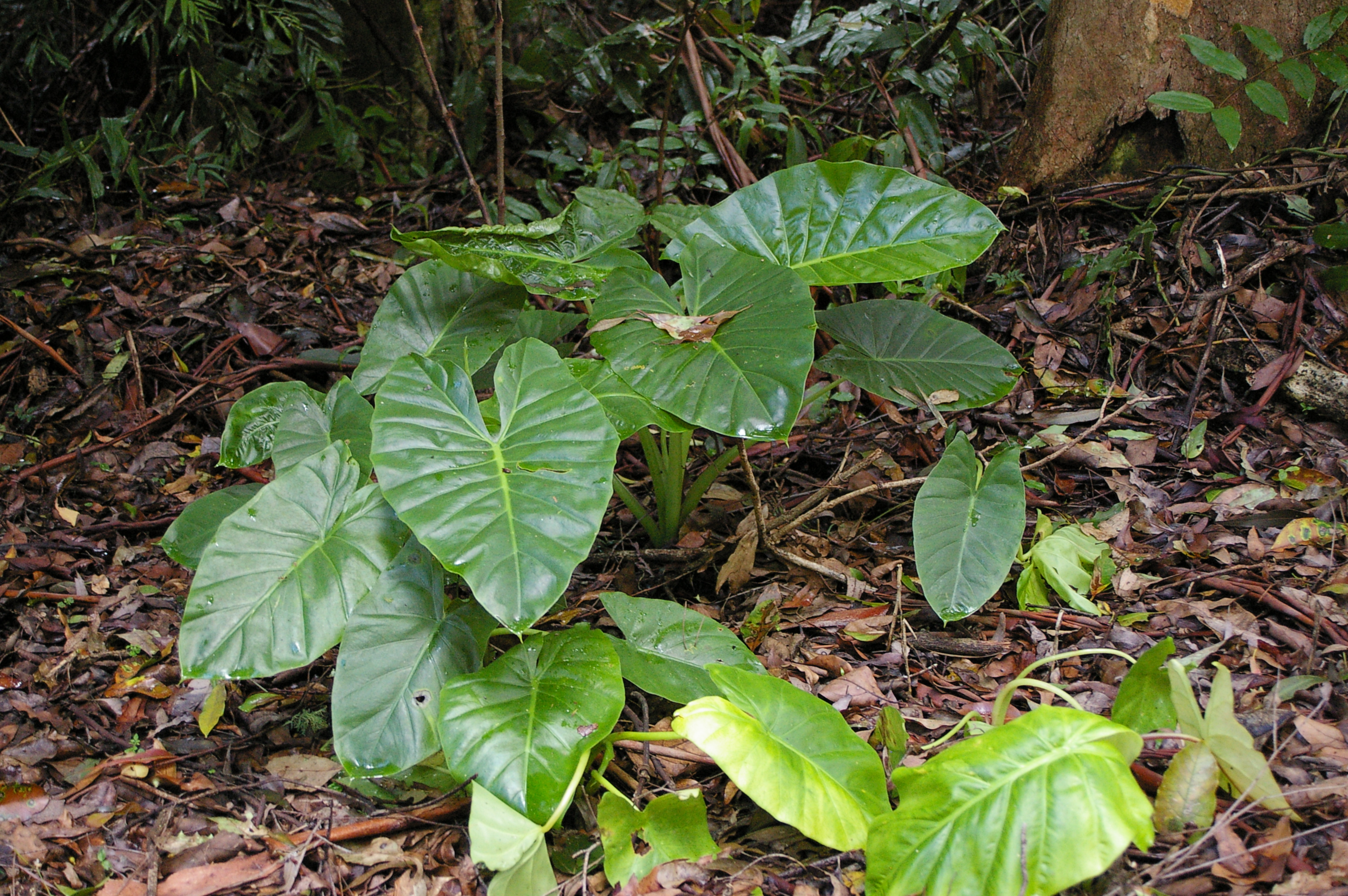
Growing as an understory plant at D'Aguilar National Park, Queensland

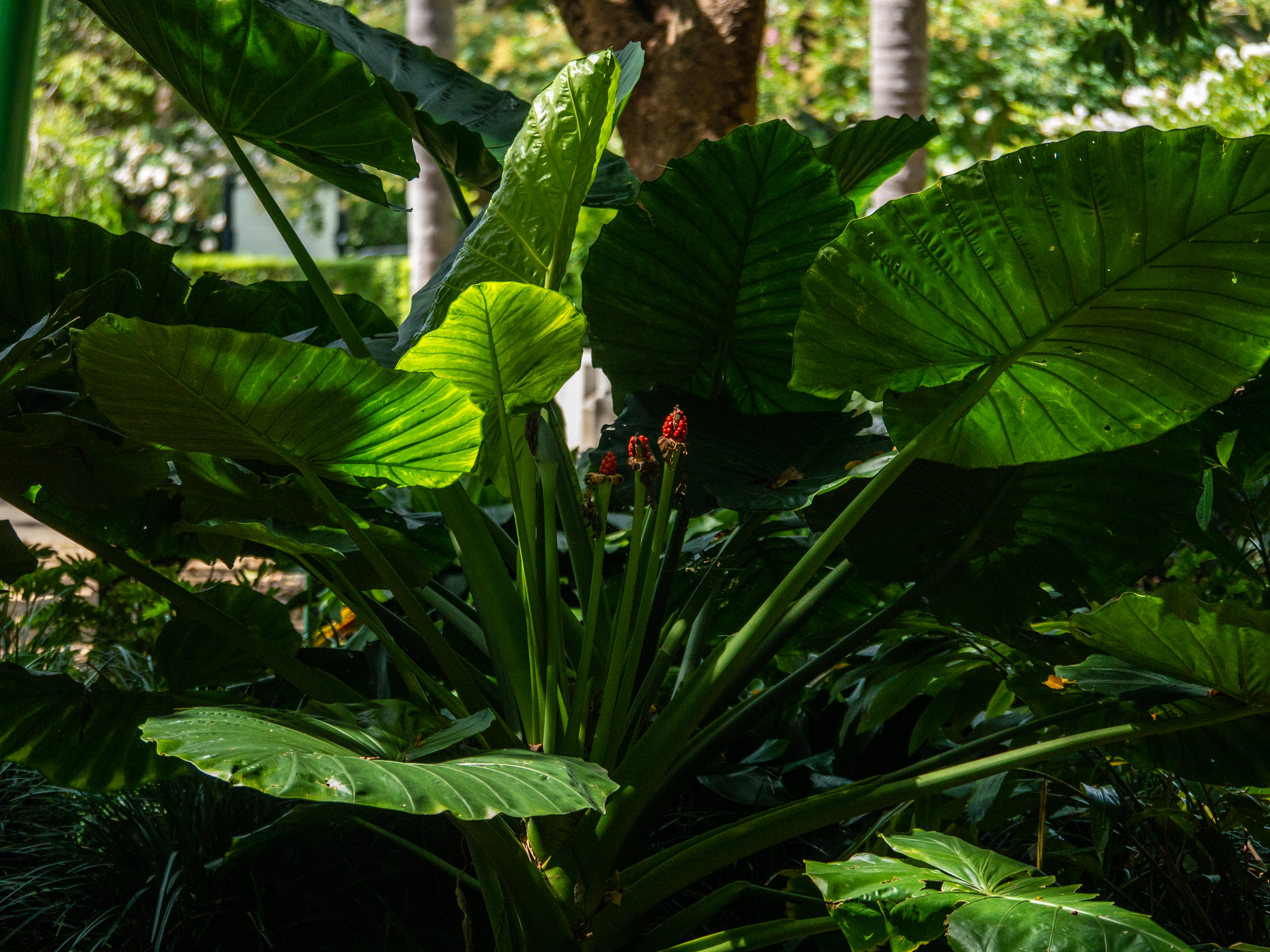
Foliage and fruit at City Botanic Gardens, Brisbane.

== See also ==
- List of plants known as lily
