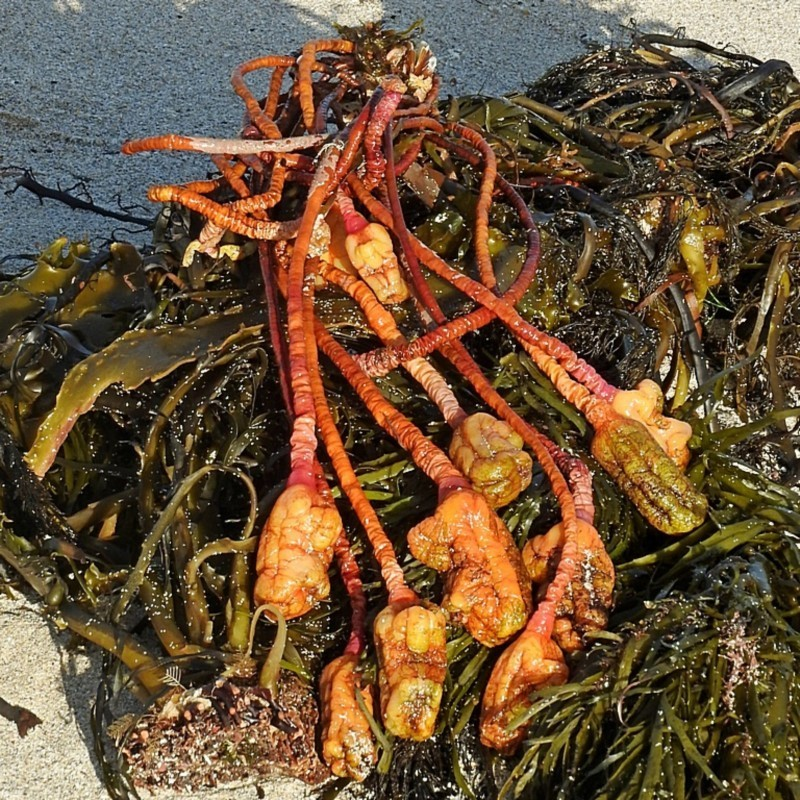
- Washed up onshore

Scientific classification
- Domain: Eukaryota
- Kingdom: Animalia
- Phylum: Chordata
- Subphylum: Tunicata
- Class: Ascidiacea
- Order: Stolidobranchia
- Family: Pyuridae
- Genus: Pyura
- Species: P. gibbosa

Binomial name
- Pyura gibbosa (Heller, 1878)

Synonyms
- Cynthia gibbosa Heller, 1878; Boltenia gibbosa (Heller, 1878)

= Pyura gibbosa =

Species of sea-squirt

Pyura gibbosa is a species of sea-squirt in the family, Pyuridae, and was first described in 1878 as Cynthia gibbosa by Camill Heller.

It is a sessile, subtropical species, found in the temperate seas of the coasts of all Australian states with the exception of the Northern Territory. It is hermaphroditic and both cross and self-fertilisation occurs. The eggs develop into larva before metamorphosing into adults.

A good description of the species is given by Patricia Kott in a 1985 paper.
