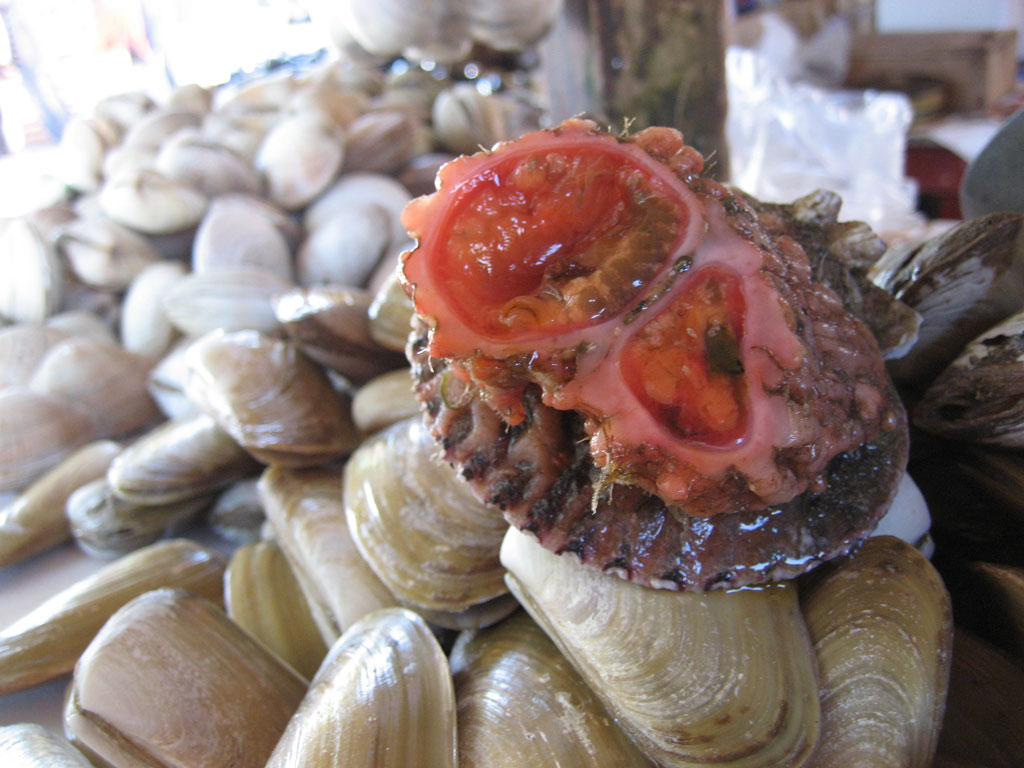
- Piure on a bed of clams, harvested in the Valparaíso Region

Scientific classification
- Kingdom: Animalia
- Phylum: Chordata
- Subphylum: Tunicata
- Class: Ascidiacea
- Order: Stolidobranchia
- Family: Pyuridae
- Genus: Pyura
- Species: P. chilensis

Binomial name
- Pyura chilensis (Molina, 1782)

= Pyura chilensis =

Species of sea squirt

Pyura chilensis, called piure in Spanish and piür or piwü in Mapudungun, is a tunicate of the family Pyuridae. It was described in 1782 by Juan Ignacio Molina.

== Taxonomy ==
The earliest mention of the P. chilensis was in 1782 by Juan Ignacio Molina in his book Saggio Sulla Storia Naturale del Chili. Molina, a Chilean abbot who was expelled from Chile along with the rest of the Jesuit missionaries, wrote this book to describe the life lived by the Chileans in the Chiloe Archipelago. He briefly describes the natives' fondness of fishing and mentions the piure as another form of sustenance for the people.

== Description ==
Pyura chilensis is a tunicate that somewhat resembles a mass of organs inside a rock. It is often found in dense aggregations in the intertidal and subtidal coast of Chile and Peru. It is a filter feeder that eats by sucking in seawater and filtering out microorganisms.

Pyura chilensis has some basic characteristics common to chordates, such as the notochord and a perforated pharynx. It is born male, becomes hermaphroditic at puberty, and reproduces by releasing clouds of sperm and eggs into the surrounding water. If alone, they will procreate by self-fertilization.

Its blood is clear and can contain high concentrations of vanadium, which may be ten million times that found in surrounding seawater, although the source and function of this element's concentrations are unknown.

== Fishery ==
On the Chilean coast, banks of P. chilensis are heavily fished. The animal is also one of the main food sources for other local aquatic species such as the Chilean abalone (Concholepas concholepas), whose proliferation has threatened P. chilensis and severely restricted its growth for more than two decades.

Many locals gather the delicacy, mostly in rocky areas close to shore, but occasionally farther out to sea.

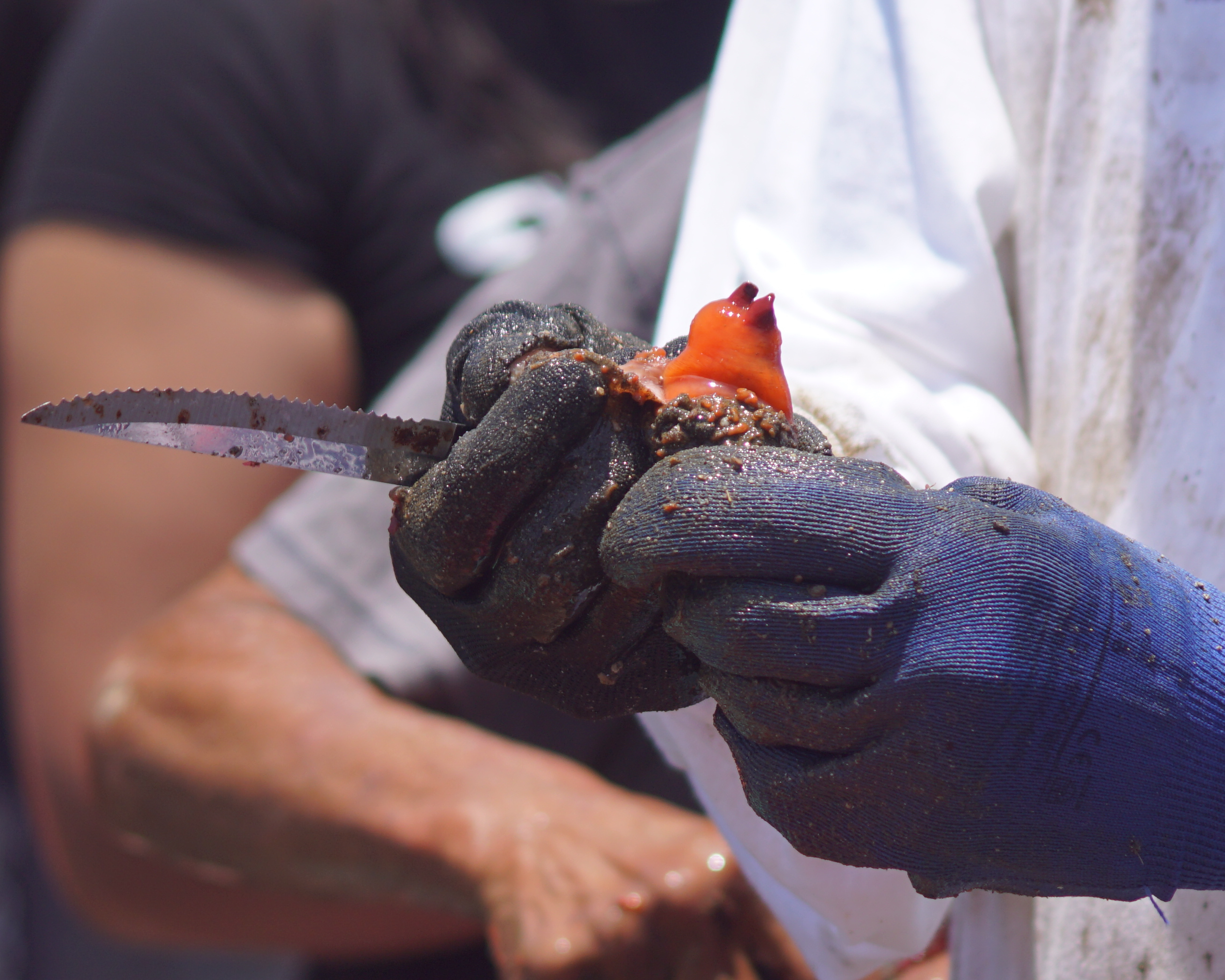
A specimen of Pyura chilensis being cut open to pull out the siphons from the carapace in the port of Arica, Chile.

Fishermen typically cut P. chilensis into slices with a handsaw, then use their fingers to pull out the siphons (which they refer to as tetas, or "tits") from the carapace, which is discarded. The flesh is usually sold in strips, but may be canned. It is exported to numerous countries, including, as of 2007, Sweden (32.5% of exports) and Japan (24.2%).

== Cuisine ==
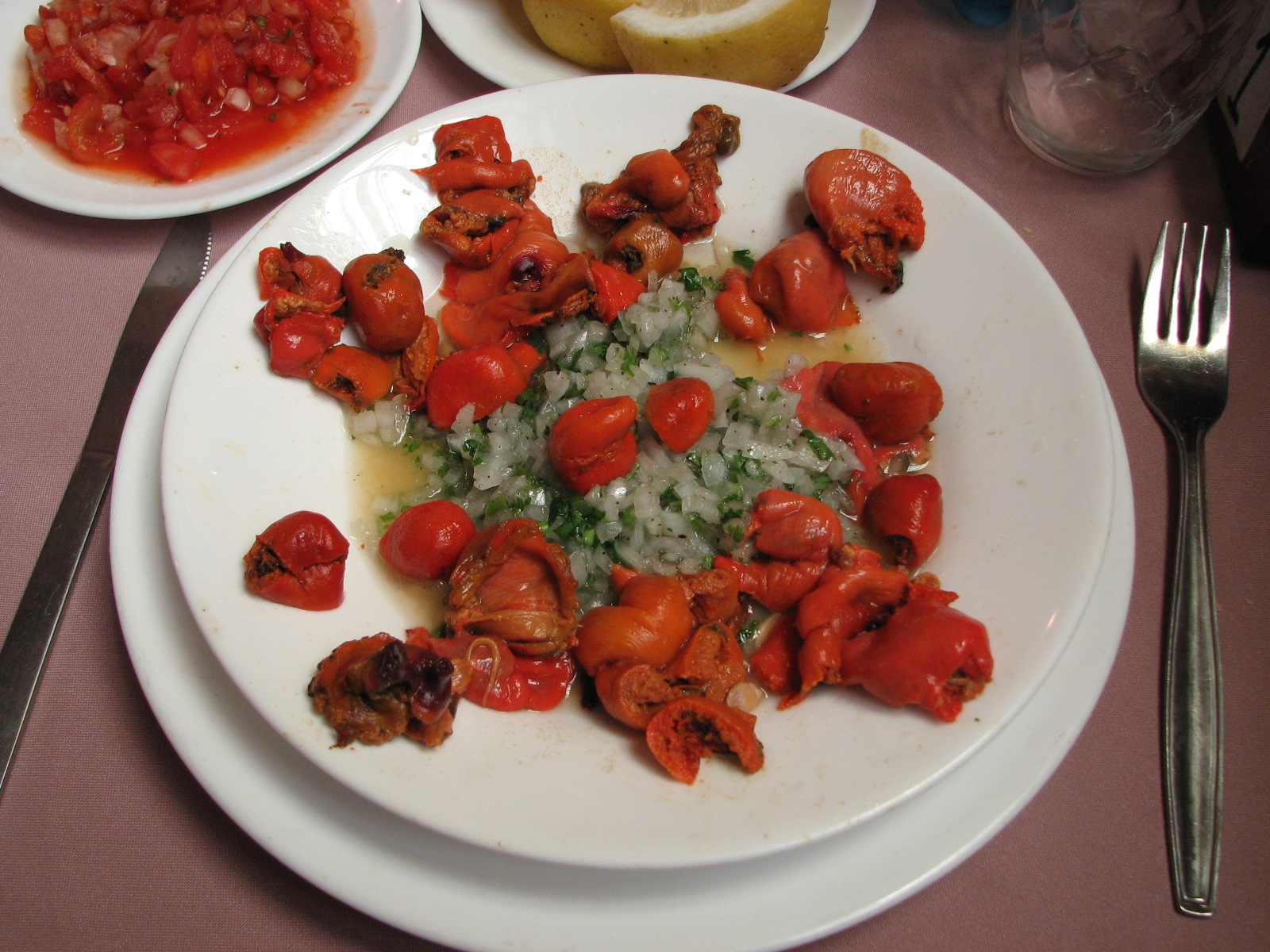
Raw piure in Valparaíso

The meat, which has a strong flavor, can be eaten raw or cooked. Its taste has been described as like that of iodine or "something like a sea urchin though less delicate in flavor" and a "slightly bitter, soapy taste". It is usually cut into small pieces, and flavored with chopped onion, cilantro, and lemon. Minced and boiled, it serves as an element of many dishes, particularly arroz con piure picado, or "rice with minced piure". It can also be fried and eaten on bread. A similar edible tunicate in the Mediterranean is Microcosmus sabatieri, also called a sea violet or sea fig.

P. chilensis has a high concentration of vanadium, with up to 1.9 mg/kg found in dry blood plasma.

== Effects on human reproduction ==
On Chiloé Island of Chile, women who consumed increased amounts of piure during pregnancy were purported to have had greater incidency of multiple births. However, the veracity of such claims, in light of mechanisms of human reproduction, remain dubious.

It is said to possess aphrodisiac properties and to have a significant sildenafil-like effect on men for a period of time after consumption.
