= Bogong =

Bogong may refer to:

- Bogong moth, a large Australian moth species
- Bogong, Victoria, a locality in Victoria, Australia
- Bogong High Plains, a region of Victoria, Australia
- County of Bogong, one of the 37 counties of Victoria, Australia
- Mount Bogong, a mountain in the region of Victoria, Australia
- Bogong, New South Wales a parish in the Snowy Mountains
