= Acacia anastema =

Sandridge gidgee

Conservation status
- Least Concern (IUCN 3.1)

Scientific classification
- Kingdom: Plantae
- Clade: Embryophytes
- Clade: Tracheophytes
- Clade: Spermatophytes
- Clade: Angiosperms
- Clade: Eudicots
- Clade: Rosids
- Order: Fabales
- Family: Fabaceae
- Subfamily: Caesalpinioideae
- Clade: Mimosoid clade
- Genus: Acacia
- Species: A. anastema

Binomial name
- Acacia anastema Maslin

Synonyms
- Racosperma anastema (Maslin) Pedley

Species of legume

Acacia anastema, commonly known as sandridge gidgee or sandplain gidgee, is a species of flowering plant in the family Fabaceae and is endemic to a fairly small area of semi-arid land east of Carnarvon. It is a tree with linear phyllodes, spikes of golden yellow flowers, and pods up to 140 mm (5.5 in) long.

== Description ==
Acacia anastema is a tree that typically grows to a height of up to 6 m (20 ft) with more or less sticky branches and up to 3 trunks. Its phyllodes are linear, flat and curved, 110–320 mm (4.3–12.6 in) long, 2–6 mm (0.079–0.236 in) wide and leathery. The flowers are borne in a spike 20–40 mm (0.79–1.57 in) long and 6–8 mm (0.24–0.31 in) wide, in the axils on a peduncle 10–20 mm (0.39–0.79 in) long, each spike with densely crowded golden yellow flowers. Flowering occurs from July to September and the fruit is a linear-cylindrical pod up to 140 mm (5.5 in) long and 2–3 mm (0.079–0.118 in) wide containing seeds 5.0–5.5 mm (0.20–0.22 in) long.

== Taxonomy ==
Acacia anastema was first formally described in 1983 by Bruce Maslin in the journal Nuytsia from specimens he collected on the road to Towrana station in 1981. The specific epithet (anastema) means 'upwards thread', and refers to the tall growth habit of the species.

== Distribution and habitat ==
This species of Acacia grows on sand dunes and sand ridges between Woodleigh station and Ellavalla Station in the Carnarvon bioregion in Northern Western Australia.

== See also ==
- List of Acacia species
