= Coolabah =

Coolabah may refer to:-

- Eucalyptus coolabah, a species of Eucalyptus, once considered conspecific with Eucalyptus microtheca
- Eucalyptus microtheca, a species of Eucalyptus, commonly known as coolabah
- SS Coolabah, an Australian steamship in service 1952-56
- Coolabah, New South Wales
