= Djanga =

Djanga, also spelt djanak or djăndga, supposedly meaning "white spirits", was the initial name given to Europeans by the Australian Aboriginal people of the south-west corner of Western Australia, the Noongar people.

Traditional people, relating to the human and natural world through complex systems of kin groups, sought to find a way to incorporate Europeans into their cultural understandings. They had observed that European ships came from the west from the direction of the setting sun, which is also the direction of Kuranup, what they believed to be the land of the departed spirits of the dead. The fact that Europeans seemed ignorant of Aboriginal languages and culture confirmed for the Noongar that these people had somehow forgotten who they were and where t from, typical of the spirit of a dead person.

The notion that Europeans were returned spirits of the dead was reported in the case of George Grey, who was recognised by one Aboriginal woman as the spirit of her dead son. Despite offers from fellow Europeans to drive the woman and her family away, Grey accepted the association, allowing a kenning (or corroboree) to be performed by the family in his honour.

The association of Europeans with the spirits of the dead was confirmed by many other characteristics of the first settlement. Europeans odours were found offensive to Aboriginal people, as clothes were frequently not washed for long periods, and bathing of the British settlers was not frequent. The odours were considered similar to the odours that accompanied corpses. Similarly, as the Indigenous peoples did not have resistance to many diseases that accompanied the Europeans (measles epidemics swept through the state repeatedly in the early 1930s killing many Aboriginal people, and Aboriginal people were not included in smallpox vaccination programs made available to white settlers.

These findings may account in part for the attempts of Aboriginal people, after an initial period of welcome and trade, to withdraw from further contact for a while. (Other reasons include the expropriation of Aboriginal lands and territories, the indiscriminate killing of kangaroo and other Australian wildlife by Europeans, and the violent punishment meted out to Aboriginal people for spearing European livestock or for digging traditional "bush tucker" from European claimed land).

Djanga has not been used for Europeans much since the 1940s. The term used by Noongar and other Western Australian Aboriginal Groups for European settlers now is "Wetjala", derived from the English term "white fella".
