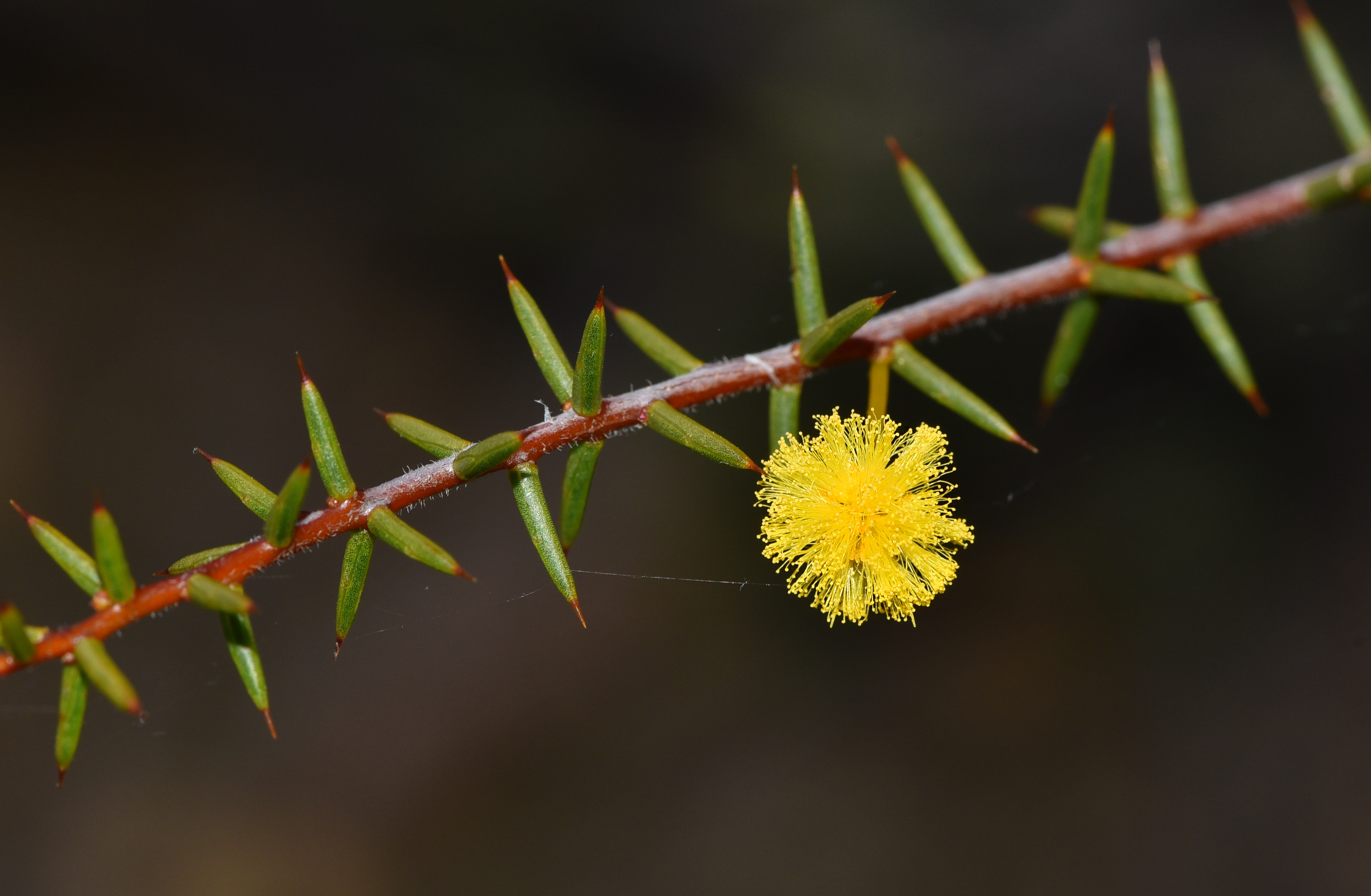
- Subspecies sphacelata

Scientific classification
- Kingdom: Plantae
- Clade: Embryophytes
- Clade: Tracheophytes
- Clade: Spermatophytes
- Clade: Angiosperms
- Clade: Eudicots
- Clade: Rosids
- Order: Fabales
- Family: Fabaceae
- Subfamily: Caesalpinioideae
- Clade: Mimosoid clade
- Genus: Acacia
- Species: A. sphacelata

Binomial name
- Acacia sphacelata Benth.
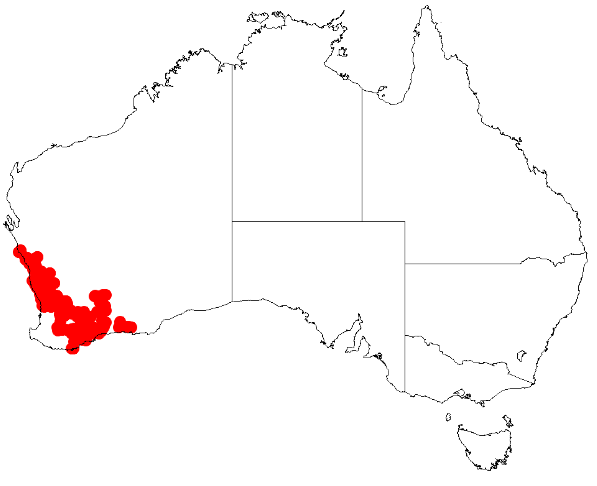
- Occurrence data from AVH

= Acacia sphacelata =

Species of legume

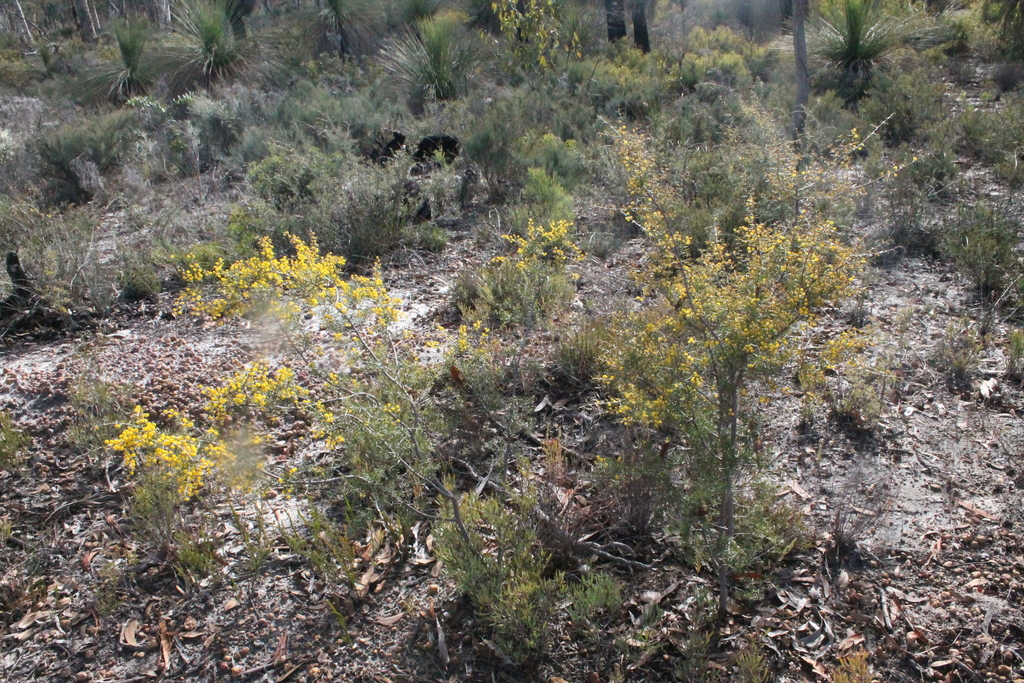
Habit near Mundaring

Acacia sphacelata is a shrub of the genus Acacia and the subgenus Phyllodineae that is endemic to south western Australia.

== Description ==
The harsh shrub typically grows to a height of 0.2 to 2.0 metres (0.7 to 6.6 ft). It has light grey to mid-grey coloured bark and glabrous to minutely hairy and rigid branchlets with persistent or caducous stipules that have a length of 1 to 2 mm (0.039 to 0.079 in). Like most species of Acacia it has phyllodes rather than true leaves. The scattered, patent, linear or nearly lanceolate phyllodes form in whorls around the stem and have no stems. The evergreen phyllodes are straight to shallowly curved and quadrangular or flat with a length of 6 to 25 mm (0.24 to 0.98 in) and a width of 0.6 to 2 mm (0.024 to 0.079 in) and are smooth, pungent, glabrous, rigid and pungent with five main nerves. It blooms from April to September and produces yellow flowers. The simple inflorescences usually occur singly in the axils on stalks that are 3 to 13 mm (0.12 to 0.51 in) in length. The showy spherical flower-heads contain 13 to 50 bright yellow flowers. After flowering papery to crustaceous seed pods form that have a narrowly oblong to linear shape. The glabrous pods have a length of up to 4 cm (1.6 in) and a width of 2.5 to 7 mm (0.098 to 0.276 in) containing longitudinally arranged seeds inside. The dark brown to black coloured arillate seeds have a length of 2.5 to 5 mm (0.098 to 0.197 in).

== Taxonomy ==
The species was first formally described by the botanist George Bentham in 1842 as part of the William Jackson Hooker work Notes on Mimoseae, with a synopsis of species as published in the London Journal of Botany. It was reclassified as Racosperma sphacelatum by Leslie Pedley in 2003 then transferred back to the Acacia genus in 2006. The only other synonyms are Acacia sphacelata var. sphacelata, Acacia tamminensis and Acacia spacelata.

There are three recognised subspecies:

- Acacia sphacelata subsp. recurva
- Acacia sphacelata subsp. sphacelata
- Acacia sphacelata subsp. verticillata

== Distribution ==
It is native to an area in the Mid West, Wheatbelt and Goldfields-Esperance regions of Western Australia where it is often situated on undulating plains and lateritic rises where it grows in sandy, sandy-clay and loamy soils. The bulk of the population is found from around Port Gregory in the north west down to around the Stirling Range in the south and out to around Scaddan in the east.

== See also ==
- List of Acacia species
