= Acacia maitlandii =

Maitland's wattle
- In Charleville Botanical Reserve

Scientific classification
- Kingdom: Plantae
- Clade: Tracheophytes
- Clade: Angiosperms
- Clade: Eudicots
- Clade: Rosids
- Order: Fabales
- Family: Fabaceae
- Subfamily: Caesalpinioideae
- Clade: Mimosoid clade
- Genus: Acacia
- Species: A. maitlandii

Binomial name
- Acacia maitlandii F. Muell.
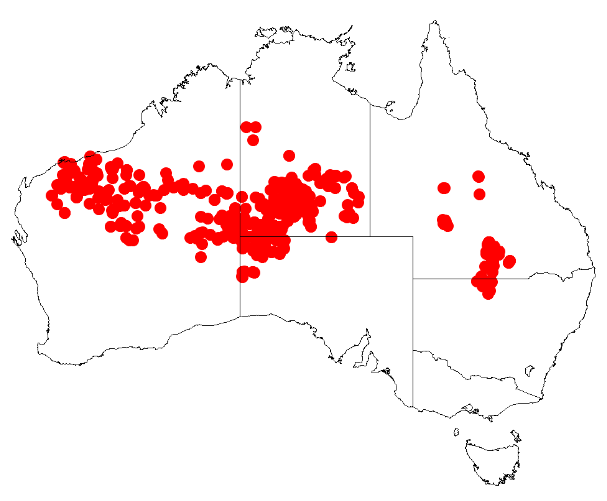
- Occurrence data from AVH

Synonyms
- Acacia maitlandi F.Muell. ex Benth. Acacia patens F.Muell. Racosperma maitlandii (F.Muell.) Pedley

Species of plant

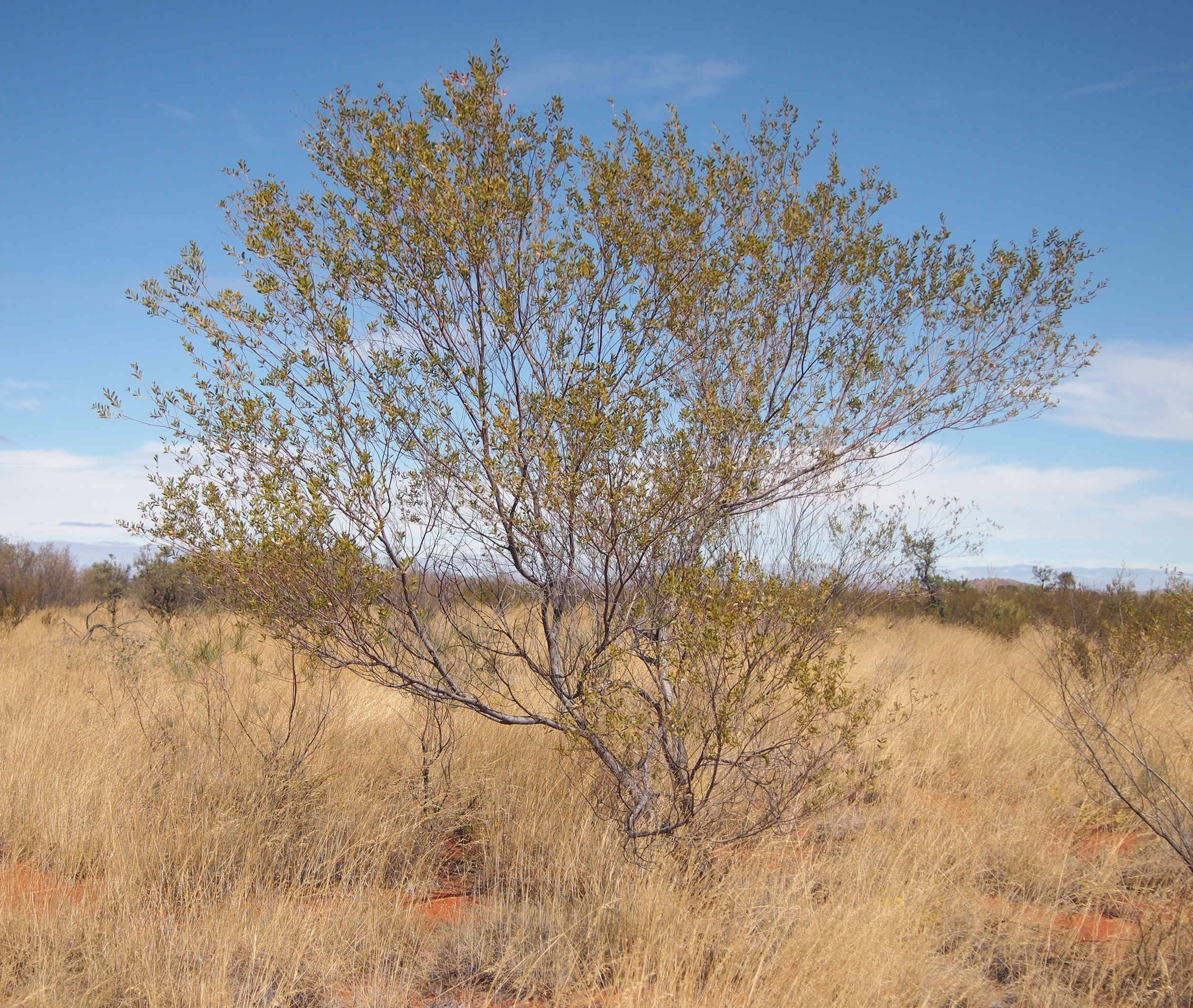
Habit about 70 km (43 mi) north-west of Alice Springs

Acacia maitlandii, commonly known as Maitland's wattle, spiky wattle, spiny-leaved wattle, garrga (by the Ngarluma and Yindjibarndi people) or as jumbingjar (by the Kurrama people) is a species of flowering plant in the family Fabaceae and is endemic to arid regions of Australia. It is an erect, openly branched shrub, with glabrous red to brown, resinous branchlets, narrowly elliptic to oblong phyllodes, spherical heads of golden yellow flowers, and firmly papery pods rounded over and slightly constricted between the seeds.

== Description ==
Acacia maitlandii is an erect, openly branched, usually rather straggly shrub that typically grows to a height of 0.7–3.0 m (2 ft 4 in – 9 ft 10 in) and has red to brown, more or less terete, glabrous, sticky, resinous branchlets. Its phyllodes are more or less straight, narrowly elliptic to oblong, 7–25 mm (0.28–0.98 in) long, 2–4 mm (0.079–0.157 in) wide with a sharply pointed tip and a prominent midrib. The pulvinus is yellow, 0.5 mm (0.020 in) long, and there are erect stipules 0.5–1.5 mm (0.020–0.059 in) long and the base of the phyllodes, but often enveloped in resin. The flowers are borne in a spherical head in axils, on a glabrous peduncle 10–20 mm (0.39–0.79 in) long, the heads about 9 mm (0.35 in) long, with 50 to 90 densely arranged golden yellow flowers. Flowering occurs from May to September, and the pods are glabrous, firmly papery, 20–76 mm (0.79–2.99 in) long, mostly 4–5 mm (0.16–0.20 in) wide, rounded over and slightly constricted between the seeds. The seeds are elliptic to egg-shaped, 3.5–4.5 mm (0.14–0.18 in) long and dark brown, slightly mottled cream-coloured and lack an aril.

== Taxonomy ==
Acacia maitlandii was first formally described in 1862 by Ferdinand von Mueller in his Fragmenta Phytographiae Australiae from specimens collected by Maitland Brown in the Hamersley Range during the Gregory expedition. The specific epithet (maitlandii) honours the collector of the type specimens.

== Distribution and habitat ==
Maitland's wattle occurs in all mainland states of Australia, except Victoria, and is not considered to be threatened with extinction. The favoured soil type is red sand, or stony ground on sandy or stony plains, and on hills.

== Uses ==
The species is used to make boomerangs and spearthrowers, and the gum produced is edible. The tree is called garrga in the languages of the Yindjibarndi and Ngarluma people. The seeds have been identified, analysed, and monitored, as a 'wild harvested Australian indigenous food', by Food Standards Australia New Zealand. The product is found to be very high in fats, over half by weight.

== See also ==
- List of Acacia species
