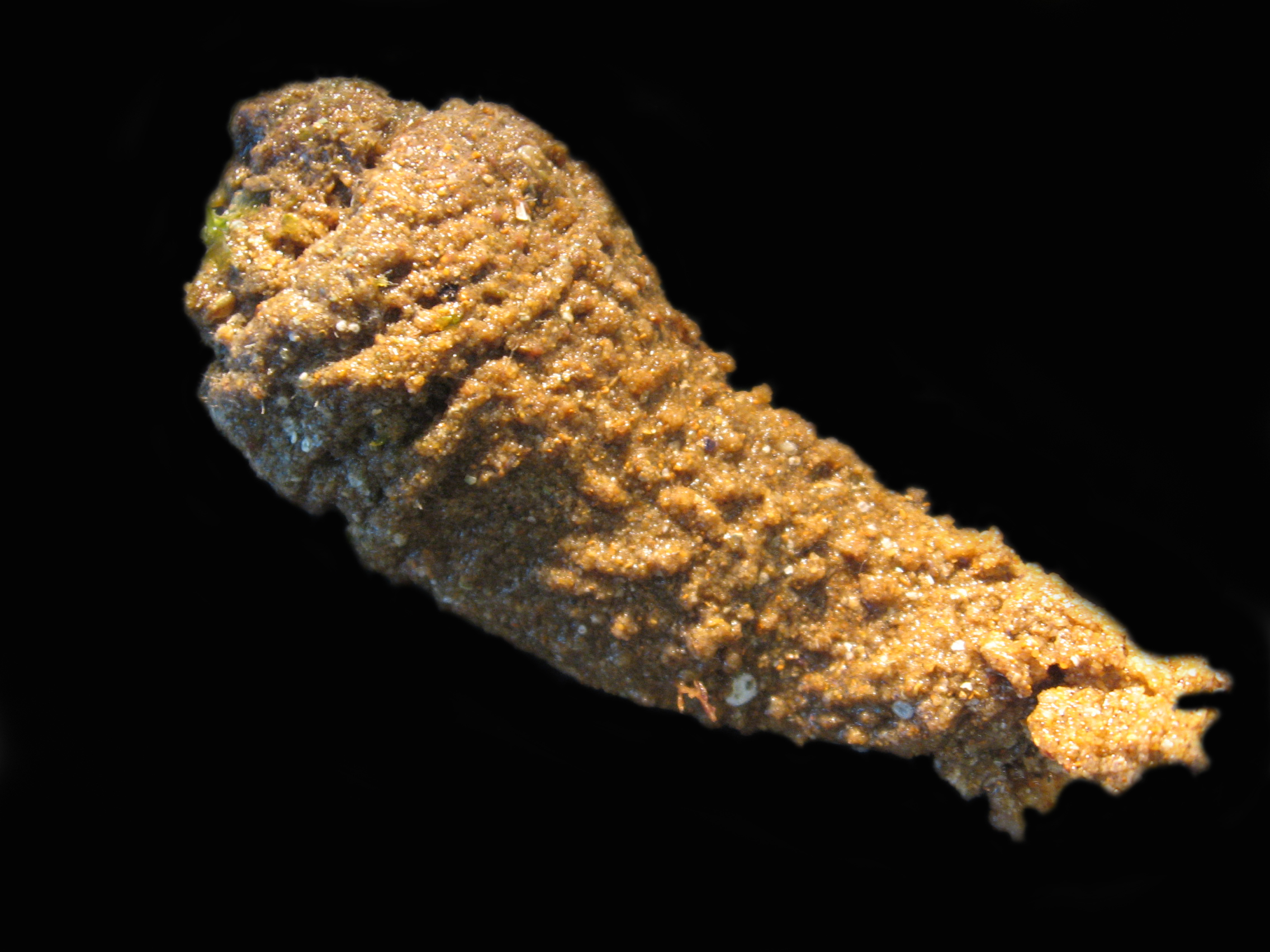

Scientific classification
- Domain: Eukaryota
- Kingdom: Animalia
- Phylum: Chordata
- Subphylum: Tunicata
- Class: Ascidiacea
- Order: Stolidobranchia
- Family: Pyuridae
- Genus: Pyura
- Species: P. praeputialis

Binomial name
- Pyura praeputialis (Heller, 1878)

= Pyura praeputialis =

Species of sea squirt

Pyura praeputialis is an intertidal and shallow water species of tunicate. It is one of three species of "cunjevoi" in Australasia (the other two being the yellow cunjevoi P. dalbyi and the doppelganger cunjevoi P. doppelgangera). It is the first reported species of marine organism to create a "foam-nest" for its larvae.

== Distribution ==
Pyura praeputialis is common in coastal areas of the Australian mainland and ranges from southern Queensland to Cape Otway in Victoria. It is a non-indigenous species in Antofagasta, Chile.

This species is an ecosystem engineer that can drastically alter habitats by overgrowing other sessile marine invertebrates. This makes it a likely problem species when introduced to new habitats. However, the positive impacts it can have are shelter for juveniles that are being hunted, protection from desiccation, beneficial interactions between organisms, and coexistence of other species.

== Taxonomy ==
This species is part of the "P. stolonifera species complex", a group of large tunicates that are all often referred to as P. stolonifera (a species endemic to temperate southern Africa). It is also sometimes called "P. stolonifera praeputialis". Compared to other species in the species complex that have onion-shaped bodies, P. praeputialis is taller, cylindrical in shape and often has a greater diameter at the top than at the base.

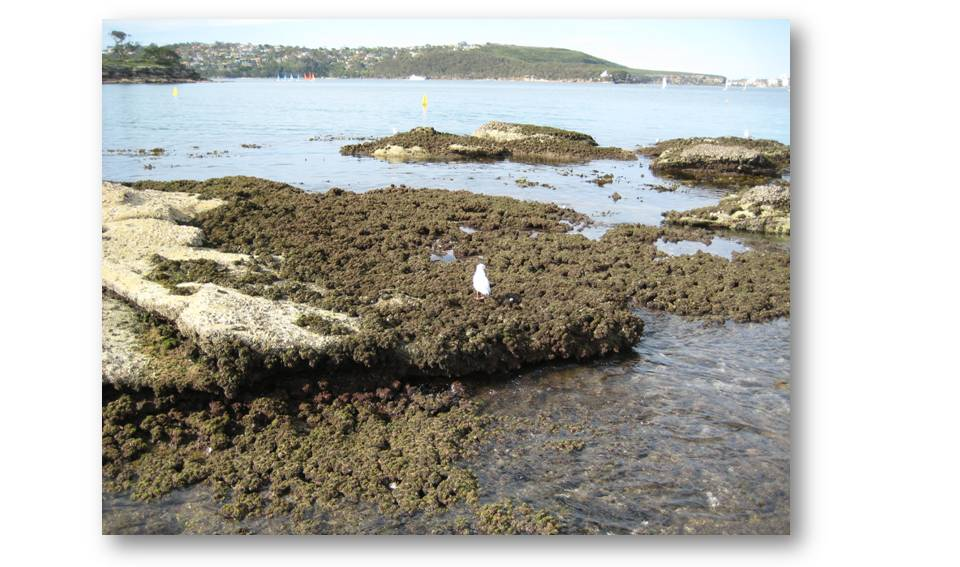
A dense aggregation of Pyura praeputialis on a rock platform in Balmoral, Sydney Harbour
