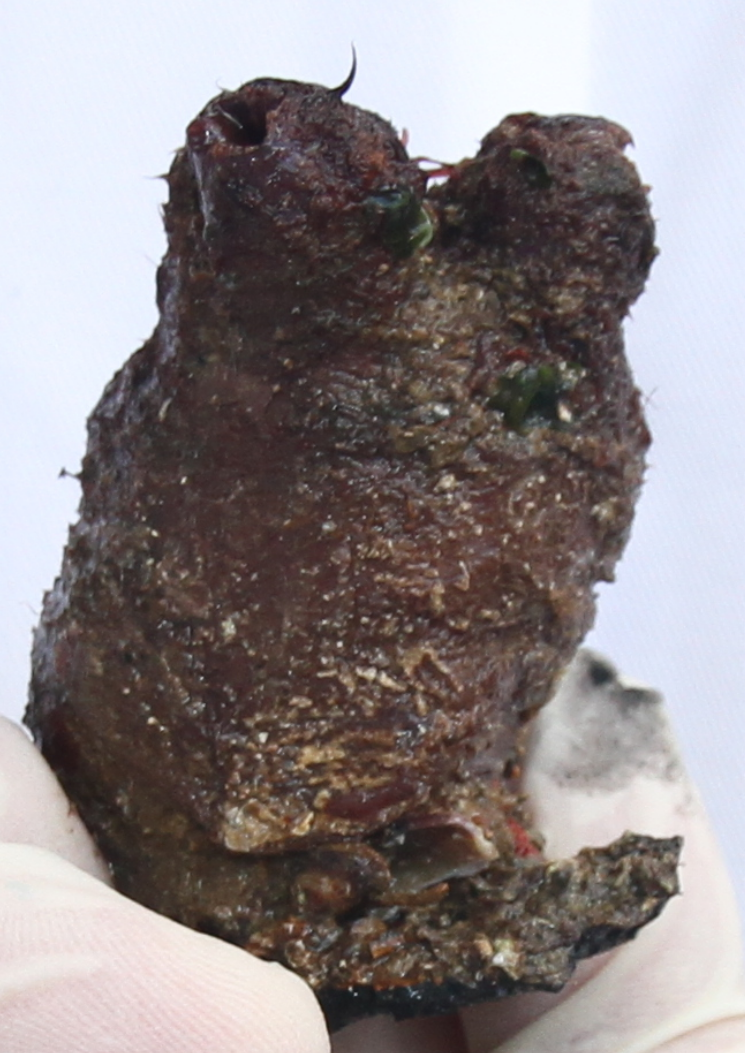

Scientific classification
- Domain: Eukaryota
- Kingdom: Animalia
- Phylum: Chordata
- Subphylum: Tunicata
- Class: Ascidiacea
- Order: Stolidobranchia
- Family: Pyuridae
- Genus: Pyura
- Species: P. doppelgangera

Binomial name
- Pyura doppelgangera Rius & Teske, 2013

= Pyura doppelgangera =

Species of sea squirt

Pyura doppelgangera, the doppelganger cunjevoi, is a tunicate that lives in coastal waters of Australasia attached to rocks or artificial structures.

== Distribution ==
This species is particularly common in Tasmania. It has also been reported from South Gippsland, Victoria (Port Welshpool and Port Albert), South Australia (Adelaide) and the extreme north of New Zealand's North Island. Genetic data from rapidly mutating microsatellites indicate that the species is native to Tasmania and that all non-Tasmanian populations were introduced through human activities during the period of European settlement. The invasion success of the introduced populations varies depending on the presence of suitable substrates. While the species is rapidly expanding its range in New Zealand (where rocky shore habitat is continuous), the invasion of South Australia has stalled because the region mostly has sandy beaches, and settlement is limited to artificial structures.

== Description ==
Pyura doppelgangera usually does not grow taller than about 50–60 mm. It has a brown tunic that has sand embedded in it.

== Taxonomy ==
Pyura doppelgangera is a member of the "P. stolonifera species complex", which includes at least five species of large, solitary ascidians that are all often incorrectly referred to as P. stolonifera in the literature. It shares a recent ancestor with P. praeputialis, a larger species commonly referred to a "cunjevoi" or "cunjie", which is common in coastal areas of the south-eastern Australian mainland and which is a non-indigenous species in Antofagasta, Chile. Although a difference exists regarding the maximum body size of these closely related species, they are indistinguishable externally. Genetic methods have recovered the two species as highly distinct evolutionary lineages.

== Etymology ==
The species is named Pyura doppelgangera after the German word Doppelgänger, which in its narrowest sense means "look-alike" (i.e. somebody who closely resembles somebody else). The name reflects the difficulty in distinguishing this species from P. praeputialis because of their very similar morphology.
