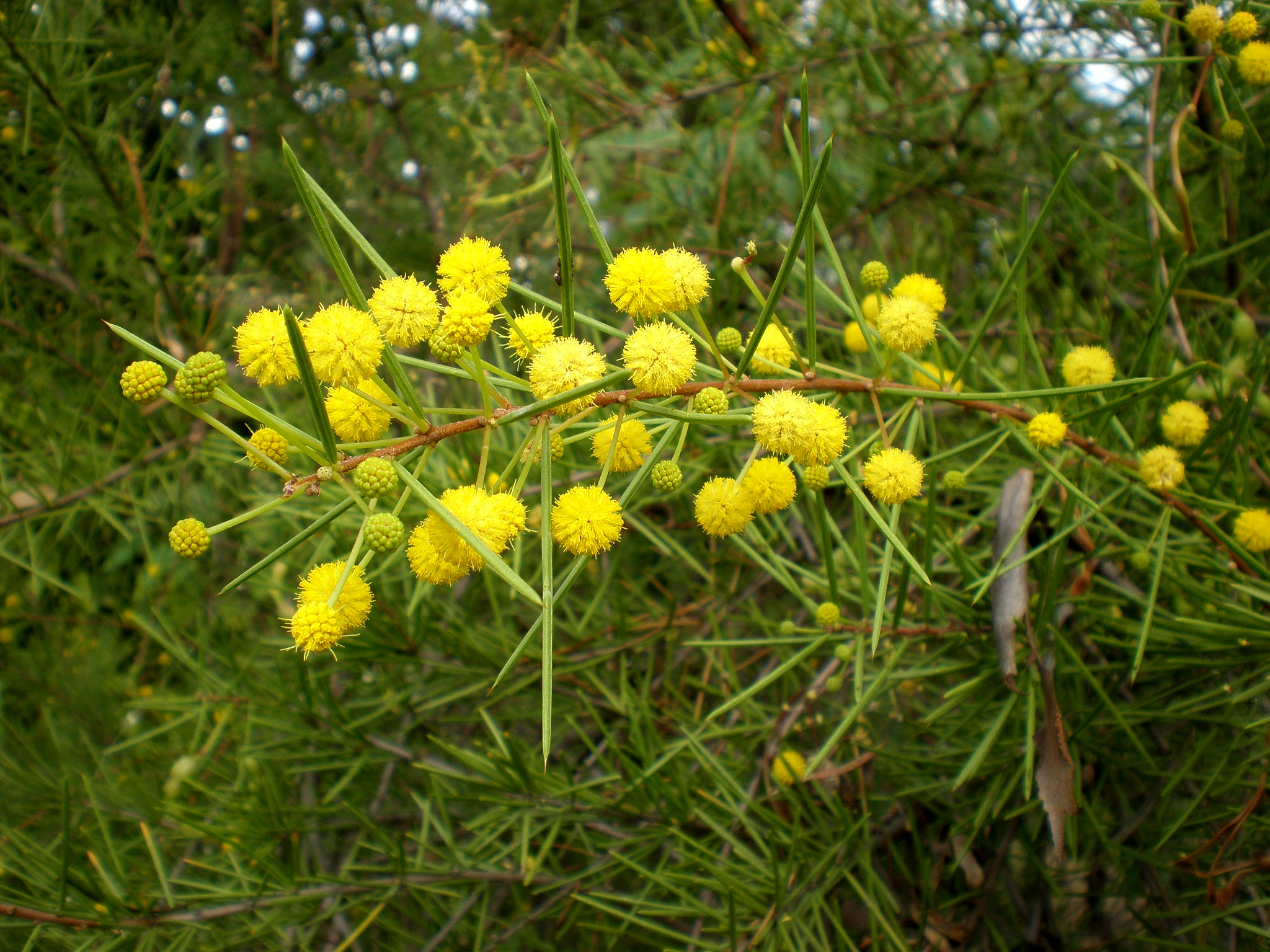

Scientific classification
- Kingdom: Plantae
- Clade: Embryophytes
- Clade: Tracheophytes
- Clade: Spermatophytes
- Clade: Angiosperms
- Clade: Eudicots
- Clade: Rosids
- Order: Fabales
- Family: Fabaceae
- Subfamily: Caesalpinioideae
- Clade: Mimosoid clade
- Genus: Acacia
- Species: A. tetragonophylla

Binomial name
- Acacia tetragonophylla F.Muell.
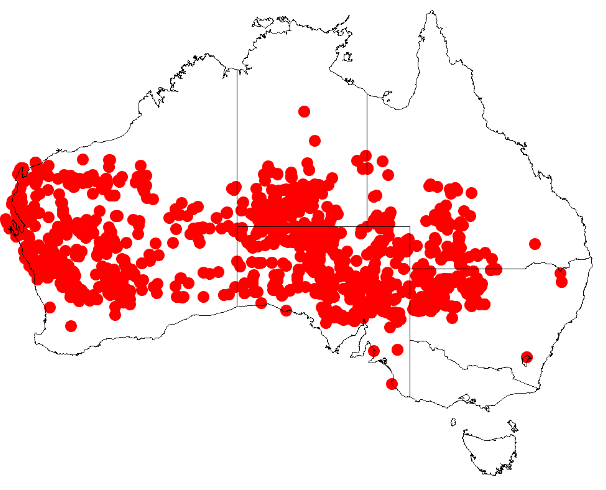
- Occurrence data from AVH

= Acacia tetragonophylla =

Curara

Species of plant

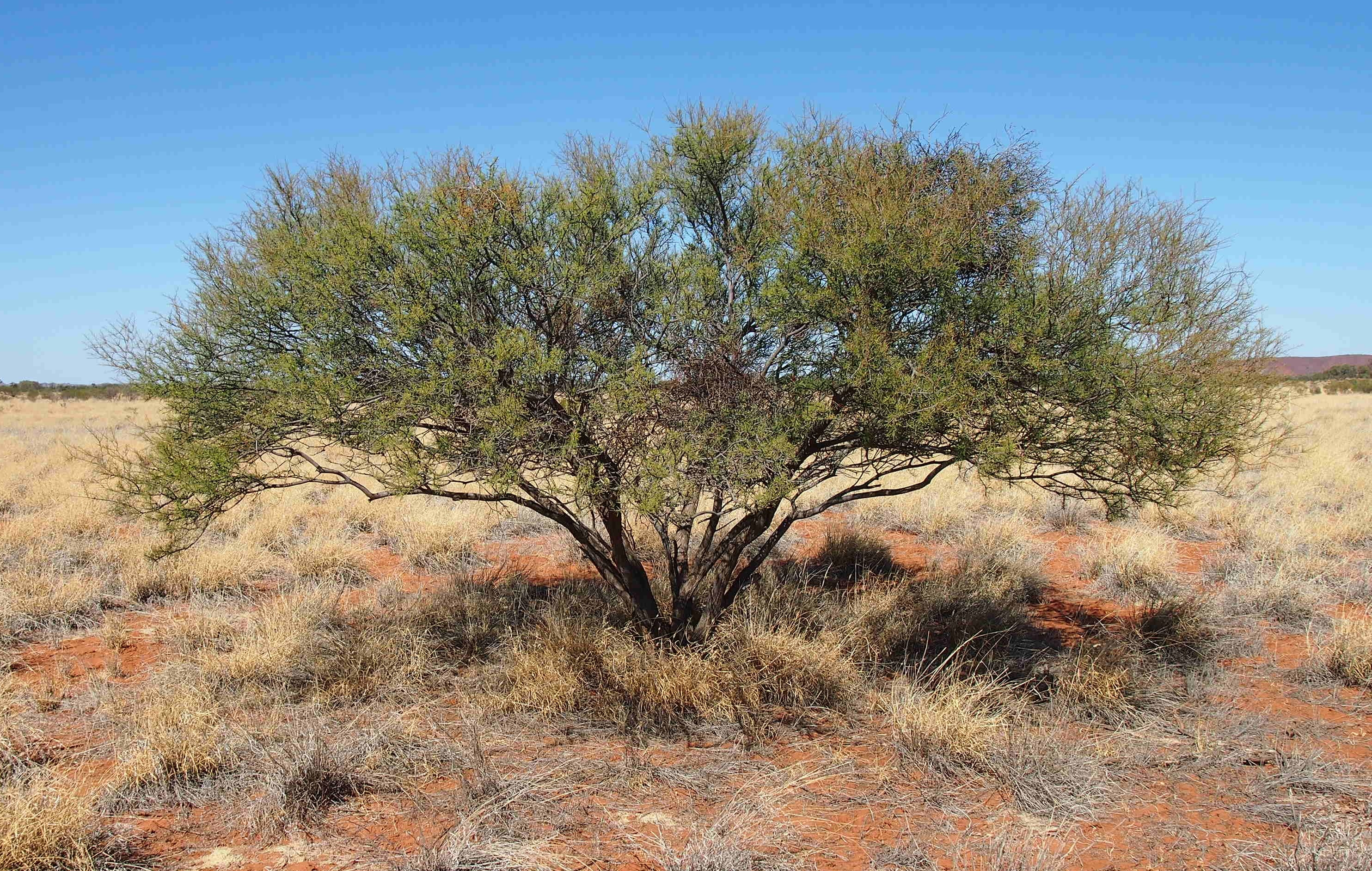
Habit

Acacia tetragonophylla commonly known as curara, kurara or dead finish, is a flowering plant in the family Fabaceae that is endemic to arid and semi-arid parts of central and western Australia. It is a tall, prickly shrub with round, yellow ball flowers.

== Description ==
Curara grows as a tall shrub or small tree up to a height of 1.5 to 5 m (4 ft 11 in to 16 ft 5 in) and has an intricate and often straggly habit with glabrous branchlets. Like most Acacia species, it has phyllodes rather than true leaves. These are slender and needle-like with a length of 1 to 5 cm (0.39 to 1.97 in) and a width of 1 mm (0.039 in). When young they are soft and pliable, but as they mature they become hard, rigid and very sharp. The glabrous phyllodes are formed in groups of two to six on dwarf, knotty and lateral branchlets or singly on new shoots. The phyllodes have a slender linear shape ending in a sharp point and are mostly pentagonal to compressed in cross-section with five to seven prominent nerves. In Western Australia it blooms between May and October producing yellow flowers. The flowers are yellow, and held in spherical clusters. The pods are papery, up to eight centimetres long and about five millimetres wide.

== Distribution ==
It occurs on floodplains and along watercourses in arid and semi-arid areas throughout Western Australia, South Australia, southern Northern Territory, and east to near Charleville, Queensland and Brewarrina, New South Wales and is known to grow in a variety of habitats and soil types. In Western Australia it is found in the Pilbara, Gascoyne, Mid West, Wheatbelt and Goldfields-Esperance regions.

== Taxonomy ==
The species was first formally described by the botanist Ferdinand von Mueller in 1863 as part of the work Fragmenta Phytographiae Australiae. It was reclassified as Racosperma tetragonophyllum by Leslie Pedley in 2003 then transferred back to genus Acacia in 2006. It is often confused with Acacia sphacelata.

== Uses ==
Aboriginal people in Central Australia collect the seeds to make seedcakes. Its name in Pitjantjajara is Wakalpuka.

Acacia tetragonophylla can be used to treat warts.

"A number of [Acacia tetragonophylla] phyllodes may be inserted into the wart, the main part then being broken off to leave the apices embedded in the wart. After four or five days the wart has shrivelled and may be removed easily."

== See also ==
- List of Acacia species
