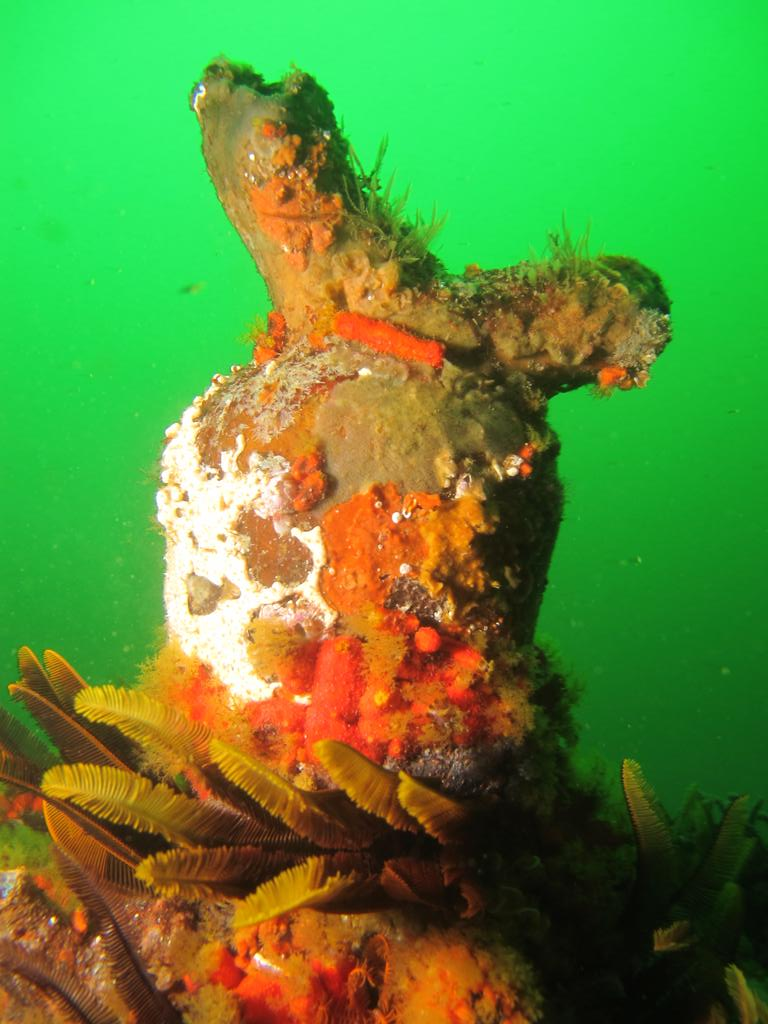

Scientific classification
- Kingdom: Animalia
- Phylum: Chordata
- Subphylum: Tunicata
- Class: Ascidiacea
- Order: Stolidobranchia
- Family: Pyuridae
- Genus: Pyura
- Species: P. stolonifera

Binomial name
- Pyura stolonifera (Heller, 1878)

= Pyura stolonifera =

Species of tunicates

Pyura stolonifera, commonly known in South Africa as "red bait" (or "rooiaas" in Afrikaans), is a sessile ascidian, or sea squirt, that lives in coastal waters attached to rocks or artificial structures. Sea squirts are named for their habit of squirting a stream of water from their exhalant siphons when touched at low tide.

== Description ==
Pyura stolonifera is a large solitary ascidian that can grow to over 15 cm in height.

Physical characteristics include:

- A thick pale outer tunic with a wrinkled brown surface
- Large inhalant and exhalant siphons with slightly scalloped edges
- A body often covered with encrusting organisms

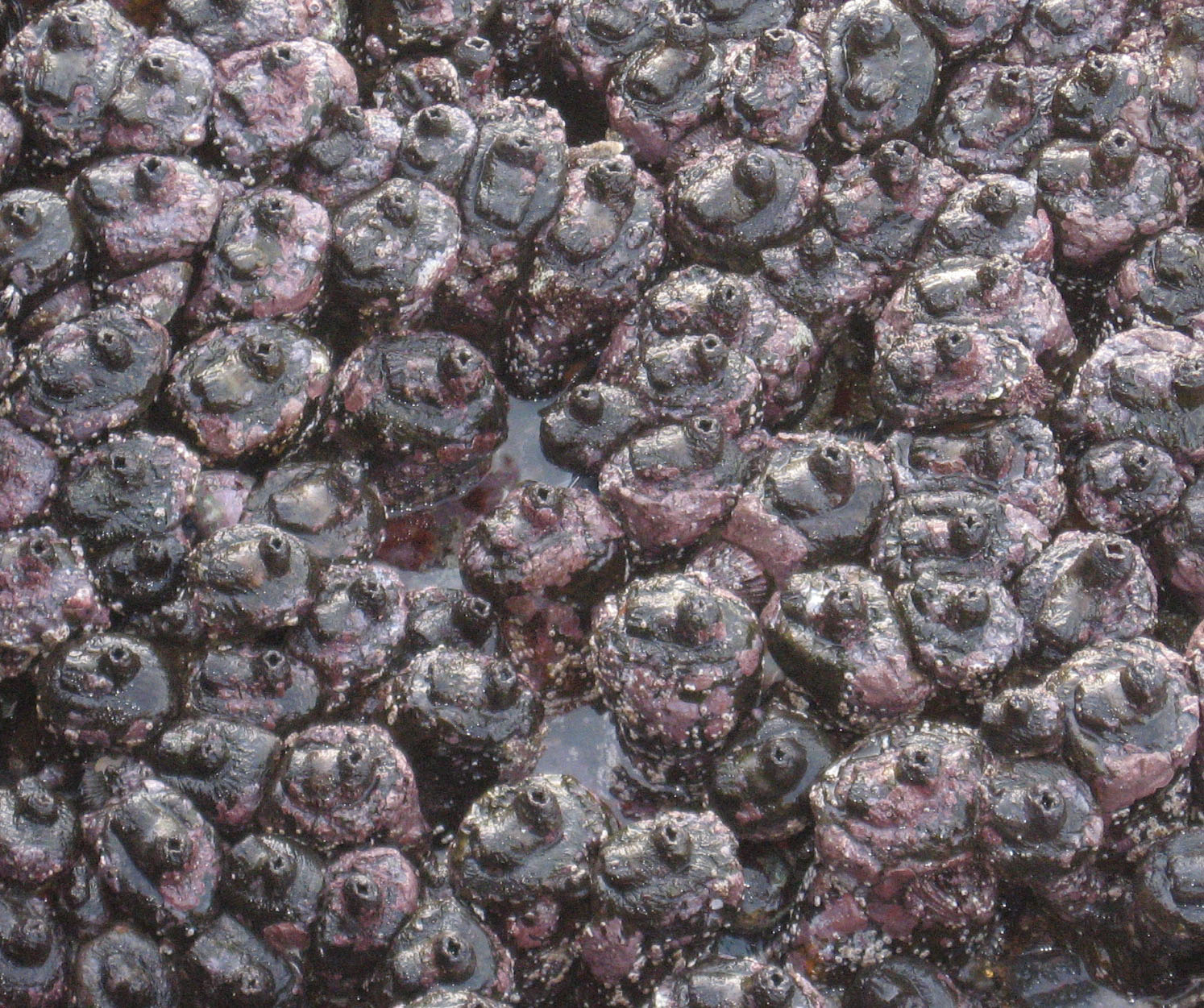
Pyura stolonifera is an ecosystem engineer that can drastically alter habitats. Dense aggregates like the one shown here can dominate all substrata from the mid-intertidal to the subtidal zone, exclude other sessile species, and provide habitat for other organisms (Photo: Marc Rius)

== Distribution ==
This species is found in coastal areas of the cool-temperate and warm-temperate marine bioregions of southern Africa, from Namibia on the west coast to south-eastern South Africa. It is absent from the region's subtropical and tropical bioregions.

Habitat range:

- Intertidal zone
- Subtidal waters to at least 10 m depth.

== Taxonomy ==
Despite being one of the world's most conspicuous sea squirts, Pyura stolonifera is often confused with other, morphologically similar ascidians. It is the namesake of the so-called "P. stolonifera species complex" because the name P. stolonifera is often indiscriminately applied to all of them. The species complex presently includes the following species:

- Pyura herdmani (Herdman's red bait), an African species whose range spans the temperate, subtropical and tropical marine bioregions of southern Africa, and that has also been reported from north-western Africa. Genetic data indicate that this species comprises at least three distinct evolutionary lineages, each of which may represent a distinct species: a temperate southern African form that often shares its habitat with P. stolonifera, a subtropical/tropical southern African form, and a north-western African form.
- Pyura praeputialis, commonly known as "cunjevoi" or "cunjie", is common in coastal areas of the Australian mainland and ranges from southern Queensland to Cape Otway in Victoria. It is a non-indigenous species in Antofagasta, Chile.
- Pyura doppelgangera (doppelganger cunjevoi) is morphologically very similar to P. praeputialis, but is usually smaller. It is particularly common in Tasmania but has also been reported from mainland Australia (Victoria and South Australia) and New Zealand.
- Pyura dalbyi (yellow cunjevoi) is common in Victoria. A small, geographically isolated population has been reported from Albany, Western Australia.

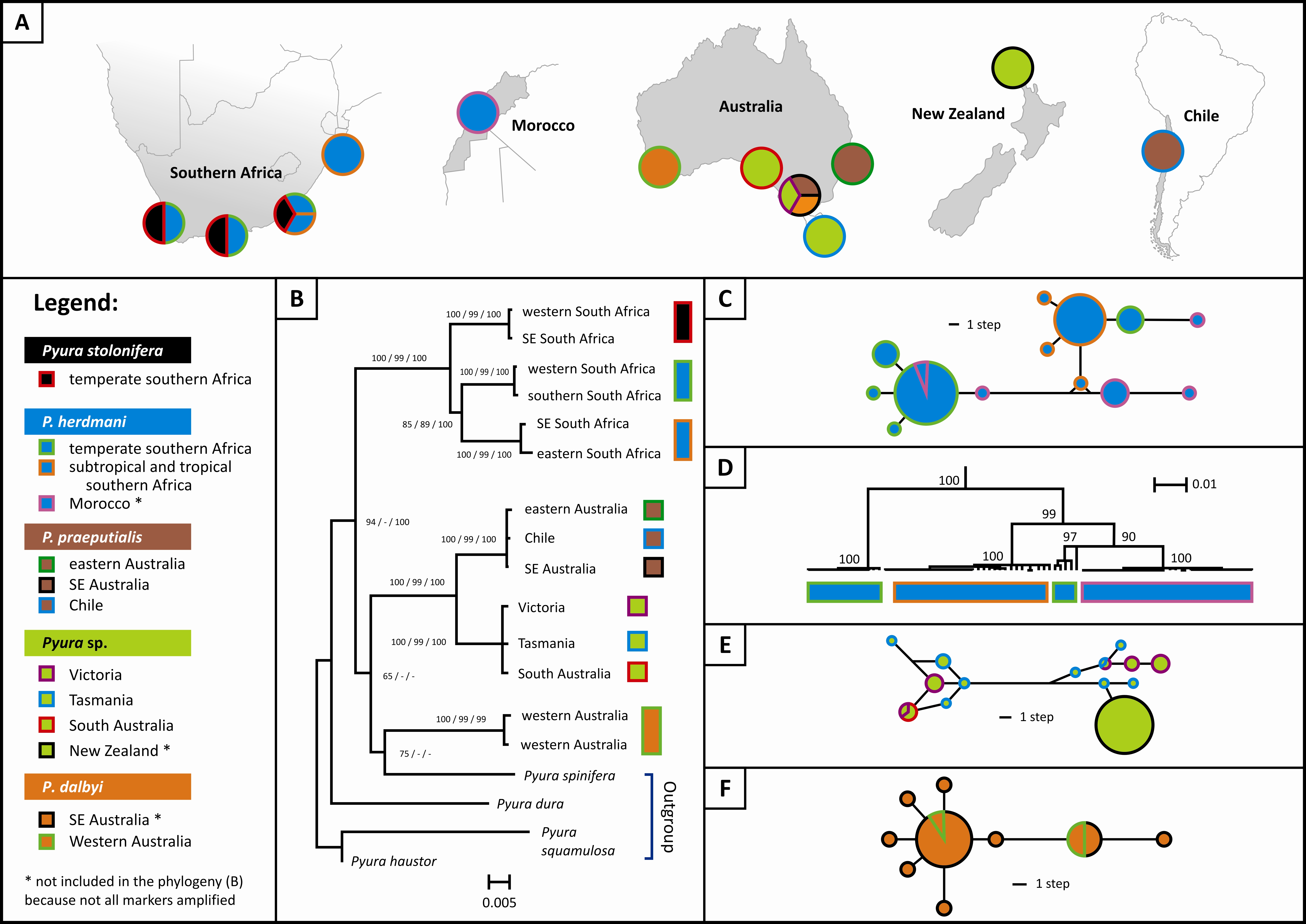
The "Pyura stolonifera species complex"; A: Distributions of the five presently known members of this species complex; B: Phylogenetic tree showing evolutionary relationships; C-D: Intraspecific genetic structure of P. herdmani (C: ANT intron, D: mtDNA COI gene, Pyura sp. (= P. doppelgangera) (E: ANT intron) and P. dalbyi (F: mtDNA COI gene) (Image: Peter Teske)
