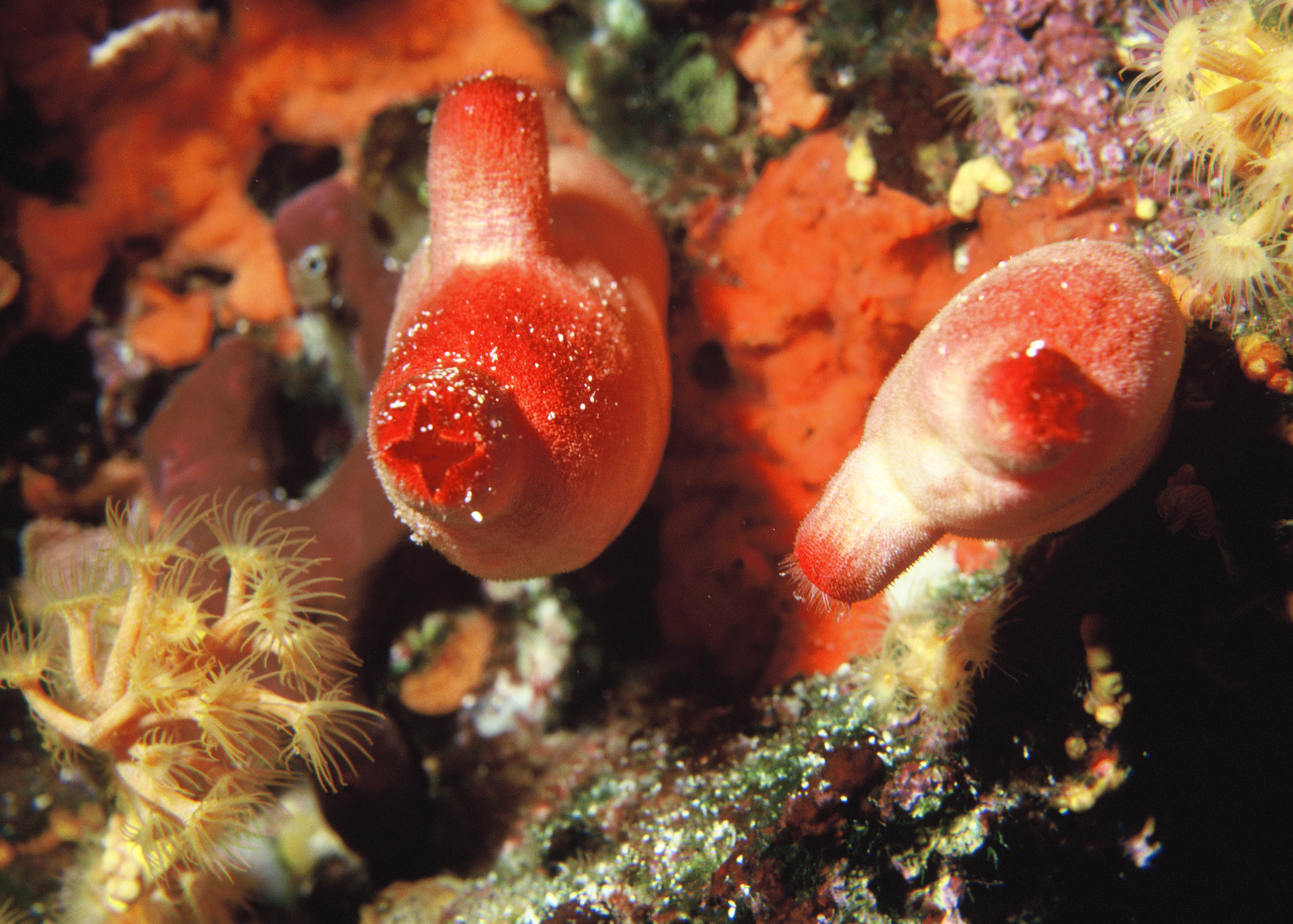

Scientific classification
- Kingdom: Animalia
- Phylum: Chordata
- Subphylum: Tunicata
- Class: Ascidiacea
- Order: Stolidobranchia
- Family: Pyuridae
- Genus: Halocynthia; Verrill, 1879

Species
- see text

= Halocynthia =

Genus of sea squirts

Halocynthia is a genus of ascidian tunicates in the family Pyuridae. Species such as H. roretzi are eaten in parts of Asia as a delicacy.

Species within the genus Halocynthia include:

- Halocynthia aurantium (Pallas, 1787)
- Halocynthia breviramosa Sluiter, 1904
- Halocynthia cactus (Oka, 1932)
- Halocynthia dumosa (Stimpson, 1855)
- Halocynthia hilgendorfi (Traustedt, 1885)
- Halocynthia igaboja Oka, 1906
- Halocynthia igaguri Tokioka, 1953
- Halocynthia microspinosa (Van Name, 1921)
- Halocynthia okai Ritter, 1907
- Halocynthia papillosa (Linnaeus, 1767)
- Halocynthia pyriformis (Rathke, 1806)
- Halocynthia roretzi (Drasche, 1884)
- Halocynthia simaensis Tokioka, 1949
- Halocynthia spinosa Sluiter, 1905
- Halocynthia turboga (Oka, 1929)

Species names currently considered to be synonyms:

- Halocynthia arabica Monniot, 1965: synonym of Halocynthia spinosa Sluiter, 1905
- Halocynthia arctica (Hartmeyer, 1899): synonym of Boltenia echinata (Linnaeus, 1767)
- Halocynthia carnleyensis Bovien, 1921: synonym of Pyura trita (Sluiter, 1900)
- Halocynthia castaneiformis (Drasche, 1884): synonym of Boltenia villosa (Stimpson, 1864)
- Halocynthia cerebriformis (Herdman, 1881): synonym of Pyura spinosa (Quoy & Gaimard, 1834)
- Halocynthia chilensis (Molina, 1782): synonym of Pyura chilensis Molina, 1782
- Halocynthia comma Hartmeyer, 1906: synonym of Pyura comma (Hartmeyer, 1906)
- Halocynthia deani (Ritter, 1900): synonym of Halocynthia aurantium (Pallas, 1787)
- Halocynthia defectiva Millar, 1962: synonym of Halocynthia spinosa Sluiter, 1905
- Halocynthia discoveryi Herdman, 1910: synonym of Pyura discoveryi (Herdman, 1910)
- Halocynthia echinata (Linnaeus, 1767): synonym of Boltenia echinata (Linnaeus, 1767)
- Halocynthia gangelion (Savigny, 1816): synonym of Pyura gangelion (Savigny, 1816)
- Halocynthia grandis (Heller, 1878): synonym of Herdmania grandis (Heller, 1878)
- Halocynthia haustor (Stimpson, 1864): synonym of Pyura haustor (Stimpson, 1864)
- Halocynthia hispida (Herdman, 1881): synonym of Halocynthia dumosa (Stimpson, 1855)
- Halocynthia hystrix Oka, 1930: synonym of Pyura sacciformis (Drasche, 1884)
- Halocynthia jacatrensis (Sluiter, 1890): synonym of Pyura arenosa (Herdman, 1882)
- Halocynthia jakoboja Oka, 1906: synonym of Halocynthia igaboja Oka, 1906
- Halocynthia johnsoni Ritter, 1909: synonym of Pyura haustor (Stimpson, 1864)
- Halocynthia jokoboja Oka, 1906: synonym of Pyura sacciformis (Drasche, 1884)
- Halocynthia karasboja Oka, 1906: synonym of Pyura vittata (Stimpson, 1852)
- Halocynthia michaelseni Oka, 1906: synonym of Pyura sacciformis (Drasche, 1884)
- Halocynthia mirabilis (Drasche, 1884): synonym of Herdmania mirabilis (Drasche, 1884)
- Halocynthia momus (Savigny, 1816): synonym of Herdmania momus (Savigny, 1816)
- Halocynthia owstoni Oka, 1906: synonym of Halocynthia igaboja Oka, 1906
- Halocynthia paessleri (Michaelsen, 1900): synonym of Pyura paessleri (Michaelsen, 1900)
- Halocynthia pallida (Heller, 1878): synonym of Herdmania pallida (Heller, 1878)
- Halocynthia partita (Stimpson, 1852): synonym of Styela canopus (Savigny, 1816)
- Halocynthia polycarpa Sluiter, 1904: synonym of Pyura polycarpa (Sluiter, 1904)
- Halocynthia pulchella (Verrill, 1871): synonym of Dendrodoa pulchella (Rathke, 1806)
- Halocynthia riiseana (Traustedt, 1883): synonym of Pyura vittata (Stimpson, 1852)
- Halocynthia ritteri (Oka, 1906): synonym of Halocynthia igaboja Oka, 1906
- Halocynthia rustica (Linnaeus, 1767): synonym of Styela rustica Linnaeus, 1767
- Halocynthia sanderi (Traustedt & Weltner, 1894): synonym of Pyura sacciformis (Drasche, 1884)
- Halocynthia setosa Sluiter, 1905: synonym of Pyura setosa (Sluiter, 1905)
- Halocynthia stubenrauchi (Michaelsen, 1900): synonym of Pyura stubenrauchi (Michaelsen, 1900)
- Halocynthia superba (Ritter, 1900): synonym of Halocynthia aurantium (Pallas, 1787)
- Halocynthia transversaria Sluiter, 1904: synonym of Boltenia transversaria (Sluiter, 1904)
- Halocynthia tuberculum Verrill, 1879: synonym of Styela coriacea (Alder & Hancock, 1848)
- Halocynthia vanhaffeni Michaelsen, 1904: synonym of Pyura stolonifera (Heller, 1878)
- Halocynthia vanhoeffeni Michaelsen, 1904: synonym of Pyura stolonifera (Heller, 1878)
- Halocynthia vanhoffeni Michaelsen, 1904: synonym of Pyura stolonifera (Heller, 1878)
- Halocynthia villosa (Stimpson, 1864): synonym of Boltenia villosa (Stimpson, 1864)
- Halocynthia washingtonia Ritter, 1913: synonym of Pyura haustor (Stimpson, 1864)
