= Bristly tunicate =

Bristly tunicate is a common name for several tunicates and may refer to:

- Boltenia villosa
- Halocynthia igaboja
