= Demetra+ =

Seasonal adjustment tool

JDemetra+

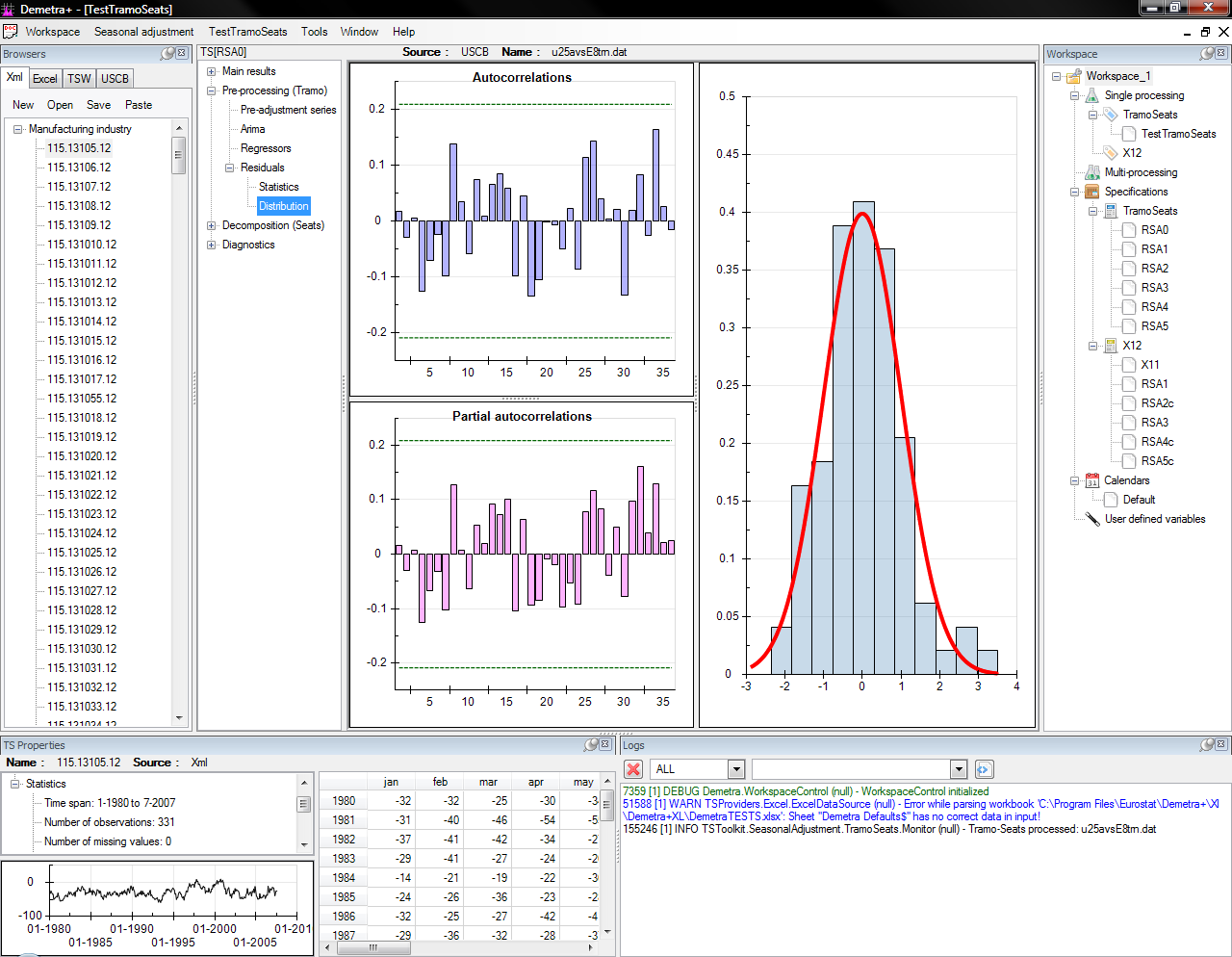
- Demetra+ application
- Developer: Eurostat
- Stable release: 3.9.0 / September 14, 2026; 9 days ago
- Written in: C++, Java
- Operating system: Microsoft Windows
- Available in: English
- License: EUPL
- Website: cros.ec.europa.eu/dashboard/centre-excellence-tsa-sa-services-tools-software-jdemetra
- Repository: github.com/jdemetra/jdplus-main

JDemetra+ is a computer program for seasonal adjustments that was developed by the National Bank of Belgium in collaboration with the Deutsche Bundesbank, Insee and Eurostat – European Commission in accordance with the ESS Guidelines on seasonal adjustment. It supports TRAMO&SEATS and X-12-ARIMA methods of adjustment.

== Development ==
=== Governance ===
The Demetra+ project is governed by the Eurostat. Unlike other software development carried out under an open source license, the Demetra+ project was not initiated by a community or a single developer, but started as an extension to the active role played by Eurostat (and in particular SA Steering Group) in the promotion, development and maintenance of a statistical analysis software system. The SA Steering Group, which consists of Eurostat-ECB high level group of experts from NSIs and NCBs, had been promoting for several years the development of freely available Demetra for seasonal adjustment to be used within ESS. The SA Steering Group is responsible also for facilitating collaboration between separate organizations interested in development of SA tools and has ultimate control over the whole project. Although the software itself will be made available under an open source license, participation in development is contingent upon the decision of Steering Group. The development of the software has been outsourced to the Department of Statistics of the National Bank of Belgium (NBB). In addition, the User Testing Group has been set up, with main tasks to supervise the implementation of the guidelines and user requirements. The User Testing Group is also responsible for issuing recommendations for new requirements and making decisions on adoption or rejection of new requirements not in line with the project guidelines. The Demetra+ community has been established on OSOR environment for reporting and exchange of experience between the members of the User Testing Group itself, as well as for communication with the development team in NBB.

=== Extensions ===
The Demetra+ allows developers to write implementation for:

- time series providers and browsers,
- repository for the definitions of SA processing,
- storage (or further processing) of the results,
- diagnostics on the SA estimations,
- summary (reporting) of a complete SA processing,
- data formatting (drag/drop and copy/paste).

== Features ==
The technology (Object Oriented components) underlying the toolkit has proved to be for managing the complexity of seasonal adjustment algorithms and integrating the major well-known SA engines provided by the Bank of Spain and USCB. In addition, it could easily be embedded in many different environments allowing fast developments and extensions. In parallel with the adoption of the ESS guidelines on SA, the SASG has launched a task force on the SA tools users\' requirements (February - April 2008) in order to define the functional and non functional requirements for a new SA tool DEMETRA+. The role of this community is the common sharing and testing of the new tool DEMETRA+ developed by BNB.

=== Description of menu’s buttons and their functionality ===
In Workspace menu from the Main menu the user can create new Workspaces, open an existing project in a new window, save the file, activates and deactivates the panels, open workspace recently saved and closes an open project. Tools menu is divided into three parts: Container for displaying data; Tool Window for charts and data transformation; Options for diagnostic and output options that can be set by user. Window menu offers the following functions: Floating, Tabbed, Tile vertically and Tile horizontally for the type of arrange all windows; Skinning for graphical appearance of Demetra+ and Documents options which offers some additional options for organising windows.

=== Description workspace layout ===
The key parts of the Demetra+ are:

1. the browsers panel, which presents the available time series;
2. the workspace panel, which shows information used or generated by the software;
3. a central blank zone that will contain actual analyses;
4. two auxiliary panels at the bottom of the application: TSProperties contains the current time series (from the browsers’ panel) and Logs contains logging information.

== Availability and system requirements ==
The software, being cross-platform, runs under the Microsoft Windows, macOS, and Linux (x64 and ARM architectures) operating systems, and is available for download.

== Licensing ==
European Union Public License (EUPL) The EUPL is the first European Free/Open Source Software (F/OSS) licence. It has been created on the initiative of the European Commission. Following an intensive preparatory process and a public consultation, it was approved by the European Commission on 9 January 2007. The EUPL is available in 22 official languages of the European Union, all with identical legal value. 1).

== Notes and references ==
- Introduction to the EUPL licence -
- X12 specifications -
- Demetra+ extensions -
- Development governance -

== Interface to the software ==
JDemetra+ has also an R interface developed in the package RJDemetra. It can be downloaded from its GitHub page: https://github.com/jdemetra/rjdemetra
