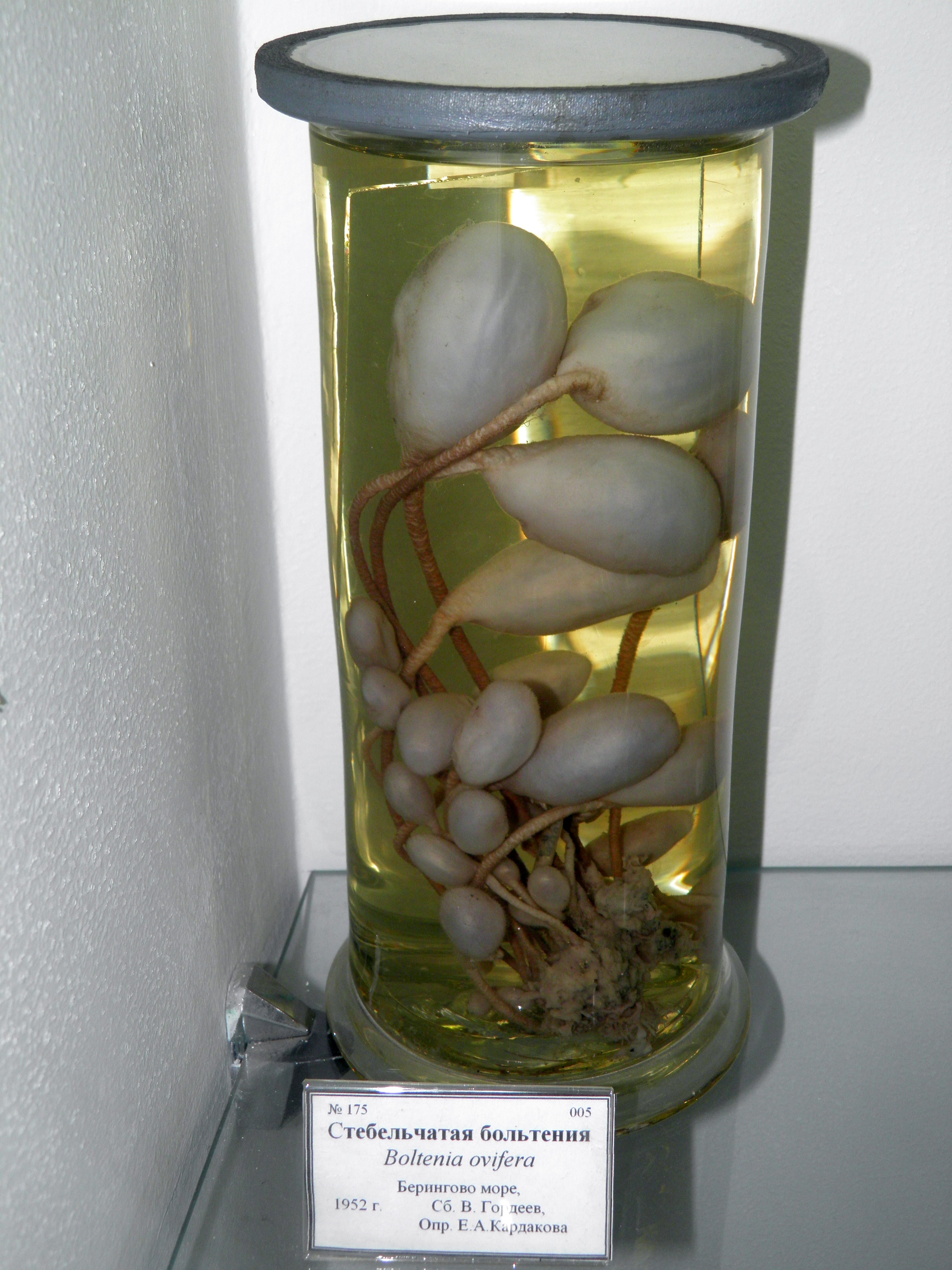
- Boltenia ovifera

Scientific classification
- Kingdom: Animalia
- Phylum: Chordata
- Subphylum: Tunicata
- Class: Ascidiacea
- Order: Stolidobranchia
- Family: Pyuridae
- Genus: Boltenia; Savigny, 1816

Species
- See text

= Boltenia =

Genus of sea squirts

Boltenia is a genus of ascidian tunicates in the family Pyuridae.

Species within the genus Boltenia include:

- Boltenia africana Millar, 1962
- Boltenia echinata (Linnaeus, 1767)
- Boltenia hirta Monniot & Monniot, 1977
- Boltenia iburi (Oka, 1934)
- Boltenia ovifera (Linnaeus, 1767)
- Boltenia pilosa (Millar, 1955)
- Boltenia polyplacoderma Lambert, 1993
- Boltenia transversaria (Sluiter, 1904)
- Boltenia villosa (Stimpson, 1864)
- Boltenia yossiloya Shenkar & Lambert, 2010

Species names currently considered to be synonyms:

- Boltenia antarctica Beneden & Selys-Longchamps, 1913: synonym of Pyura georgiana (Michaelsen, 1898)
- Boltenia arctica (Hartmeyer, 1899): synonym of Boltenia echinata (Linnaeus, 1767)
- Boltenia australiensis Carter, 1885: synonym of Pyura spinifera (Quoy & Gaimard, 1834)
- Boltenia australis Quoy & Gaimard, 1834: synonym of Pyura australis (Quoy & Gaimard, 1834)
- Boltenia beringi Dall, 1872: synonym of Boltenia ovifera (Linnaeus, 1767)
- Boltenia beringia Dall, 1872: synonym of Boltenia ovifera (Linnaeus, 1767)
- Boltenia bolteni (Linnaeus, 1771): synonym of Boltenia ovifera (Linnaeus, 1767)
- Boltenia bouvetensis Michaelsen, 1904: synonym of Pyura bouvetensis (Michaelsen, 1904)
- Boltenia burkhardti Binney, 1870: synonym of Boltenia ovifera (Linnaeus, 1767)
- Boltenia carnea : synonym of Pyura carnea Brewin, 1948
- Boltenia ciliata Moeller, 1842: synonym of Boltenia ovifera (Linnaeus, 1767)
- Boltenia clavata Mueller, 1776: synonym of Boltenia ovifera (Linnaeus, 1767)
- Boltenia coacta Gould, 1852: synonym of Pyura legumen (Lesson, 1830)
- Boltenia coarcta Gould, 1852: synonym of Pyura legumen (Lesson, 1830)
- Boltenia elegans Herdman, 1881: synonym of Boltenia ovifera (Linnaeus, 1767)
- Boltenia fusiformis Savigny, 1816: synonym of Boltenia ovifera (Linnaeus, 1767)
- Boltenia georgiana Michaelsen, 1898: synonym of Pyura georgiana (Michaelsen, 1898)
- Boltenia gibbosa (Heller, 1878): synonym of Pyura gibbosa (Heller, 1878)
- Boltenia hirsuta (Agassiz, 1850): synonym of Boltenia echinata (Linnaeus, 1767)
- Boltenia legumen Lesson, 1830: synonym of Pyura legumen (Lesson, 1830)
- Boltenia microcosmus Agassiz, 1850: synonym of Boltenia ovifera (Linnaeus, 1767)
- Boltenia oviformis (Linnaeus, 1767): synonym of Boltenia ovifera (Linnaeus, 1767)
- Boltenia pachydermatina Herdman, 1881: synonym of Pyura pachydermatina (Herdman, 1881)
- Boltenia pedunculata Hutton, 1873: synonym of Pyura pachydermatina (Herdman, 1881)
- Boltenia reniformis MacLeay, 1825: synonym of Boltenia ovifera (Linnaeus, 1767)
- Boltenia rubra Stimpson, 1852: synonym of Boltenia ovifera (Linnaeus, 1767)
- Boltenia salebrosa Sluiter, 1905: synonym of Pyura bouvetensis (Michaelsen, 1904)
- Boltenia scotti Herdman, 1910: synonym of Pyura bouvetensis (Michaelsen, 1904)
- Boltenia spinifera (Quoy & Gaimard, 1834): synonym of Pyura spinifera (Quoy & Gaimard, 1834)
- Boltenia spinosa (Quoy & Gaimard, 1834): synonym of Pyura spinifera (Quoy & Gaimard, 1834)
- Boltenia thompsoni Hartmeyer, 1903: synonym of Boltenia ovifera (Linnaeus, 1767)
- Boltenia tuberculata Herdman, 1891: synonym of Pyura spinifera (Quoy & Gaimard, 1834)
- Boltenia turqueti Sluiter, 1905: synonym of Pyura bouvetensis (Michaelsen, 1904)
