= Halocidin =

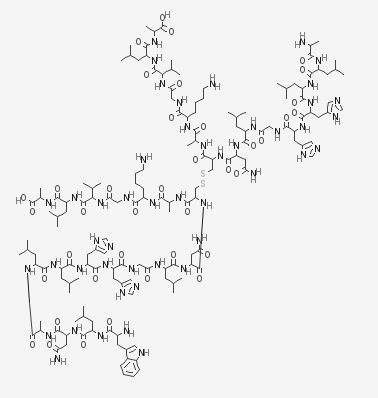

Identifiers
CAS Number	45272204
3D model (JSmol)	Interactive image
ChEMBL	ChEMBL562966
ChemSpider	24627650
PubChem CID	45272204
CompTox Dashboard (EPA)	DTXSID001336379
- InChI: InChI=1S/C155H251N47O38S2/c1-73(2)41-100(181-121(206)63-170-134(217)109(51-91-59-163-69-172-91)190-146(229)111(53-93-61-165-71-174-93)192-144(227)107(48-80(15)16)188-141(224)104(45-77(9)10)185-127(210)84(23)158)139(222)195-114(56-119(161)204)148(231)199-116(150(233)177-85(24)128(211)183-98(37-31-33-39-156)132(215)168-65-123(208)201-125(82(19)20)152(235)197-102(43-75(5)6)136(219)179-88(27)154(237)238)67-241-242-68-117(151(234)178-86(25)129(212)184-99(38-32-34-40-157)133(216)169-66-124(209)202-126(83(21)22)153(236)198-103(44-76(7)8)137(220)180-89(28)155(239)240)200-149(232)115(57-120(162)205)196-140(223)101(42-74(3)4)182-122(207)64-171-135(218)110(52-92-60-164-70-173-92)191-147(230)112(54-94-62-166-72-175-94)193-145(228)108(49-81(17)18)189-142(225)105(46-78(11)12)186-130(213)87(26)176-138(221)113(55-118(160)203)194-143(226)106(47-79(13)14)187-131(214)96(159)50-90-58-167-97-36-30-29-35-95(90)97/h29-30,35-36,58-62,69-89,96,98-117,125-126,167H,31-34,37-57,63-68,156-159H2,1-28H3,(H2,160,203)(H2,161,204)(H2,162,205)(H,163,172)(H,164,173)(H,165,174)(H,166,175)(H,168,215)(H,169,216)(H,170,217)(H,171,218)(H,176,221)(H,177,233)(H,178,234)(H,179,219)(H,180,220)(H,181,206)(H,182,207)(H,183,211)(H,184,212)(H,185,210)(H,186,213)(H,187,214)(H,188,224)(H,189,225)(H,190,229)(H,191,230)(H,192,227)(H,193,228)(H,194,226)(H,195,222)(H,196,223)(H,197,235)(H,198,236)(H,199,231)(H,200,232)(H,201,208)(H,202,209)(H,237,238)(H,239,240) Key: VOWRCIUWDITXFQ-UHFFFAOYSA-N
- SMILES: CC(C)CC(C(=O)NC(CC(=O)N)C(=O)NC(CSSCC(C(=O)NC(C)C(=O)NC(CCCCN)C(=O)NCC(=O)NC(C(C)C)C(=O)NC(CC(C)C)C(=O)NC(C)C(=O)O)NC(=O)C(CC(=O)N)NC(=O)C(CC(C)C)NC(=O)CNC(=O)C(CC1=CN=CN1)NC(=O)C(CC2=CN=CN2)NC(=O)C(CC(C)C)NC(=O)C(CC(C)C)NC(=O)C(C)NC(=O)C(CC(=O)N)NC(=O)C(CC(C)C)NC(=O)C(CC3=CNC4=CC=CC=C43)N)C(=O)NC(C)C(=O)NC(CCCCN)C(=O)NCC(=O)NC(C(C)C)C(=O)NC(CC(C)C)C(=O)NC(C)C(=O)O)NC(=O)CNC(=O)C(CC5=CN=CN5)NC(=O)C(CC6=CN=CN6)NC(=O)C(CC(C)C)NC(=O)C(CC(C)C)NC(=O)C(C)N
- Except where otherwise noted, data are given for materials in their standard state (at 25 °C [77 °F], 100 kPa). Infobox references

Halocidin is an antimicrobial peptide isolated from the Halocynthia aurantium species of tunicate. In mouse models, derivative peptides have shown efficacy in the treatment of fungicidal resistant Candida Albacans when used as a mouthwash additive.
