= Spermosin =

Identifiers
- EC no.: 3.4.21.99
- CAS no.: 89925-67-7

Databases
- IntEnz: IntEnz view
- BRENDA: BRENDA entry
- ExPASy: NiceZyme view
- KEGG: KEGG entry
- MetaCyc: metabolic pathway
- PRIAM: profile
- PDB structures: RCSB PDB PDBe PDBsum
Search
- PMC: articles
- PubMed: articles
- NCBI: proteins

Spermosin (EC 3.4.21.99) is an enzyme. This enzyme catalyses the following chemical reaction

Hydrolyses arginyl bonds, preferably with Pro in the P2 position

This enzyme is isolated from the ascidian (Prochordate) Halocynthia roretzi.
