= Water year =

12-month time period used in hydrology

A water year (also called hydrological year, discharge year or flow year) is a term commonly used in hydrology to describe a time period of 12 months for which precipitation totals are measured. Its beginning differs from the calendar year because part of the precipitation that falls in late autumn and winter accumulates as snow and does not drain until the following spring or summer's snowmelt. The goal is to ensure that as much as possible of the surface runoff during the water year is attributable to the precipitation during the same water year.

Due to meteorological and geographical factors, the definition of the water years varies. The United States Geological Survey (USGS) defines it as the period between October 1 of one year and September 30 of the next, as late September to early October is the time for many drainage areas in the US to have the lowest stream flow and consistent ground water levels. The water year is designated by the calendar year in which it ends; for example, the 2026 US water year runs from October 1, 2025 through September 30, 2026.

One way to identify a water-year is to find the successive 12-month period that most consistently, year after year, gives the highest correlation between precipitation and streamflow and negligible changes in storage (i.e., soil water and snow). Usually, the time when the variation of storage from year to year is the smallest is the time with the minimum storage level and minimum flow. However, the practical considerations also affect the water year definitions. For example, in Canada the water year starts in October, apparently to coincide with the US one, although better measurement conditions exist in winter.

To accommodate the regional and climatic variations, some researchers use a per-gauge local water year that starts in the month with the lowest average streamflow.

== Classification ==
Water year types (or indices) are used to present the historical hydrological data in a simplified form. These indices help to categorize similar water years for the planning of the rule-based water operations. A typical set includes: very dry year, dry year, normal year, wet year, very wet year. The years are characterized through setting numerical thresholds for the water runoff in the water year. The methods of calculation (and the set of types) naturally vary by the region, therefore many indices exists, for example:

- Palmer Drought Severity Index (PDSI). Proposed by W. C. Palmer in 1965, PDSI is extensively used in the US since then;
- Standardized Precipitation Index (SPI) was proposed by McKee et al. in 1993;
- Reclamation Drought Index;
- deciles.

Many practically used indices were created ad-hoc. For example, California River Indices are weighted averages of the estimates of spring melt, runoff for the rest of the year, and the result for the previous year, calculated for few river basins separately to classify the water year as a wet, above normal, below normal, dry, and critical ("normal" years in California are extremely rare). These California indices were not created "through a systematic statistical analysis of historic basin conditions and river flows".

All indices by nature reflect the historic values and therefore cannot capture the variations in climate that are known to cause the distribution of water year types to be non-stationary in time.

== Uses ==
Examples of how water year is used:

- Used to compare precipitation from one water year to another.
- Used to define a period of examination for hydrologic modeling purposes.
- Used in reports by the United States Geological Survey (USGS) as a term that deals with surface-water supply.
- The end of the water year is used by the CoCoRaHS project as an opportunity for observers to audit and verify data for their site.

== See also ==
- Seasonal year

== Sources ==
- Null, Sarah E.; Viers, Joshua H. (February 2013). "In bad waters: Water year classification in nonstationary climates". Water Resources Research. 49 (2): 1137–1148. Bibcode:2013WRR....49.1137N. doi:10.1002/wrcr.20097. ISSN 0043-1397.
- WEAP (2015). WEAP User Guide (PDF). Somerville, MA: Stockholm Environment Institute, U.S. Center.
- Alley, W. M. (1984). "The Palmer Drought Severity Index: Limitations and Assumptions". Journal of Applied Meteorology and Climatology. 23 (7): 1100–1109. Bibcode:1984JApMe..23.1100A. doi:10.1175/1520-0450(1984)023<1100:TPDSIL>2.0.CO;2.
- Viers, Joshua H. (30 March 2011). "Hydropower Relicensing and Climate Change" (PDF). JAWRA Journal of the American Water Resources Association. 47 (4): 655–661. Bibcode:2011JAWRA..47..655V. doi:10.1111/j.1752-1688.2011.00531.x. ISSN 1093-474X. S2CID 3065925. Archived from the original (PDF) on 7 August 2022.
- Duncan, Craig (1955). The Saskatchewan river basin, Canada: a geographical appraisal of the water resources (PhD). Ohio State University.
- Johnstone, Don; Cross, William Perry (1949). "The Water Year". Elements of Applied Hydrology. Ronald Press Company. pp. 102–103. OCLC 1150788749.
