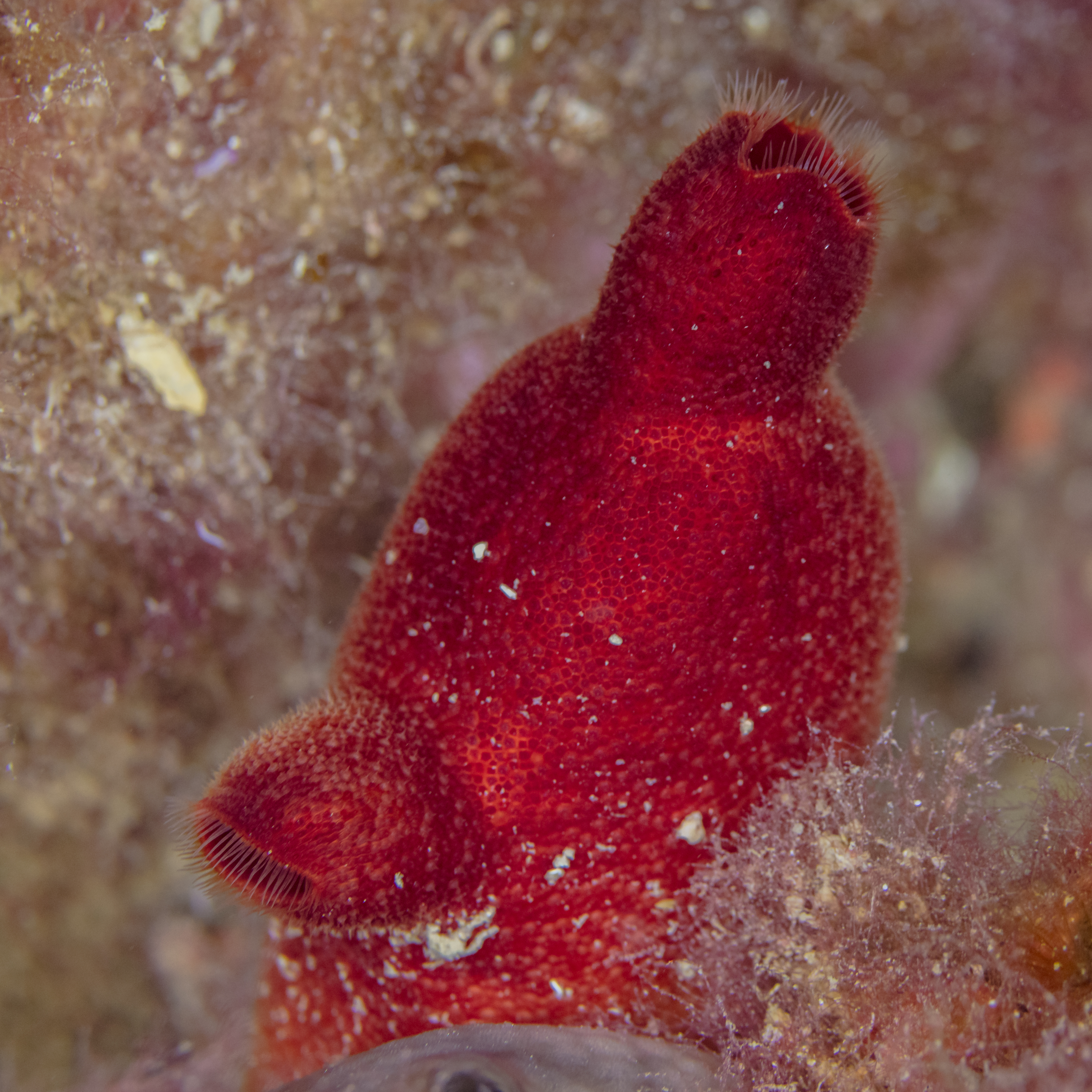

Scientific classification
- Kingdom: Animalia
- Phylum: Chordata
- Subphylum: Tunicata
- Class: Ascidiacea
- Order: Stolidobranchia
- Family: Pyuridae
- Genus: Halocynthia
- Species: H. papillosa

Binomial name
- Halocynthia papillosa (Gunnerus, 1765)

= Halocynthia papillosa =

Species of sea squirt

The Halocythnia papillosa, which is also known as the red sea squirt, is a tunicate that is commonly found in the Mediterranean Sea, but is also found in the northeastern Atlantic Ocean and western Pacific Ocean. It is a benthic species that uses suspension feeding, it is known for its bright red to orange coloration on the rough and bumpy exterior.

== Taxonomy ==
The species was first described by Johan Ernst Gunnerus, which would later become the accepted name by Carl Linnaeus in 1767.

The scientific name is derived from the Greek word Halos, meaning “sea”, and the Greek word Cynthia, a name deriving from “From Mount Cynthus”. The Latin word papilla, meaning “nipple”, and the osa, is a suffix for “plenty”. Referring to its bumpy texture.

== Description ==
Halocynthia papillosa is described to have a sac-like body, with a tunic which contains cellulose-protein fibrils contributing to the rigid structure of the organism. As reflective of the name of the organism, the texture of the rough outer body is bumpy. It commonly attaches to substrates that are more rocky in nature. The organism has two siphons, an oral for intake and the atrial is for expulsion. The coloration can range from a deep red to orange, and its size will vary significantly depending on habitat and depth. However, it will typically be around 10 cm in height but can extend to 20 cm in certain conditions. It will contract when disturbed which will affect sizing.

== Distribution ==
This organism can be found in the Mediterranean Sea primarily but can also be as widespread as the northeastern Atlantic, including the coasts of Portugal and the Canary Islands. It can also be found in the west Pacific Ocean, along the east coast of Australia^{[}, and New Zealand, as well as the coasts of China, North Korea, South Korea, and Japan. This species will commonly inhabit rocky benthic substrates at varying depths, ranging from 2 m to over 100 m.

Growth and distribution of H. papillosa is affected by the abiotic factors: temperature, salinity, and hydrodynamic conditions. It will coexist with other sessile invertebrates, increasing the biodiversity of benthic systems, this includes in areas with high hydrothermal activity such as in the Aegean Sea.

== Feeding ==
Halocynthia papillosa is a suspension feeder, they filter organic particles and planktons from the water column surrounding the organism. Using its oral siphon to take in water and food, capturing what it requires then expelling the rest through its atrial siphon. Feeding rates will vary seasonally with more activity during colder months.

== Reproduction ==
The ascidian class is primarily hermaphrodites, exhibiting seasonal reproductive cycles like other organisms, with gamete release and larval development largely controlled by the temperature and photoperiod.

== Physiology ==
The tunics of Halocynthia papillosa are rich in cellulose, similar to what are found in plants. They have complex helicoidal and supramolecular architecture of the cellulose-protein fibrils. The tunic’s formation requires heavy polysaccharide production and structural reorganization.

== External resources ==
- Photos of Halocynthia papillosa in the Sealife Collection
