= Seasonal adjustment =

Statistical technique

Seasonal adjustment or deseasonalization is a statistical method for removing the seasonal component of a time series. It is usually done when wanting to analyse the trend, and cyclical deviations from trend, of a time series independently of the seasonal components. Many economic phenomena have seasonal cycles, such as agricultural production, (crop yields fluctuate with the seasons) and consumer consumption (increased personal spending leading up to Christmas). It is necessary to adjust for this component in order to understand underlying trends in the economy, so official statistics are often adjusted to remove seasonal components. Typically, seasonally adjusted data is reported for unemployment rates to reveal the underlying trends and cycles in labor markets.

== Time series components ==
The investigation of many economic time series becomes problematic due to seasonal fluctuations. Time series are made up of four components:

- $S_t$: The seasonal component
- $T_t$: The trend component
- $C_t$: The cyclical component
- $E_t$: The error, or irregular component.

The difference between seasonal and cyclic patterns:

- Seasonal patterns have a fixed and known length, while cyclic patterns have variable and unknown length.
- Cyclic pattern exists when data exhibit rises and falls that are not of fixed period (duration usually of at least 2 years).
- The average length of a cycle is usually longer than that of seasonality.
- The magnitude of cyclic variation is usually more variable than that of seasonal variation.

The relation between decomposition of time series components

- Additive decomposition: $Y_t = S_t + T_t + C_t + E_t$, where $Y_t$ is the data at time $t$.
- Multiplicative decomposition: $Y_t = S_t \cdot T_t \cdot C_t \cdot E_t$.
- Logs turn multiplicative relationship into an additive relationship: $Y_t = S_t \cdot T_t \cdot C_t \cdot E_t \rightarrow \log Y_t = \log S_t + \log T_t + \log C_t + \log E_t$:
- An additive model is appropriate if the magnitude of seasonal fluctuations does not vary with level.
- If seasonal fluctuations are proportional to the level of the series, then a multiplicative model is appropriate. Multiplicative decomposition is more prevalent with economic series.

== Adjustment methods ==
Unlike the trend and cyclical components, seasonal components, theoretically, happen with similar magnitude during the same time period each year. The seasonal components of a series are sometimes considered to be uninteresting and to hinder the interpretation of a series. Removing the seasonal component directs focus on other components and will allow better analysis.

Different statistical research groups have developed different methods of seasonal adjustment, for example X-13-ARIMA and X-12-ARIMA developed by the United States Census Bureau; TRAMO/SEATS developed by the Bank of Spain; MoveReg (for weekly data) developed by the United States Bureau of Labor Statistics; STAMP developed by a group led by S. J. Koopman; and “Seasonal and Trend decomposition using Loess” (STL) developed by Cleveland et al. (1990). While X-12/13-ARIMA can only be applied to monthly or quarterly data, STL decomposition can be used on data with any type of seasonality. Furthermore, unlike X-12-ARIMA, STL allows the user to control the degree of smoothness of the trend cycle and how much the seasonal component changes over time. X-12-ARIMA can handle both additive and multiplicative decomposition whereas STL can only be used for additive decomposition. In order to achieve a multiplicative decomposition using STL, the user can take the log of the data before decomposing, and then back-transform after the decomposition.

=== Software ===
Each group provides software supporting their methods. Some versions are also included as parts of larger products, and some are commercially available. For example, SAS includes X-12-ARIMA, while Oxmetrics includes STAMP. A recent move by public organisations to harmonise seasonal adjustment practices has resulted in the development of Demetra+ by Eurostat and National Bank of Belgium which currently includes both X-12-ARIMA and TRAMO/SEATS. R includes STL decomposition. The X-12-ARIMA method can be utilized via the R package "X12". EViews supports X-12, X-13, Tramo/Seats, STL and MoveReg.

== Example ==
One well-known example is the rate of unemployment, which is represented by a time series. This rate depends particularly on seasonal influences, which is why it is important to free the unemployment rate of its seasonal component. Such seasonal influences can be due to school graduates or dropouts looking to enter into the workforce and regular fluctuations during holiday periods. Once the seasonal influence is removed from this time series, the unemployment rate data can be meaningfully compared across different months and predictions for the future can be made.

When seasonal adjustment is not performed with monthly data, year-on-year changes are utilised in an attempt to avoid contamination with seasonality.

== Indirect seasonal adjustment ==
When time series data has seasonality removed from it, it is said to be directly seasonally adjusted. If it is made up of a sum or index aggregation of time series which have been seasonally adjusted, it is said to have been indirectly seasonally adjusted. Indirect seasonal adjustment is used for large components of GDP which are made up of many industries, which may have different seasonal patterns and which are therefore analyzed and seasonally adjusted separately. Indirect seasonal adjustment also has the advantage that the aggregate series is the exact sum of the component series. Seasonality can appear in an indirectly adjusted series; this is sometimes called residual seasonality.

== Moves to standardise seasonal adjustment processes ==
Due to the various seasonal adjustment practices by different institutions, a group was created by Eurostat and the European Central Bank to promote standard processes. In 2009 a small group composed of experts from European Union statistical institutions and central banks produced the ESS Guidelines on Seasonal Adjustment, which is being implemented in all the European Union statistical institutions. It is also being adopted voluntarily by other public statistical institutions outside the European Union.

== Use of seasonally adjusted data in regressions ==
By the Frisch–Waugh–Lovell theorem it does not matter whether dummy variables for all but one of the seasons are introduced into the regression equation, or if the independent variable is first seasonally adjusted (by the same dummy variable method), and the regression then run.

Since seasonal adjustment introduces a "non-revertible" moving average (MA) component into time series data, unit root tests (such as the Phillips–Perron test) will be biased towards non-rejection of the unit root null.

== Shortcomings of using seasonally adjusted data ==
Use of seasonally adjusted time series data can be misleading because a seasonally adjusted series contains both the trend-cycle component and the error component. As such, what appear to be "downturns" or "upturns" may actually be randomness in the data. For this reason, if the purpose is finding turning points in a series, using the trend-cycle component is recommended rather than the seasonally adjusted data.

== See also ==
- Ergograph
- List of statistical packages
- Seasonally adjusted annual rate
- Seasonal year
