= Ergograph =

An ergograph is a graph that shows a relation between human activities and a seasonal year. The name was coined by Dr. Arthur Geddes of the University of Edinburgh. It can either be a polar coordinate (circular) or a cartesian coordinate (rectangular) graph, and either a line graph or a bar graph.

In polar form, the months of the year are marked around the circumference, forming 30° sectors. Concentric lines display the value being measured. For example an ergograph could show the proportions of time (in hours per day) devoted to each of certain activities, with a time scale, ranging from 0 to 24 hours per day, along the radius of the circle, as a square root scale. This form of an ergograph is an example of a polar line graph or (because the data form "bands" on the graph) a polar strata graph or polar layer graph, the "polar" denoting the system of polar coordinates used on the graph. In cartesian form, the X axis is marked for the months of the year, and the Y axis is marked with the scale(s) of the activity/activities.

== See also ==
- Seasonal adjustment
