= Warty sea squirt =

Warty sea squirt may refer to:

- Phallusia mammillata, also called white sea squirt
- Styela clava, also called stalked sea squirt
- Pyura haustor, also called wrinkled seapump, wrinkled sea squirt, or warty tunicate
