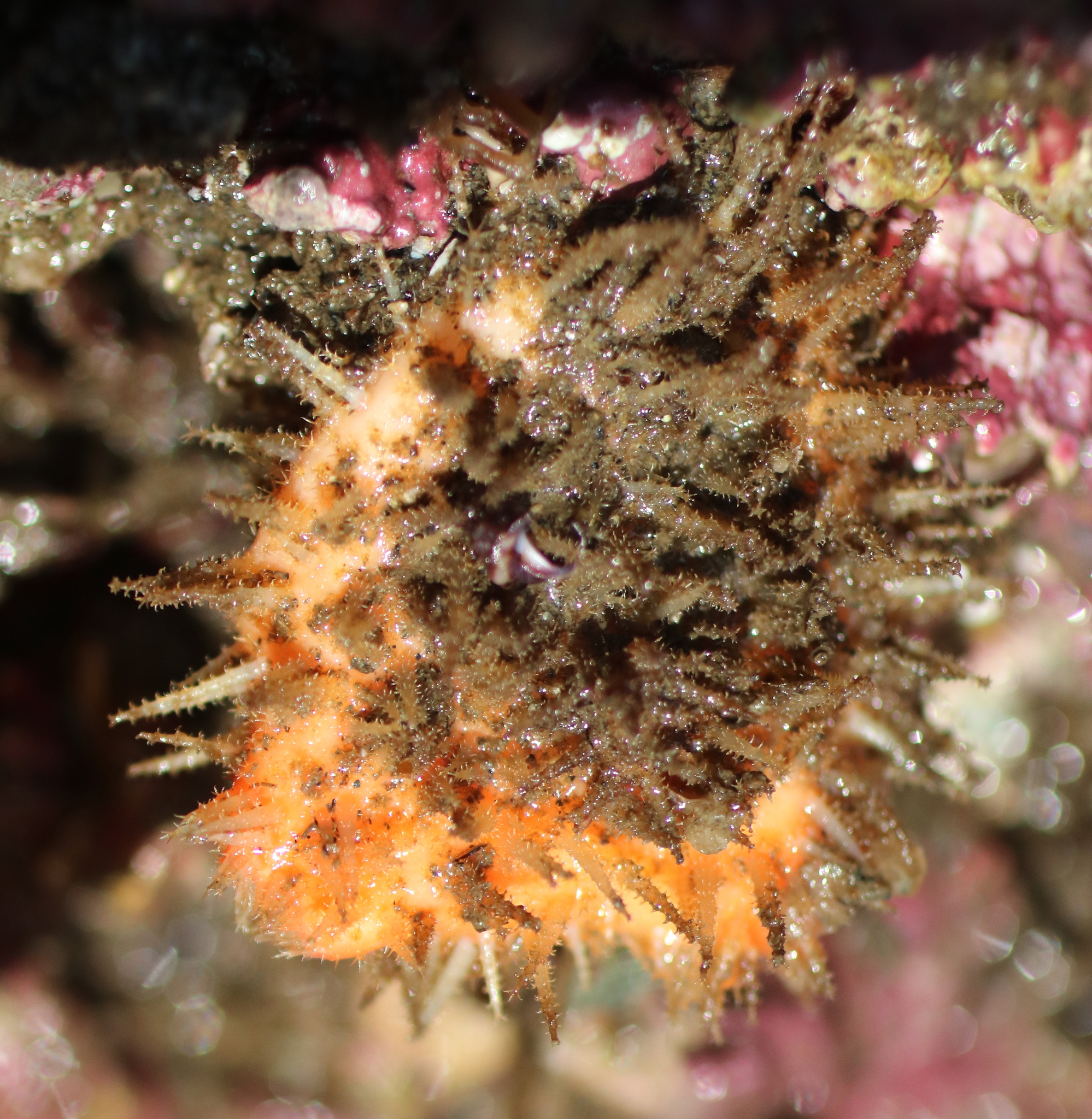

Scientific classification
- Kingdom: Animalia
- Phylum: Chordata
- Subphylum: Tunicata
- Class: Ascidiacea
- Order: Stolidobranchia
- Family: Pyuridae
- Genus: Halocynthia
- Species: H. igaboja

Binomial name
- Halocynthia igaboja Oka, 1906

Synonyms
- Cynthia ritteri Oka, 1906; Halocynthia jakoboja Oka, 1906; Halocynthia owstoni Oka, 1906; Halocynthia ritteri (Oka, 1906); Pyura okai (Ritter, 1907); Tethyum igaboja (Oka, 1906)

= Halocynthia igaboja =

Species of sea squirt

Halocynthia igaboja, commonly known as sea hedgehog, bristly tunicate or spiny sea squirt, is a species of tunicate in the family Pyuridae. It is native to the northeastern Pacific Ocean. This species was first described in 1906 by the Japanese marine biologist Asajiro Oka, who gave it the name Cynthia ritteri. It was later transferred to the genus Halocynthia.

== Description ==
Solitary tunicates like the sea hedgehog have a roughly globular body with a leathery body wall or tunic, and two siphons. The buccal siphon draws water into the body, and the atrial siphon expels water. In this species, the tunic is dark brown but is rendered almost invisible by the numerous large, branching, spine-like processes which cover it. The longest spines bear rings of recurved secondary spines. The siphons are often reddish or orangish in colour; the buccal siphon is at the top of the animal and is surrounded by twelve to fifty tentacles, while the atrial siphon is a third to half of the way down the body. At a maximum height of 10 cm (4 in) and width of 2 to 5 cm (0.8 to 2.0 in), this is one of the largest solitary tunicates in the Pacific Northwest. It could be confused with the cactus sea squirt (Boltenia echinata) but is altogether spinier and larger.

== Distribution and habitat ==
The sea hedgehog is found in Japan, southeastern Asia, and the Pacific Coast of North America, from Alaska to California. It prefers rocky or gravelly habitats with vigorous currents, with a depth range from the intertidal down to about 165 m (540 ft).

== Ecology ==
The sea hedgehog is a suspension feeder, drawing water through its body and filtering out the plankton and organic material. Detritus and diatoms tend to accumulate on the spiny processes when the current is weak, rendering the animal almost invisible. The spines act as a defence against the Oregon hairy triton, a gastropod mollusc. The bristly sea squirt Boltenia villosa, lives in the same habitat but is less spiny; it defends itself by becoming an epibiont and preferentially settling on the spines of the sea hedgehog. This species is a semi-gregarious species and is cannibalistic, consuming its own eggs and larvae.
