= Ascidiaceihabitans =

Scientific classification
- Domain: Bacteria
- Kingdom: Pseudomonadati
- Phylum: Pseudomonadota
- Class: Alphaproteobacteria
- Order: Rhodobacterales
- Family: Rhodobacteraceae
- Genus: Ascidiaceihabitans; Kim et al. 2014

Type species
- Ascidiaceihabitans donghaensis

Species
- A. donghaensis

Genus of bacteria

Ascidiaceihabitans is a Gram-negative and aerobic genus of bacteria from the family of Rhodobacteraceae with one known species (Ascidiaceihabitans donghaensis). Ascidiaceihabitans donghaensis has been isolated from the sea squirt Halocynthia aurantium from the Sea of Japan in Korea.
