= Halocyamine =

Antibiotic peptides

Chemical structures of halocyamine A (top) and halocyamine B (bottom)

Halocyamines are antibiotic peptides isolated from the ascidian Halocynthia roretzi.
