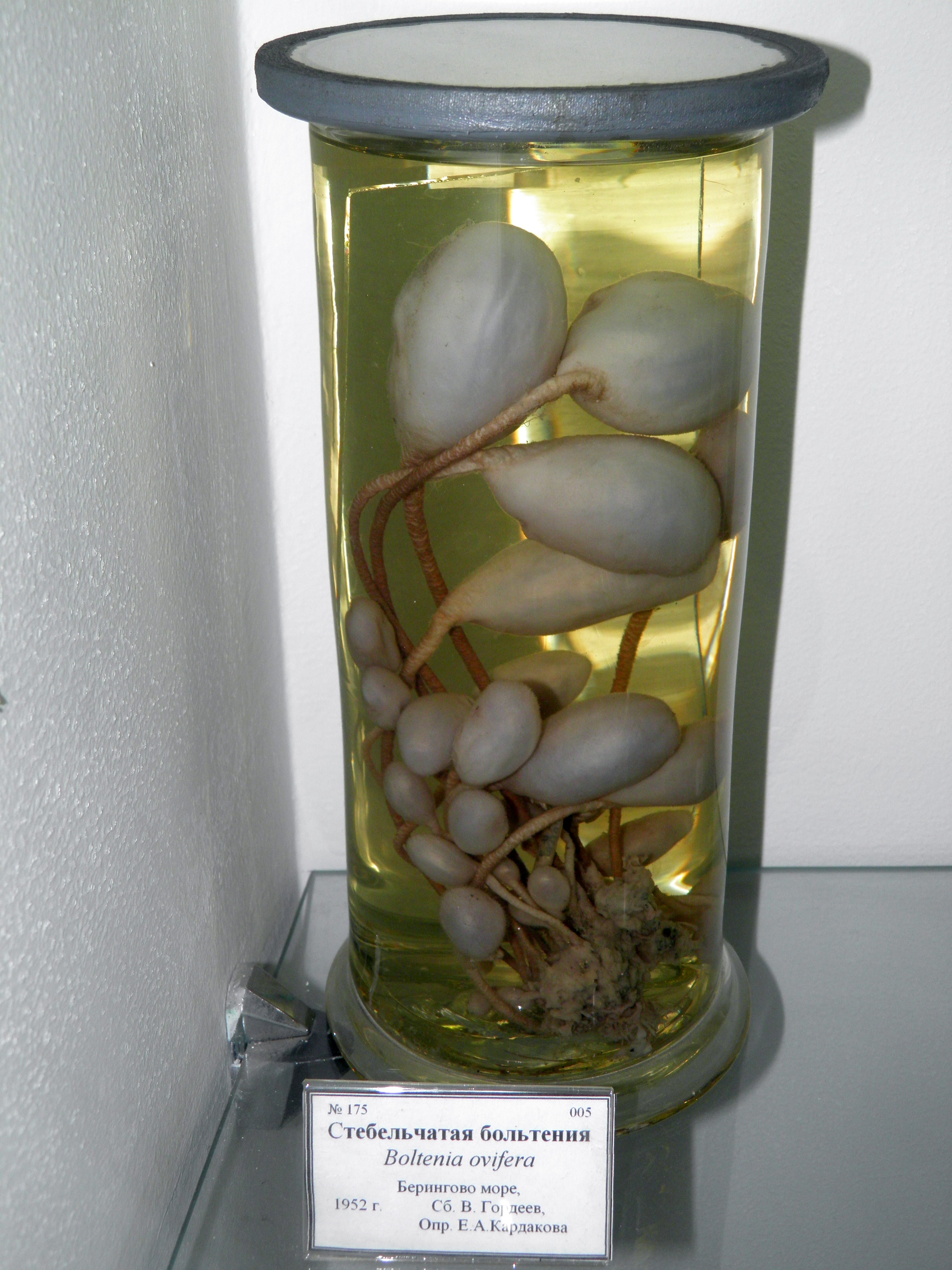

Scientific classification
- Kingdom: Animalia
- Phylum: Chordata
- Subphylum: Tunicata
- Class: Ascidiacea
- Order: Stolidobranchia
- Family: Pyuridae
- Genus: Boltenia
- Species: B. ovifera

Binomial name
- Boltenia ovifera (Linnaeus, 1767)

Synonyms
- Boltenia beringi Dall, 1872; Boltenia beringia Dall, 1872; Boltenia bolteni (Linnaeus, 1771); Boltenia burkhardti Binney, 1870; Boltenia ciliata Moeller, 1842; Boltenia clavata Mueller, 1776; Boltenia elegans Herdman, 1881; Boltenia fusiformis Savigny, 1816; Boltenia microcosmus Agassiz, 1850; Boltenia oviformis (Linnaeus, 1767); Boltenia reniformis MacLeay, 1825; Boltenia rubra Stimpson, 1852; Boltenia thompsoni Hartmeyer, 1903; Vorticella ovifera Linnaeus, 1767

= Boltenia ovifera =

Species of sea squirt

Boltenia ovifera is a species of ascidian tunicate in the family Pyuridae. It is found in the Arctic to the South of Cape Cod. Boltenia ovifera has an average lifespan of 3 years and it can house small invertebrate creatures like the red king crab. They group in long stalks around 20–30 centimetres (7.9–11.8 in), they are found in the ocean on a substrata around 10–300 metres (33–984 ft). Under a microscope it was observed that they have spines on their external surface. Inside the tunic, no real organized cellular system was observed. It was also noted that they have a single layer heart, where each cell had a single microfibril.

Boltenia Ovifera is a functional organism, but its main purpose isn't to survive and reproduce, like most living organisms. Although its ecological role is unclear and poorly understood, Boltenia live to house and protect smaller invertebrate creatures and hang in groups, in stalks on seabeds surrounded by red-algae. This species isn't known to be a complicated organism due to its lack of an organized cellular system which is most likely why it has such a short life span. Although they aren't complicated organisms, it was found that on their exterior, they obtain a spine and a single layer heart (a non-complex heart structure composed of a single cell thick layer of cells that makes up the muscular wall in the heart).

Scientists observed in the areas of sea potatoes, there were anemones and soft corals, which are both "Filter-feeding macroinvertebrates". More profuse people are around the areas of the sea potatoes. The scientist concluded that the sea potatoes were acting as a "biogenic habitat to enhance local species richness in the rocky subtidal zone".

A recent study by Nova Scotia found that 22 species grow on these sea potatoes . The most common animal we find on these potatoes are young cods hiding from their predators. This reaerch could help because this could help scientists discover new animals or even new areas that some creatures can live/hide. With this, we can research potential habitats for new animals that are in danger of losing their homes and can see if these sea potatoes have any habitat or food chain to provide for sea creatures to surve of. (Dive Deeper 2025)
