= Calendar year =

Period of time

Today (at UTC+00)
- Friday, 9 October 2026
Akan	Nwonafie
Armenian	21 Sahmi 1476
Aztec	Izcalli 7, 13 Xōchitl
Babylonian	26 Ululu, 2337 SE
Balinese pawukon	Menga, Beteng, Laba, Wage, Aryang, Sukra of Wayang, Indra, Ogan, Pandita
Bengali	24 Ashshin, BS 1433
Chinese	Yang Fire Dragon・Ghost Mansion; Fire Horse Year, Month 8, Day 29 (Hanlu, 14 days until Shuangjiang)
Common Era	9 October 2026 CE
Coptic	29 Thout, AM 1743
Egyptian	26 Mechir, 2775 NE
Ethiopian	29 Maskaram, 2019 Amätä Məhrät
French Republican	Décade II, Septidi de Vendémiaire de l'Année 235 de la République
Gregorian	9 October, AD 2026
Hebrew	28 Tishrei, AM 5787
Hindu	Uttaraphalgunī・Śukla; Solar: 23 Āśvina, 1948 SE; Lunisolar: Caturdaśī, Kṛishna pakṣa of Bhādrapada, 2083 VE; Rāudra・5127 KY・1,872,857
Icelandic	Föstudagur, 16 Haustmánuður 2026
Islamic	26 Rabi' al-thani, AH 1448 (using tabular method)
ISO week date	2026-W41-5
Japanese	29 Hazuki, Reiwa 8 (Kanro, 14 days until Sōkō)
Julian	26 September, AD 2026 (AM 7534)
Julian day	2461323
Korean	29 Dakdal, 4359 DE
Maya	13.0.14.0.0; 13 Yax, 13 Ahau
Roman	ante diem VI Kalendas Octobres, MMDCCLXXIX AUC
Solar Hijri	17 Mehr, SH 1405
Tibetan	29 khrums, me pho rta 2153 or 1772 or 1000

A calendar year begins on the New Year's Day of the given calendar system and ends on New Year's Eve, and thus consists of a whole number of days. The astronomer's mean tropical year, which is averaged over equinoxes and solstices, is currently 365.24219 days. As this is not an integer, solar calendars have strategies to adjust for the 0.24219 remainder. Neither is it a whole number of lunar months (being about 10 or 11 days more than 12 lunations) so lunisolar calendars also must include adjustments to resynchronise with the seasons. Pure lunar calendars ignore the solar cycle and instead have an invariant year of twelve lunar months that drifts through the seasons.

The Gregorian calendar year, which is in use as civil calendar in most of the world, begins on January 1 and ends on December 31. It has a length of 365 days in an ordinary year but, in order to reconcile the calendar year with the astronomical cycle, it has 366 days in a leap year. With 97 leap years every 400 years, the Gregorian calendar year has an average length of 365.2425 days. The corresponding week year has the same mean year, but just 364 days (i.e. 52 full weeks) in most years and 371 days (53 weeks) in 71 out of 400.

Other formula-based calendars can have lengths which are further out of step with the solar cycle: The Julian calendar (a solar calendar) has an average length of 365.25 days because it has slightly more 366-day years than the Gregorian calendar. The Hebrew calendar (a lunisolar calendar) has an average length of 365.2468 days, but its calendar years are either 12 months for a total of 354 to 355 days or 13 months (384 days) long.

The lunar Hijri calendar ("Islamic calendar") is a true lunar calendar that consists of 12 lunar months in a year of 354 or 355 days and makes no attempt to track the solar year. (Note: Another Islamic calendar, the solar Hijri calendar, runs from spring equinox to spring equinox, has years of 365 or 366 days as they arise and thus has no appreciable errors.)

A year can also be measured by starting on any other named day of the calendar, and ending on the day before this named day in the following year. This may be termed a "year's time" or a "year", but is not a calendar year.

== Parts ==
=== Quarter year ===
The calendar year can be divided into four quarters, often abbreviated as Q1, Q2, Q3, and Q4.

When they are three full months each, they are also called trimesters. In the Gregorian calendar:

1. First quarter, Q1: January – March (90 days or 91 days in leap years)
2. Second quarter, Q2: April – June (91 days)
3. Third quarter, Q3: July – September (92 days)
4. Fourth quarter, Q4: October – December (92 days)

In some domains, weeks are preferred over months for scheduling and reporting, so they use quarters of exactly 13 weeks each, often following ISO week date conventions. One in five to six years has a 53rd week which is usually appended to the last quarter. It is then 98 days instead of 91 days long, which complicates comparisons.

In the Chinese calendar, the quarters are traditionally associated with the 4 seasons of the year:

1. Spring: 1st to 3rd month
2. Summer: 4th to 6th month
3. Autumn: 7th to 9th month
4. Winter: 10th to 12th month

=== Quadrimester ===
The calendar year can also be divided into three quadrimesters (from French quadrimestre), lasting for four months each. They can also be called the early, middle, or late parts of the year. In the Gregorian calendar:

1. First quadrimester, early year: January – April (119 days or 120 days in leap years)
2. Second quadrimester, mid-year: May – August (122 days)
3. Third quadrimester, late year: September – December (121 days)

=== Semester ===
The calendar year can also be divided into two semesters, lasting six months each and sometimes being abbreviated as S1 and S2. In the Gregorian calendar:

- First semester, S1: January – June (181 days or 182 days in leap years)
- Second semester, S2: July – December (184 days)

== See also ==
- Academic term – Subdivision of the academic year at educational institutions
- Bissextus – Leap day (24 February used for two days) (historical usage)
- Calendar reform – Significant revision of a calendar system
- Common year – Calendar year with 365 days
- Fiscal year – One-year term for government and business financial reporting
- Intercalation (timekeeping) – Insertion of a leap day, week, or month
- ISO 8601 – International standards for dates and times
- ISO week date – Leap week calendar system
- Julian date – Days since the beginning of the Julian Period
- Julian year (astronomy) – a time interval of exactly 365.25 Earth days
- Julian year (calendar) – a year in the Julian calendar that is either 365 or 366 days, or 365.25 days on average
- Leap year – Calendar year with a day (or month) added
- Model year – Production date of a commercial product
- Ordinal date – Date written as number of days since first day of year
- Seasonal year – Time between successive recurrences of a seasonal event
