= Cynthiaol =

Chemical compound

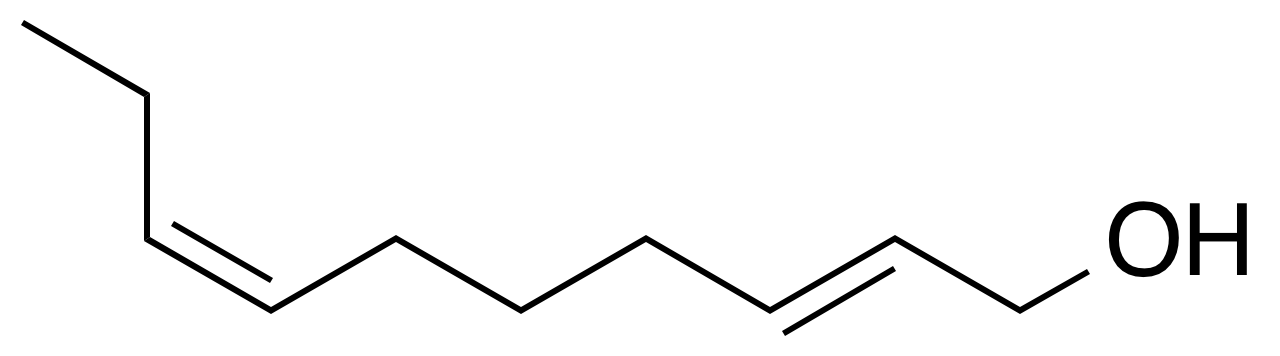

Names
- Preferred IUPAC name (2E,7Z)-Deca-2,7-dien-1-ol
- Other names Cynthiaol

Identifiers
CAS Number	1277185-24-6
3D model (JSmol)	Interactive image
ChemSpider	129432166
PubChem CID	154249569
UNII	8TZZ3WT865
CompTox Dashboard (EPA)	DTXSID001336729
- InChI: InChI=1S/C10H18O/c1-2-3-4-5-6-7-8-9-10-11/h3-4,8-9,11H,2,5-7,10H2,1H3/b4-3-,9-8+ Key: NBYIXRHJJYORAJ-VHPFQHCPSA-N
- SMILES: C(\C=C\CCC\C=C/CC)O

Properties
Chemical formula	C_{10}H_{18}O
Molar mass	154.253 g·mol^{−1}
- Except where otherwise noted, data are given for materials in their standard state (at 25 °C [77 °F], 100 kPa). Infobox references

Cynthiaol is a naturally occurring polyunsaturated fatty alcohol that is thought to be a flavor component of sea pineapple (Halocynthia roretzi), an edible sea squirt.
