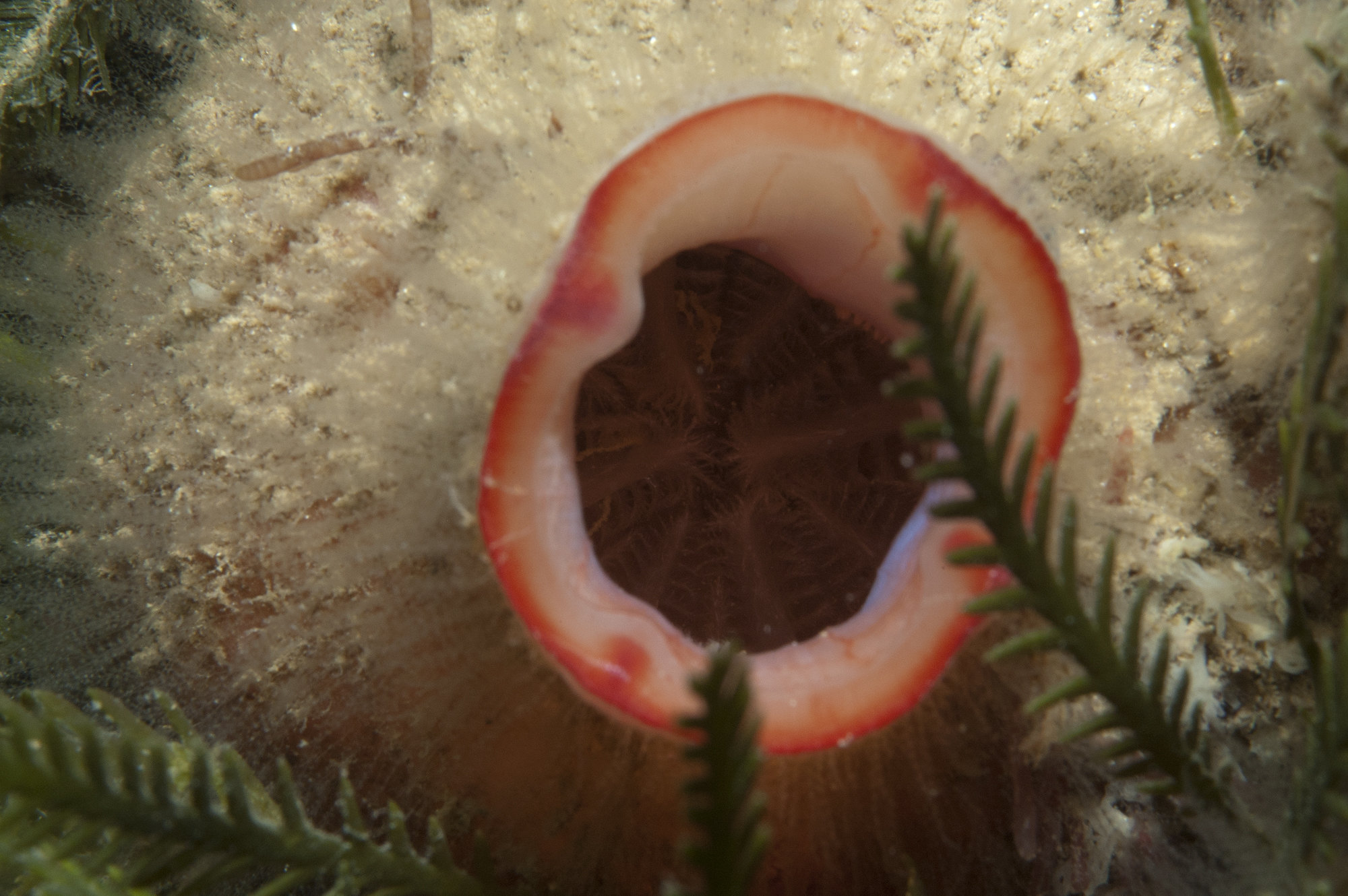
- Herdmania grandis

Scientific classification
- Kingdom: Animalia
- Phylum: Chordata
- Subphylum: Tunicata
- Class: Ascidiacea
- Order: Stolidobranchia
- Family: Pyuridae
- Genus: Herdmania; Lahille, 1888

Species
- See text

= Herdmania =

Genus of sea squirts

Herdmania is a genus of ascidian tunicates in the family Pyuridae.

== Species ==
Species within the genus Herdmania include:

- Herdmania armata Monniot & Monniot, 2001
- Herdmania colona Monniot & Monniot, 2003
- Herdmania coutieri Monniot, 2002
- Herdmania fimbriae Kott, 2002
- Herdmania grandis (Heller, 1878)
- Herdmania inflata (Van Name, 1918)
- Herdmania insolita Monniot & Monniot, 2001
- Herdmania japonica (Hartmeyer, 1909)
- Herdmania kiiensis Nishikawa, 2002
- Herdmania mauritiana (Drasche, 1884)
- Herdmania mentula Kott, 2002
- Herdmania mirabilis (Drasche, 1884)
- Herdmania momus (Savigny, 1816)
- Herdmania pallida (Heller, 1878)
- Herdmania pennata (Monniot & Monniot, 1991)
- Herdmania polyducta (Monniot & Monniot, 1989)
- Herdmania subpallida Nishikawa, 2002

Species names currently considered to be synonyms:

- Herdmania bostrichobranchus Metcalf, 1900: synonym of Bostrichobranchus pilularis (Verrill, 1871)
- Herdmania claviformis Ritter, 1903: synonym of Euherdmania claviformis (Ritter, 1903)
- Herdmania contorta Monniot, 1992: synonym of Herdmania momus (Savigny, 1816)
- Herdmania curvata Kott, 1952: synonym of Herdmania momus (Savigny, 1816)
- Herdmania vasculosa (Herdman, 1888): synonym of Ascidia bathybia Hartmeyer, 1922

== Habitat ==
Herdmania is a sedentary filter feeding tunicate found in marine habitats. The animal often occurs in gregorious form.

== Characters ==
The body flat purse like structure with length of 6-13 cms. Breadth is 4-7 cms. Colour is brownish. The animal is pretty buried in sand by means of foot. The body proper has two projections-atrial and branchial siphons. Branchial siphon has a branchial or incurrent aperture or mouth. The atrial siphon has atrial or excurrent aperture or cloaca. Each aperture is surrounded by four lobes or lips. The whole body is covered by thick leathery and translucent Tunic or test. The same is wrinkled. It is formed of cellulose like organic substances known as tunicin.

Herdmania is filter or ciliary feeder. Digestive tract is complete. Liver and pyloric glands are present. Respiration is with the help of branchial sac. Water enters the body from the region of mouth or branchial aperture, passes through the pharynx where food is picked up. It comes out through atrial aperture. The current is maintained by cilia lining the gill slits. Water current also helps in gaseous exchange.

== Reproduction ==
When disturbed, Herdmania emits a jet of water through both of its apertures. The animal is hermaphrodite. Cross fertilisation occurs which is external. Larval stage or tadpole undergoes retrogressive metamorphosis to become an adult.
