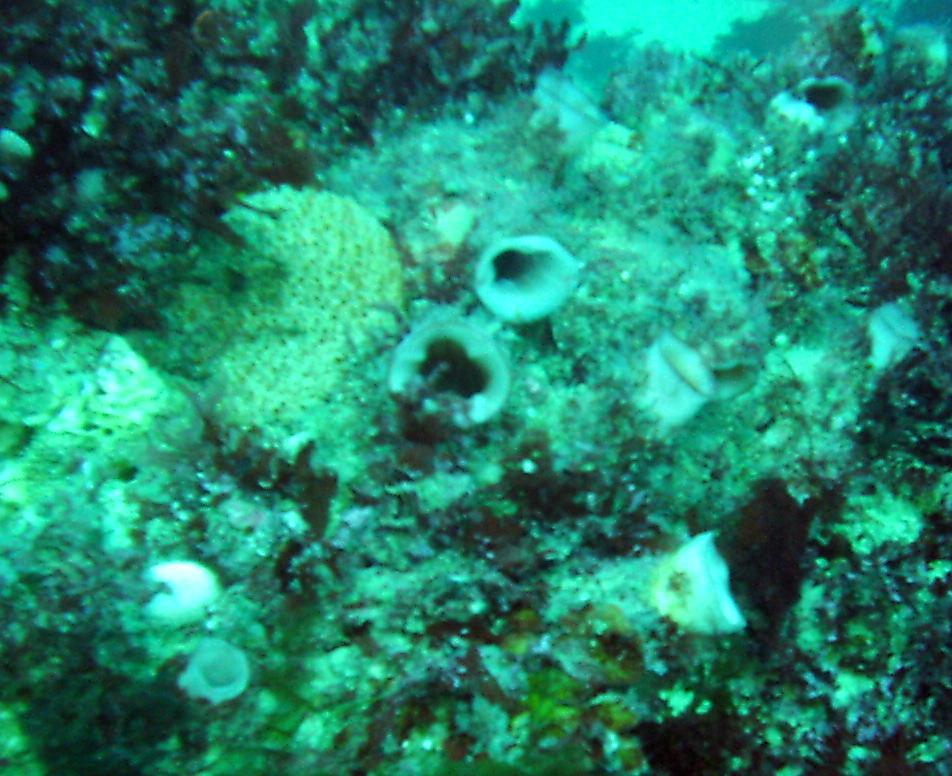

Scientific classification
- Domain: Eukaryota
- Kingdom: Animalia
- Phylum: Chordata
- Subphylum: Tunicata
- Class: Ascidiacea
- Order: Stolidobranchia
- Family: Pyuridae
- Genus: Herdmania
- Species: H. momus

Binomial name
- Herdmania momus (Savigny, 1816)

= Herdmania momus =

Species of sea squirt

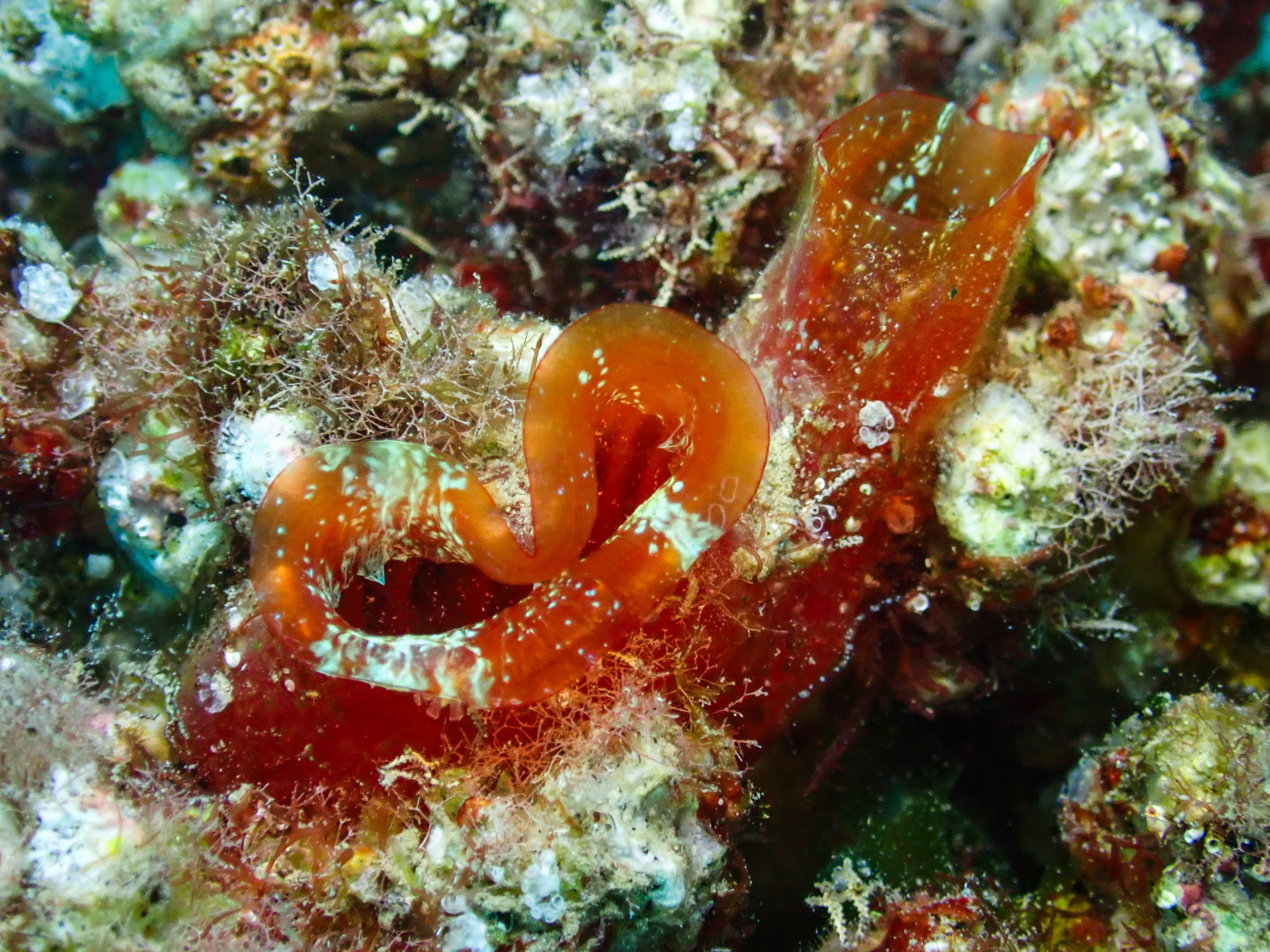
Herdmania momus found in Makadi Bay, Hurghada, Red Sea, Egypt

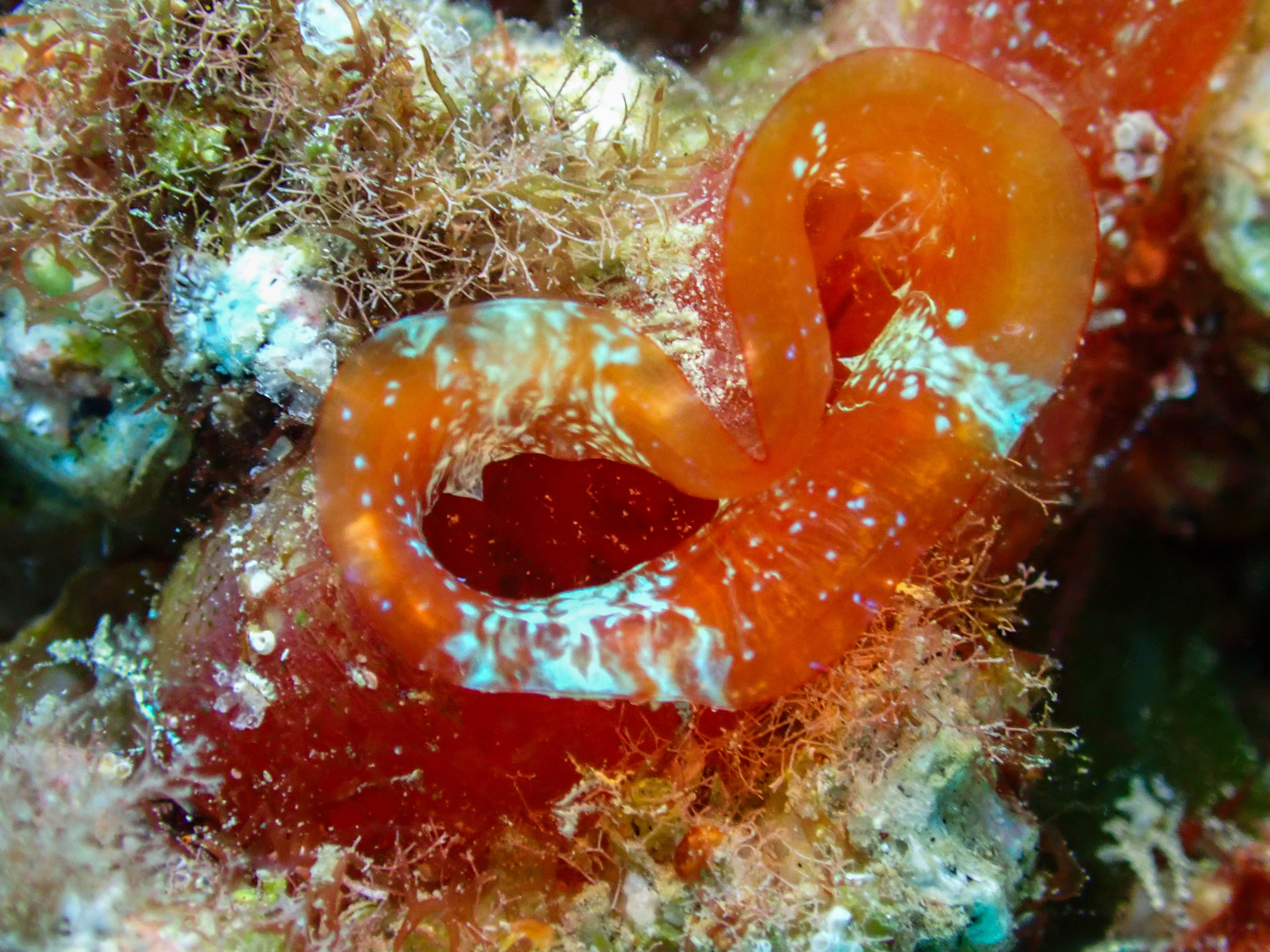
Herdmania momus found in Makadi Bay, Hurghada, Red Sea, Egypt

The solitary ascidian Herdmania momus is one of the most commonly encountered species of ascidians. While commonly referred to simply as sea squirts, this name is ambiguous, as it can refer to any member of the sub-phylum Tunicata.

This solitary ascidian is sometimes referred to as the red-throated ascidian, as its two siphons are a vivid red in colour. However, most solitary ascidians that are encountered are so covered in algae that the coloration is often not visible. When found at depth the red colourations may also not be visible, as lower frequencies of light are absorbed by the layers of water above.

Like all ascidians, H. momus is a sessile filter feeder. It is commonly found attached to rocks from depths of 3–50 metres (10–160 ft).
