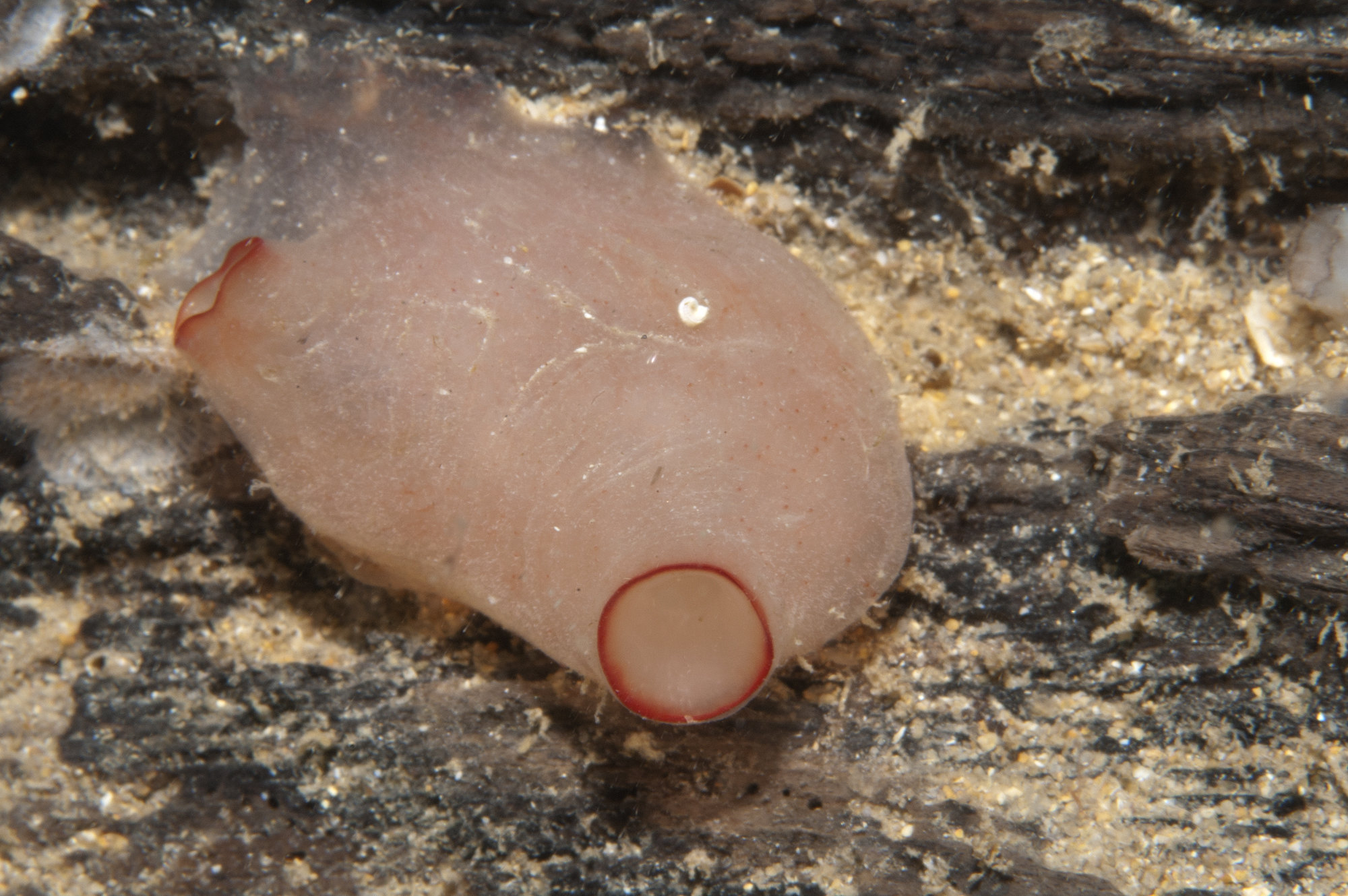

Scientific classification
- Domain: Eukaryota
- Kingdom: Animalia
- Phylum: Chordata
- Subphylum: Tunicata
- Class: Ascidiacea
- Order: Stolidobranchia
- Family: Pyuridae
- Genus: Herdmania
- Species: H. grandis

Binomial name
- Herdmania grandis (Heller, 1878)

Synonyms
- Cynthia complanata Herdman, 1881; Cynthia grandis Heller, 1878; Halocynthia grandis (Heller, 1878); Microcosmus draschi Herdman, 1891; Microcosmus julinii Drasche, 1884; Rhabdocynthia complanata (Herdman, 1882); Rhabdocynthia draschii (Herdman, 1891)

= Herdmania grandis =

Species of sea squirt

Herdmania grandis is a species of sea-squirt in the family Pyuridae.

The first scientific description of the species was by Camill Heller in 1878 as Cynthia grandis from a specimen found in Port Jackson. It has been both recombined and redescribed many times, and the decision for synonymy is based on work by Patricia Kott in 2002.
