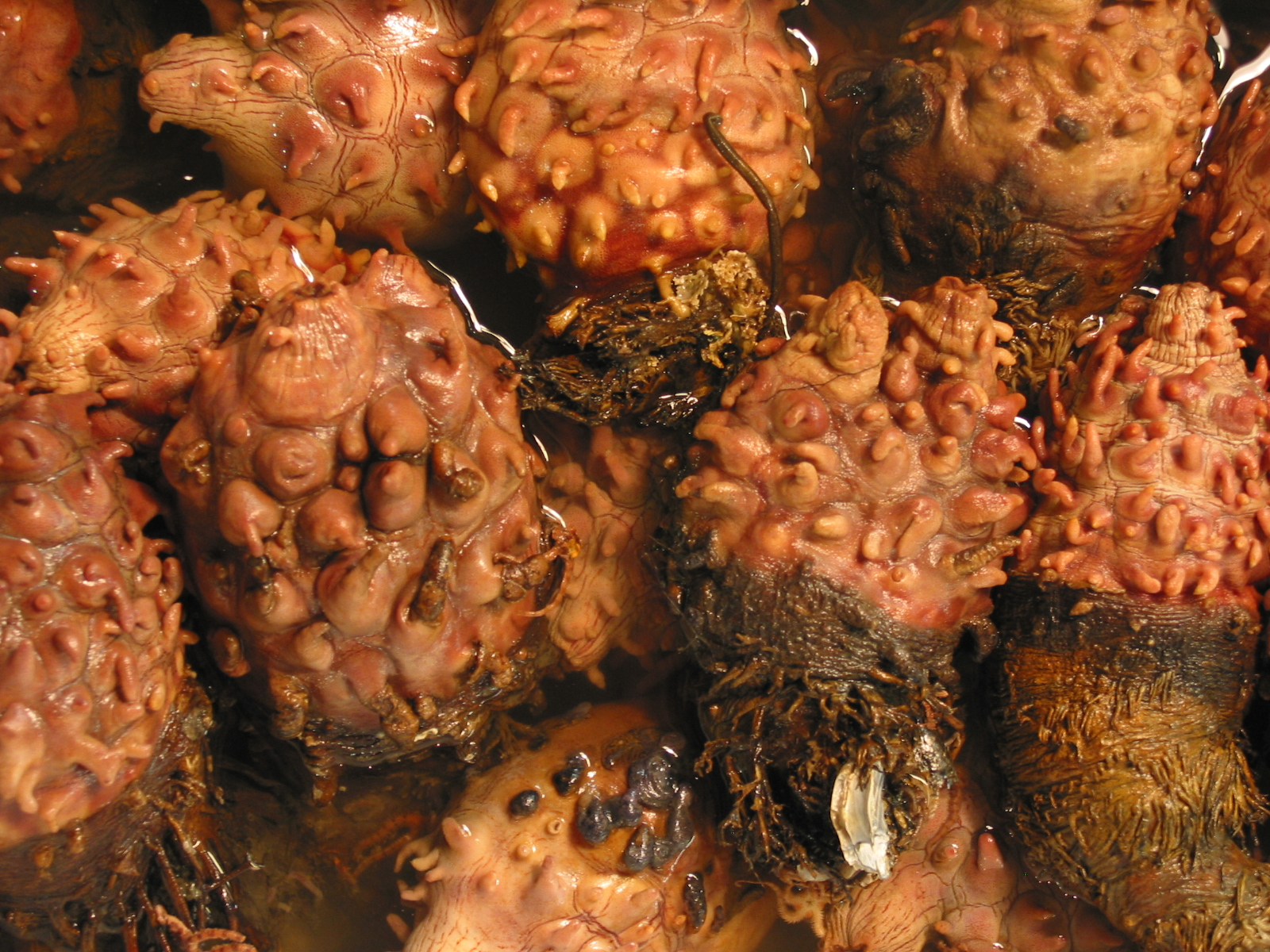

Scientific classification
- Kingdom: Animalia
- Phylum: Chordata
- Subphylum: Tunicata
- Class: Ascidiacea
- Order: Stolidobranchia
- Family: Pyuridae
- Genus: Halocynthia
- Species: H. roretzi

Binomial name
- Halocynthia roretzi (Von Drasche, 1884)

= Sea pineapple =

Species of sea squirt

The sea pineapple (Halocynthia roretzi) is an edible ascidian (sea squirt) consumed primarily in Korea, where it is known as meongge (멍게), and to a lesser extent in Japan, where it is known as hoya (ホヤ) or maboya (マボヤ).

Sea pineapples are known for both their peculiar appearance, described by journalist Nick Tosches as "something that could exist only in a purely hallucinatory eco-system" and their peculiar taste, described as "something like iodine" and "rubber dipped in ammonia". However, aficionados claim that the taste is well suited to serving with sake. The flavor has been attributed to an unsaturated alcohol called cynthiaol, which is present in minute quantities.

Sea pineapples live in shallow water, usually attached to rocks and artificial structures, an example of marine biofouling. Halocynthia roretzi is adapted to cold water: it can survive in water temperatures between 2 and 24 °C (36 and 75 °F), but optimum temperature is around 12 °C (54 °F).

Aquaculture of sea pineapples first succeeded in 1982, when 39 metric tons were produced in Korea. Production reached a peak of 42,800 tons in 1994. The FAO estimates that total world sea pineapple production in 2006 was 21,500 tons, worth around US$18 million. Of this, 16,000 tons were cultivated in Japan, including 12,163 tons in Miyagi prefecture alone.

== Culinary uses ==
In Korea, sea pineapple is mostly eaten raw as meongge-hoe with vinegared gochujang, but it is also often pickled (meongge-jeot) or used to add flavor to kimchi.

In Japan, sea pineapple is most commonly eaten raw as sashimi, simply by slicing the animal vertically, removing the internal organs and serving them with vinegared soy sauce. It is also sometimes salted, smoked, grilled, deep-fried, or dried.

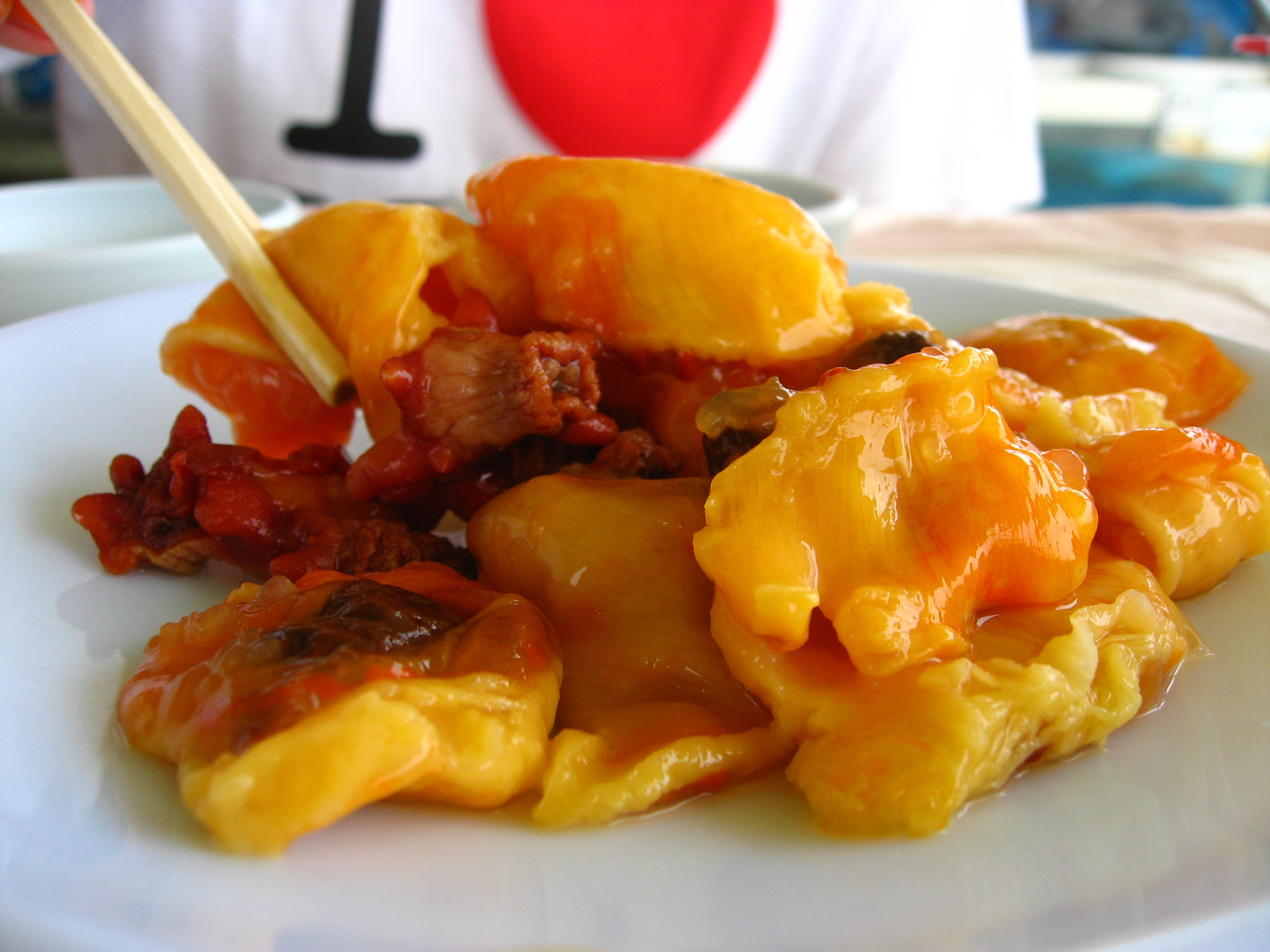
Meongge-hoe (raw sea pineapples)

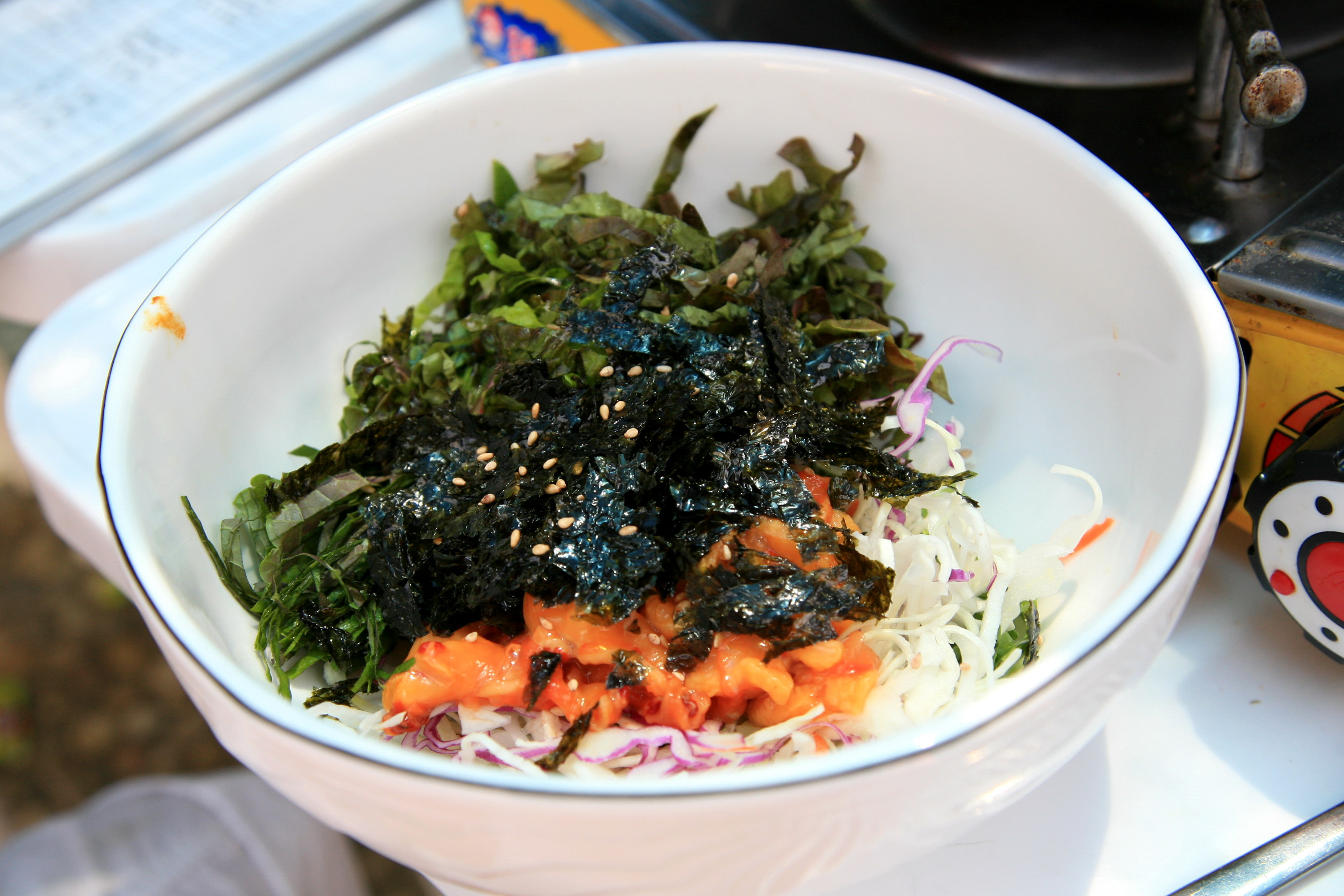
Meongge-hoe-bibimbap (mixed rice with raw sea pineapples)

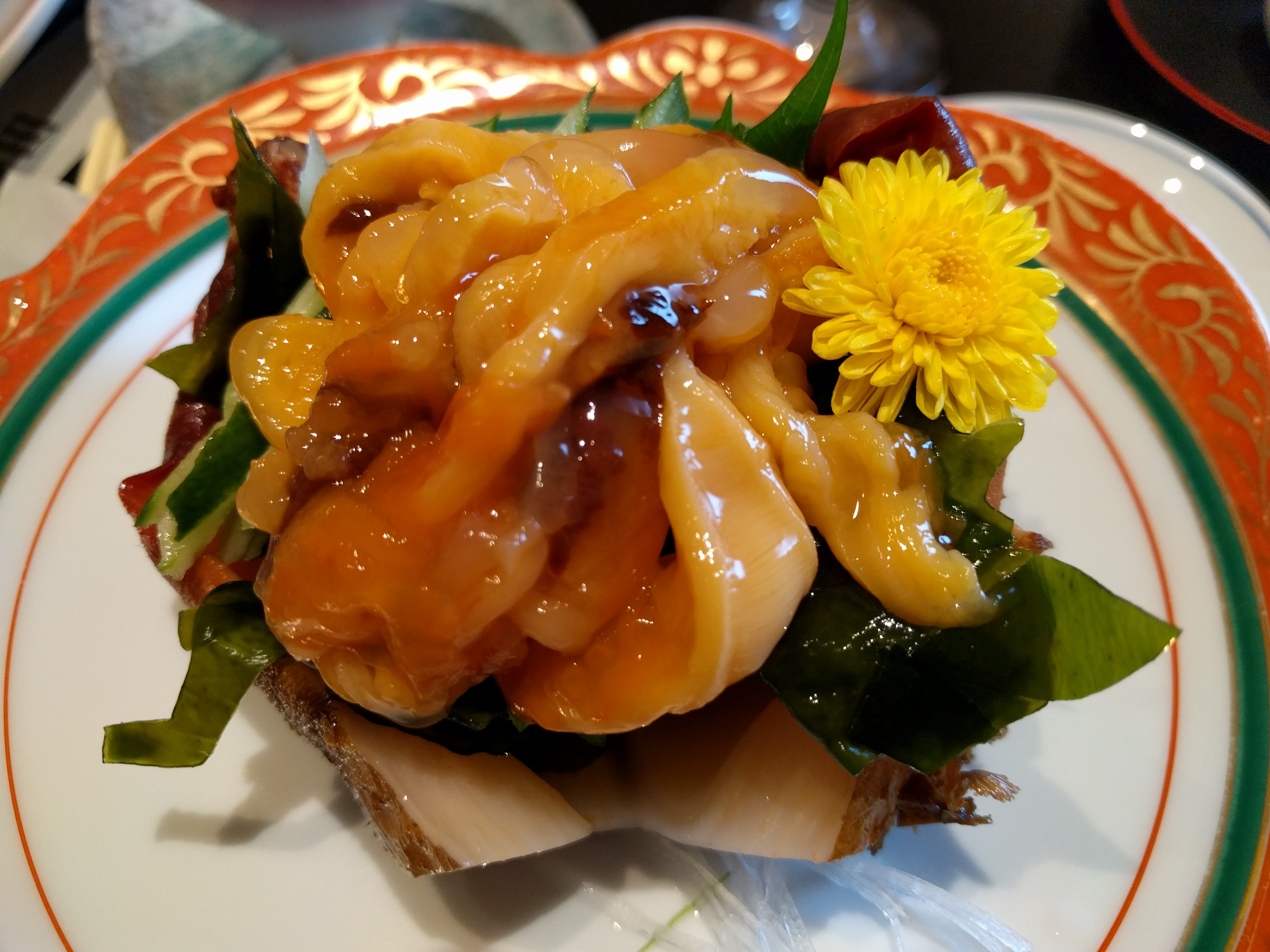
Sea pineapple (hoya) served as sashimi at a restaurant in Japan

== Safety ==
Paralytic shellfish toxins (PSTs) accumulate primarily in the hepatopancreas of sea pineapple, and research indicates that removing this organ can reduce toxin levels by approximately 90%. The species also bioaccumulates heavy metals including cadmium, lead, and copper, with the highest concentrations found in the gills and viscera. Additionally, aqueous extracts from the edible parts of Halocynthia roretzi have demonstrated cytotoxic activity against human cancer cells in laboratory studies, suggesting potential toxicity that requires further investigation.

== See also ==
- Halocyamine
- Sea squirts as food
