= Herdmania pallida =

Scientific classification
- Domain: Eukaryota
- Kingdom: Animalia
- Phylum: Chordata
- Subphylum: Tunicata
- Class: Ascidiacea
- Order: Stolidobranchia
- Family: Pyuridae
- Genus: Herdmania
- Species: H. pallida

Binomial name
- Herdmania pallida (Heller, 1878)

Synonyms
- Cynthia pallida Heller, 1878; Rhabdocynthia ceylonica (Herdman, 1906)

Species of sea squirt

Herdmania pallida is a species of sea-squirt in the family Pyuridae.

The first scientific description of the species was in 1878 as Cynthia pallida by Camill Heller. The synonym was a redescription by Herdman in 1906, but the decision for synonymy is based on work by Patricia Kott in 2002.

This animal is a filter-feeder and is only found amongst mangrove roots in Bocas del Toro.
