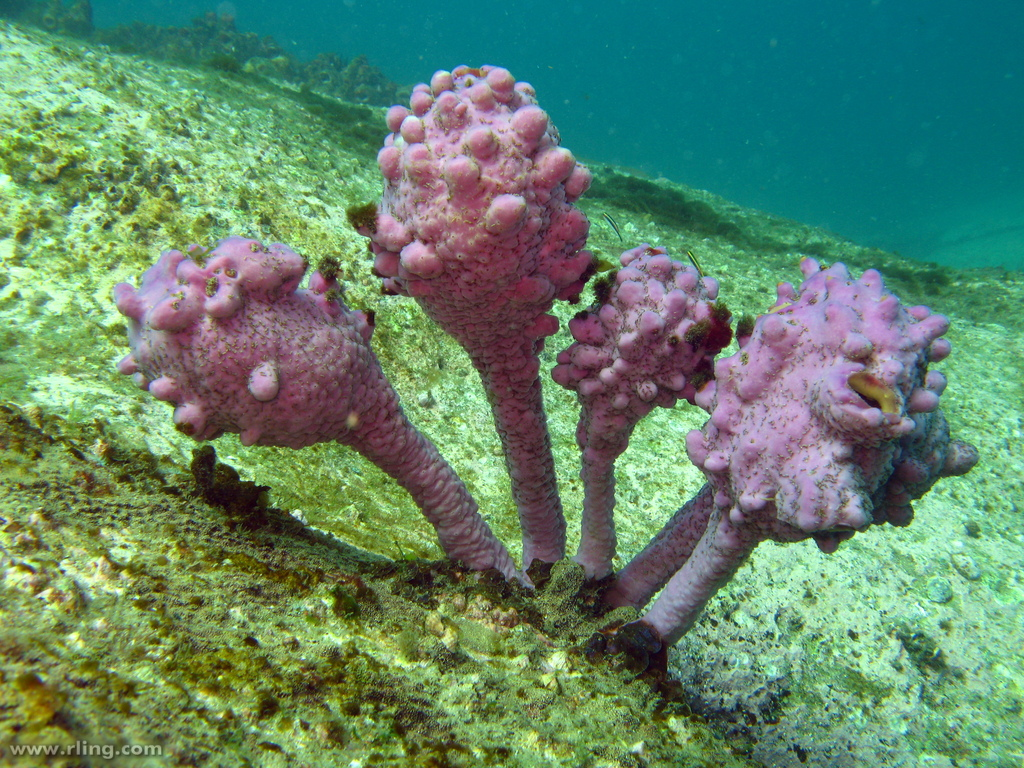

Scientific classification
- Domain: Eukaryota
- Kingdom: Animalia
- Phylum: Chordata
- Subphylum: Tunicata
- Class: Ascidiacea
- Order: Stolidobranchia
- Family: Pyuridae
- Genus: Pyura
- Species: P. spinifera

Binomial name
- Pyura spinifera (Quoy & Gaimard, 1834)

= Pyura spinifera =

Species of sea squirt

Pyura spinifera, commonly called the sea tulip, is a species of sessile ascidian that lives in coastal waters at depths of up to 80 m (260 feet). As with almost all other ascidians, sea tulips are filter feeders. The common name comes from the organism's appearance - that of a knobbly 'bulb' or flower attached to a long stalk. Sea tulips come in a variety of colours, including white, pink, yellow, orange, and purple. The coloration of sea tulips depends upon their association with a symbiotic sponge that covers their surface.
