= Seasonally adjusted annual rate =

The seasonally adjusted annual rate (SAAR) is a rate that is adjusted to take into account typical seasonal fluctuations in data and is expressed as an annual total. SAARs are used for data affected by seasonality, when it could be misleading to directly compare different times of the year.

SAARs are often used for car sales. Other examples of when SAARs could be used are occupancy rates at ski resorts, which are higher in the winter, or sales of ice cream, which are higher in the summer. Sales between seasons can be more easily compared using seasonally adjusted rates. The SAAR is calculated by dividing the unadjusted month rate for the month by its seasonality factor and multiplying by 12 to create an annual rate. (Quarterly data would be multiplied by 4.)

== See also ==
- Seasonal adjustment
