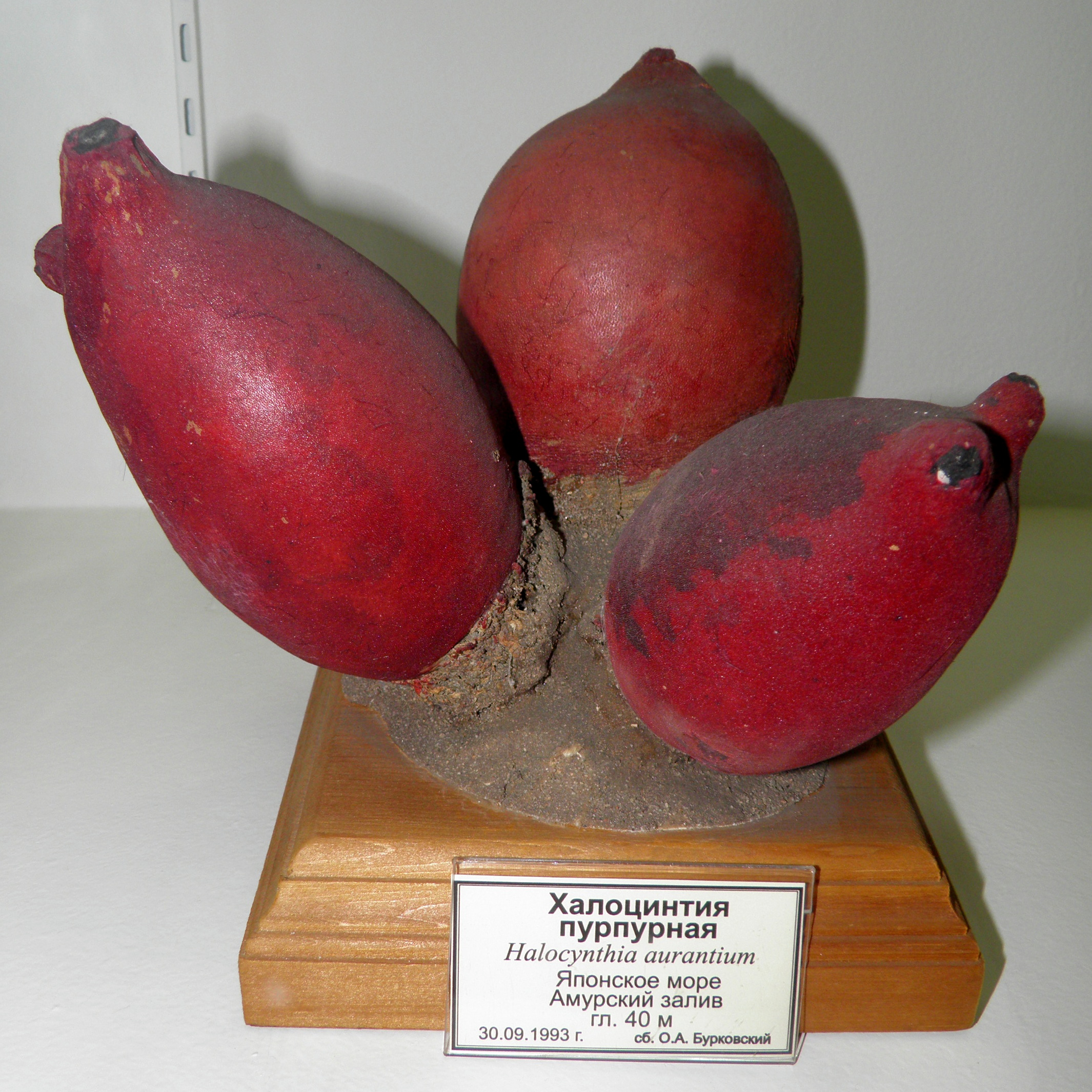

Scientific classification
- Kingdom: Animalia
- Phylum: Chordata
- Subphylum: Tunicata
- Class: Ascidiacea
- Order: Stolidobranchia
- Family: Pyuridae
- Genus: Halocynthia
- Species: H. aurantium

Binomial name
- Halocynthia aurantium Pallas, 1787

= Halocynthia aurantium =

Species of sea squirt

Halocynthia aurantium, commonly known as the sea peach, is a species of tunicate in the order Stolidobranchia. Sea peaches are commonly found in the northern Pacific Ocean, ranging from the Arctic Sea south to Puget Sound, and most common in the Bering Sea at a depth of 40 to 100 metres. The sea peach is typically barrel shaped, growing to a height of 18 centimetres, and its body is attached directly to the substrate. It is usually red or orange with a smooth or wrinkled tunic. There are two siphons at the top. The sea peach is preyed upon by crabs and sea stars.
