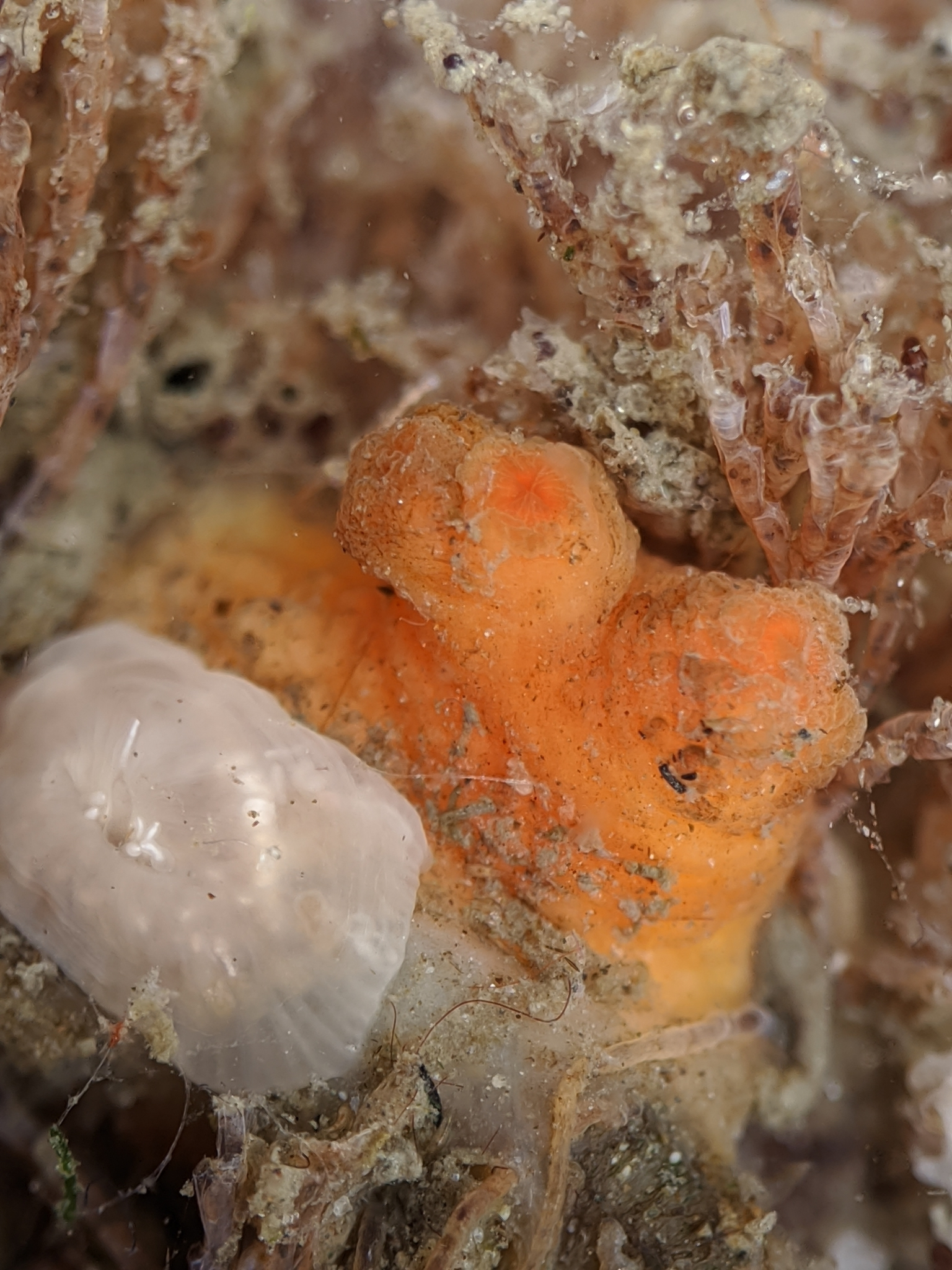

Scientific classification
- Domain: Eukaryota
- Kingdom: Animalia
- Phylum: Chordata
- Subphylum: Tunicata
- Class: Ascidiacea
- Order: Stolidobranchia
- Family: Pyuridae
- Genus: Pyura
- Species: P. haustor

Binomial name
- Pyura haustor (Stimpson, 1864)

Synonyms
- Cynthia erecta Ritter, 1900; Cynthia haustor Stimpson, 1864; Cynthia macrosiphonus Ritter, 1900; Halocynthia haustor (Stimpson, 1864); Halocynthia johnsoni Ritter, 1909; Halocynthia washingtonia Ritter, 1913

= Pyura haustor =

Species of chordates

Pyura haustor is a species of sessile ascidian, or sea squirt, that lives in coastal waters in the north-eastern Pacific Ocean, attached to rocks or artificial structures. Common names for this species include the wrinkled seapump, the wrinkled sea squirt and the warty tunicate.

== Description ==
This sea squirt is nearly as tall as it is wide, growing to about 5 by 3.5 cm (2.0 by 1.4 in). It is not attached to the substrate by a stalk, as are some members of the genus, but is attached over a wide base and appears roughly globular, with two obvious siphons projecting upwards. these siphons can be projected a long way when feeding, and can be retracted if danger threatens. The tunic is tough, wrinkled and folded, and does not have spiny projections. The color is usually dark brown, tinged with red on the siphons, but much of the surface is often hidden by sand, shell fragments or debris adhering to the tunic, or the tunic may be overgrown with other organisms.

== Distribution and habitat ==
Pyura haustor is native to the northeastern Pacific Ocean where its range extends from the Shumagin Islands in Alaska southwards to San Diego County, California. It is found attached to rocks, piers, pilings and floats, as well as to the holdfasts of kelp. It occurs in both sheltered and exposed locations, but in the San Juan Islands, where it is common, it avoids the areas with the strongest currents. Its depth range is from the lower intertidal zone down to about 200 m (660 ft).

== Ecology ==
Like other tunicates, this sea squirt draws in large quantities of water through its buccal siphon, filters out the edible particles and expels the water through the atrial siphon. Among the planktonic particles ingested are a variety of invertebrate larvae, however researchers have found that the activities of the sea squirt are not sufficient to deplete the local larval populations appreciably. The diet includes the eggs and larvae of crustaceans, echinoderms, mollusks and other tunicates.

The eggs of this sea squirt are gray, but there are conflicting reports on whether this species liberates the eggs into the water column or whether the developing embryos are brooded. The seastar Solaster stimpsoni is a predator of this tunicate.
