= TRAMO =

Statistical software

TRAMO ("Time Series Regression with ARIMA Noise, Missing Observations and Outliers") (Gómez y Maravall, 1996) is a program for estimation, forecasting, and interpolation of regression models with missing values and ARIMA errors, in the presence of possibly several types of outliers (no restriction is imposed on the location of the missing observations in the series). The program can be run in an entirely automatic manner.
