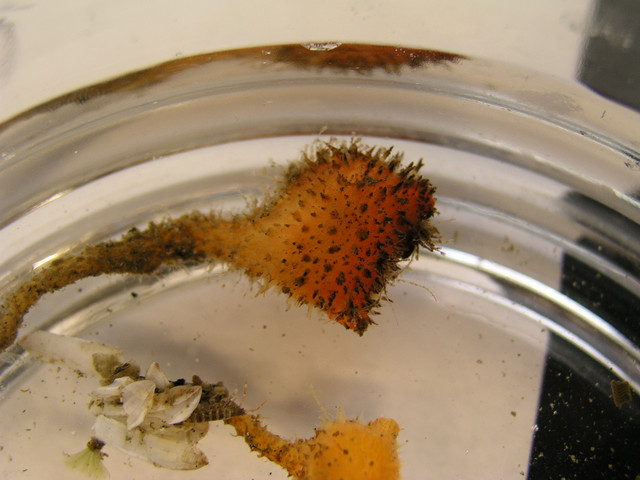

Scientific classification
- Domain: Eukaryota
- Kingdom: Animalia
- Phylum: Chordata
- Subphylum: Tunicata
- Class: Ascidiacea
- Order: Stolidobranchia
- Family: Pyuridae
- Genus: Boltenia
- Species: B. villosa

Binomial name
- Boltenia villosa (Stimpson, 1864)

Synonyms
- Cynthia castaneiformis Drasche, 1884; Cynthia villosa Stimpson, 1864; Halocynthia castaneiformis (Drasche, 1884); Halocynthia villosa (Stimpson, 1864); Pyura aculeata Hartmeyer, 1909; Pyura castaneiformis Drasche, 1884; Pyura villosa (Stimpson, 1864)

= Boltenia villosa =

Species of sea squirt

Boltenia villosa is a species of tunicate, a marine invertebrate of the family Pyuridae. Common names include spiny-headed tunicate, hairy sea squirt, stalked hairy sea squirt and bristly tunicate. This species was first described in 1864 by the American marine biologist William Stimpson who gave it the name Cynthia villosa. It was later transferred to the genus Boltenia. The type locality is Puget Sound, Washington state, United States.

== Description ==
A solitary, barrel shaped tunicate, Boltenia villosa can grow to a height of about 10 cm (4 in) and a width of 2.5 cm (1 in). It has a small base and is attached to the substrate by a stalk that may be short or long. The tunic is thickly clad with short, bristly, unbranched projections. The siphons, which may be difficult to see, are orange or red, and the tunic is light brown or orangish-red. This tunicate is similar in appearance to Boltenia echinata, which is found in the northern Atlantic Ocean, but the hair-like processes are more numerous, shorter and lack the radial branches that are present in B. echinata.

== Distribution ==
The species is found in the northeastern Pacific Ocean and the Arctic Ocean, at depths from the lower intertidal zone down to about 100 m (330 ft). It is found on both shelly and muddy bottoms.

== Ecology ==
Various tunicates concentrate the element vanadium in their body tissues, but B. villosa does this to a greater extent than most other species. Like other tunicates, it is a suspension feeder, drawing water in through the buccal siphon, extracting planktonic particles and expelling the water and waste through the atrial siphon. It feeds mainly on the larvae of crustaceans and molluscs, and on the eggs of various organisms. Sometimes a small crab or some copepods live symbiotically inside the body cavity. B. villosa is preyed on by the Oregon hairy triton (Fusitriton oregonensis), the leather star (Dermasterias imbricata) and the rainbow star (Orthasterias koehleri).
