= Seasonal year =

Time between successive recurrences of a seasonal event

The seasonal year is the time between successive recurrences of a seasonal event such as the flooding of a river, the migration of a species of bird, or the flowering of a species of plant.

The need for farmers to predict seasonal events led to the development of calendars. However, the variability from year to year of seasonal events (due to climate change or just random variation) makes the seasonal year very difficult to measure. This means that calendars are based on astronomical years (which are regular enough to be easily measured) as surrogates for the seasonal year. For example, the ancient Egyptians used the heliacal rising of Sirius to predict the flooding of the Nile.

A study of temperature records over the past 300 years suggests that the seasonal year is governed by the anomalistic year rather than the tropical year. This suggestion is surprising because the seasons have been thought to be governed by the tilt of the Earth's axis (see Effect of sun angle on climate). The two types of years differ by a mere 4 days over 300 years, so Thompson's result may not be significant. However, the result is not unreasonable. The seasons can be considered to be an oscillating system driven by two inputs with slightly different frequencies: the total input of energy from the sun varies with the anomalistic year, while the distribution of this energy between the hemispheres varies with the tropical year. In other physical situations, oscillating systems driven by two similar frequencies can latch onto either one. One point that must be considered is that the oscillation arising from the tilt of the axis is much greater than that arising from the distance of the sun.

== See also ==
- Deseasonalization
- Water year
