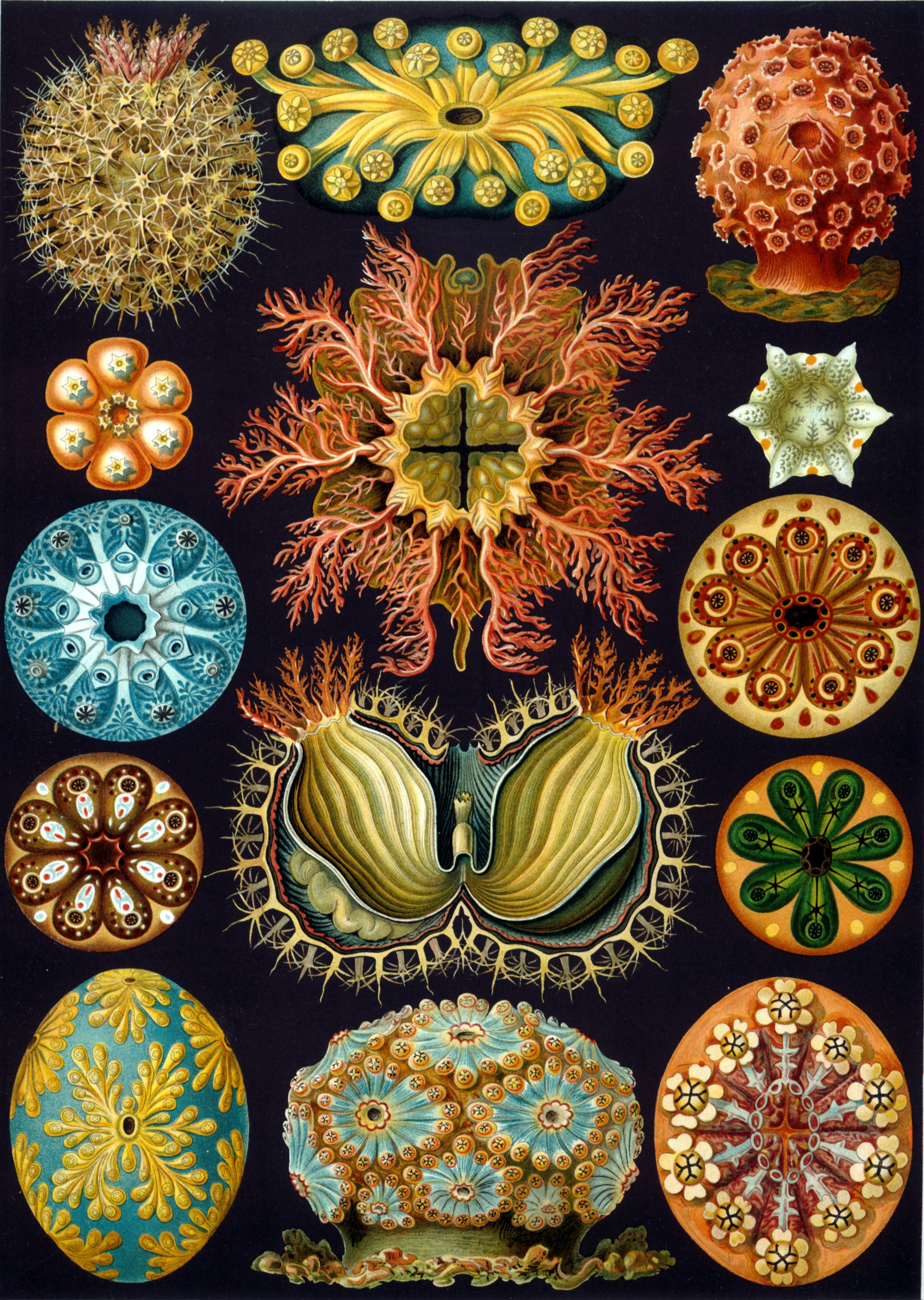
- "1" individual from above (top left) "2" individual from side (upper centre) "3" individual dissected (lower centre)

Scientific classification
- Kingdom: Animalia
- Phylum: Chordata
- Subphylum: Tunicata
- Class: Ascidiacea
- Order: Stolidobranchia
- Family: Pyuridae
- Genus: Boltenia
- Species: B. echinata

Binomial name
- Boltenia echinata (Linnaeus, 1767)

Synonyms
- Ascidia echinata Linnaeus, 1767; Ascidia hirsuta Agassiz, 1850; Boltenia arctica (Hartmeyer, 1899); Boltenia hirsuta (Agassiz, 1850); Cynthia arctica Hartmeyer, 1899; Cynthia echinata (Linnaeus, 1767); Cynthia hirsuta (Agassiz, 1850); Halocynthia arctica (Hartmeyer, 1899); Halocynthia echinata (Linnaeus, 1767); Microcosmus echinatus (Linnaeus, 1767); Pyura arctica (Hartmeyer, 1899); Pyura echinata (Linnaeus, 1767)

= Boltenia echinata =

Species of sea squirt

Boltenia echinata, commonly known as the cactus sea squirt, is a species of tunicate, a marine invertebrate in the genus Boltenia of the family Pyuridae. It is native to the Arctic Ocean and the northern Atlantic Ocean.

== Description ==
Boltenia echinata is a solitary sea squirt with a globose or ovoid body up to 2 cm (0.8 in) in diameter. The two small siphons are four-lobed and are near the top of the animal. The base is attached to the substrate over a large area. The test is tough and rubbery and bears radially-branching spines, which resemble hairs. The body colour is brown and the siphons may be tinged red, but the sea squirt is very inconspicuous because it is usually covered with silt.

== Distribution and habitat ==
Boltenia echinata occurs in the northern Atlantic Ocean and the Arctic Ocean. The range includes the coasts of Scotland and the Irish Sea, but not southern Britain. It is usually found in fairly sheltered silty habitats, attached to solid substrates at depths down to about 350 m (1,100 ft).
