= DNA and RNA codon tables =

List of standard rules to translate DNA encoded information into proteins

The standard RNA codon table organized in a wheel

A codon table can be used to translate a genetic code into a sequence of amino acids. The standard genetic code is traditionally represented as an RNA codon table, because when proteins are made in a cell by ribosomes, it is messenger RNA (mRNA) that directs protein synthesis. The mRNA sequence is determined by the sequence of genomic DNA. In this context, the standard genetic code is referred to as 'translation table 1' among other tables. It can also be represented in a DNA codon table. The DNA codons in such tables occur on the sense DNA strand and are arranged in a 5′-to-3′ direction. Different tables with alternate codons are used depending on the source of the genetic code, such as from a cell nucleus, mitochondrion, plastid, or hydrogenosome.

There are 64 different codons in the genetic code and the below tables; most specify an amino acid. Three sequences, UAG, UGA, and UAA, known as stop codons, (Note: Each stop codon has a specific name: UAG is amber, UGA is opal and UAA is ochre (sometimes for UGA, umber is used instead of opal). In DNA, these stop codons are TAG, TGA, and TAA, respectively.) do not code for an amino acid but instead signal the release of the nascent polypeptide from the ribosome. In the standard code, the sequence AUG—read as methionine—can serve as a start codon and, along with sequences such as an initiation factor, initiates translation. In rare instances, start codons in the standard code may also include GUG or UUG; these codons normally represent valine and leucine, respectively, but as start codons they are translated as methionine or formylmethionine.

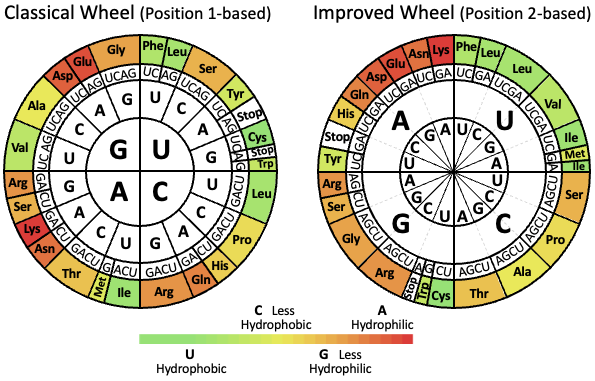
The second codon position best determines amino acid hydrophobicity. Color-coding: hydrophobicity from microenvironment in folded proteins

The classical table/wheel of the standard genetic code is arbitrarily organized based on codon position 1. Saier, following observations from Muto, showed that reorganizing the wheel based instead on codon position 2 (and reordering from UCAG to UCGA) better arranges the codons by the hydrophobicity of their encoded amino acids. This suggests that early ribosomes read the second codon position most carefully, to control hydrophobicity patterns in protein sequences.

The first table—the standard table—can be used to translate nucleotide triplets into the corresponding amino acid or appropriate signal if it is a start or stop codon. The second table, appropriately called the inverse, does the opposite: it can be used to deduce a possible triplet code if the amino acid is known. As multiple codons can code for the same amino acid, the International Union of Pure and Applied Chemistry's (IUPAC) nucleic acid notation is given in some instances.

== Translation table 1 ==
=== Standard RNA codon table ===
Amino-acid biochemical properties	Nonpolar	Polar	Basic	Acidic	Termination: stop codon

Standard genetic code (NCBI table 1)
1st base	2nd base								3rd base
1st base	U		C		A		G		3rd base
U	UUU	(Phe/F) Phenylalanine	UCU	(Ser/S) Serine	UAU	(Tyr/Y) Tyrosine	UGU	(Cys/C) Cysteine	U
U	UUC	(Phe/F) Phenylalanine	UCC	(Ser/S) Serine	UAC	(Tyr/Y) Tyrosine	UGC	(Cys/C) Cysteine	C
U	UUA	(Leu/L) Leucine	UCA	(Ser/S) Serine	UAA	Stop (Ochre)^{[B]}	UGA	Stop (Opal)^{[B]}	A
U	UUG ⇒^{[A]}	(Leu/L) Leucine	UCG	(Ser/S) Serine	UAG	Stop (Amber)^{[B]}	UGG	(Trp/W) Tryptophan	G
C	CUU	(Leu/L) Leucine	CCU	(Pro/P) Proline	CAU	(His/H) Histidine	CGU	(Arg/R) Arginine	U
C	CUC	(Leu/L) Leucine	CCC	(Pro/P) Proline	CAC	(His/H) Histidine	CGC	(Arg/R) Arginine	C
C	CUA	(Leu/L) Leucine	CCA	(Pro/P) Proline	CAA	(Gln/Q) Glutamine	CGA	(Arg/R) Arginine	A
C	CUG ⇒^{[A]}	(Leu/L) Leucine	CCG	(Pro/P) Proline	CAG	(Gln/Q) Glutamine	CGG	(Arg/R) Arginine	G
A	AUU	(Ile/I) Isoleucine	ACU	(Thr/T) Threonine	AAU	(Asn/N) Asparagine	AGU	(Ser/S) Serine	U
A	AUC	(Ile/I) Isoleucine	ACC	(Thr/T) Threonine	AAC	(Asn/N) Asparagine	AGC	(Ser/S) Serine	C
A	AUA	(Ile/I) Isoleucine	ACA	(Thr/T) Threonine	AAA	(Lys/K) Lysine	AGA	(Arg/R) Arginine	A
A	AUG ⇒^{[A]}	(Met/M) Methionine	ACG	(Thr/T) Threonine	AAG	(Lys/K) Lysine	AGG	(Arg/R) Arginine	G
G	GUU	(Val/V) Valine	GCU	(Ala/A) Alanine	GAU	(Asp/D) Aspartic acid	GGU	(Gly/G) Glycine	U
G	GUC	(Val/V) Valine	GCC	(Ala/A) Alanine	GAC	(Asp/D) Aspartic acid	GGC	(Gly/G) Glycine	C
G	GUA	(Val/V) Valine	GCA	(Ala/A) Alanine	GAA	(Glu/E) Glutamic acid	GGA	(Gly/G) Glycine	A
G	GUG	(Val/V) Valine	GCG	(Ala/A) Alanine	GAG	(Glu/E) Glutamic acid	GGG	(Gly/G) Glycine	G

^{A} Possible start codons in NCBI table 1. AUG is most common. The two other start codons listed by table 1 (CUG and UUG) are rare in eukaryotes. Prokaryotes have less strigent start codon requirements; they are described by NCBI table 11.
^{B} The historical basis for designating the stop codons as amber, ochre and opal is described in an autobiography by Sydney Brenner and in a historical article by Bob Edgar.

=== Inverse RNA codon table ===
Inverse table for the standard genetic code (compressed using IUPAC notation)
Amino acid	DNA codons	Compressed	Amino acid	DNA codons	Compressed
Ala, A	GCU, GCC, GCA, GCG	GCN	Ile, I	AUU, AUC, AUA	AUH
Arg, R	CGU, CGC, CGA, CGG; AGA, AGG	CGN, AGR; or CGY, MGR	Leu, L	CUU, CUC, CUA, CUG; UUA, UUG	CUN, UUR; or CUY, YUR
Asn, N	AAU, AAC	AAY	Lys, K	AAA, AAG	AAR
Asp, D	GAU, GAC	GAY	Met, M	AUG	
Asn or Asp, B	AAU, AAC; GAU, GAC	RAY	Phe, F	UUU, UUC	UUY
Cys, C	UGU, UGC	UGY	Pro, P	CCU, CCC, CCA, CCG	CCN
Gln, Q	CAA, CAG	CAR	Ser, S	UCU, UCC, UCA, UCG; AGU, AGC	UCN, AGY
Glu, E	GAA, GAG	GAR	Thr, T	ACU, ACC, ACA, ACG	ACN
Gln or Glu, Z	CAA, CAG; GAA, GAG	SAR	Trp, W	UGG	
Gly, G	GGU, GGC, GGA, GGG	GGN	Tyr, Y	UAU, UAC	UAY
His, H	CAU, CAC	CAY	Val, V	GUU, GUC, GUA, GUG	GUN
START	AUG, CUG, UUG	HUG	STOP	UAA, UGA, UAG	URA, UAR

=== Standard DNA codon table ===
The major difference between DNA and RNA is that thymine (T) is only found in the former. In RNA, it is replaced with uracil (U). This is the only difference between the standard RNA codon table and the standard DNA codon table.

Amino-acid biochemical properties	Nonpolar	Polar	Basic	Acidic	Termination: stop codon

Standard genetic code (NCBI table 1)
1st base	2nd base								3rd base
1st base	T		C		A		G		3rd base
T	TTT	(Phe/F) Phenylalanine	TCT	(Ser/S) Serine	TAT	(Tyr/Y) Tyrosine	TGT	(Cys/C) Cysteine	T
T	TTC	(Phe/F) Phenylalanine	TCC	(Ser/S) Serine	TAC	(Tyr/Y) Tyrosine	TGC	(Cys/C) Cysteine	C
T	TTA	(Leu/L) Leucine	TCA	(Ser/S) Serine	TAA	Stop (Ochre)^{[B]}	TGA	Stop (Opal)^{[B]}	A
T	TTG ⇒^{[A]}	(Leu/L) Leucine	TCG	(Ser/S) Serine	TAG	Stop (Amber)^{[B]}	TGG	(Trp/W) Tryptophan	G
C	CTT	(Leu/L) Leucine	CCT	(Pro/P) Proline	CAT	(His/H) Histidine	CGT	(Arg/R) Arginine	T
C	CTC	(Leu/L) Leucine	CCC	(Pro/P) Proline	CAC	(His/H) Histidine	CGC	(Arg/R) Arginine	C
C	CTA	(Leu/L) Leucine	CCA	(Pro/P) Proline	CAA	(Gln/Q) Glutamine	CGA	(Arg/R) Arginine	A
C	CTG ⇒^{[A]}	(Leu/L) Leucine	CCG	(Pro/P) Proline	CAG	(Gln/Q) Glutamine	CGG	(Arg/R) Arginine	G
A	ATT	(Ile/I) Isoleucine	ACT	(Thr/T) Threonine	AAT	(Asn/N) Asparagine	AGT	(Ser/S) Serine	T
A	ATC	(Ile/I) Isoleucine	ACC	(Thr/T) Threonine	AAC	(Asn/N) Asparagine	AGC	(Ser/S) Serine	C
A	ATA	(Ile/I) Isoleucine	ACA	(Thr/T) Threonine	AAA	(Lys/K) Lysine	AGA	(Arg/R) Arginine	A
A	ATG ⇒^{[A]}	(Met/M) Methionine	ACG	(Thr/T) Threonine	AAG	(Lys/K) Lysine	AGG	(Arg/R) Arginine	G
G	GTT	(Val/V) Valine	GCT	(Ala/A) Alanine	GAT	(Asp/D) Aspartic acid	GGT	(Gly/G) Glycine	T
G	GTC	(Val/V) Valine	GCC	(Ala/A) Alanine	GAC	(Asp/D) Aspartic acid	GGC	(Gly/G) Glycine	C
G	GTA	(Val/V) Valine	GCA	(Ala/A) Alanine	GAA	(Glu/E) Glutamic acid	GGA	(Gly/G) Glycine	A
G	GTG	(Val/V) Valine	GCG	(Ala/A) Alanine	GAG	(Glu/E) Glutamic acid	GGG	(Gly/G) Glycine	G

^{A} Possible start codons in NCBI table 1. ATG is most common. The two other start codons listed by table 1 (CTG and TTG) are rare in eukaryotes. Prokaryotes have less strigent start codon requirements; they are described by NCBI table 11.
^{B} The historical basis for designating the stop codons as amber, ochre and opal is described in an autobiography by Sydney Brenner and in a historical article by Bob Edgar.

=== Inverse DNA codon table ===
Inverse table for the standard genetic code (compressed using IUPAC notation)
Amino acid	DNA codons	Compressed	Amino acid	DNA codons	Compressed
Ala, A	GCT, GCC, GCA, GCG	GCN	Ile, I	ATT, ATC, ATA	ATH
Arg, R	CGT, CGC, CGA, CGG; AGA, AGG	CGN, AGR; or CGY, MGR	Leu, L	CTT, CTC, CTA, CTG; TTA, TTG	CTN, TTR; or CTY, YTR
Asn, N	AAT, AAC	AAY	Lys, K	AAA, AAG	AAR
Asp, D	GAT, GAC	GAY	Met, M	ATG	
Asn or Asp, B	AAT, AAC; GAT, GAC	RAY	Phe, F	TTT, TTC	TTY
Cys, C	TGT, TGC	TGY	Pro, P	CCT, CCC, CCA, CCG	CCN
Gln, Q	CAA, CAG	CAR	Ser, S	TCT, TCC, TCA, TCG; AGT, AGC	TCN, AGY
Glu, E	GAA, GAG	GAR	Thr, T	ACT, ACC, ACA, ACG	ACN
Gln or Glu, Z	CAA, CAG; GAA, GAG	SAR	Trp, W	TGG	
Gly, G	GGT, GGC, GGA, GGG	GGN	Tyr, Y	TAT, TAC	TAY
His, H	CAT, CAC	CAY	Val, V	GTT, GTC, GTA, GTG	GTN
START	ATG, CTG, UTG	HTG	STOP	TAA, TGA, TAG	TRA, TAR

== Alternative codons in other translation tables ==
The genetic code was once believed to be universal: a codon would code for the same amino acid regardless of the organism or source. However, it is now agreed that the genetic code evolves, resulting in discrepancies in how a codon is translated depending on the genetic source. For example, in 1981, it was discovered that the use of codons AUA, UGA, AGA and AGG by the coding system in mammalian mitochondria differed from the universal code. Stop codons can also be affected: in ciliated protozoa, the universal stop codons UAA and UAG code for glutamine. (Note: Euplotes octacarinatus is an exception.) Four novel alternative genetic codes (numbered here 34–37) were discovered in bacterial genomes by Shulgina and Eddy, revealing the first sense codon changes in bacteria. The following table displays these alternative codons.

Amino-acid biochemical properties	Nonpolar (np)	Polar (p)	Basic (b)	Acidic (a)	Termination: stop codon *

Comparison between codon translations with alternative and standard genetic codes
Code	Translation table	DNA codon involved	RNA codon involved	Translation with this code			Standard translation	Notes
Standard	1							Includes translation table 8 (plant chloroplasts).
Vertebrate mitochondrial	2	AGA	AGA	Stop *			Arg (R) (b)	
Vertebrate mitochondrial	2	AGG	AGG	Stop *			Arg (R) (b)	
Vertebrate mitochondrial	2	ATA	AUA	Met (M) (np)			Ile (I) (np)	
Vertebrate mitochondrial	2	TGA	UGA	Trp (W) (np)			Stop *	
Yeast mitochondrial	3	ATA	AUA	Met (M) (np)			Ile (I) (np)	
Yeast mitochondrial	3	CTT	CUU	Thr (T) (p)			Leu (L) (np)	
Yeast mitochondrial	3	CTC	CUC	Thr (T) (p)			Leu (L) (np)	
Yeast mitochondrial	3	CTA	CUA	Thr (T) (p)			Leu (L) (np)	
Yeast mitochondrial	3	CTG	CUG	Thr (T) (p)			Leu (L) (np)	
Yeast mitochondrial	3	TGA	UGA	Trp (W) (np)			Stop *	
Yeast mitochondrial	3	CGA	CGA	absent			Arg (R) (b)	
Yeast mitochondrial	3	CGC	CGC	absent			Arg (R) (b)	
Mold, protozoan, and coelenterate mitochondrial + Mycoplasma / Spiroplasma	4	TGA	UGA	Trp (W) (np)			Stop *	Includes the translation table 7 (kinetoplasts).
Invertebrate mitochondrial	5	AGA	AGA	Ser (S) (p)			Arg (R) (b)	
Invertebrate mitochondrial	5	AGG	AGG	Ser (S) (p)			Arg (R) (b)	
Invertebrate mitochondrial	5	ATA	AUA	Met (M) (np)			Ile (I) (np)	
Invertebrate mitochondrial	5	TGA	UGA	Trp (W) (np)			Stop *	
Ciliate, dasycladacean and Hexamita nuclear	6	TAA	UAA	Gln (Q) (p)			Stop *	
Ciliate, dasycladacean and Hexamita nuclear	6	TAG	UAG	Gln (Q) (p)			Stop *	
Echinoderm and flatworm mitochondrial	9	AAA	AAA	Asn (N) (p)			Lys (K) (b)	
Echinoderm and flatworm mitochondrial	9	AGA	AGA	Ser (S) (p)			Arg (R) (b)	
Echinoderm and flatworm mitochondrial	9	AGG	AGG	Ser (S) (p)			Arg (R) (b)	
Echinoderm and flatworm mitochondrial	9	TGA	UGA	Trp (W) (np)			Stop *	
Euplotid nuclear	10	TGA	UGA	Cys (C) (p)			Stop *	
Bacterial, archaeal and plant plastid	11							See translation table 1.
Alternative yeast nuclear	12	CTG	CUG	Ser (S) (p)			Leu (L) (np)	
Ascidian mitochondrial	13	AGA	AGA	Gly (G) (np)			Arg (R) (b)	
Ascidian mitochondrial	13	AGG	AGG	Gly (G) (np)			Arg (R) (b)	
Ascidian mitochondrial	13	ATA	AUA	Met (M) (np)			Ile (I) (np)	
Ascidian mitochondrial	13	TGA	UGA	Trp (W) (np)			Stop *	
Alternative flatworm mitochondrial	14	AAA	AAA	Asn (N) (p)			Lys (K) (b)	
Alternative flatworm mitochondrial	14	AGA	AGA	Ser (S) (p)			Arg (R) (b)	
Alternative flatworm mitochondrial	14	AGG	AGG	Ser (S) (p)			Arg (R) (b)	
Alternative flatworm mitochondrial	14	TAA	UAA	Tyr (Y) (p)			Stop *	
Alternative flatworm mitochondrial	14	TGA	UGA	Trp (W) (np)			Stop *	
Blepharisma nuclear	15	TAG	UAG	Gln (Q) (p)			Stop *	As of Nov. 18, 2016: absent from the NCBI update. Similar to translation table 6.
Chlorophycean mitochondrial	16	TAG	UAG	Leu (L) (np)			Stop *	
Trematode mitochondrial	21	TGA	UGA	Trp (W) (np)			Stop *	
Trematode mitochondrial	21	ATA	AUA	Met (M) (np)			Ile (I) (np)	
Trematode mitochondrial	21	AGA	AGA	Ser (S)			Arg (R) (b)	
Trematode mitochondrial	21	AGG	AGG	Ser (S) (p)			Arg (R) (b)	
Trematode mitochondrial	21	AAA	AAA	Asn (N) (p)			Lys (K) (b)	
Scenedesmus obliquus mitochondrial	22	TCA	UCA	Stop *			Ser (S) (p)	
Scenedesmus obliquus mitochondrial	22	TAG	UAG	Leu (L) (np)			Stop *	
Thraustochytrium mitochondrial	23	TTA	UUA	Stop *			Leu (L) (np)	Similar to translation table 11.
Pterobranchia mitochondrial	24	AGA	AGA	Ser (S) (p)			Arg (R) (b)	
Pterobranchia mitochondrial	24	AGG	AGG	Lys (K) (b)			Arg (R) (b)	
Pterobranchia mitochondrial	24	TGA	UGA	Trp (W) (np)			Stop *	
Candidate division SR1 and Gracilibacteria	25	TGA	UGA	Gly (G) (np)			Stop *	
Pachysolen tannophilus nuclear	26	CTG	CUG	Ala (A) (np)			Leu (L) (np)	
Karyorelict nuclear	27	TAA	UAA	Gln (Q) (p)			Stop *	
Karyorelict nuclear	27	TAG	UAG	Gln (Q) (p)			Stop *	
Karyorelict nuclear	27	TGA	UGA	Stop *	or	Trp (W) (np)	Stop *	
Condylostoma nuclear	28	TAA	UAA	Stop *	or	Gln (Q) (p)	Stop *	
Condylostoma nuclear	28	TAG	UAG	Stop *	or	Gln (Q) (p)	Stop *	
Condylostoma nuclear	28	TGA	UGA	Stop *	or	Trp (W) (np)	Stop *	
Mesodinium nuclear	29	TAA	UAA	Tyr (Y) (p)			Stop *	
Mesodinium nuclear	29	TAG	UAG	Tyr (Y) (p)			Stop *	
Peritrich nuclear	30	TA	UAA	Glu (E) (a)			Stop *	
Peritrich nuclear	30	TAG	UAG	Glu (E) (a)			Stop *	
Blastocrithidia nuclear	31	TAA	UAA	Stop *	or	Glu (E) (a)	Stop *	
Blastocrithidia nuclear	31	TAG	UAG	Stop *	or	Glu (E) (a)	Stop *	
Blastocrithidia nuclear	31	TGA	UGA	Trp (W) (np)			Stop *	
Cephalodiscidae mitochondrial code	33	AGA	AGA	Ser (S) (p)			Arg (R) (b)	Similar to translation table 24.
Cephalodiscidae mitochondrial code	33	AGG	AGG	Lys (K) (b)			Arg (R) (b)	Similar to translation table 24.
Cephalodiscidae mitochondrial code	33	TAA	UAA	Tyr (Y) (p)			Stop *	Similar to translation table 24.
Cephalodiscidae mitochondrial code	33	TGA	UGA	Trp (W) (np)			Stop *	Similar to translation table 24.
Enterosoma	34	AGG	AGG	Met (M) (np)			Arg (R) (b)	
Peptacetobacter	35	CGG	CGG	Gln (Q) (p)			Arg (R) (b)	
Anaerococcus and Onthovivens	36	CGG	CGG	Trp (W) (np)			Arg (R) (b)	
Absconditabacterales	37	CGA	CGA	Trp (W) (np)			Arg (R) (b)	
Absconditabacterales	37	CGG	CGG	Trp (W) (np)			Arg (R) (b)	
Absconditabacterales	37	TGA	UGA	Gly (G) (np)			Stop *	

== See also ==
- Bioinformatics
- Pyrrolysine
- Selenocysteine
- List of genetic codes
