= SMIM35 =

Identifiers
- Aliases: SMIM35, TMPRSS4 antisense RNA 1, TMPRSS4-AS1, small integral membrane protein 35
- External IDs: GeneCards: SMIM35
Orthologs
Databases	NCBI: entry; OMA: entry
Species	Human	Mouse
Entrez	100526771	n/a
Ensembl	ENSG00000255274	n/a
UniProt	n a	n/a
RefSeq (mRNA)	n/a	n/a
RefSeq (protein)	n/a	n/a
Location (UCSC)	n/a	n/a
PubMed search		n/a
- Wikidata
View/Edit Human

Small integral membrane protein 35 (SMIM35) is a small membrane protein encoded by the SMIM35 gene in humans. The gene is located on the long arm of chromosome 11 at cytogenetic band 11q23.3. SMIM35 is predicted to be an integral membrane protein, but its biological function is not yet well understood by the scientific community.

== Transcript ==
The SMIM35 gene produces multiple transcripts through alternative splicing. These transcripts differ in their exon composition and can encode different protein isoforms. The reference transcript [NM_001354434] encodes the protein [NP_001341363].

== Translations and homologs ==
The annotated conceptual translation of human SMIM35 shows the protein coding sequence and identifies the start and stop codons. The start codon is highlighted in green, while the stop codon is highlighted in red. The figure provides a visual representation of the coding region used to translate the SMIM35 protein.

Annotated conceptual translation of human SMIM35. Green and red text indicate start and stop codons, respectively.
