= Peritrich nuclear code =

Nuclear genetic code in some ciliates

The peritrich nuclear code (translation table 30) is a genetic code used by the nuclear genome of the peritrich ciliates Vorticella and Opisthonecta.

== The code (30) ==
AAs = FFLLSSSSYYEECC*WLLLAPPPPHHQQRRRRIIIMTTTTNNKKSSRRVVVVAAAADDEEGGGG
Starts = --------------*--------------------M----------------------------
Base1 = TTTTTTTTTTTTTTTTCCCCCCCCCCCCCCCCAAAAAAAAAAAAAAAAGGGGGGGGGGGGGGGG
Base2 = TTTTCCCCAAAAGGGGTTTTCCCCAAAAGGGGTTTTCCCCAAAAGGGGTTTTCCCCAAAAGGGG
Base3 = TCAGTCAGTCAGTCAGTCAGTCAGTCAGTCAGTCAGTCAGTCAGTCAGTCAGTCAGTCAGTCAG

Bases: adenine (A), cytosine (C), guanine (G) and thymine (T) or uracil (U).

Amino acids: Alanine (Ala, A), Arginine (Arg, R), Asparagine (Asn, N), Aspartic acid (Asp, D), Cysteine (Cys, C), Glutamic acid (Glu, E), Glutamine (Gln, Q), Glycine (Gly, G), Histidine (His, H), Isoleucine (Ile, I), Leucine (Leu, L), Lysine (Lys, K), Methionine (Met, M), Phenylalanine (Phe, F), Proline (Pro, P), Serine (Ser, S), Threonine (Thr, T), Tryptophan (Trp, W), Tyrosine (Tyr, Y), and Valine (Val, V).

== Differences from the standard code ==
DNA codons	RNA codons	This code (30)	Standard code (1)
TAA	UAA	Glu (E)	Ter (*)
TAG	UAG	Glu (E)	Ter (*)

== See also ==
- List of all genetic codes: translation tables 1 to 16, and 21 to 31.
- The genetic codes database.
