= Condylostoma nuclear code =

Nuclear genetic code in some ciliates

The Condylostoma nuclear code (translation table 28) is a genetic code used by the nuclear genome of the heterotrich ciliate Condylostoma magnum. This code, along with translation tables 27 and 31, is remarkable in that every one of the 64 possible codons can be a sense codon. Experimental evidence suggests that translation termination relies on context, specifically proximity to the poly(A) tail. Near such a tail, PABP could help terminate the protein by recruiting eRF1 and eRF3 to prevent the cognate tRNA from binding.

== The code (28) ==
AAs = FFLLSSSSYYQQCCWWLLLAPPPPHHQQRRRRIIIMTTTTNNKKSSRRVVVVAAAADDEEGGGG
Starts = ----------**--*--------------------M----------------------------
Base1 = TTTTTTTTTTTTTTTTCCCCCCCCCCCCCCCCAAAAAAAAAAAAAAAAGGGGGGGGGGGGGGGG
Base2 = TTTTCCCCAAAAGGGGTTTTCCCCAAAAGGGGTTTTCCCCAAAAGGGGTTTTCCCCAAAAGGGG
Base3 = TCAGTCAGTCAGTCAGTCAGTCAGTCAGTCAGTCAGTCAGTCAGTCAGTCAGTCAGTCAGTCAG

Bases: adenine (A), cytosine (C), guanine (G) and thymine (T) or uracil (U).

Amino acids: Alanine (Ala, A), Arginine (Arg, R), Asparagine (Asn, N), Aspartic acid (Asp, D), Cysteine (Cys, C), Glutamic acid (Glu, E), Glutamine (Gln, Q), Glycine (Gly, G), Histidine (His, H), Isoleucine (Ile, I), Leucine (Leu, L), Lysine (Lys, K), Methionine (Met, M), Phenylalanine (Phe, F), Proline (Pro, P), Serine (Ser, S), Threonine (Thr, T), Tryptophan (Trp, W), Tyrosine (Tyr, Y), and Valine (Val, V).

== Differences from the standard code ==
DNA codons	RNA codons	This code (28)			Standard code (1)
TAA	UAA	Ter (*)	or	Gln (Q)	Ter (*)
TAG	UAG	Ter (*)	or	Gln (Q)	Ter (*)
TGA	UGA	Ter (*)	or	Trp (W)	Ter (*)

== See also ==
- List of all genetic codes: translation tables 1 to 16, and 21 to 31.
- The genetic codes database.
