= Mesodinium nuclear code =

Alternative genetic code in some ciliates

The Mesodinium nuclear code (translation table 29) is a genetic code used by the nuclear genome of the ciliates Mesodinium and Myrionecta.

== The code (29) ==
AAs = FFLLSSSSYYYYCC*WLLLAPPPPHHQQRRRRIIIMTTTTNNKKSSRRVVVVAAAADDEEGGGG
Starts = --------------*--------------------M----------------------------
Base1 = TTTTTTTTTTTTTTTTCCCCCCCCCCCCCCCCAAAAAAAAAAAAAAAAGGGGGGGGGGGGGGGG
Base2 = TTTTCCCCAAAAGGGGTTTTCCCCAAAAGGGGTTTTCCCCAAAAGGGGTTTTCCCCAAAAGGGG
Base3 = TCAGTCAGTCAGTCAGTCAGTCAGTCAGTCAGTCAGTCAGTCAGTCAGTCAGTCAGTCAGTCAG

Bases: adenine (A), cytosine (C), guanine (G) and thymine (T) or uracil (U).

Amino acids: Alanine (Ala, A), Arginine (Arg, R), Asparagine (Asn, N), Aspartic acid (Asp, D), Cysteine (Cys, C), Glutamic acid (Glu, E), Glutamine (Gln, Q), Glycine (Gly, G), Histidine (His, H), Isoleucine (Ile, I), Leucine (Leu, L), Lysine (Lys, K), Methionine (Met, M), Phenylalanine (Phe, F), Proline (Pro, P), Serine (Ser, S), Threonine (Thr, T), Tryptophan (Trp, W), Tyrosine (Tyr, Y), and Valine (Val, V).

== Differences from the standard code ==
DNA codons	RNA codons	This code (29)	Standard code (1)
TAA	UAA	Tyr (Y)	Ter (*)
TAG	UAG	Tyr (Y)	Ter (*)

== See also ==
- List of all genetic codes: translation tables 1 to 16, and 21 to 31.
- The genetic codes database.
