= Karyorelict nuclear code =

Nuclear genetic code in some ciliates

The karyorelictid nuclear code (translation table 27) is a genetic code used by the nuclear genome of the Karyorelictea ciliate Parduczia sp. This code, along with translation tables 28 and 31, is remarkable in that every one of the 64 possible codons can be a sense codon. Translation termination probably relies on context, specifically proximity to the poly(A) tail.

== The code (27) ==
AAs = FFLLSSSSYYQQCCWWLLLAPPPPHHQQRRRRIIIMTTTTNNKKSSRRVVVVAAAADDEEGGGG
Starts = --------------*--------------------M----------------------------
Base1 = TTTTTTTTTTTTTTTTCCCCCCCCCCCCCCCCAAAAAAAAAAAAAAAAGGGGGGGGGGGGGGGG
Base2 = TTTTCCCCAAAAGGGGTTTTCCCCAAAAGGGGTTTTCCCCAAAAGGGGTTTTCCCCAAAAGGGG
Base3 = TCAGTCAGTCAGTCAGTCAGTCAGTCAGTCAGTCAGTCAGTCAGTCAGTCAGTCAGTCAGTCAG

Bases: adenine (A), cytosine (C), guanine (G) and thymine (T) or uracil (U).

Amino acids: Alanine (Ala, A), Arginine (Arg, R), Asparagine (Asn, N), Aspartic acid (Asp, D), Cysteine (Cys, C), Glutamic acid (Glu, E), Glutamine (Gln, Q), Glycine (Gly, G), Histidine (His, H), Isoleucine (Ile, I), Leucine (Leu, L), Lysine (Lys, K), Methionine (Met, M), Phenylalanine (Phe, F), Proline (Pro, P), Serine (Ser, S), Threonine (Thr, T), Tryptophan (Trp, W), Tyrosine (Tyr, Y), and Valine (Val, V).

== Differences from the standard code ==
DNA codons	RNA codons	This code (27)			Standard code (1)
TAA	UAA	Gln (Q)			Ter (*)
TAG	UAG	Gln (Q)			Ter (*)
TGA	UGA	Ter (*)	or	Trp (W)	Ter (*)

== See also ==
- List of all genetic codes: translation tables 1 to 16, and 21 to 31.
- The genetic codes database.
