= Blastocrithidia nuclear code =

Nuclear genetic code in some flagellates

The Blastocrithidia nuclear code (translation table 31) is a genetic code used by the nuclear genome of the trypanosomatid genus Blastocrithidia. This code, along with translation tables 27 and 28, is remarkable in that every one of the 64 possible codons can be a sense codon.

== The code (31) ==
AAs = FFLLSSSSYYEECCWWLLLLPPPPHHQQRRRRIIIMTTTTNNKKSSRRVVVVAAAADDEEGGGG
Starts = ----------**-----------------------M----------------------------
Base1 = TTTTTTTTTTTTTTTTCCCCCCCCCCCCCCCCAAAAAAAAAAAAAAAAGGGGGGGGGGGGGGGG
Base2 = TTTTCCCCAAAAGGGGTTTTCCCCAAAAGGGGTTTTCCCCAAAAGGGGTTTTCCCCAAAAGGGG
Base3 = TCAGTCAGTCAGTCAGTCAGTCAGTCAGTCAGTCAGTCAGTCAGTCAGTCAGTCAGTCAGTCAG

Bases: adenine (A), cytosine (C), guanine (G) and thymine (T) or uracil (U).

Amino acids: Alanine (Ala, A), Arginine (Arg, R), Asparagine (Asn, N), Aspartic acid (Asp, D), Cysteine (Cys, C), Glutamic acid (Glu, E), Glutamine (Gln, Q), Glycine (Gly, G), Histidine (His, H), Isoleucine (Ile, I), Leucine (Leu, L), Lysine (Lys, K), Methionine (Met, M), Phenylalanine (Phe, F), Proline (Pro, P), Serine (Ser, S), Threonine (Thr, T), Tryptophan (Trp, W), Tyrosine (Tyr, Y), and Valine (Val, V).

== Differences from the standard code ==
DNA codons	RNA codons	This code (31)			Standard code (1)
TAA	UAA	Ter (*)	or	Glu (E)	Ter (*)
TAG	UAG	Ter (*)	or	Glu (E)	Ter (*)
TGA	UGA	Trp (W)			Ter (*)

== See also ==
- List of all genetic codes: translation tables 1 to 16, and 21 to 33.
- The genetic codes database.
