= Alternative yeast nuclear code =

Nuclear genetic code in some yeasts

The alternative yeast nuclear code (translation table 12) is a genetic code found in certain yeasts. However, other yeast, including Saccharomyces cerevisiae, Candida azyma, Candida diversa, Candida magnoliae, Candida rugopelliculosa, Yarrowia lipolytica, and Zygoascus hellenicus, definitely use the standard (nuclear) code.

== The code ==
AAs = FFLLSSSSYY**CC*WLLLSPPPPHHQQRRRRIIIMTTTTNNKKSSRRVVVVAAAADDEEGGGG
Starts = -------------------M---------------M----------------------------
Base1 = TTTTTTTTTTTTTTTTCCCCCCCCCCCCCCCCAAAAAAAAAAAAAAAAGGGGGGGGGGGGGGGG
Base2 = TTTTCCCCAAAAGGGGTTTTCCCCAAAAGGGGTTTTCCCCAAAAGGGGTTTTCCCCAAAAGGGG
Base3 = TCAGTCAGTCAGTCAGTCAGTCAGTCAGTCAGTCAGTCAGTCAGTCAGTCAGTCAGTCAGTCAG

Bases: adenine (A), cytosine (C), guanine (G) and thymine (T) or uracil (U).

Amino acids: Alanine (Ala, A), Arginine (Arg, R), Asparagine (Asn, N), Aspartic acid (Asp, D), Cysteine (Cys, C), Glutamic acid (Glu, E), Glutamine (Gln, Q), Glycine (Gly, G), Histidine (His, H), Isoleucine (Ile, I), Leucine (Leu, L), Lysine (Lys, K), Methionine (Met, M), Phenylalanine (Phe, F), Proline (Pro, P), Serine (Ser, S), Threonine (Thr, T), Tryptophan (Trp, W), Tyrosine (Tyr, Y), Valine (Val, V).

== Differences from the standard code ==
DNA codons	RNA codons	This code (12)	Standard code (1)
CTG	CUG	Ser (S)	Leu (L)

== Alternative initiation codons ==
- CAG may be used in Candida albicans.

== Systematic range ==
- Endomycetales (yeasts): Candida albicans, Candida cylindracea, Candida melibiosica, Candida parapsilosis, and Candida rugosa.

== See also ==
- List of genetic codes
