= Euplotid nuclear code =

Alternative genetic code in some spirotrich ciliates

The euplotid nuclear code (translation table 10) is the genetic code used by Euplotidae. The euplotid code is a socalled "symmetrical code", which results from the symmetrical distribution of the codons. This symmetry allows for arythmic exploration of the codon distribution. In 2013, shCherbak and Makukov, reported that "the patterns are shown to match the criteria of an intelligent signal."

== The code ==
AAs = FFLLSSSSYY**CCCWLLLLPPPPHHQQRRRRIIIMTTTTNNKKSSRRVVVVAAAADDEEGGGG
Starts = -----------------------------------M----------------------------
Base1 = TTTTTTTTTTTTTTTTCCCCCCCCCCCCCCCCAAAAAAAAAAAAAAAAGGGGGGGGGGGGGGGG
Base2 = TTTTCCCCAAAAGGGGTTTTCCCCAAAAGGGGTTTTCCCCAAAAGGGGTTTTCCCCAAAAGGGG
Base3 = TCAGTCAGTCAGTCAGTCAGTCAGTCAGTCAGTCAGTCAGTCAGTCAGTCAGTCAGTCAGTCAG

Bases: adenine (A), cytosine (C), guanine (G) and thymine (T) or uracil (U).

Amino acids: Alanine (Ala, A), Arginine (Arg, R), Asparagine (Asn, N), Aspartic acid (Asp, D), Cysteine (Cys, C), Glutamic acid (Glu, E), Glutamine (Gln, Q), Glycine (Gly, G), Histidine (His, H), Isoleucine (Ile, I), Leucine (Leu, L), Lysine (Lys, K), Methionine (Met, M), Phenylalanine (Phe, F), Proline (Pro, P), Serine (Ser, S), Threonine (Thr, T), Tryptophan (Trp, W), Tyrosine (Tyr, Y), Valine (Val, V)

== Differences from the standard code ==
| DNA codons | RNA codons | This code (10) | Standard code (1) |
|---|---|---|---|
| TGA | UGA | Cys (C) | STOP = Ter (*) |

== Systematic range ==
- Ciliata: Euplotidae

== See also ==
- List of genetic codes
