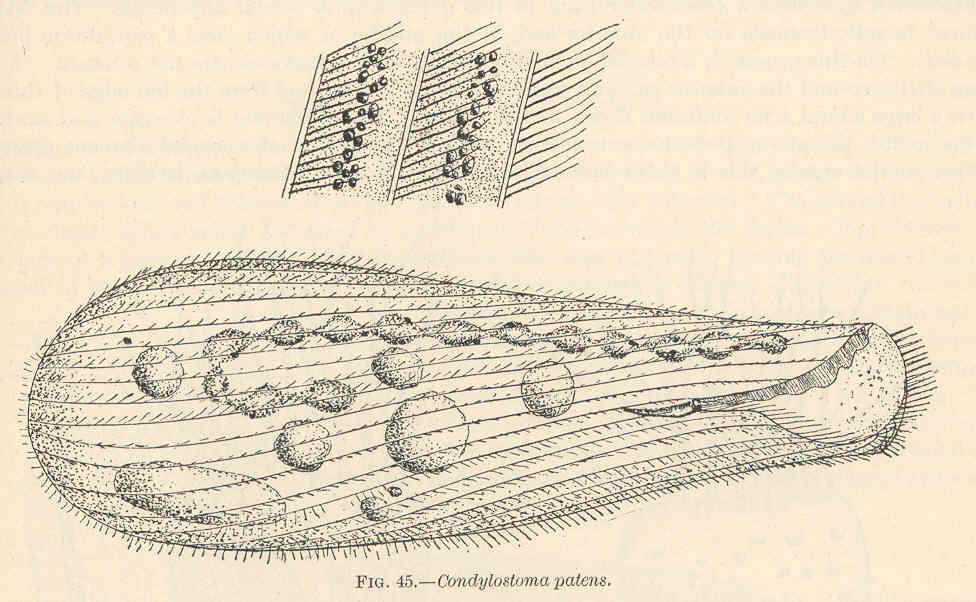
- Condylostoma patens

Scientific classification
- Domain: Eukaryota
- Clade: Sar
- Clade: Alveolata
- Phylum: Ciliophora
- Class: Heterotrichea
- Order: Heterotrichida
- Family: Condylostomatidae
- Genus: Condylostoma; Bory de Saint Vincent, 1826

= Condylostoma =

Genus of protists

Condylostoma is a genus of unicellular ciliate protists, belonging to the class Heterotrichea.

Condylostoma is a genus of heterotrichous made up of large ciliated cells. The genus was discovered by Jean Baptiste Bory de Saint-Vincent in 1826, and over 20 species have been described since then. They are mostly marine, but some are found in freshwater lakes, and they have habitats around the globe. Morphologically they are large cells with a buccal groove that is about one third of their total length, and they are covered in cilia which grow out of their longitudinal rows of kineties. They have an adoral zone of membranelles (AZM) around the buccal groove to help capture food, but no cilia are present in the groove itself. Another feature of note is their altered genetic code. Condylostoma includes mostly benthic organisms that spend most of their time gliding along substrate looking for food. They can eat many smaller organisms between 5 μm and 40 μm in size and are the prey of zooplankton and insects. Not only do they have an important role in their food webs, but they can also cause issues for humans due to their impacts on coral reefs and bivalve larvae.

== Etymology and history of knowledge ==
Condylostoma was discovered in 1826 by Jean Baptiste Bory de Saint-Vincent. The name originates from the Latin words condyle, meaning rounded end, and stoma, meaning a bodily opening. Since then much research has been done on the genus and over 20 species have been discovered through the use of both morphological and molecular data.

== Habitat and ecology ==
Condylostoma have been found around the world. Interestingly, most newly reported species from this genus seem to originate from brackish and tropical areas of Asia and Africa. In terms of habitat, they are mostly found in marine environments but some have been found in freshwater. In addition to being found in the ocean, they are known to inhabit the Alkaline-saline lakes, or soda lakes, in tropical Africa. These lakes are only inhabited by a few groups of organisms due to their relatively extreme environment. Not only can these lakes reach up to 50 °C, but they also have low oxygen solubility and high pHs ranging from 9-12, something that showcases Condylostoma's adaptability to different environments.

Condylostoma can feed on a large variety of sources between 5 μm and 40 μm in diameter, but they are not able to ingest filamentous organisms or organisms with large spines. Interestingly, they seem to show a preference for particular species, including the green aglae Kirchneriella, Dictyosphaerium, Chlamydomonas, and Cryptomanas while rejecting cyanobacteria like Dactylococcopsis, Aphanizomenan, Synedra, and Melosira. Nevertheless the main factor in its food selection seems to be morphological features like size and shape and not the taxon of the prey and there is no preference for green algae over diatoms for example). More specifically Condylostoma seems to prefer slightly larger organisms around 15 μm to 30 μm. In turn, Condylostoma have many predators, including zooplankton and insects. This makes them an important part of the food web as they affect many species and different types of organisms, and provide a link between bacteria and zooplankton in the food web alongside other protists.

== Description of the organism ==
=== Morphology ===
Condylostoma are very large elongated unicellular ciliates with lengths ranging from 176 to 1600 μm. They also tend to be about 7 times longer than their width. While the shape of the cell can vary depending on many factors, especially the amount and size of food vacuoles present, they are normally more rounded towards the middle of the cell and have a blunt posterior end. The relatively small buccal groove is about 1/3 the size of total body length and is present ventrally on the anterior part of the cell. The buccal groove is triangular. While there are no cilia inside the groove the surrounding "lips" are covered in cilia. Early papers describe a thin transparent undulating membrane around the buccal groove which is now known to be the adoral zone of membranes (AZM). These membranes can be composed of 70 to 200 polykinetids. They have a very elastic thin pellicula (membrane) surrounding the cell which can be 2 to 8 μm depending on the section. The cells are covered in longitudinal myonemes, which help make them contractile, and have trichocysts present in the posterior end of the cells. Being ciliates they are covered in cilia except in the buccal funnel. The cilia are oriented following the myonemes in rows. While the number of kinetosomes do not change during interphase, the length of the kineties do, to accommodate for the cell's change in size. Their cilia are long and slender, with the posterior cilia being the longest. Additionally, some research states that the ventral side of the cell has fewer, longer cilia than the dorsal end but this has been disputed. Additionally many species were found to have at least one frontal cirrus with some having up to four present. Looking at the interior of the cell, they are full of food vacuoles as well as cortical granules. They have a macronucleus with differing numbers of nodules ranging from 6 to 120. The pellicle of the cells is rough and dark grey, with randomly dispersed granules directly below it. The cell itself is almost colorless but has a slightly grey or yellow tinge to it. No contractile vacuole was observed at least in the marine species. The cells in this genus are notoriously hard to identify for two main reasons. First, there are many morphological differences between the species in this genus making it hard to identify them as belonging to the Condylostoma genus. Second, the species that have been described do not have as much detail as would be needed given the fact that there are few character states, otherwise known as traits, that can be used to identify cells as belonging to this genus.

=== Movement ===
These are mostly benthic organisms that glide along the sediment. The gliding is done by beating the cilia throughout their body, and interestingly the dorsal cilia tend to beat more slowly than the rest. They mostly glide forward but can turn by adjusting the posterior end of the cell, making it act as a rudder. Their standard gliding velocity is around 1mm per 2.9 seconds but they can speed up to 3 times that velocity when stimulated. Cells can also swim but are seldom seen doing this. They tend to swim in a spiral pattern due to the asymmetry of their body. When both gliding and swimming the organism has been observed to stop and move backwards when touching an object.

=== Genetics ===
Many ciliates use a slightly alternate genetic code compared to other eukaryotes. In the case of Condylostoma, stop codons have been reassigned to code for an amino acid . For these new substitutions TAA and TAG code for glutamine and TGA codes for tryptophan. The question then becomes how does Condylostoma stop translation? The answer seems to be that these codons can function both as stop codons and as normal amino acid encoders. In this case whether or not translation is ended seems to be dependent on the location of the "stop codon" in the transcript and how close they are to the 3′ end of the mRNA.

| Genetic code | Translation table | Codon | | Conditional translation | | | Standard translation |
| Genetic code | Translation table | DNA | RNA | Conditional translation | | | Standard translation |
|---|---|---|---|---|---|---|---|
| Condylostoma nuclear | 28 | TAA | UAA | Ter (*) | or | Gln (Q) | Ter (*) |
| Condylostoma nuclear | 28 | TAG | UAG | Ter (*) | or | Gln (Q) | Ter (*) |
| Condylostoma nuclear | 28 | TGA | UGA | Ter (*) | or | Trp (W) | Ter (*) |

| Amino-acid biochemical properties | Nonpolar | Polar | Termination: stop codon |

=== Life cycles ===
Condylostoma tends to be fairly slow-growing when compared to other protists. They demonstrated to have a lifespan of around 6 days in their normal form, but that they could encyst if they were starved or stressed. It is hypothesized that this is due to the fact that they feed mostly on algae. This is an abundant, yet seasonal food source, so they need to be able to survive during parts of the year when algae may not be present in high quantities, or may not be present at all. Division in these cells starts with the macronucleus beads fusing to form a band before they divide in two. Some of the polykinetids are passed onto the daughter cell and then renewed in the posterior position. Both the frontal cirri and paroral membranes need to be formed in the daughter cell.

== Practical importance ==
Condylostoma has been found to feed on the larvae of bivalves like oysters and clams. While this was only seen in a laboratory, each ciliate could ingest up to 7 larvae. At the moment the two have fairly separate niches in the wild, but if that were to change, or if Condylostoma invades a bivalve farm that could prove to have severe impacts. Condylostoma have also been tied to deteriorating coral reefs in some areas (alongside other protists). While the exact cause is not known, the current hypotheses are either that the organisms eat the bacteria that help the coral form or that they can spread bacterial diseases to the coral. In either of these cases, this can have a severe impact on the already fragile ecosystems of coral reefs.

== Species list ==
According to the World Register of Marine Species, genus Condylostoma contains 24 species:

- Condylostoma acuta Dragesco, 1954
- Condylostoma ancestralis Villeneuve-Brachon, 1940
- Condylostoma arenarium Spiegel, 1926
- Condylostoma caudatum Lauterborn, 1908
- Condylostoma curva Burkovsky, 1970
- Condylostoma enigmatica Dragesco, 1954
- Condylostoma fjeldi Hartwig, 1973
- Condylostoma granulosum Bullington, 1940
- Condylostoma kahli Dragesco, 1960
- Condylostoma magnum Spiegel, 1926
- Condylostoma minima Dragesco, 1960
- Condylostoma minutum Bullington, 1940
- Condylostoma nigra Dragesco, 1960
- Condylostoma patens O.F. Müller, 1786
- Condylostoma patulum Claparède & Lachmann, 1858
- Condylostoma psammophilum Bock, 1952
- Condylostoma remanei Spiegel, 1928
- Condylostoma rugosa Kahl, 1928
- Condylostoma spatiosum Ozaki & Yagiu in Yagiu, 1944
- Condylostoma subterraneum Lepsi, 1964
- Condylostoma tardum Penard, 1922
- Condylostoma tenuis Faure-Fremiet, 1958
- Condylostoma vastum Bock, 1955
- Condylostoma vorticella Ehrenberg, 1833

== Phylogeny ==
Molecular analyses based on either a single locus (small subunit rRNA) or several loci (SSU rDNA, large subunit rRNA, ITS1-5.8S-ITS2 region, alpha-tubulin and COI) showed that Condylostoma is phylogenetically related to the genera Condylostentor and Chattonidium, and with Condylostomides possibly being their sister-group.
