= Alternative flatworm mitochondrial code =

Alternative genetic code

The alternative flatworm mitochondrial code (translation table 14) is a genetic code found in the mitochondria of Platyhelminthes and Nematodes.

== Code ==
AAs = FFLLSSSSYYY*CCWWLLLLPPPPHHQQRRRRIIIMTTTTNNNKSSSSVVVVAAAADDEEGGGG
Starts = -----------------------------------M----------------------------
Base1 = TTTTTTTTTTTTTTTTCCCCCCCCCCCCCCCCAAAAAAAAAAAAAAAAGGGGGGGGGGGGGGGG
Base2 = TTTTCCCCAAAAGGGGTTTTCCCCAAAAGGGGTTTTCCCCAAAAGGGGTTTTCCCCAAAAGGGG
Base3 = TCAGTCAGTCAGTCAGTCAGTCAGTCAGTCAGTCAGTCAGTCAGTCAGTCAGTCAGTCAGTCAG

Bases: adenine (A), cytosine (C), guanine (G) and thymine (T) or uracil (U).

Amino acids: Alanine (Ala, A), Arginine (Arg, R), Asparagine (Asn, N), Aspartic acid (Asp, D), Cysteine (Cys, C), Glutamic acid (Glu, E), Glutamine (Gln, Q), Glycine (Gly, G), Histidine (His, H), Isoleucine (Ile, I), Leucine (Leu, L), Lysine (Lys, K), Methionine (Met, M), Phenylalanine (Phe, F), Proline (Pro, P), Serine (Ser, S), Threonine (Thr, T), Tryptophan (Trp, W), Tyrosine (Tyr, Y), Valine (Val, V)

== Differences from the standard code ==
DNA codons	RNA codons	This code (14)	Standard code (1)
AAA	AAA	Asn (N)	Lys (K)
AGA	AGA	Ser (S)	Arg (R)
AGG	AGG	Ser (S)	Arg (R)
TAA	UAA	Tyr (Y)	STOP = Ter (*)
TGA	UGA	Trp (W)	STOP = Ter (*)

== Systematic range and comments ==
- Platyhelminthes (flatworms) and Nematoda (roundworms).

Code 14 differs from code 9 (the echinoderm and flatworm mitochondrial code) only by translating UAA to Tyr rather than STOP. A study in 2000 has found no evidence that the codon UAA codes for Tyr in the flatworms but other opinions exist. There are very few GenBank records that are translated with code 14 but a test translation shows that re-translating these records with code 9 can cause premature terminations. More recently, UAA has been found to code for tyrosine in the nematodes Radopholus similis and Radopholus arabocoffeae.

== See also ==
- List of genetic codes
