= Candidate division SR1 and gracilibacteria code =

Alternative genetic code found in the genome of some bacteria

The candidate division SR1 and gracilibacteria code (translation table 25) is used in two groups of (so far) uncultivated bacteria found in marine and fresh-water environments and in the intestines and oral cavities of mammals among others. The difference to the standard and the bacterial code is that UGA represents an additional glycine codon and does not code for termination. A survey of many genomes with the codon assignment software Codetta, analyzed through the GTDB taxonomy system (release 220) shows that this genetic code is limited to the Patescibacteria order BD1-5, not what are now termed Gracilibacteria, and that the SR1 genome assembly GCA_000350285.1 for which the table 25 code was originally defined is actually using the Absconditibacterales genetic code and has the associated three special recoding tRNAs. Thus this code may now be better named the "BD1-5 code".

== The code ==
AAs = FFLLSSSSYY**CCGWLLLLPPPPHHQQRRRRIIIMTTTTNNKKSSRRVVVVAAAADDEEGGGG
Starts = ---M-------------------------------M---------------M------------
Base1 = TTTTTTTTTTTTTTTTCCCCCCCCCCCCCCCCAAAAAAAAAAAAAAAAGGGGGGGGGGGGGGGG
Base2 = TTTTCCCCAAAAGGGGTTTTCCCCAAAAGGGGTTTTCCCCAAAAGGGGTTTTCCCCAAAAGGGG
Base3 = TCAGTCAGTCAGTCAGTCAGTCAGTCAGTCAGTCAGTCAGTCAGTCAGTCAGTCAGTCAGTCAG

Bases: adenine (A), cytosine (C), guanine (G) and thymine (T) or uracil (U).

Amino acids: Alanine (Ala, A), Arginine (Arg, R), Asparagine (Asn, N), Aspartic acid (Asp, D), Cysteine (Cys, C), Glutamic acid (Glu, E), Glutamine (Gln, Q), Glycine (Gly, G), Histidine (His, H), Isoleucine (Ile, I), Leucine (Leu, L), Lysine (Lys, K), Methionine (Met, M), Phenylalanine (Phe, F), Proline (Pro, P), Serine (Ser, S), Threonine (Thr, T), Tryptophan (Trp, W), Tyrosine (Tyr, Y), and Valine (Val, V).

== Difference from the standard code ==
DNA codon	RNA codon	This code (25)	Standard code (1)
TGA	UGA	Gly (G)	STOP = Ter (*)

== Initiation codons ==
- AUG, GUG, UUG

== Systematic range ==
- Candidate Division SR1
- Gracilibacteria

== See also ==
- List of genetic codes
