= Absconditabacterales genetic code =

Unique genetic code demonstrated by Shulgina and Eddy in 2021

The Absconditabacterales genetic code (tentative code number 37) translates UGA to glycine, and CGG and GCA to tryptophan, as determined by the codon assignment software Codetta; it was further shown that these recodings are associated with three special tRNAs with appropriate anticodons and tRNA identity elements. Codetta called the Absconditibacterales code (sometimes leaving the rare CGA codon uncalled) for the following genome assemblies: GCA_002792495.1, GCA_001007975.1, GCA_003488625.1, GCA_003260355.1, GCA_003242865.1, GCA_000350285.1, GCA_002746475.1, GCA_007116275.1, GCA_007115995.1, GCA_002361595.1, GCA_000503875.1, GCA_003543185.1, GCA_002441085.1, and GCA_002791215.1. Review of the GTDB taxonomy system (release 220) for the order Absconditabacterales (phylum Patescibacteria) left two questionable genome assemblies (GCA_002414185.1, for which Codetta had called the CGA codon Arg, and GCA_937862565.1, the only known genome from the CALMFT01 family and untested by Codetta); spot-checking these two genomes shows that they both have all three special tRNAs, suggesting that the code is universal across the order.

Expected code (standard 1)	FFLLSSSSYY**CC*WLLLLPPPPHHQQRRRRIIIMTTTTNNKKSSRRVVVVAAAADDEEGGGG
Codetta-inferred code	FFLLSSSSYY??CCGWLLLLPPPPHHQQRRWWIIIMTTTTNNKKSSRRVVVVAAAADDEEGGGG

== See also ==
- Genetic codes: list of alternative codons
- List of genetic codes
