= Anaerococcus and Onthovivens genetic code =

Genetic code found in bacteria

The Anaerococcus and Onthovivens genetic code (tentative code number 36) translates CGG to tryptophan, as determined by the codon assignment software Codetta; it was further shown that this recoding is associated with a special tRNA with the appropriate anticodon and tRNA identity elements appropriate for such decoding. As currently known, this code is limited to two distinct clades, the genus Anaerococcus in the class Clostridia and the genus Onthovivens in the class Bacilli, as defined by the GTDB taxonomy system release 220. Codetta originally called the Anaerococcus and Onthovivens code for the following genome assemblies: GCA_000024105.1, GCA_900445285.1, GCA_902500265.1, GCA_900258475.1, GCA_002399785.1, GCA_004558005.1, GCA_900540365.1, GCA_900540395.1, GCA_900545015.1.

Expected code (standard 1)	FFLLSSSSYY**CC*WLLLLPPPPHHQQRRRRIIIMTTTTNNKKSSRRVVVVAAAADDEEGGGG
Codetta-inferred code	FFLLSSSSYY??CC?WLLLLPPPPHHQQRRRWIIIMTTTTNNKKSSRRVVVVAAAADDEEGGGG

== See also ==
- Genetic codes: list of alternative codons
- List of genetic codes
