= List of genetic codes =

Standard and alternative genetic codes

While there is much commonality, different parts of the tree of life use slightly different genetic codes. When translating from genome to protein, the use of the correct genetic code is essential. The mitochondrial codes are the relatively well-known examples of variation. The translation table list below follows the numbering and designation by NCBI.

1. The standard code
2. The vertebrate mitochondrial code
3. The yeast mitochondrial code
4. The mold, protozoan, and coelenterate mitochondrial code and the mycoplasma/spiroplasma code
5. The invertebrate mitochondrial code
6. The ciliate, dasycladacean and hexamita nuclear code
7. The deleted kinetoplast code; cf. table 4.
8. deleted, cf. table 1.
9. The echinoderm and flatworm mitochondrial code
10. The euplotid nuclear code
11. The bacterial, archaeal and plant plastid code
12. The alternative yeast nuclear code
13. The ascidian mitochondrial code
14. The alternative flatworm mitochondrial code
15. The Blepharisma nuclear code
16. The chlorophycean mitochondrial code
17. (none)
18. (none)
19. (none)
20. (none)
21. The trematode mitochondrial code
22. The Scenedesmus obliquus mitochondrial code
23. The Thraustochytrium mitochondrial code
24. The Pterobranchia mitochondrial code
25. The candidate division SR1 and gracilibacteria code
26. The Pachysolen tannophilus nuclear code
27. The karyorelict nuclear code
28. The Condylostoma nuclear code
29. The Mesodinium nuclear code
30. The peritrich nuclear code
31. The Blastocrithidia nuclear code
32. The Balanophoraceae plastid code
33. The Cephalodiscidae mitochondrial code
34. The Enterosoma code
35. The Peptacetobacter code
36. The Anaerococcus and Onthovivens code
37. The Absconditabacterales genetic code

The alternative translation tables (2 to 37) involve codon reassignments that are recapitulated in the DNA and RNA codon tables.

Four novel alternative genetic codes were discovered in bacterial genomes by Shulgina and Eddy using their codon assignment software Codetta, and validated by analysis of tRNA anticodons and identity elements; these codes are not currently adopted at NCBI, but are numbered here 34–37, and specified in the table below.

== Data format ==
Most data in this page is derived from the NCBI Genetic codes database, which consists of a machine-readable gc.prt file succinctly describing each translation table and some additional notes only visible on an associated web page wprintgc.cgi.

For each translation table, the gc.prt file provides its name(s), numeric id, and two 64-character tables called ncbieaa and sncbieaa. These tables map to the codons in the order of TTT, TTC, TTA, TTG, TCT, ... GGG; each character corresponds to the one-letter IUPAC amino acid code with the addition of * (termination) and - (gap). The former table is used for regular translation. The latter table is used to indicate initiation (if it contains a letter: at present only M for methionine), termination (if it contains a *), or neither (-). For usual ("unconditional") stop codons, a * is present in the equivalent positions of both tables. For conditional stop codons where a codon can either be stop or sense (tables 27, 28, 31), the ncbieaa table contains the sense translation, while sncbieaa has * indicating the possibility of a stop.

gc.prt also includes some non-machine-readable change history in comment form. The associated web page wprintgc.cgi provides notes and references for human reading.

As can be seen from the notes, the simple table format necessarily includes some flattening of biological variations for tables that cover broad taxonomic ranges. An example is the standard code (1), which originally only provided for AUG initiation, but was later changed to add UUG and CUG. However, this description still excludes known cases of GUG initiation known among fungi and mammals.

== Table summary ==
Comparison of alternative translation tables for all codons (using IUPAC amino acid codes):

Amino-acid biochemical properties	Nonpolar	Polar	Basic	Acidic	Termination: stop codon *

Codon	Translation table ID (see above)																														
Codon	1	2	3	4	5	6	9	10	11	12	13	14	15	16	21	22	23	24	25	26	27	28	29	30	31	32	33	34	35	36	37
TTT	F	F	F	F	F	F	F	F	F	F	F	F	F	F	F	F	F	F	F	F	F	F	F	F	F	F	F	F	F	F	F
TTC	F	F	F	F	F	F	F	F	F	F	F	F	F	F	F	F	F	F	F	F	F	F	F	F	F	F	F	F	F	F	F
TTA	L	L	L	L	L	L	L	L	L	L	L	L	L	L	L	L	*	L	L	L	L	L	L	L	L	L	L	L	L	L	L
TTG	L	L	L	L	L	L	L	L	L	L	L	L	L	L	L	L	L	L	L	L	L	L	L	L	L	L	L	L	L	L	L
TCT	S	S	S	S	S	S	S	S	S	S	S	S	S	S	S	S	S	S	S	S	S	S	S	S	S	S	S	S	S	S	S
TCC	S	S	S	S	S	S	S	S	S	S	S	S	S	S	S	S	S	S	S	S	S	S	S	S	S	S	S	S	S	S	S
TCA	S	S	S	S	S	S	S	S	S	S	S	S	S	S	S	*	S	S	S	S	S	S	S	S	S	S	S	S	S	S	S
TCG	S	S	S	S	S	S	S	S	S	S	S	S	S	S	S	S	S	S	S	S	S	S	S	S	S	S	S	S	S	S	S
TAT	Y	Y	Y	Y	Y	Y	Y	Y	Y	Y	Y	Y	Y	Y	Y	Y	Y	Y	Y	Y	Y	Y	Y	Y	Y	Y	Y	Y	Y	Y	Y
TAC	Y	Y	Y	Y	Y	Y	Y	Y	Y	Y	Y	Y	Y	Y	Y	Y	Y	Y	Y	Y	Y	Y	Y	Y	Y	Y	Y	Y	Y	Y	Y
TAA	*	*	*	*	*	Q	*	*	*	*	*	Y	*	*	*	*	*	*	*	*	Q	Q	Y	E	E	*	Y	*	*	*	*
TAG	*	*	*	*	*	Q	*	*	*	*	*	*	Q	L	*	L	*	*	*	*	Q	Q	Y	E	E	W	*	*	*	*	*
TGT	C	C	C	C	C	C	C	C	C	C	C	C	C	C	C	C	C	C	C	C	C	C	C	C	C	C	C	C	C	C	C
TGC	C	C	C	C	C	C	C	C	C	C	C	C	C	C	C	C	C	C	C	C	C	C	C	C	C	C	C	C	C	C	C
TGA	*	W	W	W	W	*	W	C	*	*	W	W	*	*	W	*	*	W	G	*	W	W	*	*	W	*	W	*	*	*	G
TGG	W	W	W	W	W	W	W	W	W	W	W	W	W	W	W	W	W	W	W	W	W	W	W	W	W	W	W	W	W	W	W
CTT	L	L	T	L	L	L	L	L	L	L	L	L	L	L	L	L	L	L	L	L	L	L	L	L	L	L	L	L	L	L	L
CTC	L	L	T	L	L	L	L	L	L	L	L	L	L	L	L	L	L	L	L	L	L	L	L	L	L	L	L	L	L	L	L
CTA	L	L	T	L	L	L	L	L	L	L	L	L	L	L	L	L	L	L	L	L	L	L	L	L	L	L	L	L	L	L	L
CTG	L	L	T	L	L	L	L	L	L	S	L	L	L	L	L	L	L	L	L	A	L	L	L	L	L	L	L	L	L	L	L
CCT	P	P	P	P	P	P	P	P	P	P	P	P	P	P	P	P	P	P	P	P	P	P	P	P	P	P	P	P	P	P	P
CCC	P	P	P	P	P	P	P	P	P	P	P	P	P	P	P	P	P	P	P	P	P	P	P	P	P	P	P	P	P	P	P
CCA	P	P	P	P	P	P	P	P	P	P	P	P	P	P	P	P	P	P	P	P	P	P	P	P	P	P	P	P	P	P	P
CCG	P	P	P	P	P	P	P	P	P	P	P	P	P	P	P	P	P	P	P	P	P	P	P	P	P	P	P	P	P	P	P
CAT	H	H	H	H	H	H	H	H	H	H	H	H	H	H	H	H	H	H	H	H	H	H	H	H	H	H	H	H	H	H	H
CAC	H	H	H	H	H	H	H	H	H	H	H	H	H	H	H	H	H	H	H	H	H	H	H	H	H	H	H	H	H	H	H
CAA	Q	Q	Q	Q	Q	Q	Q	Q	Q	Q	Q	Q	Q	Q	Q	Q	Q	Q	Q	Q	Q	Q	Q	Q	Q	Q	Q	Q	Q	Q	Q
CAG	Q	Q	Q	Q	Q	Q	Q	Q	Q	Q	Q	Q	Q	Q	Q	Q	Q	Q	Q	Q	Q	Q	Q	Q	Q	Q	Q	Q	Q	Q	Q
CGT	R	R	R	R	R	R	R	R	R	R	R	R	R	R	R	R	R	R	R	R	R	R	R	R	R	R	R	R	R	R	R
CGC	R	R	R	R	R	R	R	R	R	R	R	R	R	R	R	R	R	R	R	R	R	R	R	R	R	R	R	R	R	R	R
CGA	R	R	R	R	R	R	R	R	R	R	R	R	R	R	R	R	R	R	R	R	R	R	R	R	R	R	R	R	R	R	W
CGG	R	R	R	R	R	R	R	R	R	R	R	R	R	R	R	R	R	R	R	R	R	R	R	R	R	R	R	R	Q	W	W
ATT	I	I	I	I	I	I	I	I	I	I	I	I	I	I	I	I	I	I	I	I	I	I	I	I	I	I	I	I	I	I	I
ATC	I	I	I	I	I	I	I	I	I	I	I	I	I	I	I	I	I	I	I	I	I	I	I	I	I	I	I	I	I	I	I
ATA	I	M	M	I	M	I	I	I	I	I	M	I	I	I	M	I	I	I	I	I	I	I	I	I	I	I	I	I	I	I	I
ATG	M	M	M	M	M	M	M	M	M	M	M	M	M	M	M	M	M	M	M	M	M	M	M	M	M	M	M	M	M	M	M
ACT	T	T	T	T	T	T	T	T	T	T	T	T	T	T	T	T	T	T	T	T	T	T	T	T	T	T	T	T	T	T	T
ACC	T	T	T	T	T	T	T	T	T	T	T	T	T	T	T	T	T	T	T	T	T	T	T	T	T	T	T	T	T	T	T
ACA	T	T	T	T	T	T	T	T	T	T	T	T	T	T	T	T	T	T	T	T	T	T	T	T	T	T	T	T	T	T	T
ACG	T	T	T	T	T	T	T	T	T	T	T	T	T	T	T	T	T	T	T	T	T	T	T	T	T	T	T	T	T	T	T
AAT	N	N	N	N	N	N	N	N	N	N	N	N	N	N	N	N	N	N	N	N	N	N	N	N	N	N	N	N	N	N	N
AAC	N	N	N	N	N	N	N	N	N	N	N	N	N	N	N	N	N	N	N	N	N	N	N	N	N	N	N	N	N	N	N
AAA	K	K	K	K	K	K	N	K	K	K	K	N	K	K	N	K	K	K	K	K	K	K	K	K	K	K	K	K	K	K	K
AAG	K	K	K	K	K	K	K	K	K	K	K	K	K	K	K	K	K	K	K	K	K	K	K	K	K	K	K	K	K	K	K
AGT	S	S	S	S	S	S	S	S	S	S	S	S	S	S	S	S	S	S	S	S	S	S	S	S	S	S	S	S	S	S	S
AGC	S	S	S	S	S	S	S	S	S	S	S	S	S	S	S	S	S	S	S	S	S	S	S	S	S	S	S	S	S	S	S
AGA	R	*	R	R	S	R	S	R	R	R	G	S	R	R	S	R	R	S	R	R	R	R	R	R	R	R	S	R	R	R	R
AGG	R	*	R	R	S	R	S	R	R	R	G	S	R	R	S	R	R	K	R	R	R	R	R	R	R	R	K	M	R	R	R
GTT	V	V	V	V	V	V	V	V	V	V	V	V	V	V	V	V	V	V	V	V	V	V	V	V	V	V	V	V	V	V	V
GTC	V	V	V	V	V	V	V	V	V	V	V	V	V	V	V	V	V	V	V	V	V	V	V	V	V	V	V	V	V	V	V
GTA	V	V	V	V	V	V	V	V	V	V	V	V	V	V	V	V	V	V	V	V	V	V	V	V	V	V	V	V	V	V	V
GTG	V	V	V	V	V	V	V	V	V	V	V	V	V	V	V	V	V	V	V	V	V	V	V	V	V	V	V	V	V	V	V
GCT	A	A	A	A	A	A	A	A	A	A	A	A	A	A	A	A	A	A	A	A	A	A	A	A	A	A	A	A	A	A	A
GCC	A	A	A	A	A	A	A	A	A	A	A	A	A	A	A	A	A	A	A	A	A	A	A	A	A	A	A	A	A	A	A
GCA	A	A	A	A	A	A	A	A	A	A	A	A	A	A	A	A	A	A	A	A	A	A	A	A	A	A	A	A	A	A	A
GCG	A	A	A	A	A	A	A	A	A	A	A	A	A	A	A	A	A	A	A	A	A	A	A	A	A	A	A	A	A	A	A
GAT	D	D	D	D	D	D	D	D	D	D	D	D	D	D	D	D	D	D	D	D	D	D	D	D	D	D	D	D	D	D	D
GAC	D	D	D	D	D	D	D	D	D	D	D	D	D	D	D	D	D	D	D	D	D	D	D	D	D	D	D	D	D	D	D
GAA	E	E	E	E	E	E	E	E	E	E	E	E	E	E	E	E	E	E	E	E	E	E	E	E	E	E	E	E	E	E	E
GAG	E	E	E	E	E	E	E	E	E	E	E	E	E	E	E	E	E	E	E	E	E	E	E	E	E	E	E	E	E	E	E
GGT	G	G	G	G	G	G	G	G	G	G	G	G	G	G	G	G	G	G	G	G	G	G	G	G	G	G	G	G	G	G	G
GGC	G	G	G	G	G	G	G	G	G	G	G	G	G	G	G	G	G	G	G	G	G	G	G	G	G	G	G	G	G	G	G
GGA	G	G	G	G	G	G	G	G	G	G	G	G	G	G	G	G	G	G	G	G	G	G	G	G	G	G	G	G	G	G	G
GGG	G	G	G	G	G	G	G	G	G	G	G	G	G	G	G	G	G	G	G	G	G	G	G	G	G	G	G	G	G	G	G

== Notes ==
Three translation tables have a peculiar status:

- Table 7 is now merged into translation table 4.
- Table 8 is merged to table 1; all plant chloroplast differences due to RNA edit.

The list of genetic codes provided by NCBI does not take into account the "special" two proteinogenic amino acids:

- Selenocysteine (Sec or U), which requires a rather complicated translation machinery to insert involving a special elongation factor and the mRNA SECIS element. See Selenoprotein § Production.
- Pyrrolysine (Pyl or O), which requires no special machinery to insert so long as Pyl-tRNA^{Pyl} is available. As a result, it can and has appeared in proteins through neutral missense mutations. Indeed, Pyl is so widespread among some lineages of archaea that their genetic code can be said to be a new "Pyl code".

Other mechanisms also play a part in protein biosynthesis, such as post-transcriptional modification.

== See also ==
- Genetic codes: list of alternative codons
