= Chlorophycean mitochondrial code =

Mitochondrial genetic code in some green algae

The chlorophycean mitochondrial code (translation table 16) is a genetic code found in the mitochondria of Chlorophyceae.

== Code ==
AAs = FFLLSSSSYY*LCC*WLLLLPPPPHHQQRRRRIIIMTTTTNNKKSSRRVVVVAAAADDEEGGGG
Starts = -----------------------------------M----------------------------
Base1 = TTTTTTTTTTTTTTTTCCCCCCCCCCCCCCCCAAAAAAAAAAAAAAAAGGGGGGGGGGGGGGGG
Base2 = TTTTCCCCAAAAGGGGTTTTCCCCAAAAGGGGTTTTCCCCAAAAGGGGTTTTCCCCAAAAGGGG
Base3 = TCAGTCAGTCAGTCAGTCAGTCAGTCAGTCAGTCAGTCAGTCAGTCAGTCAGTCAGTCAGTCAG

Bases: adenine (A), cytosine (C), guanine (G) and thymine (T) or uracil (U).

Amino acids: Alanine (Ala, A), Arginine (Arg, R), Asparagine (Asn, N), Aspartic acid (Asp, D), Cysteine (Cys, C), Glutamic acid (Glu, E), Glutamine (Gln, Q), Glycine (Gly, G), Histidine (His, H), Isoleucine (Ile, I), Leucine (Leu, L), Lysine (Lys, K), Methionine (Met, M), Phenylalanine (Phe, F), Proline (Pro, P), Serine (Ser, S), Threonine (Thr, T), Tryptophan (Trp, W), Tyrosine (Tyr, Y), Valine (Val, V)

== Differences from the standard code ==
DNA codons	RNA codons	This code (16)	Standard code (1)
TAG	UAG	Leu (L)	STOP = Ter (*)

== Systematic range and comments ==
Chlorophyceae and the chytridiomycete fungus Spizellomyces punctatus.

== See also ==
- List of genetic codes
