= Ascidian mitochondrial code =

Mitochondrial genetic code in tunicates

The ascidian mitochondrial code (translation table 13) is a genetic code found in the mitochondria of Ascidiacea.

== Code ==
AAs = FFLLSSSSYY**CCWWLLLLPPPPHHQQRRRRIIMMTTTTNNKKSSGGVVVVAAAADDEEGGGG
Starts = ---M------------------------------MM---------------M------------
Base1 = TTTTTTTTTTTTTTTTCCCCCCCCCCCCCCCCAAAAAAAAAAAAAAAAGGGGGGGGGGGGGGGG
Base2 = TTTTCCCCAAAAGGGGTTTTCCCCAAAAGGGGTTTTCCCCAAAAGGGGTTTTCCCCAAAAGGGG
Base3 = TCAGTCAGTCAGTCAGTCAGTCAGTCAGTCAGTCAGTCAGTCAGTCAGTCAGTCAGTCAGTCAG

Bases: adenine (A), cytosine (C), guanine (G) and thymine (T) or uracil (U).

Amino acids: Alanine (Ala, A), Arginine (Arg, R), Asparagine (Asn, N), Aspartic acid (Asp, D), Cysteine (Cys, C), Glutamic acid (Glu, E), Glutamine (Gln, Q), Glycine (Gly, G), Histidine (His, H), Isoleucine (Ile, I), Leucine (Leu, L), Lysine (Lys, K), Methionine (Met, M), Phenylalanine (Phe, F), Proline (Pro, P), Serine (Ser, S), Threonine (Thr, T), Tryptophan (Trp, W), Tyrosine (Tyr, Y), Valine (Val, V)

== Differences from the standard code ==
DNA codons	RNA codons	This code (13)	Standard code (1)
AGA	AGA	Gly (G)	Arg (R)
AGG	AGG	Gly (G)	Arg (R)
ATA	AUA	Met (M)	Ile (I)
TGA	UGA	Trp (W)	STOP = Ter (*)

== Systematic range and comments ==
There is evidence from a phylogenetically diverse sample of tunicates (Urochordata) that AGA and AGG code for glycine. In other organisms, AGA/AGG code for either arginine or serine and in vertebrate mitochondria they code a STOP. Evidence for glycine translation of AGA/AGG was first found in 1993 in Pyura stolonifera and Halocynthia roretzi. It was then confirmed by tRNA sequencing and sequencing whole mitochondrial genomes.

== Alternative initiation codons ==
- ATA, GTG and TTG
- ATT is the start codon for the CytB gene in Halocynthia roretzi.

== See also ==
- List of genetic codes
