= Trematode mitochondrial code =

Mitochondrial genetic code in trematodes

The trematode mitochondrial code (translation table 21) is a genetic code found in the mitochondria of Trematoda.

== Code ==
AAs = FFLLSSSSYY**CCWWLLLLPPPPHHQQRRRRIIMMTTTTNNNKSSSSVVVVAAAADDEEGGGG
Starts = -----------------------------------M---------------M------------
Base1 = TTTTTTTTTTTTTTTTCCCCCCCCCCCCCCCCAAAAAAAAAAAAAAAAGGGGGGGGGGGGGGGG
Base2 = TTTTCCCCAAAAGGGGTTTTCCCCAAAAGGGGTTTTCCCCAAAAGGGGTTTTCCCCAAAAGGGG
Base3 = TCAGTCAGTCAGTCAGTCAGTCAGTCAGTCAGTCAGTCAGTCAGTCAGTCAGTCAGTCAGTCAG

Bases: adenine (A), cytosine (C), guanine (G) and thymine (T) or uracil (U).

Amino acids: Alanine (Ala, A), Arginine (Arg, R), Asparagine (Asn, N), Aspartic acid (Asp, D), Cysteine (Cys, C), Glutamic acid (Glu, E), Glutamine (Gln, Q), Glycine (Gly, G), Histidine (His, H), Isoleucine (Ile, I), Leucine (Leu, L), Lysine (Lys, K), Methionine (Met, M), Phenylalanine (Phe, F), Proline (Pro, P), Serine (Ser, S), Threonine (Thr, T), Tryptophan (Trp, W), Tyrosine (Tyr, Y), Valine (Val, V)

== Differences from the standard code ==
DNA codons	RNA codons	This code (21)	Standard code (1)
TGA	UGA	Trp (W)	STOP = Ter (*)
ATA	AUA	Met (M)	Ile (I)
AGA	AGA	Ser (S)	Arg (R)
AGG	AGG	Ser (S)	Arg (R)
AAA	AAA	Asn (N)	Lys (K)

== Systematic range and comments ==
- Trematoda

== See also ==
- List of genetic codes
