= Enterosoma genetic code =

Genetic code found in ferns

The Enterosoma genetic code (tentative code number 34) translates AGG to methionine, as determined by the codon assignment software Codetta; it was further shown that this recoding is associated with a special tRNA with the appropriate anticodon and tRNA identity elements. The code is found in a small clade of species within the Candidatus "Enterosoma" (UBA7642) genus, according to the GTDB taxonomy system release 220. Codetta called the Enterosoma code for the following genome assemblies: GCA_002431755.1, GCA_002439645.1, GCA_002436825.1, GCA_002451385.1, GCA_002297105.1, GCA_002297045.1, GCA_002404995.1, and GCA_900549915.1.

| Expected code (standard 1) | FFLLSSSSYY**CC*WLLLLPPPPHHQQRRRRIIIMTTTTNNKKSSRRVVVVAAAADDEEGGGG |
| Codetta-inferred code | FFLLSSSSYY??CC?WLLLLPPPPHHQQRRRRIIIMTTTTNNKKSSRMVVVVAAAADDEEGGGG |

== See also ==
- Genetic codes: list of alternative codons
- List of genetic codes
