= Echinoderm and flatworm mitochondrial code =

Alternative genetic code

The echinoderm and flatworm mitochondrial code (translation table 9) is a genetic code used by the mitochondria of certain echinoderm and flatworm species.

== The code ==
AAs = FFLLSSSSYY**CCWWLLLLPPPPHHQQRRRRIIIMTTTTNNNKSSSSVVVVAAAADDEEGGGG
Starts = -----------------------------------M---------------M------------
Base1 = TTTTTTTTTTTTTTTTCCCCCCCCCCCCCCCCAAAAAAAAAAAAAAAAGGGGGGGGGGGGGGGG
Base2 = TTTTCCCCAAAAGGGGTTTTCCCCAAAAGGGGTTTTCCCCAAAAGGGGTTTTCCCCAAAAGGGG
Base3 = TCAGTCAGTCAGTCAGTCAGTCAGTCAGTCAGTCAGTCAGTCAGTCAGTCAGTCAGTCAGTCAG

Bases: adenine (A), cytosine (C), guanine (G) and thymine (T) or uracil (U).

Amino acids: Alanine (Ala, A), Arginine (Arg, R), Asparagine (Asn, N), Aspartic acid (Asp, D), Cysteine (Cys, C), Glutamic acid (Glu, E), Glutamine (Gln, Q), Glycine (Gly, G), Histidine (His, H), Isoleucine (Ile, I), Leucine (Leu, L), Lysine (Lys, K), Methionine (Met, M), Phenylalanine (Phe, F), Proline (Pro, P), Serine (Ser, S), Threonine (Thr, T), Tryptophan (Trp, W), Tyrosine (Tyr, Y), Valine (Val, V)

== Differences from the standard code ==
DNA codons	RNA codons	This code (9)	Standard code (1)
AAA	AAA	Asn (N)	Lys (K)
AGA	AGA	Ser (S)	Arg (R)
AGG	AGG	Ser (S)	Arg (R)
TGA	UGA	Trp (W)	STOP = Ter (*)

== Systematic range ==
- Asterozoa (starfishes)
- Echinozoa (sea urchins)
- Rhabditophora among the Platyhelminthes

== See also ==
- List of genetic codes
