= Genetic codes (database) =

Biodatabase of genetic codes

Content
- Description: Genetic codes

Contact
- Laboratory: National Center for Biotechnology Information
- Primary citation: PMID 21177655

Access
- Data format: ASN.1
- Website: https://www.ncbi.nlm.nih.gov/Taxonomy/Utils/wprintgc.cgi
- Download URL: ASN.1 (gc.prt)

Genetic codes is a simple ASN.1 database hosted by the National Center for Biotechnology Information and listing many known Genetic codes.

Full contents of the database are available at DNA and RNA codon tables (for an overview) and List of genetic codes. The data format is described as List of genetic codes § Data format.

== See also ==
- Genetic code
