= Start codon =

First codon of a messenger RNA translated by a ribosome

Start codon (blue circle) of the human mitochondrial DNA MT-ATP6 gene. For each nucleotide triplet (square brackets), the corresponding amino acid is given (one-letter code), either in the +1 reading frame for MT-ATP8 (in red) or in the +3 frame for MT-ATP6 (in blue). In this genomic region, the two genes overlap.

The start codon is the first codon of a messenger RNA (mRNA) transcript translated by a ribosome. The start codon always codes for methionine in eukaryotes and archaea and N-formylmethionine (fMet) in bacteria, mitochondria and plastids.

The start codon is often preceded by a 5' untranslated region (5' UTR). In prokaryotes this includes the ribosome binding site.

== Decoding ==
In all three domains of life, the start codon is decoded by a special "initiation" transfer RNA different from the tRNAs used for elongation. There are important structural differences between an initiating tRNA and an elongating one, with distinguish features serving to satisfy the constraints of the translation system. In bacteria and organelles, an acceptor stem C1:A72 mismatch guide formylation, which directs recruitment by the 30S ribosome into the P site; so-called "3GC" base pairs allow assembly into the 70S ribosome. In eukaryotes and archaea, the T stem prevents the elongation factors from binding, while eIF2 specifically recognizes the attached methionine and a A1:U72 basepair.

In any case, the natural initiating tRNA only codes for methionine. Knowledge of the key recognizing features has allowed researchers to construct alternative initiating tRNAs that code for different amino acids; see below.

== Alternative start codons ==
Alternative start codons are different from the standard AUG codon and are found in both prokaryotes (bacteria and archaea) and eukaryotes. Alternate start codons are still translated as Met when they are at the start of a protein (even if the codon encodes a different amino acid otherwise). This is because a separate tRNA is used for initiation.

=== Eukaryotes ===
Alternate start codons (non-AUG) are very rare in eukaryotic genomes: a wide range of mechanisms work to guarantee the relative fidelity of AUG initiation. However, naturally occurring non-AUG start codons have been reported for some cellular mRNAs. Seven out of the nine possible single-nucleotide substitutions at the AUG start codon of dihydrofolate reductase are functional as translation start sites in mammalian cells. In all cases, methionine was inserted as the first amino acid.

=== Bacteria ===
Bacteria do not generally have the wide range of translation factors monitoring start codon fidelity. GUG and UUG are the main, even "canonical", alternate start codons. GUG in particular is important to controlling the replication of plasmids.

E. coli uses 83% AUG (3542/4284), 14% (612) GUG, 3% (103) UUG and one or two others (e.g., an AUU and possibly a CUG).

Well-known coding regions that do not have AUG initiation codons are those of lacI (GUG) and lacA (UUG) in the E. coli lac operon. Two more recent studies have independently shown that between 10 and 46 non-AUG start codons may initiate translation in E. coli. However, the codons AUG, GUG, and UUG show much higher efficiency as start codons compared to the rest of the codons.

=== Mitochondria ===
Mitochondrial genomes use alternate start codons more significantly (AUA and AUG in humans). Many such examples, with codons, systematic range, and citations, are given in the NCBI list of translation tables.

=== Archaea ===
Archaea, which are prokaryotes with a translation machinery similar to but simpler than that of eukaryotes, allow initiation at UUG and GUG.

== Upstream start codons ==
These are "alternative" start codons in the sense that they are upstream of the regular start codons and thus could be used as alternative start codons. More than half of all human mRNAs have at least one AUG codon upstream (uAUG) of their annotated translation initiation starts (TIS) (58% in the current versions of the human RefSeq sequence). Their potential use as TISs could result in translation of so-called upstream Open Reading Frames (uORFs). uORF translation usually results in the synthesis of short polypeptides, some of which have been shown to be functional, e.g., in ASNSD1, MIEF1, MKKS, and SLC35A4. However, it is believed that most translated uORFs only have a mild inhibitory effect on downstream translation because most uORF starts are leaky (i.e. don't initiate translation or because ribosomes terminating after translation of short ORFs are often capable of reinitiating).

== Standard genetic code ==
Amino-acid biochemical properties	Nonpolar	Polar	Basic	Acidic	Termination: stop codon

Standard genetic code (NCBI table 1)
1st base	2nd base								3rd base
1st base	U		C		A		G		3rd base
U	UUU	(Phe/F) Phenylalanine	UCU	(Ser/S) Serine	UAU	(Tyr/Y) Tyrosine	UGU	(Cys/C) Cysteine	U
U	UUC	(Phe/F) Phenylalanine	UCC	(Ser/S) Serine	UAC	(Tyr/Y) Tyrosine	UGC	(Cys/C) Cysteine	C
U	UUA	(Leu/L) Leucine	UCA	(Ser/S) Serine	UAA	Stop (Ochre)^{[B]}	UGA	Stop (Opal)^{[B]}	A
U	UUG^{[A]}	(Leu/L) Leucine	UCG	(Ser/S) Serine	UAG	Stop (Amber)^{[B]}	UGG	(Trp/W) Tryptophan	G
C	CUU	(Leu/L) Leucine	CCU	(Pro/P) Proline	CAU	(His/H) Histidine	CGU	(Arg/R) Arginine	U
C	CUC	(Leu/L) Leucine	CCC	(Pro/P) Proline	CAC	(His/H) Histidine	CGC	(Arg/R) Arginine	C
C	CUA	(Leu/L) Leucine	CCA	(Pro/P) Proline	CAA	(Gln/Q) Glutamine	CGA	(Arg/R) Arginine	A
C	CUG	(Leu/L) Leucine	CCG	(Pro/P) Proline	CAG	(Gln/Q) Glutamine	CGG	(Arg/R) Arginine	G
A	AUU	(Ile/I) Isoleucine	ACU	(Thr/T) Threonine	AAU	(Asn/N) Asparagine	AGU	(Ser/S) Serine	U
A	AUC	(Ile/I) Isoleucine	ACC	(Thr/T) Threonine	AAC	(Asn/N) Asparagine	AGC	(Ser/S) Serine	C
A	AUA	(Ile/I) Isoleucine	ACA	(Thr/T) Threonine	AAA	(Lys/K) Lysine	AGA	(Arg/R) Arginine	A
A	AUG^{[A]}	(Met/M) Methionine	ACG	(Thr/T) Threonine	AAG	(Lys/K) Lysine	AGG	(Arg/R) Arginine	G
G	GUU	(Val/V) Valine	GCU	(Ala/A) Alanine	GAU	(Asp/D) Aspartic acid	GGU	(Gly/G) Glycine	U
G	GUC	(Val/V) Valine	GCC	(Ala/A) Alanine	GAC	(Asp/D) Aspartic acid	GGC	(Gly/G) Glycine	C
G	GUA	(Val/V) Valine	GCA	(Ala/A) Alanine	GAA	(Glu/E) Glutamic acid	GGA	(Gly/G) Glycine	A
G	GUG^{[A]}	(Val/V) Valine	GCG	(Ala/A) Alanine	GAG	(Glu/E) Glutamic acid	GGG	(Gly/G) Glycine	G

^{A} Possible start codons in NCBI table 1. AUG is most common. The two other start codons listed by table 1 (GUG and UUG) are rare in eukaryotes. Prokaryotes have less strigent start codon requirements; they are described by NCBI table 11.
^{B} The historical basis for designating the stop codons as amber, ochre and opal is described in an autobiography by Sydney Brenner and in a historical article by Bob Edgar.

== Non-methionine start codons ==
=== Natural ===
Translation started by an internal ribosome entry site (IRES), which bypasses a number of regular eukaryotic initiation systems, can have a non-methinone start with GCU or CAA codons.

Mammalian cells can initiate translation with leucine using a specific leucyl-tRNA that decodes the codon CUG. This mechanism is independent of eIF2. No secondary structure similar to that of an IRES is needed. It proceeds by ribosomal scanning, and a Kozak context enhances initiation efficiency.

=== Engineered start codons ===
Engineered initiator tRNA (tRNA^{fMet}_{CUA}, changed from a MetY tRNA^{fMet}_{CAU}) have been used to initiate translation at the amber stop codon UAG in E. coli. Initiation with this tRNA not only inserts the traditional formylmethionine, but also formylglutamine, as glutamyl-tRNA synthase also recognizes the new tRNA. (Recall from above that the bacterial translation initiation system does not specifically check for methionine, only the formyl modification). One study has shown that the amber initiator tRNA does not initiate translation to any measurable degree from genomically-encoded UAG codons, only plasmid-borne reporters with strong upstream Shine-Dalgarno sites.

== See also ==
- Central dogma of molecular biology
- Codon
- Messenger RNA
- Missense mRNA
- Stop codon
- Transfer RNA
- Translation
