= List of pterobranch genera =

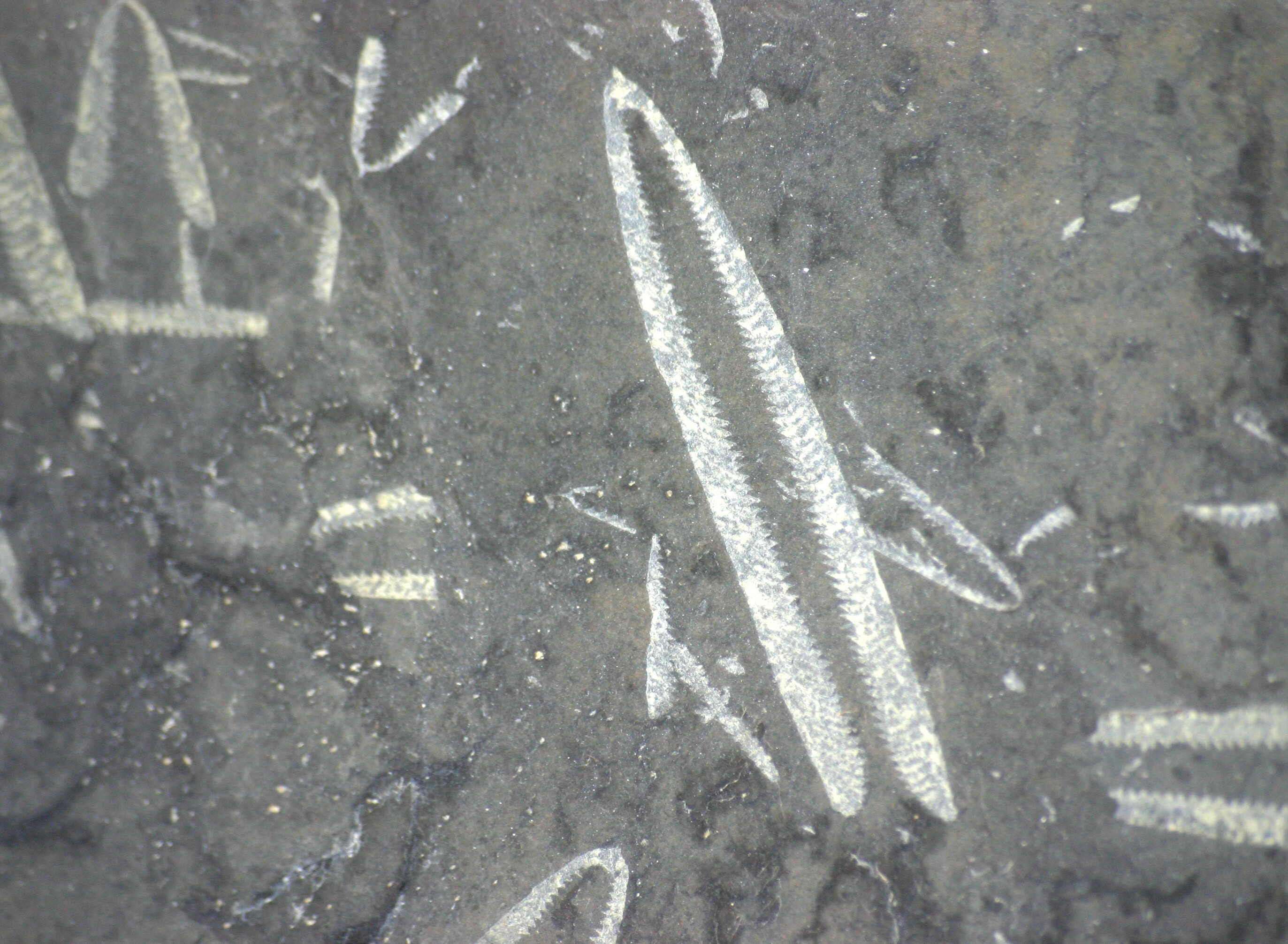
Didymograptus

This list of graptolites is an attempt to create a comprehensive listing of all genera from the fossil record that have ever been considered to be members of Pterobranchia (including Graptolithina), excluding purely vernacular terms. The list includes all commonly accepted genera, but also genera that are now considered invalid, doubtful (nomina dubia), as well as junior synonyms of more established names, and genera that are no longer considered pterobranchs.

The list below is based on the genera listed in Maletz (2014).

== Naming conventions and terminology ==
Naming conventions and terminology follow the International Code of Zoological Nomenclature. Technical terms used include:

- Junior synonym: A name which describes the same taxon as a previously published name. If two or more genera are formally designated and the type specimens are later assigned to the same genus, the first to be published (in chronological order) is the senior synonym, and all other instances are junior synonyms. Senior synonyms are generally used, except if they are homonyms, or by special decision of the ICZN, but junior synonyms cannot be used again, even if deprecated. Junior synonymy is often subjective, unless the genera described were both based on the same type specimen.
- Nomen nudum (Latin for "naked name"): A name that has appeared in print but has not yet been formally published by the standards of the ICZN. Nomina nuda (the plural form) are unavailable, and are therefore not italicized as an available generic name would be. If the name is later formally published, that name is no longer a nomen nudum and will appear, italicized, on this list. Sometimes, the formally published name will differ from any nomina nuda that describe the same specimen.
- Homonym: A name that is formally published, but which has already been used for another taxon. This second use is invalid (as are all subsequent uses) and the name must be replaced. These are listed in parentheses below after the valid name.
- Nomen dubium (Latin for "dubious name"): A name describing a fossil with no unique diagnostic features. As this can be an extremely subjective and controversial designation, this term is not used on this list.

== List ==
Genus	Family	Authority
Acoelothecia	Cephalodiscidae	John, 1931
Aellograptus	Cephalodiscidae	Obut, 1964
Atubaria	Cephalodiscidae	Sato, 1936
Cephalodiscus	Cephalodiscidae	M’Intosh, 1882
Demiothecia	Cephalodiscidae	Ridewood, 1906
Eocephalodiscus	Cephalodiscidae	Kozłowski, 1949
Idiothecia	Cephalodiscidae	Lankester, 1906 in Ridewood (1906)
Melanostrophus	Cephalodiscidae	Öpik, 1930
Orthoecus	Cephalodiscidae	Andersson, 1907
Pterobranchites	Cephalodiscidae	Kozłowski, 1967
?Archaeocryptolaria	Rhabdopleuridae	Chapman, 1919
Calyxhydra	Rhabdopleuridae	Kozłowski, 1959
Chitinodendron	Rhabdopleuridae	Eisenack, 1937
Cylindrohydra	Rhabdopleuridae	Kozłowski, 1959
Diplohydra	Rhabdopleuridae	Kozłowski, 1949
Eorhabdopleura	Rhabdopleuridae	Kozłowski, 1970
Epigraptus	Rhabdopleuridae	Eisenack, 1941
Fasciculitubus	Rhabdopleuridae	Obut & Sobolevskaya, 1967
Graptovermis	Rhabdopleuridae	Kozłowski, 1949
Haliolophus	Rhabdopleuridae	Sars, 1868
?Haplograptus	Rhabdopleuridae	Ruedemann, 1933
Idiotubus	Rhabdopleuridae	Kozłowski, 1949
Kystodendron	Rhabdopleuridae	Kozłowski, 1959
Lagenohydra	Rhabdopleuridae	Kozłowski, 1959
?Malongitubus	Rhabdopleuridae	Hu, 2005
Palaeokylix	Rhabdopleuridae	Eisenack, 1932
Palaeotuba	Rhabdopleuridae	Eisenack, 1934
Rhabdopleura	Rhabdopleuridae	Allman, 1869 in Norman (1869)
Rhabdopleurites	Rhabdopleuridae	Kozłowski, 1967
Rhabdopleuroides	Rhabdopleuridae	Kozłowski, 1961
Rhabdotubus	Rhabdopleuridae	Bengtson & Urbanek, 1986
?Sphenoecium	Rhabdopleuridae	Chapman & Thomas, 1936
Stolonodendrum	Rhabdopleuridae	Kozłowski, 1949a
Xenotheca	Rhabdopleuridae	Eisenack, 1937
?Yuknessia	Rhabdopleuridae	Walcott, 1919
Bithecocamara	Cysticamaridae	Kozłowski, 1949
Cysticamara	Cysticamaridae	Kozłowski, 1949
Erecticamara	Cysticamaridae	Mierzejewski, 2000
Flexicollicamara	Cysticamaridae	Kozłowski, 1949
Graptocamara	Cysticamaridae	Kozłowski, 1949
Syringataenia	Cysticamaridae	Obut, 1953
Tubicamara	Cysticamaridae	Kozłowski, 1949
Bulmanicrusta	Wimanicrustidae	Kozłowski, 1962
Ellesicrusta	Wimanicrustidae	Kozłowski, 1962
Graptoblastoides	Wimanicrustidae	Kozłowski, 1949
Graptoblastus	Wimanicrustidae	Kozłowski, 1949
Holmicrusta	Wimanicrustidae	Kozłowski, 1962
Hormograptus (= Thallograptus Öpik)	Wimanicrustidae	Öpik, 1930
Lapworthicrusta	Wimanicrustidae	Kozłowski, 1962
Maenniligraptus	Wimanicrustidae	Mierzejewski, 1986b
Ruedemannicrusta	Wimanicrustidae	Kozłowski, 1962
Urbanekicrusta	Wimanicrustidae	Mierzejewski, 1986b
Wimanicrusta	Wimanicrustidae	Kozłowski, 1962
Xenocyathus	Wimanicrustidae	Eisenack, 1982
Archaeolafoea	Dithecodendridae	Chapman, 1919
Bulmanidendrum	Dithecodendridae	Obut, 1974
?Dalyia	Dithecodendridae	Walcott, 1919
Dithecodendrum	Dithecodendridae	Obut, 1964
Karasidendrum	Dithecodendridae	Sennikov, 1998
Ovetograptus	Dithecodendridae	Sdzuy, 1974
Protodendrum	Dithecodendridae	Sennikov, 1998
Siberiodendrum	Dithecodendridae	Obut, 1964
Siberiograptus	Dithecodendridae	Obut, 1964
Sotograptus	Dithecodendridae	Sdzuy, 1974
Tarnagraptus	Dithecodendridae	Sdzuy, 1974
?Alternograptus	Cyclograptidae	Bouček, 1956
?Callodendrograptus	Cyclograptidae	Decker, 1945
Calycotubus	Cyclograptidae	Kozłowski, 1949
Camarotubus	Cyclograptidae	Mierzejewski, 2001
Conitubus	Cyclograptidae	Kozłowski, 1949
Cyclograptus	Cyclograptidae	Spencer, 1883
Dendrotubus	Cyclograptidae	Kozłowski, 1949
Discograptus	Cyclograptidae	Wiman, 1901
Dyadograptus	Cyclograptidae	Obut, 1960
Galeograptus	Cyclograptidae	Wiman, 1901
Kozlowskitubus	Cyclograptidae	Mierzejewski, 1978
Marsipograptus	Cyclograptidae	Ruedemann, 1936
Multitubus	Cyclograptidae	Skevington, 1963
Parvitubus	Cyclograptidae	Skevington, 1963
Reticulograptus	Cyclograptidae	Wiman, 1901
Rhiphidodendrum	Cyclograptidae	Kozłowski, 1949
Rodonograptus	Cyclograptidae	Počta, 1894
Siberiodendrum	Cyclograptidae	Obut, 1964
Syrriphidograptus	Cyclograptidae	Poulsen, 1924
Tubidendrum	Cyclograptidae	Kozłowski, 1949
Airograptus	Dendrograptidae	Ruedemann, 1916
Aspidograptus	Dendrograptidae	Bulman, 1934
?Cactograptus	Dendrograptidae	Ruedemann, 1908
Callograptus	Dendrograptidae	Hall, 1865
Calyxdendrum	Dendrograptidae	Kozłowski, 1960
Capillograptus	Dendrograptidae	Bouček, 1957
Dendrograptus	Dendrograptidae	Hall, 1858
Denticulograptus	Dendrograptidae	Schmidt, 1939
Desmograptus	Dendrograptidae	Hopkinson in Hopkinson & Lapworth, 1875
Dictyonema	Dendrograptidae	Hall, 1851
Graptolodendrum	Dendrograptidae	Kozłowski, 1966
Licnograptus	Dendrograptidae	Ruedemann, 1947
Odontocaulis	Dendrograptidae	Lapworth, 1881
Ophigraptus	Dendrograptidae	Jaeger, 1992
Ophiograptus	Dendrograptidae	Poulsen, 1937
Pseudocallograptus	Dendrograptidae	Skevington, 1963
Pseudodictyonema	Dendrograptidae	Bouček, 1957
Ptilograptus	Dendrograptidae	Hall, 1865
Ptiograptus	Dendrograptidae	Ruedemann, 1908
Rhabdinopora	Dendrograptidae	Paškevičius, 2011
Rhizograpsus	Dendrograptidae	Spencer, 1878
Ruedemannograptus (= Streptograptus Ruedemann)	Dendrograptidae	Termier & Termier, 1948
Stelechiocladia	Dendrograptidae	Počta, 1894
Zigzagigraptus	Dendrograptidae	Yu, 1962
Acanthograpsus	Acanthograptidae	Spencer, 1878
Archaeodictyota	Acanthograptidae	Obut & Sobolevskaya, 1967
Boiophyton	Acanthograptidae	Obrhel, 1959
Coremagraptus	Acanthograptidae	Bulman, 1942
Koremagraptus	Acanthograptidae	Bulman, 1927b
Palaeodictyota	Acanthograptidae	Whitfield, 1902
Saxonia	Acanthograptidae	Roselt, 1962
Trimerohydra	Acanthograptidae	Kozłowski, 1959
Mastigograptus	Mastigograptidae	Ruedemann, 1908
Micrograptus	Mastigograptidae	Eisenack, 1974
Adelograptus	Anisograptidae	Bulman, 1941
Aletograptus	Anisograptidae	Obut & Sobolevskaya, 1962
Ancoragraptus	Anisograptidae	Jackson & Lenz, 2003
Anisograptus	Anisograptidae	Ruedemann, 1937
Aorograptus	Anisograptidae	Williams & Stevens, 1991
Araneograptus	Anisograptidae	Erdtmann & VandenBerg, 1985
Bryograptus	Anisograptidae	Lapworth, 1880
Chigraptus	Anisograptidae	Jackson & Lenz, 1999
Choristograptus	Anisograptidae	Legrand, 1964
Damesograptus	Anisograptidae	Jahn, 1892
Dictyodendron	Anisograptidae	Westergård, 1909
Dictyograptus	Anisograptidae	Hopkinson, 1875 in Hopkinson & Lapworth (1875)
Diphygraptus	Anisograptidae	Zhao & Zhang, 1985
Graptopora	Anisograptidae	Salter, 1858
Heterograptus	Anisograptidae	Zhao & Zhang in Lin, 1986
Holopsigraptus	Anisograptidae	Zhao & Zhang, 1985
Hunjiangograptus	Anisograptidae	Zhao & Zhang, 1985
Hunnegraptus	Anisograptidae	Lindholm, 1991
Kiaerograptus	Anisograptidae	Spjeldnaes, 1963
Muenzhigraptus	Anisograptidae	Zhao & Zhang, 1985
Neoclonograptus	Anisograptidae	Zhao & Zhang, 1985
?Nephelograptus	Anisograptidae	Ruedemann, 1947
Paraclonograptus	Anisograptidae	Zhao & Zhang, 1985
Paratemnograptus	Anisograptidae	Williams & Stevens, 1991
Phyllograpta	Anisograptidae	Angelin, 1854
Psigraptus	Anisograptidae	Jackson, 1967
Radiograptus	Anisograptidae	Bulman, 1950
Rhabdinopora	Anisograptidae	Eichwald, 1855
Sagenograptus	Anisograptidae	Obut & Sobolevskaya, 1962
Staurograpsus	Anisograptidae	Emmons, 1855
?Stellatograptus	Anisograptidae	Erdtmann, 1967
Toyenograptus	Anisograptidae	Li, 1984
Triograptus	Anisograptidae	Monsen, 1925
Triramograptus	Anisograptidae	Erdtmann, 1998 in Cooper et al. (1998)
Yukonograptus	Anisograptidae	Lin, 1981
Acrograptus	Sigmagraptidae	Tzaj, 1969
Azygograptus	Sigmagraptidae	Nicholson & Lapworth, 1875 in Nicholson (1875)
Eoazygograptus	Sigmagraptidae	Obut & Sennikov, 1984
Eotetragraptus	Sigmagraptidae	Bouček & Přibyl, 1951
Etagraptus	Sigmagraptidae	Ruedemann, 1904
Goniograptus	Sigmagraptidae	M’Coy, 1876
Hemigoniograptus	Sigmagraptidae	Jin & Wang, 1977
Jiangnanograptus	Sigmagraptidae	Xiao & Chen, 1990
Jishougraptus	Sigmagraptidae	Ge, 1988
Keblograptus	Sigmagraptidae	Riva, 1992
Kinnegraptus	Sigmagraptidae	Skoglund, 1961
Laxograptus	Sigmagraptidae	Cooper & Fortey, 1982
Maeandrograptus	Sigmagraptidae	Moberg, 1892
Metazygograptus	Sigmagraptidae	Obut & Sennikov, 1984
Oslograptus	Sigmagraptidae	Jaanusson, 1965
Paradelograptus	Sigmagraptidae	Erdtmann, Maletz & Gutiérrez-Marco, 1987
Paraulograptus	Sigmagraptidae	Bouček, 1973
Pendeosalicograptus	Sigmagraptidae	Jiao, 1981
Perissograptus	Sigmagraptidae	Williams & Stevens, 1988
Praegoniograptus	Sigmagraptidae	Rickards & Chapman, 1991
Prokinnegraptus	Sigmagraptidae	Mu, 1974
Sigmagraptus	Sigmagraptidae	Ruedemann, 1904
Taishanograptus	Sigmagraptidae	Li & Ge, 1987 in Li, Ge & Chen (1987)
Trichograptus	Sigmagraptidae	Nicholson, 1876
Wuninograptus	Sigmagraptidae	Ni, 1981
Yushanograptus	Sigmagraptidae	Chen, Sun & Han, 1964
Allograptus	Sinograptidae	Mu, 1957
Anomalograptus	Sinograptidae	Clark, 1924
Atopograptus	Sinograptidae	Harris, 1926
Brachiograptus	Sinograptidae	Harris & Keble, 1932
Hemiholmograptus	Sinograptidae	Hsü & Chao, 1976
Holmograptus	Sinograptidae	Kozłowski, 1954
Nicholsonograptus	Sinograptidae	Bouček & Přibyl, 1951
Paradidymograptus	Sinograptidae	Mu, Geh & Yin, 1962 in Mu et al. (1962)
Pseudodichograptus	Sinograptidae	Chu, 1965
Pseudojanograptus	Sinograptidae	Hsü & Chao, 1976
Pseudologanograptus	Sinograptidae	Hsü & Chao, 1976
Pseudotetragraptus	Sinograptidae	Hsü & Chao, 1976
Sinazygograptus	Sinograptidae	Wang & Wu, 1977 in Wang & Jin (1977)
Sinograptus	Sinograptidae	Mu, 1957
Tylograptus	Sinograptidae	Mu, 1957
Zygograptus	Sinograptidae	Harris & Thomas, 1941
Abrograptus	Abrograptidae	Mu, 1958
Dinemagraptus	Abrograptidae	Kozłowski, 1951
Jiangshanites	Abrograptidae	Mu & Qiao, 1962
Metabrograptus	Abrograptidae	Strachan, 1990
Parabrograptus	Abrograptidae	Mu & Qiao, 1962
Anthograptus	Dichograptidae	Törnquist, 1904
Calamograptus	Dichograptidae	Clark, 1924
Clonograpsus	Dichograptidae	Nicholson, 1873
Ctenograptus	Dichograptidae	Nicholson, 1876
Dichograptus	Dichograptidae	Salter, 1863
Hermannograptus	Dichograptidae	Monsen, 1937
Holograptus	Dichograptidae	Holm, 1881a
Kellamograptus	Dichograptidae	Rickards & Chapman, 1991
Kstaugraptus	Dichograptidae	Tzaj, 1973
Loganograptus	Dichograptidae	Hall, 1868
Mimograptus	Dichograptidae	Harris & Thomas, 1940
Orthodichograptus	Dichograptidae	Thomas, 1972
Rouvilligraptus	Dichograptidae	Barrois, 1893
Schizograptus	Dichograptidae	Nicholson, 1876
Temnograptus	Dichograptidae	Nicholson, 1876
Triaenograptus	Dichograptidae	Hall, 1914
Tridensigraptus	Dichograptidae	Zhao, 1964
Trochograptus	Dichograptidae	Holm, 1881a
Aulograptus	Didymograptidae	Skevington, 1965
Baltograptus	Didymograptidae	Maletz, 1994
Cladograpsus	Didymograptidae	Geinitz, 1852
Cymatograptus	Didymograptidae	Jaanusson, 1965
Didymograptus	Didymograptidae	M’Coy, 1851 in Sedgwick & M’Coy (1851)
Expansograptus	Didymograptidae	Bouček & Přibyl, 1951
Janograptus	Didymograptidae	Tullberg, 1880
Jenkinsograptus	Didymograptidae	Gutiérrez-Marco, 1986
Parazygograptus	Didymograptidae	Kozłowski, 1954
Trigonograpsus	Didymograptidae	Nicholson, 1869
Didymograptellus	Pterograptidae	Cooper & Fortey, 1982
Pseudobryograptus	Pterograptidae	Mu, 1957
Pterograptus	Pterograptidae	Holm, 1881b
Xiphograptus	Pterograptidae	Cooper & Fortey, 1982
Yutagraptus	Pterograptidae	Riva, 1994
Corymbograptus	Tetragraptidae	Obut & Sobolevskaya, 1964
Paratetragraptus	Tetragraptidae	Obut, 1957
Pendeograptus	Tetragraptidae	Bouček & Přibyl, 1951
Phyllograptus	Tetragraptidae	Hall, 1858
Pseudophyllograptus	Tetragraptidae	Cooper & Fortey, 1982
Pseudotrigonograptus	Tetragraptidae	Mu & Lee, 1958
Tetragrapsus	Tetragraptidae	Salter, 1863
Tristichograptus	Tetragraptidae	Jackson & Bulman, 1970
Arienigraptus	Isograptidae	Yu & Fang, 1981
Cardiograptus	Isograptidae	Harris & Keble, 1916 in Harris (1916)
Isograptus	Isograptidae	Moberg, 1892
Oncograptus	Isograptidae	Hall, 1914
Paracardiograptus	Isograptidae	Mu & Lee, 1958
Parisograptus	Isograptidae	Chen & Zhang, 1996
Procardiograptus	Isograptidae	Xiao, Xia & Wang 1985
Proncograptus	Isograptidae	Xiao, Xia & Wang, 1985
Pseudisograptus	Isograptidae	Beavis, 1972
Xiushuigraptus	Isograptidae	Yu & Fang, 1983
Apoglossograptus	Glossograptidae	Finney, 1978
Bergstroemograptus	Glossograptidae	Finney & Chen, 1984
Corynites	Glossograptidae	Kozłowski, 1956
Corynograptus	Glossograptidae	Hopkinson & Lapworth, 1875
Corynoides	Glossograptidae	Nicholson, 1867
Cryptograptus	Glossograptidae	Lapworth, 1880f
Glossograpsus	Glossograptidae	Emmons, 1855
Kalpinograptus	Glossograptidae	Jiao, 1977
Lonchograptus	Glossograptidae	Tullberg, 1880
Mimograptus	Glossograptidae	Lapworth, 1908 in Elles & Wood (1908)
Nanograptus	Glossograptidae	Hadding, 1915
Paraglossograptus	Glossograptidae	Mu in Hsü, 1959
Rogercooperia	Glossograptidae	Sherwin & Rickards, 2000
Sinoretiograptus	Glossograptidae	Mu et al., 1974
Skiagraptus	Glossograptidae	Harris, 1933
Tonograptus	Glossograptidae	Williams, 1992
Apiograptus	Diplograptidae, Subfamily Diplograptinae	Cooper & McLaurin, 1974
Archiclimacograptus	Diplograptidae, Subfamily Diplograptinae	Mitchell, 1987
Diplograpsis	Diplograptidae, Subfamily Diplograptinae	M’Coy, 1850
Eoglyptograptus	Diplograptidae, Subfamily Diplograptinae	Mitchell, 1987
Exigraptus	Diplograptidae, Subfamily Diplograptinae	Mu, 1979 in Mu et al. (1979)
Fenhshiangograptus	Diplograptidae, Subfamily Diplograptinae	Hong, 1957
Levisograptus	Diplograptidae, Subfamily Diplograptinae	Maletz 2011
Mesograptus	Diplograptidae, Subfamily Diplograptinae	Elles & Wood, 1907
Oepikograptus	Diplograptidae, Subfamily Diplograptinae	Obut, 1987
Prorectograptus	Diplograptidae, Subfamily Diplograptinae	Li, 1994
Pseudamplexograptus	Diplograptidae, Subfamily Diplograptinae	Mitchell, 1987
Urbanekograptus	Diplograptidae, Subfamily Diplograptinae	Mitchell, 1987
Amplexograptus	Diplograptidae, Subfamily Orthograptinae	Elles & Wood, 1907
Anticostia	Diplograptidae, Subfamily Orthograptinae	Stewart & Mitchell, 1997
Arnheimograptus	Diplograptidae, Subfamily Orthograptinae	Mitchell, 1987
Ceramograptus	Diplograptidae, Subfamily Orthograptinae	Hudson, 1915
Geniculograptus	Diplograptidae, Subfamily Orthograptinae	Mitchell, 1987
Hustedograptus	Diplograptidae, Subfamily Orthograptinae	Mitchell, 1987
Orthograptus	Diplograptidae, Subfamily Orthograptinae	Lapworth, 1873
Orthoretiograptus	Diplograptidae, Subfamily Orthograptinae	Mu, 1977 in Wang & Jin (1977)
Pacificograptus	Diplograptidae, Subfamily Orthograptinae	Koren’, 1979
Paraorthograptus	Diplograptidae, Subfamily Orthograptinae	Mu et al., 1974
Pararetiograptus	Diplograptidae, Subfamily Orthograptinae	Mu et al., 1974
Peiragraptus	Diplograptidae, Subfamily Orthograptinae	Strachan, 1954
Pseudoreteograptus	Diplograptidae, Subfamily Orthograptinae	Mu, 1993 in Mu et al. (1993)
Rectograptus	Diplograptidae, Subfamily Orthograptinae	Přibyl, 1949
Uticagraptus	Diplograptidae, Subfamily Orthograptinae	Riva, 1987
Arachniograptus	Lasiograptidae	Ross & Berry, 1963
Archiretiolites	Lasiograptidae	Eisenack, 1935
Brevigraptus	Lasiograptidae	Mitchell, 1988
Hallograptus	Lasiograptidae	Lapworth, 1876a
Lasiograptus	Lasiograptidae	Lapworth, 1873
Neurograptus	Lasiograptidae	Elles & Wood, 1908
Nymphograptus	Lasiograptidae	Elles & Wood, 1908
Orthoretiolites	Lasiograptidae	Whittington, 1954
Paraplegmatograptus	Lasiograptidae	Mu & Lin, 1984
Phormograptus	Lasiograptidae	Whittington, 1955
Pipiograptus	Lasiograptidae	Whittington, 1955
Plegmatograptus	Lasiograptidae	Elles & Wood, 1908
Sunigraptus	Lasiograptidae	Mu, 1993 in Mu et al. (1993)
Tysanograptus	Lasiograptidae	Elles & Wood, 1908
Yangzigraptus	Lasiograptidae	Mu, 1983 in Yang et al. (1983)
Yinograptus	Lasiograptidae	Mu, 1962 in Mu & Chen (1962)
Appendispinograptus	Climacograptidae	Li & Li, 1985
Clathrograptus	Climacograptidae	Lapworth, 1873
Climacograptus	Climacograptidae	Hall, 1865
Diplacanthograptus	Climacograptidae	Mitchell, 1987
Euclimacograptus	Climacograptidae	Riva, 1989 in Riva & Ketner (1989)
Gymnograptus	Climacograptidae	Bulman, 1953
Haddingograptus	Climacograptidae	Maletz, 1997
Idiograptus	Climacograptidae	Lapworth, 1880
Leptothecalograptus	Climacograptidae	Li, 2002 in Mu et al. (2002)
Mendograptus	Climacograptidae	Rusconi 1948
Notograptus	Climacograptidae	Rusconi 1948
Oelandograptus	Climacograptidae	Mitchell, 1987
Proclimacograptus	Climacograptidae	Maletz, 1997
Prolasiograptus	Climacograptidae	Lee, 1963
Pseudoclimacograptus	Climacograptidae	Přibyl, 1947
Reteograptus	Climacograptidae	Hall, 1859 (= Retiograptus Hall, 1865)
Styracograptus	Climacograptidae	Štorch et al., 2011
Undulograptus	Climacograptidae	Bouček, 1973
Aclistograptus	Dicranograptidae, Subfamily Dicranograptinae	Ge, 2002 in Mu et al. (2002)
Amphigraptus	Dicranograptidae, Subfamily Dicranograptinae	Lapworth, 1873
Clematograptus	Dicranograptidae, Subfamily Dicranograptinae	Hopkinson, 1875 in Hopkinson & Lapworth (1875)
Deflexigraptus	Dicranograptidae, Subfamily Dicranograptinae	Mu, 2002 in Mu et al. (2002)
Dicaulograptus	Dicranograptidae, Subfamily Dicranograptinae	Rickards & Bulman, 1965
Dicellograpsus	Dicranograptidae, Subfamily Dicranograptinae	Hopkinson, 1871
Diceratograptus	Dicranograptidae, Subfamily Dicranograptinae	Mu, 1963
Dicranograptus (= Cladograpsus Emmons)	Dicranograptidae, Subfamily Dicranograptinae	Hall, 1865
Incumbograptus	Dicranograptidae, Subfamily Dicranograptinae	Ge, 2002 in Mu et al. (2002)
Jiangxigraptus	Dicranograptidae, Subfamily Dicranograptinae	Yu & Fang, 1966
Leptograptus	Dicranograptidae, Subfamily Dicranograptinae	Lapworth, 1873
Ningxiagraptus	Dicranograptidae, Subfamily Dicranograptinae	Ge, 2002 in Mu et al. (2002)
Pseudazygograptus	Dicranograptidae, Subfamily Dicranograptinae	Mu, Lee & Geh, 1960
Syndyograptus	Dicranograptidae, Subfamily Dicranograptinae	Ruedemann, 1908
Tangyagraptus	Dicranograptidae, Subfamily Dicranograptinae	Mu, 1963
Coenograptus	Dicranograptidae, Subfamily Nemagraptinae	Hall, 1868
Geitonograptus	Dicranograptidae, Subfamily Nemagraptinae	Obut & Zubtzov, 1964
Helicograpsus	Dicranograptidae, Subfamily Nemagraptinae	Nicholson, 1868
Nemagrapsus	Dicranograptidae, Subfamily Nemagraptinae	Emmons, 1855
Ordosograptus	Dicranograptidae, Subfamily Nemagraptinae	Lin, 1980
Pleurograpsus	Dicranograptidae, Subfamily Nemagraptinae	Nicholson, 1867
Stephanograptus	Dicranograptidae, Subfamily Nemagraptinae	Geinitz, 1866
Clinoclimacograptus	Normalograptidae	Bulman & Rickards, 1968
Cystograptus	Normalograptidae	Hundt, 1942
Hedrograptus	Normalograptidae	Obut, 1949
?Hirsutograptus	Normalograptidae	Koren’ & Rickards, 1996
?Limpidograptus	Normalograptidae	Khaletskaya, 1962
Lithuanograptus	Normalograptidae	Paskevicius, 1976
Metaclimacograptus	Normalograptidae	Bulman & Rickards, 1968
Neodicellograptus	Normalograptidae	Mu & Wang, 1977 in Wang & Jin (1977)
Neoglyptograptus	Normalograptidae	Rickards et al. 1995
Normalograptus	Normalograptidae	Legrand, 1987
Pseudoglyptograptus	Normalograptidae	Bulman & Rickards, 1968
Retioclimacis	Normalograptidae	Mu et al., 1974
Rhaphidograptus	Normalograptidae	Bulman, 1936
Scalarigraptus	Normalograptidae	Riva, 1988
Sichuanograptus	Normalograptidae	Zhao, 1976
Skanegraptus	Normalograptidae	Maletz, 2011c
Talacastograptus	Normalograptidae	Cuerda, Rickards & Cingolani, 1988
Korenograptus	Neodiplograptidae, Subfamily Neodiplograptinae	Melchin et al., 2011
Metabolograptus	Neodiplograptidae, Subfamily Neodiplograptinae	Obut & Sennikov, 1985
Neodiplograptus	Neodiplograptidae, Subfamily Neodiplograptinae	Legrand, 1987
Paraclimacograptus	Neodiplograptidae, Subfamily Neodiplograptinae	Přibyl, 1948b
Persculptograptus	Neodiplograptidae, Subfamily Neodiplograptinae	Koren’ & Rickards, 1996
Rickardsograptus	Neodiplograptidae, Subfamily Neodiplograptinae	Melchin et al., 2011
Agetograptus	Neodiplograptidae, Subfamily Petalolithinae	Obut & Sobolevskaya in Obut et al., 1968
Cephalograpsus	Neodiplograptidae, Subfamily Petalolithinae	Hopkinson, 1869
Comograptus	Neodiplograptidae, Subfamily Petalolithinae	Obut & Sobolevskaya, 1968 in Obut et al. (1968)
Corbograptus	Neodiplograptidae, Subfamily Petalolithinae	Koren’ & Rickards, 1996
Demicystifer	Neodiplograptidae, Subfamily Petalolithinae	Hundt, 1959
?Demicystograptus	Neodiplograptidae, Subfamily Petalolithinae	Hundt, 1950
Dimorphograptoides	Neodiplograptidae, Subfamily Petalolithinae	Koren’ & Rickards, 1996
Dittograptus	Neodiplograptidae, Subfamily Petalolithinae	Obut & Sobolevskaya, 1968 in Obut et al. (1968)
Glyptograptus	Neodiplograptidae, Subfamily Petalolithinae	Lapworth, 1873
Hercograptus	Neodiplograptidae, Subfamily Petalolithinae	Melchin, 1999
Paramplexograptus	Neodiplograptidae, Subfamily Petalolithinae	Melchin et al., 2011
Parapetalolithus (= Diprion Barrande)	Neodiplograptidae, Subfamily Petalolithinae	Koren’ & Rickards, 1996
Petalograptus	Neodiplograptidae, Subfamily Petalolithinae	Suess, 1851
Petalolithus	Neodiplograptidae, Subfamily Petalolithinae	Suess, 1851
Pseudorthograptus	Neodiplograptidae, Subfamily Petalolithinae	Legrand, 1987
Rivagraptus	Neodiplograptidae, Subfamily Petalolithinae	Koren’ & Rickards, 1996
Songxigraptus	Neodiplograptidae, Subfamily Petalolithinae	Fang, Liang & Yu, 1990
Spinadiplograptus	Neodiplograptidae, Subfamily Petalolithinae	Hundt, 1965
Sudburigraptus	Neodiplograptidae, Subfamily Petalolithinae	Koren’ & Rickards, 1996
Victorograptus	Neodiplograptidae, Subfamily Petalolithinae	Koren’ & Rickards, 1996
Dabashanograptus	Retiolitidae, Subfamily Retiolitinae	Ge, 1990
Dimykterograptus	Retiolitidae, Subfamily Retiolitinae	Haberfelner, 1936
Eiseligraptus	Retiolitidae, Subfamily Retiolitinae	Hundt, 1965
Eorograptus	Retiolitidae, Subfamily Retiolitinae	Sennikov, 1984
Gladiograptus	Retiolitidae, Subfamily Retiolitinae	Lapworth, 1875 in Hopkinson & Lapworth (1875)
Gladiolites	Retiolitidae, Subfamily Retiolitinae	Barrande, 1850
Pileograptus	Retiolitidae, Subfamily Retiolitinae	Lenz & Kozłowska, 2007
Pseudoplegmatograptus	Retiolitidae, Subfamily Retiolitinae	Přibyl, 1948b
Pseudoretiolites	Retiolitidae, Subfamily Retiolitinae	Bouček & Münch, 1944
Retiolites	Retiolitidae, Subfamily Retiolitinae	Barrande, 1850
Rotaretiolites	Retiolitidae, Subfamily Retiolitinae	Bates & Kirk, 1992
Sinostomatograptus	Retiolitidae, Subfamily Retiolitinae	Huo, 1957
Stomatograptus	Retiolitidae, Subfamily Retiolitinae	Tullberg, 1883
Tscharyschograptus	Retiolitidae, Subfamily Retiolitinae	Sennikov, 1984
Agastograptus	Retiolitidae, Subfamily Plectograptinae	Obut & Zaslavskaya, 1983
Baculograptus	Retiolitidae, Subfamily Plectograptinae	Lenz & Kozłowska-Dawidziuk, 2002
Balticograptus	Retiolitidae, Subfamily Plectograptinae	Bouček & Münch, 1952
Cometograptus	Retiolitidae, Subfamily Plectograptinae	Kozłowska-Dawidziuk, 2001
Doliograptus	Retiolitidae, Subfamily Plectograptinae	Lenz & Kozłowska-Dawidziuk, 2002
Eisenackograptus	Retiolitidae, Subfamily Plectograptinae	Kozłowska-Dawidziuk, 1990
Giganteograptus	Retiolitidae, Subfamily Plectograptinae	Lenz & Kozłowska, 2007
Gothograptus	Retiolitidae, Subfamily Plectograptinae	Frech, 1897
Holoretiolites	Retiolitidae, Subfamily Plectograptinae	Eisenack, 1951
Kirkigraptus	Retiolitidae, Subfamily Plectograptinae	Kozłowska & Bates, 2008
Mirorgraptus	Retiolitidae, Subfamily Plectograptinae	Lenz & Kozłowska, 2007
Neogothograptus	Retiolitidae, Subfamily Plectograptinae	Kozłowska-Dawidziuk, 1995
Papiliograptus	Retiolitidae, Subfamily Plectograptinae	Lenz & Kozłowska, 2002
Paraplectograptus	Retiolitidae, Subfamily Plectograptinae	Přibyl, 1948a
Plectodinemagraptus	Retiolitidae, Subfamily Plectograptinae	Kozłowska-Dawidziuk, 1995
Plectograptus	Retiolitidae, Subfamily Plectograptinae	Moberg & Törnquist, 1909
Pseudoplectograptus	Retiolitidae, Subfamily Plectograptinae	Obut & Zaslavskaya, 1983
Quattuorgraptus	Retiolitidae, Subfamily Plectograptinae	Dobrowolska, 2013
Reticuloplectograptus	Retiolitidae, Subfamily Plectograptinae	Kozłowska, Bates & Piras, 2010
Sagenograptoides	Retiolitidae, Subfamily Plectograptinae	Lenz & Kozłowska, 2010
Sagenograptus	Retiolitidae, Subfamily Plectograptinae	Lenz & Kozłowska-Dawidziuk, 2001
Semiplectograptus	Retiolitidae, Subfamily Plectograptinae	Kozłowska-Dawidziuk, 1995
Sokolovograptus	Retiolitidae, Subfamily Plectograptinae	Obut & Zaslavskaya, 1976
Spinograptus	Retiolitidae, Subfamily Plectograptinae	Bouček & Münch, 1952
Valentinagraptus	Retiolitidae, Subfamily Plectograptinae	Piras, 2006
Akidograptus	Dimorphograptidae	Davies, 1929
Avitograptus	Dimorphograptidae	Melchin et al., 2011
Bulmanograptus	Dimorphograptidae	Přibyl, 1948b
Cardograptus	Dimorphograptidae	Hundt, 1965
Dimorphograptus	Dimorphograptidae	Lapworth, 1876b
Metadimorphograptus	Dimorphograptidae	Přibyl, 1948b
Parakidograptus	Dimorphograptidae	Li & Ge, 1981
Abiesgraptus	Monograptidae	Hundt, 1935
Acanthograptus	Monograptidae	Tsegelniuk, 1976
Alexandrograptus	Monograptidae	Přibyl, 1981
Atavograptus	Monograptidae	Rickards, 1974
Averianowograptus	Monograptidae	Obut, 1949
Awarograptus	Monograptidae	Zalasiewicz & Howe, 2003
Barrandeograptus	Monograptidae	Bouček, 1933
Bohemograptus	Monograptidae	Přibyl, 1967a
Bugograptus	Monograptidae	Tsegelniuk, 1976
Campograptus	Monograptidae	Obut, 1949
Cochlograptus	Monograptidae	Obut, 1987
Colonograptus	Monograptidae	Přibyl, 1942
Coronograptus	Monograptidae	Obut & Sobolevskaya, 1968 in Obut et al. (1968)
Corymbites	Monograptidae	Obut & Sobolevskaya, 1967 in Obut et al. (1967)
Crinitograptus	Monograptidae	Rickards, 1995
Cucullograptus	Monograptidae	Urbanek, 1954
Cultellograptus	Monograptidae	Loydell & Nestor, 2006
Cyrtograptus (= Cyrtograpsus Carruthers)	Monograptidae	Lapworth, 1873
Damosiograptus	Monograptidae	Obut, 1950
Demirastrites	Monograptidae	Eisel, 1912
Dibranchiograptus	Monograptidae	Hundt, 1949
Didymograptoides	Monograptidae	Hundt, 1951
Diversograptus	Monograptidae	Manck, 1923
Dulebograptus	Monograptidae	Tsegelniuk, 1976
Egregiograptus	Monograptidae	Rickards & Wright, 1997
Enigmagraptus	Monograptidae	Rickards & Wright, 2004
Euroclimacis	Monograptidae	Štorch, 1998a
Falcatograptus	Monograptidae	Hundt, 1965
Formosograptus	Monograptidae	Bouček et al., 1976
Fterograptus	Monograptidae	Tsegelniuk, 1976
Gangliograptus	Monograptidae	Hundt, 1939
Globosograptus	Monograptidae	Bouček & Přibyl, 1948 in Přibyl (1948a)
Heisograptus	Monograptidae	Tsegelniuk, 1976
Hemimonograptus	Monograptidae	Zhao 1984
Hubeigraptus	Monograptidae	Li, 1995
Huttagraptus	Monograptidae	Koren’ & Bjerreskov, 1997
Istrograptus	Monograptidae	Tsegelniuk, 1976
Korenea	Monograptidae	Rickards et al., 1995
Kurganakograptus	Monograptidae	Golikov, 1969
Lagarograptus	Monograptidae	Obut & Sobolevskaya, 1968 in Obut et al. (1968)
Lapworthograptus	Monograptidae	Bouček & Přibyl, 1952
Lenzograptus (= Lenzia Rickards & Wright)	Monograptidae	Loydell, 2020
Linograptus	Monograptidae	Frech, 1897
Lituigraptus	Monograptidae	Ni, 1978
Lobograptus	Monograptidae	Urbanek, 1958
Lomatoceras	Monograptidae	Bronn, 1835
Mediograptus	Monograptidae	Bouček & Přibyl, 1948 in Přibyl (1948a)
Metamonograptus	Monograptidae	Wang, 1977
Monoclimacis	Monograptidae	Frech, 1897
Monograpsus	Monograptidae	Geinitz, 1852
Monoprion	Monograptidae	Barrande, 1850
Mystiograptus	Monograptidae	Hundt, 1965
Neocolonograptus	Monograptidae	Urbanek, 1997
Neocucullograptus	Monograptidae	Urbanek, 1970
Neodiversograptus	Monograptidae	Urbanek, 1963
Neolagarograptus	Monograptidae	Štorch, 1998b
Neolobograptus	Monograptidae	Urbanek, 1970
Neomonograptus	Monograptidae	Mu & Ni, 1973
Obutograptus	Monograptidae	Mu, 1955
Oktavites	Monograptidae	Levina, 1928
Paradiversograptus	Monograptidae	Sennikov, 1976
Paragraptus	Monograptidae	Hundt, 1965
Paramonoclimacis	Monograptidae	Wang & Ma, 1977 in Wang & Jin (1977)
Pernerograptus	Monograptidae	Přibyl, 1941
Polonograptus	Monograptidae	Tsegelniuk, 1976
Pomatograptus	Monograptidae	Jaekel, 1889
Přibylograptus	Monograptidae	Obut & Sobolevskaya, 1966
Pristiograptus	Monograptidae	Jaekel, 1889
Prochnygraptus	Monograptidae	Přibyl & Štorch, 1985
Procyrtograptus	Monograptidae	Poulsen, 1943
Prolinograptus	Monograptidae	Rickards & Wright, 1997
Proteograptus	Monograptidae	Lenz et al., 2012
Pseudomonoclimacis	Monograptidae	Mikhailova, 1975
Pseudostreptograptus	Monograptidae	Loydell, 1991a
Quasipernerograptus	Monograptidae	Zhao, 1984
Rastrites	Monograptidae	Barrande, 1850
Rastrograptus	Monograptidae	Hopkinson & Lapworth, 1875
Saetograptus	Monograptidae	Přibyl, 1942
Sinodiversograptus	Monograptidae	Mu & Chen, 1962
Skalograptus	Monograptidae	Tsegelniuk, 1976
Slovinograptus	Monograptidae	Urbanek, 1997
Spirograptus	Monograptidae	Gürich, 1908
Stavrites	Monograptidae	Obut & Sobolevskaya, 1968 in Obut et al. (1968)
Stimulograptus	Monograptidae	Přibyl & Štorch, 1983
Streptograptus	Monograptidae	Yin, 1937
Tamplograptus	Monograptidae	Tsegelniuk, 1976
Testograptus	Monograptidae	Přibyl, 1967b
Thuringiograptus	Monograptidae	Hundt, 1935
Tirassograptus	Monograptidae	Tsegelniuk, 1976
Torquigraptus	Monograptidae	Loydell, 1993
Trimorphograptus	Monograptidae	Zhao, 1984
Tyrsograptus	Monograptidae	Obut, 1949
Uncinatograptus	Monograptidae	Tsegelniuk, 1976
Uralograptus	Monograptidae	Koren’, 1962
Urbanekia	Monograptidae	Rickards & Wright, 1999
?Vietnamograptus	Monograptidae	van Phuc, 1998
Wandograptus	Monograptidae	Rickards & Jell, 2002
Wolynograptus	Monograptidae	Tsegelniuk, 1976

== See also ==
- List of prehistoric brittle stars
- List of prehistoric sea cucumbers
- List of crinoid genera
