= List of the prehistoric life of Washington =

== Precambrian ==
The Paleobiology Database records no known occurrences of Precambrian fossils in Washington.

== Paleozoic ==
=== Brachiopoda ===
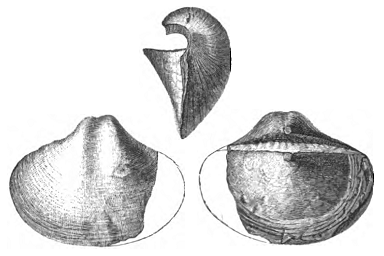
Kutorgina fossil (illustration)

- †Acrothele
  - †Acrothele sp.
- †Kutorgina
  - Cf. †Kutorgina cingulata
  - †Kutorgina sp.
- †Leptobolus
  - †Leptobolus sp.
  - Cf. †Rustella edsoni
- †Micromitra
  - †Micromitra sp.
- †Paterina
  - †Paterina sp.

=== Bryozoa ===
- †Alternifenestella
  - †Alternifenestella vagrantia – type locality for species
- †Coeloclemis
  - †Coeloclemis urhausenii – type locality for species
- †Dybowskiella
  - †Dybowskiella sp.
- †Dyscritella
  - †Dyscritella iwaizakiensis
- †Dyscritellina
  - †Dyscritellina sp.
- †?Fistulamina
  - †?Fistulamina sp.
- †Fistulipora
  - †Fistulipora sp.
- †Fistuliramus
  - †Fistuliramus pacificus – type locality for species
- †Hayasakapora
  - Cf. †Hayasakapora erectoradiata
- †Mackinneyella
  - †Mackinneyella stylettia – type locality for species
- †Meekoporella
  - †Meekoporella inflecta – type locality for species
- †Nematopora
  - †Nematopora sp.
- †Neoeridotrypella
  - †Neoeridotrypella missionensis – type locality for species
- †Pamirella
  - †Pamirella oculus – type locality for species
- †Parapolypora
  - †Parapolypora sp.
- †Pinegopora
  - †Pinegopora petita – type locality for species
- †Polypora
  - †Polypora arbusca – type locality for species
- †Polyporella
  - †Polyporella sp.
- †Pseudobatostomella
  - †Pseudobatostomella sp.
- †?Rhombopora
  - †?Rhombopora sp.
- †Rhombotrypella
  - †Rhombotrypella kettlensis – type locality for species
- †Sakagamiina – type locality for genus
  - †Sakagamiina easternensis – type locality for species
- †Stenopora
  - †Stenopora sp.
- †?Streblotrypa
  - †?Streblotrypa sp.
- †Tabulipora
  - †Tabulipora colvillensis – type locality for species
- †Wjatkella
  - †Wjatkella nanea – type locality for species

=== Conodonta ===
- †Bythocypris
  - Aff. †Bythocypris amsdenensis
- †Cavellina
  - Aff. †Cavellina coryelli
- †Graphiodactylus
  - †Graphiodactylus tenuis
- †Jonesina
  - †Jonesina craterigera
- ?†Neokloedenella
  - ?†Neokloedenella sp.
- †Paraparchites
  - †Paraparchites nicklesi
- †Parafusulina
  - †Parafusulina dunbari

=== Hyolithelmintida ===
- †Hyolithellus
  - †Hyolithellus sp.

=== Pterobranchia ===
- †Amplexograptus
  - †Amplexograptus sp.
- ?†Apiograptus
  - Cf. ?†Apiograptus crudus
- †Azygograptus
  - Cf. †Azygograptus canadensis
- †Cardiograptus
  - †Cardiograptus morsus
- †Climacograptus
  - Cf. †Climacograptus baragwanathi
  - Cf. †Climacograptus riddellensis
  - †Climacograptus sp.
- †Cryptograptus
  - Cf. †Cryptograptus antennarius
  - Cf. †Cryptograptus hopkinsoni
  - †Cryptograptus insectiformis
  - ?†Cryptograptus inutilus
  - †Cryptograptus sp.
- †Dicellograptus
  - †Dicellograptus flexuosus
- †Dichograptus
- †Dicranograptus
  - †Dicranograptus hians hians
  - Aff. †Dichograptus norvegicus
- †Didymograptus
  - Cf. †Didymograptus cognatus
  - Aff. †Didymograptus extensus
  - †Didymograptus nanus
  - †Didymograptus serratulus
  - †Didymograptus (Didymograptellus) sp.
- †Diplograptus
  - Cf. Diplograptus ingens wellingtonensis
- †Holmograptus
  - Cf. †Holmograptus lentus
  - Cf. †Holmograptus spinosus
- †Glossograptus
  - †Glossograptus ciliatus
  - †Glossograptus echinatus
- †Isograptus
  - Cf. Isograptus angulatus
  - †Isograptus caduceus
  - †Isograptus victoriae
  - Cf. Isograptus forcipiformis
  - †Isograptus sp.
- †Kalpinograptus
  - †Kalpinograptus ovatus
- ?†Kinnegraptus
  - ?†Kinnegraptus sp.
- †Loganograptus
  - †Loganograptus logani
  - †Loganograptus sp.
- †Orthograptus
  - †Orthograptus quadrimucronatus
  - †Orthograptus sp.
- †Paraglossograptus
  - †Paraglossograptus tentaculatus
- †Phyllograptus
  - †Phyllograptus ilicifolius
  - †Phyllograptus sp.
- ?†Pseudisograptus
  - ?† Aff. Pseudisograptus manubriatus koi
- †Pseudoclimacograptus
  - †Pseudoclimacograptus sp.
- †Pseudotrigonograptus
  - †Pseudotrigonograptus ensiformis
- †Pterograptus
  - †Pterograptus elegans
- †Sinograptus
  - †Sinograptus rastritoides
- †Tetragraptus
  - Cf. †Tetragraptus (Tetragraptus) bigsbyi
  - Cf. †Tetragraptus minutus
  - †Tetragraptus pendens
    - †Tetragraptus pendens liber - type locality for subspecies
  - Cf. †Tetragraptus pseudobigsbyi
  - †Tetragraptus quadribrachiatus
  - †Tetragraptus similis
  - Cf. †Tetragraptus zhejiangensis
  - †Tetragraptus (Tetragraptus) sp.
- † Thamnograptus
  - † Thamnograptus capillaris
- ?†Trichograptus
  - ?†Trichograptus sp.
- ?†Undulograptus
  - ?Cf. Undulograptus intersitus
  - ?†Undulograptus sp.
- †Xiphograptus
  - †Xiphograptus sp.
- †Zygograptus
  - ?†Zygograptus junori

=== Trilobita ===
- †Bathyuriscus
  - †Bathyuriscus sp.
- †Elrathia
  - †Elratliia kingii
  - †Elrathia longiceps
- †Kootenia
  - †Kootenia sp.
- †Nevadia
  - †Nevadia addyensis
- †Olenoides
  - †Olenoides maladensis
- †Ogygopsis
  - †Ogygopsis klotzi
- †Pagetia
  - †Pagetia sp.
- †Ptychoparella
  - †Ptychoparella cordillerae

=== Chlorophyta ===
- †Gyroporella
  - †Gyroporella igoi
  - †Gyroporella nipponica
- †Mizzia
  - †Mizzia velebitana
- †Oligoporella
  - †Oligoporella expansa
- †Vermiporella
  - †Vermiporella sp.

== Mesozoic ==
=== Animals ===
==== Ammonitida ====
- ?†Barroisiceras
  - ?†Barroisiceras sp.
- †Canadoceras
  - †Canadoceras newberryanum
  - Cf. †Canadoceras newberryanum
  - †Canadoceras sp.
- †Desmophyllites
  - †Desmophyllites diphylloides
- †Dieneroceras
  - Cf. †Dieneroceras dieneri
- †Gaudryceras
  - Cf. †Gaudryceras denmanense
- †Homolsomites
  - †Homolsomites mutabilis
  - †Homolsomites stantoni
- †Hoplitoplacenticeras
  - †Hoplitoplacenticeras vancouverense
  - †Hoplitoplacenticeras sp.
- †Hypophylloceras
  - †Hypophylloceras (Neophylloceras) ramosum
- †Juvenites
  - Cf. †Juvenites septentrionalis
- †Olcostephanus
  - Cf. †Olcostephanus pecki
- †Owenites'
  - †Owenites koeneni'
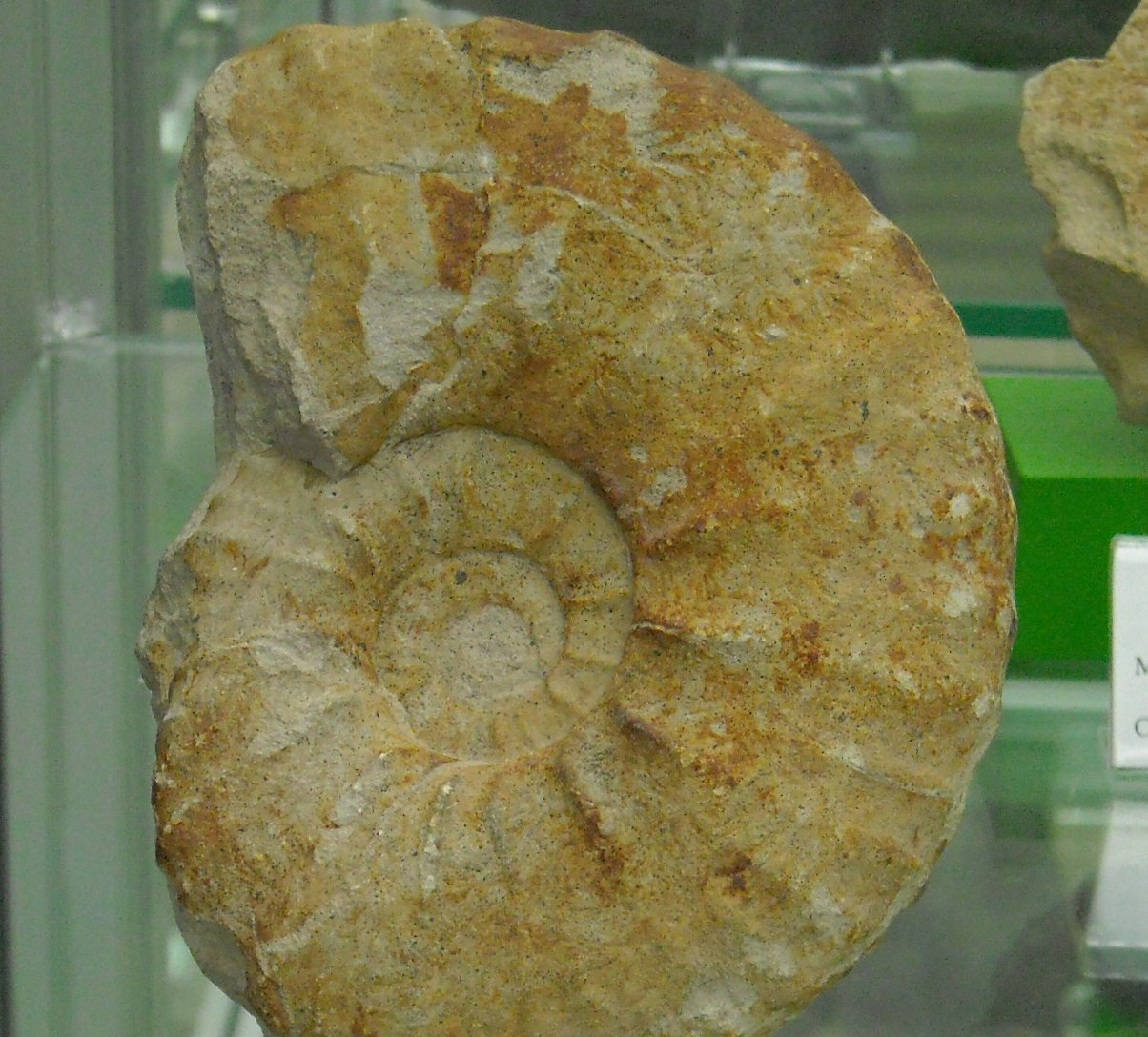
- Fossilized shell of the Late Cretaceous ammonoid cephalopod Pachydiscus
  †Pachydiscus
  - †Pachydiscus buckhami
- †Pseudoxybeloceras
  - Cf. †Pseudoxybeloceras lineatum

==== Asteroidea ====
- †Sucia – type locality for genus
  - †Sucia suavis – type locality for species

==== Bivalvia ====
- †Calva
  - †Calva bowersiana
  - †Calva haggarti - type locality for species
- †Clisocolus
  - †Clisocolus dubius
- †Cymbophora
  - †Cymbophora suciensis
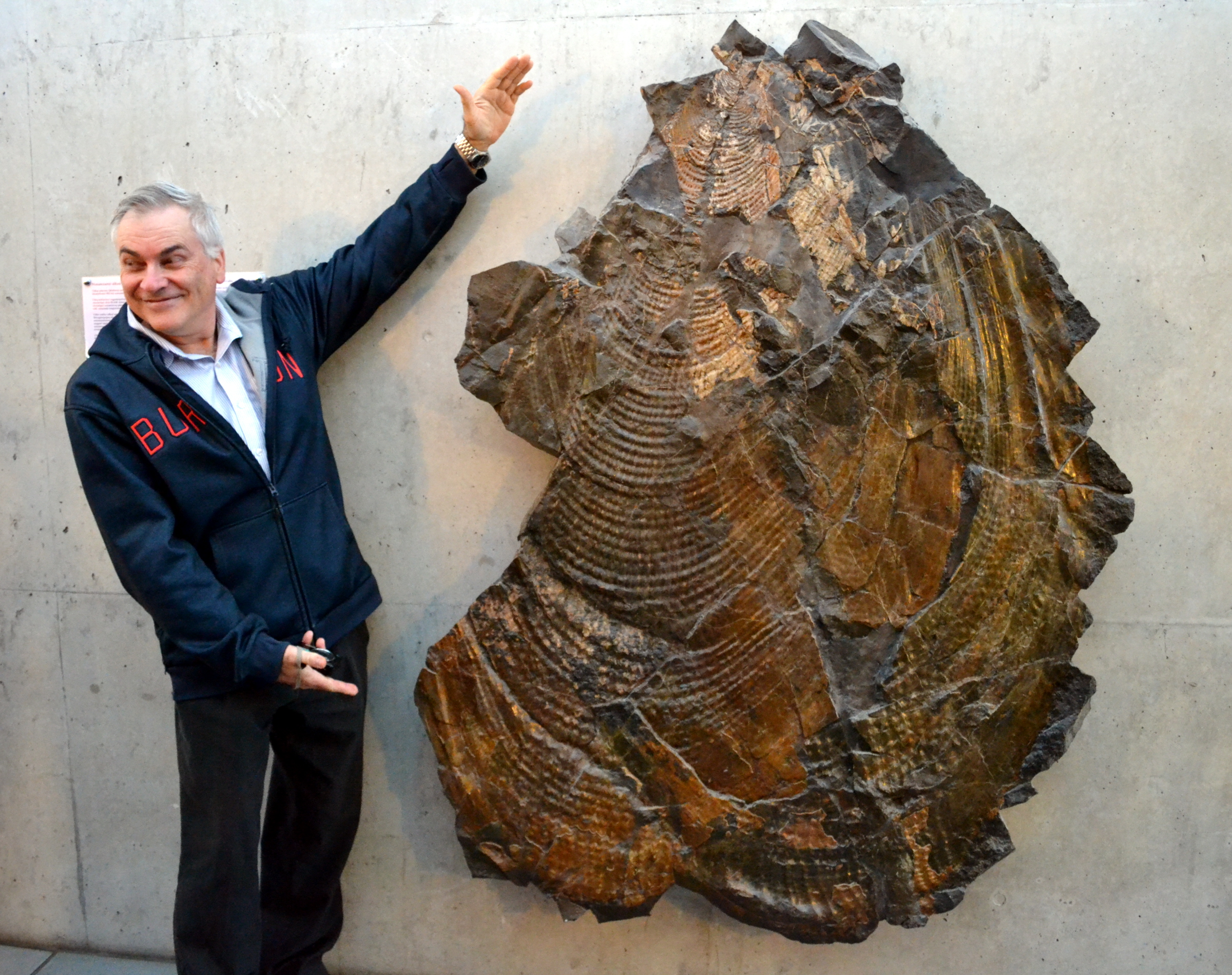
- Fossilized shell of the Early Jurassic-Late Cretaceous marine bivalve Inoceramus with a human indicating its size
  †Inoceramus
  - †Inoceramus subundatus
  - †Inoceramus vancouverensis

==== Conodonts ====
- †Epigondolella
  - †Epigondolella abneptis

==== Gastropoda ====
- †Anchura
  - †Anchura falciformis
- †Atria
  - †Atira ornatissima
- †Boggsia
  - †Boggsia tenuis
- †Forsia
  - †Forsia popenoei
- †Gyrodes
  - †Gyrodes canadensis
- Palaeocypraea
  - †Palaeocypraea suciensis – type locality for species
- †Pentzia
  - †Pentzia hilgardi
- †Perissitys
  - †Perissitys brevirostris
- ?†Pseudocymia
  - ?†Pseudocymia cahalli
- †Turritella
  - Cf. †Turritella chicoensis
- †Zinsitys
  - †Zinsitys anassa

==== Decapoda ====
- †Campanaxius - Type locality for genus
  - †Campanaxius raffi - Type locality for species

==== Vertebrata ====
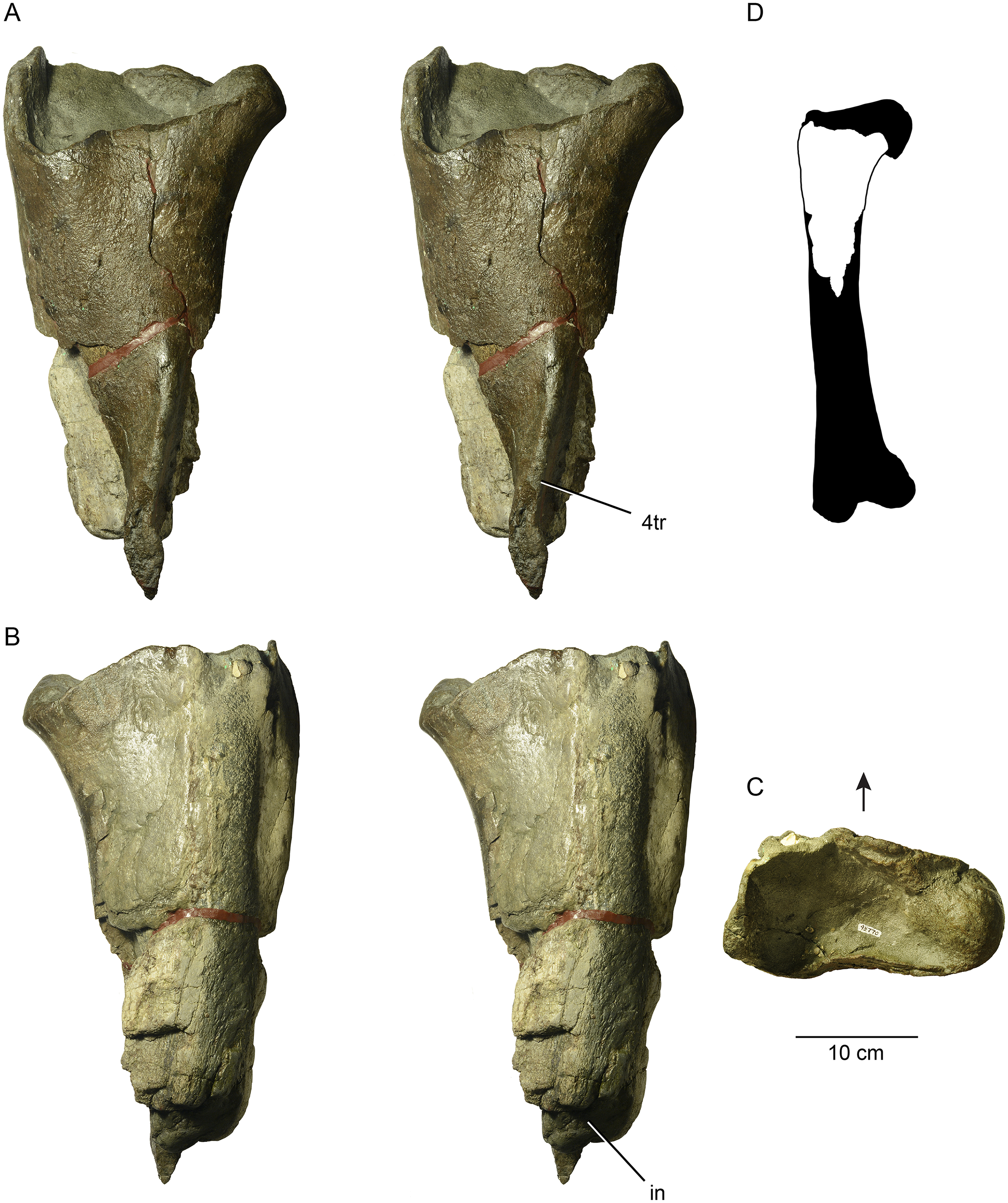
indeterminate theropod

- Indeterminate - informally named "Suciasaurus"

=== Plants ===
==== Angiosperms ====
- †Fenestracarpa – type locality for genus
  - †Fenestracarpa washingtonensis – type locality for species

==== Bennettitales ====
- †Cycadolepis
  - †Cycadolepis sp.
- †Pseudocycas
  - †Pseudocycas insignis
  - ?†Pseudocycas sp.
- †Pterophyllum
  - †Pterophyllum palmulum - Type locality for species
  - †Pterophyllum rectangulare
  - ?†Pterophyllum sp.
- †Sphenozamites
  - †Sphenozamites sp.
- †Williamsonia
  - †Williamsonia aculeata - Type locality for species
  - †Williamsonia winthropensis - Type locality for species

==== Cyatheales ====
- †Tympanophora
  - †Tympanophora simplex
  - †Tympanophora sp.

==== Cycadales ====
- †Androstrobus
  - †Androstrobus scutulatus - Type locality for species
- †Laceria - Type locality for genus
  - †Laceria pulcra - Type locality for species
- †Nilssoniocladus
  - †Nilssoniocladus corrugatus - Type locality for species
  - †Nilssoniocladus sp.
- †Orthoneura - Type locality for genus
  - †Orthoneura longissima - Type locality for species

==== Czekanowkiales ====
- †Czekanowskia
  - †Czekanowskia durabilis - Type locality for species

==== Equisetales ====
- Equisetum
  - †Equisetum sp.
- †Neocalamites
  - †Neocalamites vaganta - Type locality for species

==== Gingkophytes ====
- †Baiera
  - †Baiera sp.
- Ginkgo
  - †Ginkgo adiantoides

==== Gleicheniales ====
- †Calcaropteris - Type locality for genus
  - †Calcaropteris boeselii - Type locality for species
  - †Calcaropteris bifurcata - Type locality for species
- †Microphyllopteris
  - †Microphyllopteris gieseckiana
  - †Microphyllopteris delicata - Type locality for species
- †Paramatonia - Type locality for genus
  - †Paramatonia linearis - Type locality for species

==== Marchantiophyta ====
- †Hepaticites
  - †Hepaticites sp.

==== Osmundales ====
- †Cladophlebis
  - ↑Cladophlebis baja-beeceensis - Type locality for species
  - †Cladophlebis crenata
  - †Cladophlebis denticulata
  - †Cladophlebis impressa
  - †Cladophlebis methowensis - Type locality for species

==== Pinales ====
- Athrotaxis
  - †Athrotaxis parvistrobili - Type locality for species
- †Brachyphyllum
  - †Brachyphyllum cracenente - Type locality for species
  - †Brachyphyllum crassicaule
- †Conago - Type locality for genus
  - †Conago chartifera - Type locality for species
  - †Conago fornicata - Type locality for species
  - †Conago fornicata - Type locality for species
  - †Conago spinosa - Type locality for species
  - †Conago tonsifera - Type locality for species
- †Elatocladus
  - †Elatocladus gracilis - Type locality for species
- †Geinitzia
  - †Geinitzia dentifolia
  - †Geinitzia subtilis - Type locality for species
- †Pagiophyllum
  - †Pagiophyllum tenuifolium - Type locality for species
- †Platycladium - Type locality for genus
  - †Platycladium creberum - Type locality for species
- †Podozamites
  - †Podozamites decrescens
  - †Podozamites varifolia - Type locality for species
- †Sphenolepis
  - †Sphenolepis condita

==== Polypodiophyta - incertae sedis ====
- †Furcillopteris
  - †Furcillopteris oblongata - Type locality for species
  - †Furcillopteris serrata
- †Sectilopteris
  - †Sectilopteris latiloba
  - †Sectilopteris newberryi
  - †Sectilopteris psilotoides

==== Polypodiales ====
- †Winthropteris - Type locality for genus
  - †Winthropteris ovalis - Type locality for species

==== Pteridospermopsids ====
- †Sagenopteris
  - †Sagenopteris nilsoniana
  - †Sagenopteris panda - Type locality for species
  - †Aff. Sagenopteris williamsii

==== Plantae incertae sedis ====
- †Desmiophyllum
  - †Desmiophyllum truncatum
  - †Desmiophyllum "sp A."
  - †Desmiophyllum "sp B."
