= Diplograptina =

Diplograptina Temporal range: Dapingian-Hirnantian

Scientific classification
- Kingdom: Animalia
- Phylum: Hemichordata
- Class: Pterobranchia
- Subclass: Graptolithina
- Order: †Graptoloidea
- Suborder: †Axonophora
- Infraorder: †Diplograptina; Lapworth, 1873

Subgroups
- †Apiograptus (=†Exigraptus); †Levisograptus; †Diplograptidae; †Diplograptinae; †Peiragraptinae; †Lasiograptidae; †Climacograptidae; †Dicranograptidae; †Nemagraptinae

Extinct infraorder of animals

Diplograptina is a group of graptolites that includes the Diplograptidae, the Climacograptidae, and the Dicranograptidae.

== Phylogeny ==
This is a cladogram of Axonophora published by Charles Mitchell and colleagues, 2007. The synapomorphies labeled below branches refer to proximal astogeny patterns. Taxon names follow the Treatise of Invertebrate Paleontology.

- Axonophora U
  - Apiograptus
  - - - Levisograptus sinodentatus
      - Levisograptus austrodentatus
    - - - Levisograptus sinicus
        - Levisograptus dicellograptoides
      - C
        - Levisograptus primus
        - - "Undulograptus" marathonensis
          - - - Climacograptidae
                ⊞
                ⊟
                - - Archiclimacograptus (paraphyletic, incl. Haddingograptus)
                  - D
                    - Pseudoclimacograptus
                    - - Climacograptus (paraphyletic)
                      - E
                        - Diplacanthograptus (paraphyletic)
                        - Appendispinigraptus supernus
              - Dicranograptidae
                ⊞
                ⊟
                - Dicaulograptus
                - A
                  - Dicranograptus (paraphyletic)
                  - - Dicellograptus (paraphyletic)
                    - Nemagraptus
              - Diplograptidae
                ⊞
                ⊟
                - Pseudamplexograptus
                - - Urbanekograptus
                  - A
                    - - Hustedograptus sp. A (Mitchell)
                      - Eoglyptograptus
                    - - Lasiograptidae
                        ⊞
                        ⊟
                        - Hallograptus
                        - L
                          - Lasiograptus
                          - - Neurograptus
                            - - - Pipiograptus
                                - Brevigraptus
                              - - Orthoretiolites
                                - - Archiretiolites regimontanus
                                  - - Yinograptus
                                    - Paraplegmatograptus
                                    - - Phormograptus
                                      - Archiretiolites n. sp.
                      - - Hustedograptus teretisculus
                        - - Hustedograptus uplandicus
                          - G
                            - Orthograptus (paraphyletic)
                            - - Rectograptus
                              - - Amplexograptus
                                - - Diplograptus
                                  - - F
                                      - Gymnograptus
                                      - - Arnheimograptus
                                        - Geniculograptus
                                    - - Paraorthograptus (paraphyletic)
                                      - K
                                        - Anticostia (paraphyletic)
                                        - Pararetiograptus
            - Neograptina
              ⊞
              ⊟
              - Undulograptus (paraphyletic)
              - - Proclimacograptus? pungens
                - - Oelandograptus
                  - - Proclimacograptus
                    - H
                      Normalograptus (paraphyletic grade leading to Monograptoidea and Retiolitoidea)
