= Axonophora =

Scientific classification
- Kingdom: Animalia
- Phylum: Hemichordata
- Class: Pterobranchia
- Subclass: Graptolithina
- Order: †Graptoloidea
- Suborder: †Axonophora; Frech, 1897

Extinct suborder of graptolites

Axonophora is an extinct suborder of graptolites. It primarily consists of the biserial graptolites, and also includes the retiolitids and monograptids.

== Taxonomy ==
Taxonomy of Axonophora from Maletz (2014):

- Infraorder †Diplograptina Lapworth, 1880e
  - Family †Diplograptidae Lapworth, 1873b
    - Subfamily †Diplograptinae Lapworth, 1873b
    - Subfamily †Orthograptinae Mitchell, 1987
  - Family †Lasiograptidae Lapworth, 1880e
  - Family †Climacograptidae Frech, 1897
  - Family †Dicranograptidae Lapworth, 1873b
    - Subfamily †Dicranograptinae Lapworth, 1873b
    - Subfamily †Nemagraptinae Lapworth, 1873
- Infraorder †Neograptina Štorch et al., 2011
  - (Unranked)
    - Family †Normalograptidae Štorch & Serpagli, 1993
    - Family †Neodiplograptidae Melchin et al., 2011
      - Subfamily †Neodiplograptinae Melchin et al. 2011
      - Subfamily †Petalolithinae Bulman, 1955
  - Superfamily †Retiolitoidea Lapworth, 1873b
    - Family †Retiolitidae Lapworth, 1873b (retiolitids)
      - Subfamily †Retiolitinae Lapworth, 1873
      - Subfamily †Plectograptinae Bouček & Münch, 1952
  - Superfamily †Monograptoidea Lapworth, 1873
    - Family †Dimorphograptidae Elles & Wood, 1908
    - Family †Monograptidae Lapworth, 1873b (monograptids; possibly several subfamilies)
