= Neograptina =

Neograptina Temporal range: Darriwilian-Pragian Possible early Emsian record

Scientific classification
- Kingdom: Animalia
- Phylum: Hemichordata
- Class: Pterobranchia
- Subclass: Graptolithina
- Order: †Graptoloidea
- Suborder: †Axonophora
- Infraorder: †Neograptina; Štorch, Mitchell, Finney, & Melchin, 2011

Subgroups
- †Normalograptidae; †Retiolitoidea; †Neodiplograptidae; †Retiolitidae; †Monograptoidea; †Dimorphograptidae; †Monograptidae

Extinct infraorder of animals

Neograptina is a group of graptolites that includes the Normalograptidae, the Retiolitoidea, and the Monograptoidea. All post-Ordovician graptoloids are neograptines.

== Phylogeny ==
From Melchin et al. (2011).

- Diplograptina
- Neograptina
  - Undulograptus
  - - Oelandograptus
    - - Proclimacograptus
      - - Normalograptus (paraphyletic)
        - Metaclimacograptus (paraphyletic)
        - Rhaphidograptus
        - Hirsutograptus
        - Monograptoidea
          - Avitograptus
          - - Akidograptus
            - - Bulmanograptus
              - Monograptidae
                - Atavograptus (paraphyletic)
                - other monograptids
        - Retiolitoidea
          - Neodiplograptus
          - Metabolograptus (paraphyletic)
          - "Normalograptus" praecursor
          - Korenograptus
          - Rickardsograptus
          - - Paraclimacograptus
            - Retiolitidae
              - Sudburigraptus
              - Paramplexograptus
              - - - Agetograptus
                  - Rivagraptus (paraphyletic)
                - Glyptograptus (paraphyletic)
                - Comograptus
                - Parapetalolithus
                - - Petalolithus
                  - Pseudorthograptus (paraphyletic)
                  - - Hercograptus
                    - Retiolitinae
