= Dichograptidae =

- Dichograptus octobrachiatus

Scientific classification
- Kingdom: Animalia
- Phylum: Hemichordata
- Class: Pterobranchia
- Subclass: Graptolithina
- Order: †Graptoloidea
- Suborder: †Dichograptina
- Family: †Dichograptidae; Lapworth, 1873

Extinct family of graptolites

Dichograptidae is an extinct family of graptolites. Fossils are found mostly from the Late Ordovician to the Early Devonian.

== Genera ==
List of genera from Maletz (2014):

- †Anthograptus Törnquist, 1904
- †Calamograptus Clark, 1924
- †Clonograptus Nicholson, 1873
- †Ctenograptus Nicholson, 1876
- †Dichograptus Salter, 1863
- †Hermannograptus Monsen, 1937
- †Holograptus Holm, 1881a
- †Kellamograptus Rickards & Chapman, 1991
- †Kstaugraptus Tzaj, 1973
- †Loganograptus Hall, 1868
- †Mimograptus Harris & Thomas, 1940
- †Orthodichograptus Thomas, 1972
- †Rouvilligraptus Barrois, 1893
- †Schizograptus Nicholson, 1876
- †Temnograptus Nicholson, 1876
- †Triaenograptus Hall, 1914
- †Tridensigraptus Zhao, 1964
- †Trochograptus Holm, 1881a
