= Roman Kozłowski =

Polish palaeontologist

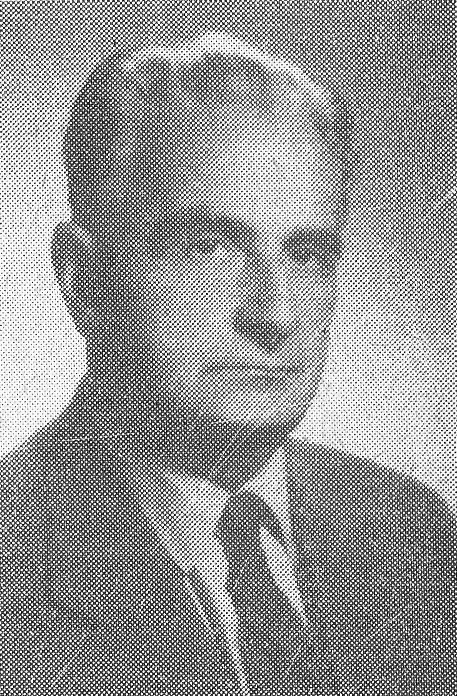
Roman Kozłowski

Roman Stanisław Jakub Kozłowski (1 February 1889 – 2 May 1977) was a Polish palaeontologist, best known for his work on graptolites.

Kozłowski was born in Włocławek, north-west of Warsaw, on 1 February 1889. He studied at universities in Switzerland and Paris, graduating from the Sorbonne in 1910 with a licentiate in natural sciences. Kozłowski worked at the Museum of Natural History in Paris until 1913, when he moved to Bolivia to become professor and director of the National School of Mines.

Kozłowski was a member of the Polish Academy of Sciences, inaugural director of the Academy's Institute of Paleobiology, and founder of Acta Palaeontologica Polonica. Kozłowski was awarded the Mary Clark Thompson Medal in 1958 from the National Academy of Sciences and the Wollaston Medal in 1961.

The graptolite genus Kozlowskitubus was named after him.

== See also ==
- Polish Academy of Sciences
