= Sigmagraptidae =

Scientific classification
- Kingdom: Animalia
- Phylum: Hemichordata
- Class: Pterobranchia
- Subclass: Graptolithina
- Order: †Graptoloidea
- Suborder: †Sinograpta
- Family: †Sigmagraptidae; Cooper & Fortey, 1982

Extinct family of graptolites

Sigmagraptidae is an extinct family of graptolites.

== Genera ==
List of genera from Maletz (2014):

- †Acrograptus Tzaj, 1969
- †Azygograptus Nicholson & Lapworth, 1875 in Nicholson (1875)
- †Eoazygograptus Obut & Sennikov, 1984
- †Eotetragraptus Bouček & Přibyl, 1951
- †Etagraptus Ruedemann, 1904
- †Goniograptus M’Coy, 1876
- †Hemigoniograptus Jin & Wang, 1977
- †Jiangnanograptus Xiao & Chen, 1990
- †Jishougraptus Ge, 1988
- †Keblograptus Riva, 1992
- †Kinnegraptus Skoglund, 1961
- †Laxograptus Cooper & Fortey, 1982
- †Maeandrograptus Moberg, 1892
- †Metazygograptus Obut & Sennikov, 1984
- †Oslograptus Jaanusson, 1965
- †Paradelograptus Erdtmann, Maletz & Gutiérrez-Marco, 1987
- †Paraulograptus Bouček, 1973
- †Pendeosalicograptus Jiao, 1981
- †Perissograptus Williams & Stevens, 1988
- †Praegoniograptus Rickards & Chapman, 1991
- †Prokinnegraptus Mu, 1974
- †Sigmagraptus Ruedemann, 1904
- †Taishanograptus Li & Ge, 1987 in Li, Ge & Chen (1987)
- †Trichograptus Nicholson, 1876
- †Wuninograptus Ni, 1981
- †Yushanograptus Chen, Sun & Han, 1964
