= Rhabdotubus =

Rhabdotubus Temporal range: Cambrian Stage 3–Middle Cambrian

Scientific classification
- Kingdom: Animalia
- Phylum: Hemichordata
- Class: Pterobranchia
- Genus: †Rhabdotubus

Species
- R. robustus; R. johanssoni (type)

Genus of marine worm-like animals

The Lower-Middle Cambrian animal Rhabdotubus is the earliest known pterobranch. It bears strong similarity to the graptolites - indeed for some time it was misclassified as a dendroid graptolite.
