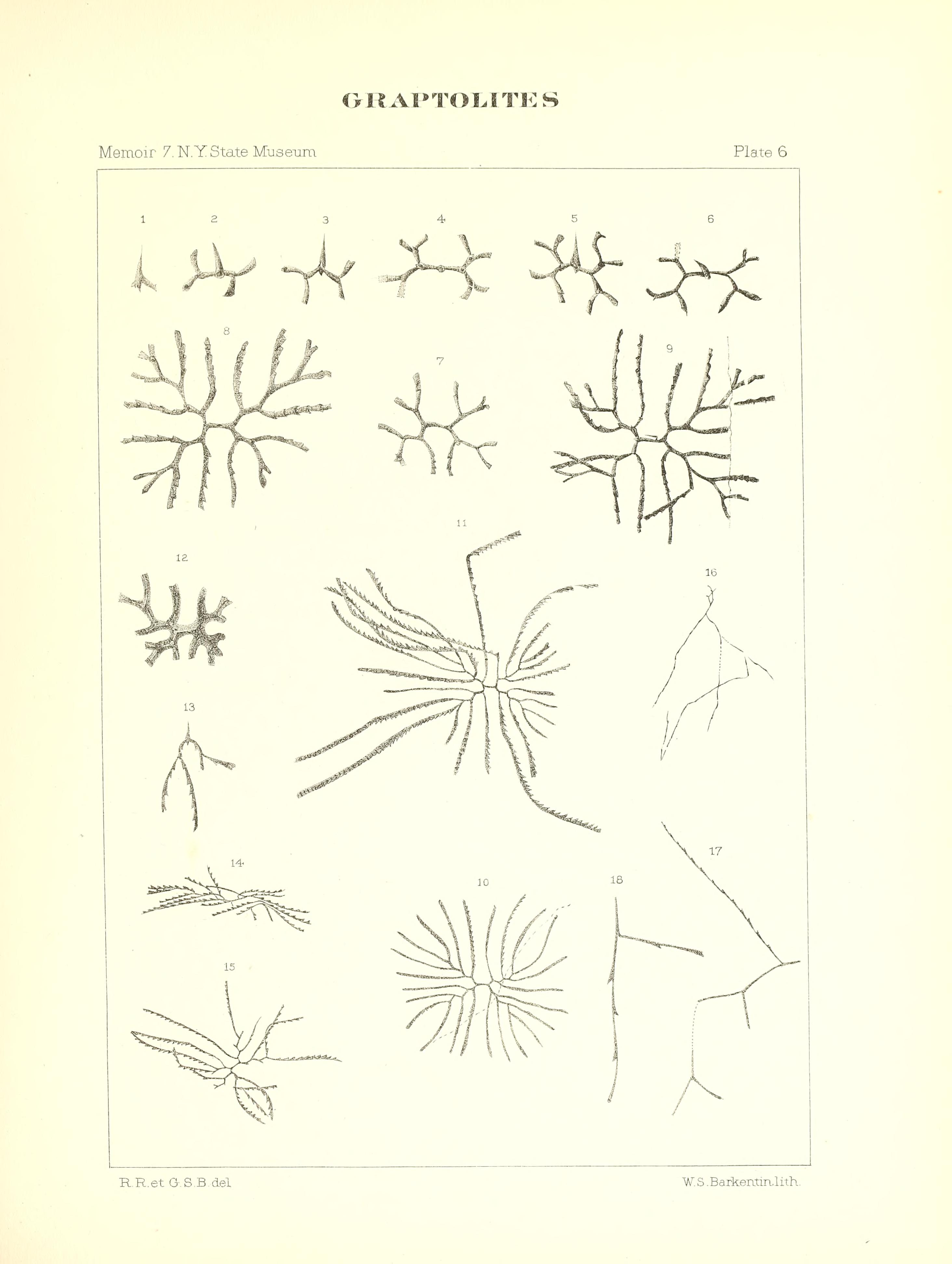
- Goniograptus thureaui

Scientific classification
- Kingdom: Animalia
- Phylum: Hemichordata
- Class: Pterobranchia
- Subclass: Graptolithina
- Order: †Graptoloidea
- Family: †Sigmagraptidae
- Genus: †Goniograptus; M’Coy, 1876

= Goniograptus =

Extinct genus of graptolites

Goniograptus is an extinct genus of graptolites.
