= Dithecodendridae =

Scientific classification
- Kingdom: Animalia
- Phylum: Hemichordata
- Class: Pterobranchia
- Subclass: Graptolithina
- Family: †Dithecodendridae; Obut, 1964

Synonyms
- †Dithecoidea Obut, 1960

Extinct family of graptolites

Dithecodendridae is an extinct family of graptolites.

== Genera ==
List of genera from Maletz (2014):

- †Archaeolafoea Chapman, 1919
- †Bulmanidendrum Obut, 1974
- ? †Dalyia Walcott, 1919
- †Dithecodendrum Obut, 1964
- †Karasidendrum Sennikov, 1998
- †Ovetograptus Sdzuy, 1974
- †Protodendrum Sennikov, 1998
- †Siberiodendrum Obut, 1964
- †Sibiriograptus Obut, 1964
- †Sotograptus Sdzuy, 1974
- †Tarnagraptus Sdzuy, 1974
