= Diplograptidae =

Scientific classification
- Kingdom: Animalia
- Phylum: Hemichordata
- Class: Pterobranchia
- Subclass: Graptolithina
- Order: †Graptoloidea
- Suborder: †Axonophora
- Infraorder: †Diplograptina
- Family: †Diplograptidae; Lapworth, 1873

Extinct family of graptolites

Diplograptidae is an extinct family of graptolites.

== Genera ==
List of genera from Maletz (2014):

=== Subfamily Diplograptinae ===
- †Diplograptus Hisinger, 1837
- †Apiograptus Cooper & McLaurin, 1974
- †Archiclimacograptus Mitchell, 1987
- †Diplograpsis M’Coy, 1850
- †Eoglyptograptus Mitchell, 1987
- †Exigraptus Mu, 1979 in Mu et al. (1979)
- †Fenhshiangograptus Hong, 1957
- †Levisograptus Maletz 2011
- †Mesograptus Elles & Wood, 1907
- †Oepikograptus Obut, 1987
- †Prorectograptus Li, 1994
- †Pseudamplexograptus Mitchell, 1987
- †Urbanekograptus Mitchell, 1987

=== Subfamily Orthograptinae ===
- †Amplexograptus Elles & Wood, 1907
- †Anticostia Stewart & Mitchell, 1997
- †Arnheimograptus Mitchell, 1987
- †Ceramograptus Hudson, 1915
- †Geniculograptus Mitchell, 1987
- †Hustedograptus Mitchell, 1987
- †Orthograptus Lapworth, 1873
- †Orthoretiograptus Mu, 1977 in Wang & Jin (1977)
- †Pacificograptus Koren’, 1979
- †Paraorthograptus Mu et al., 1974
- †Pararetiograptus Mu et al., 1974
- †Peiragraptus Strachan, 1954
- †Pseudoreteograptus Mu, 1993 in Mu et al. (1993)
- †Rectograptus Přibyl, 1949
- †Uticagraptus Riva, 1987
