= Anisograptidae =

Scientific classification
- Kingdom: Animalia
- Phylum: Hemichordata
- Class: Pterobranchia
- Subclass: Graptolithina
- Order: †Graptoloidea
- Suborder: †Graptodendroidina; Mu & Lin, 1981
- Family: †Anisograptidae; Bulman, 1950

Extinct family of graptolites

Anisograptidae is an extinct family of graptolites. As the first planktic graptolites, they play a crucial role for understanding the transition of graptolites from ocean floor suspension feeders to ocean surface plankton during the early Ordovician.

Anisograptids can be quadriradiate (Rhabdinopora, Staurograptus), triradiate (Anisograptus, Triograptus), or biradiate (Adelograptus, Kiaerograptus).

== Genera ==
List of genera from Maletz (2014):

- †Adelograptus Bulman, 1941
- †Aletograptus Obut & Sobolevskaya, 1962
- †Ancoragraptus Jackson & Lenz, 2003
- †Anisograptus Ruedemann, 1937
- †Aorograptus Williams & Stevens, 1991
- †Araneograptus Erdtmann & VandenBerg, 1985
- †Bryograptus Lapworth, 1880
- †Chigraptus Jackson & Lenz, 1999
- †Choristograptus Legrand, 1964
- †Damesograptus Jahn, 1892
- †Dictyodendron Westergård, 1909
- †Dictyograptus Hopkinson, 1875 in Hopkinson & Lapworth (1875)
- †Dictyograptus Westergård, 1909
- †Diphygraptus Zhao & Zhang, 1985
- †Graptopora Salter, 1858
- †Heterograptus Zhao & Zhang in Lin, 1986
- †Holopsigraptus Zhao & Zhang, 1985
- †Hunjiangograptus Zhao & Zhang, 1985
- †Hunnegraptus Lindholm, 1991
- †Kiaerograptus Spjeldnaes, 1963
- †Muenzhigraptus Zhao & Zhang, 1985
- †Neoclonograptus Zhao & Zhang, 1985
- ? †Nephelograptus Ruedemann, 1947
- †Paraclonograptus Zhao & Zhang, 1985
- †Paratemnograptus Williams & Stevens, 1991
- †Phyllograpta Angelin, 1854
- †Psigraptus Jackson, 1967
- †Radiograptus Bulman, 1950
- †Rhabdinopora Eichwald, 1855
- †Sagenograptus Obut & Sobolevskaya, 1962
- †Staurograpsus Emmons, 1855
- ? †Stellatograptus Erdtmann, 1967
- †Toyenograptus Li, 1984
- †Triograptus Monsen, 1925
- †Triramograptus Erdtmann, 1998 in Cooper et al. (1998)
- †Yukonograptus Lin, 1981
