= Rhabdinopora =

Rhabdinopora Temporal range: Ordovician (Tremadocian) Possible Furongian record

Scientific classification
- Kingdom: Animalia
- Phylum: Hemichordata
- Class: Pterobranchia
- Subclass: Graptolithina
- Order: †Graptoloidea
- Family: †Anisograptidae
- Genus: †Rhabdinopora

Genus of marine worm-like animals

Rhabdinopora is a genus of graptolites belonging to the family Anisograptidae. It is the earliest planktic graptolite and is presumably the ancestor of all later planktic graptoloids. Some species identified as the first planktid graptolite are:

- Rhabdinopora proparabola
- Rhabdinopora praeparabola
- Rhabdinopora parabola
- Rhabdinopora flabelliformis
