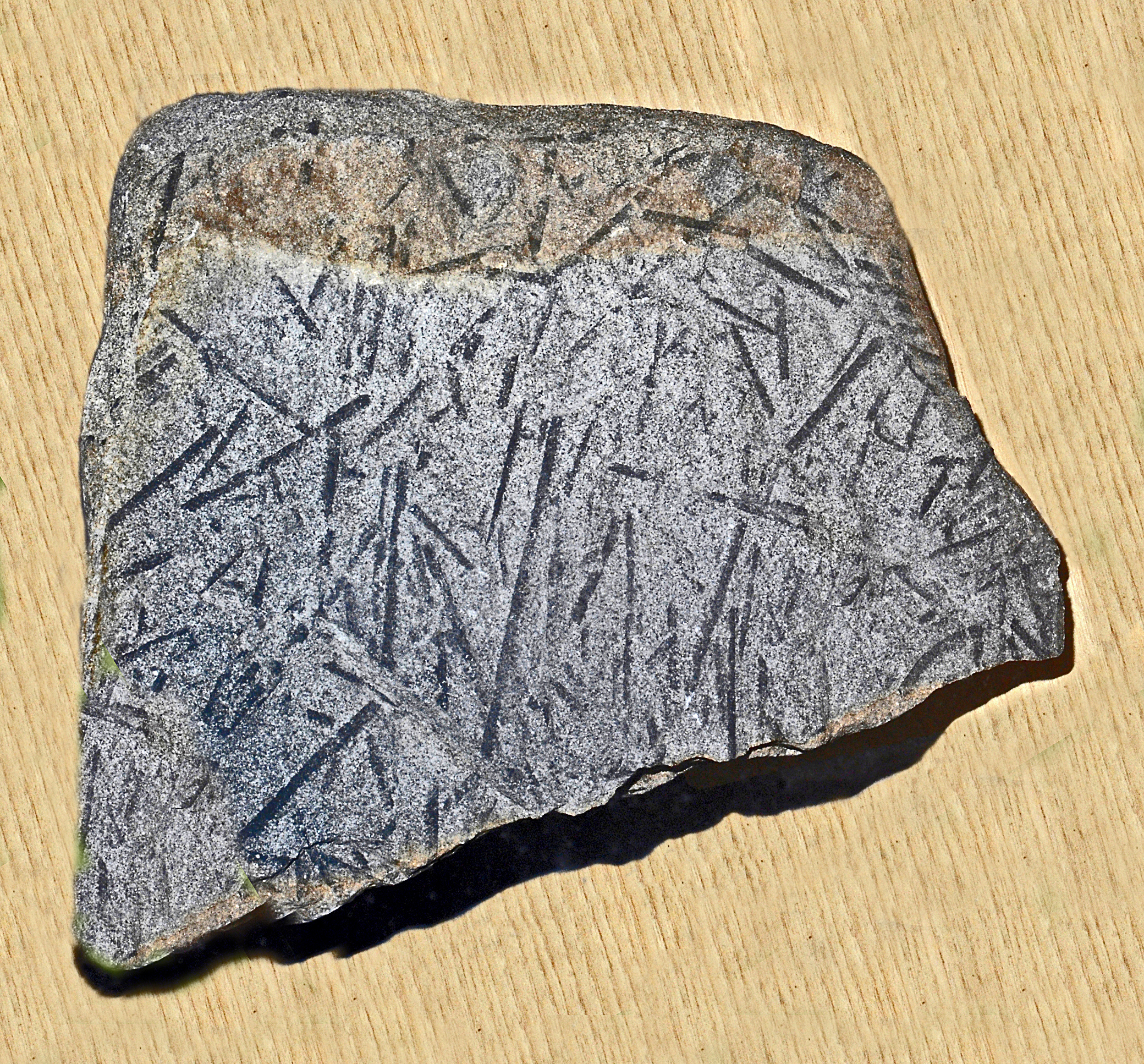
- Fossil of Monograptus flemingi

Scientific classification
- Kingdom: Animalia
- Phylum: Hemichordata
- Class: Pterobranchia
- Subclass: Graptolithina
- Order: †Graptoloidea
- Suborder: †Axonophora
- Infraorder: †Neograptina
- Superfamily: †Monograptoidea
- Family: †Monograptidae; Lapworth, 1873

= Monograptidae =

Monograptidae Temporal range: Rhuddanian–Pragian Possible early Emsian record

Extinct family of graptolites

Monograptidae is an extinct family of graptolites of the order Graptoloidea. Monograptids have only one row of thecae per stipe (stem, branch), unlike the biserial graptolites which have two opposing rows of thecae per stipe.

== Genera ==
List of genera from the Treatise on Invertebrate Paleontology:

=== Pernerograptinae ===
==== Genera with short siculae ====
- †Atavograptus Rickards, 1974
- †Euroclimacis Štorch, 1998
- †Monoclimacis Frech, 1897
- †Pernerograptus Přibyl, 1941
- †Pribylograptus Obut and Sokolevskaya, 1966

==== Genera with long siculae ====
- †Coronograptus Obut, Sokolevskaya, and Merkureva, 1968
- †Huttagraptus Koren' and Bjerreskov, 1997
- †Lagarograptus Obut, Sokolevskaya, and Merkureva, 1968
- †Neolagarograptus Štorch, 1998

=== 'Streptograptines' ===
- †Streptograptus Yin, 1937
- †Mediograptus Přibyl, 1948
- †Paramonoclimacis Wang et al. 1977
- †Pseudostreptograptus Loydell, 1991
- †Trimorphograptus Zhao, 1984

=== Subfamily Monograptinae ===
==== Genera without cladia ====
- †Aeronites Štorch et al. 2026
- †Campograptus Obut, 1949
- †Cochlograptus Obut, 1987
- †Cultellograptus Loydell and Nestor, 2006
- †Demirastrites Eisel, 1912
- †Lapworthograptus Bouček and Přibyl, 1952
- †Lituigraptus Ni, 1978
- †Monograptus Geinitz, 1852
- †Oktavites Levina, 1928
- †Rastrites Barrande, 1850
- †Spirograptus Gürich, 1908
- †Stimulograptus Přibyl and Štorch, 1983
- †Testograptus Přibyl, 1967
- †Torquigraptus Loydell, 1993

==== Genera with cladia ====
- †Cyrtograptus Murchison, 1867
- †Barrandeograptus Bouček, 1933
- †Diversograptus Manck, 1923
- †Paradiversograptus Sennikov, 1976
- †Sinodiversograptus Mu and Chen, 1962

=== Subfamily Pristiograptinae ===
- †Colonograptus Přibyl, 1943
- †Dulebograptus Tsegelnjuk, 1976
- †Formosograptus Bouček, Mihajlovic, and Vaselinovic, 1976
- †Heisograptus Tsegelnjuk, 1976
- †Neomonograptus Mu and Ni, 1975
- †Pristiograptus Jaekel, 1889
- †Proteograptus Lenz, Senior, Kozłowska, and Melchin, 2012
- †Pseudomonoclimacis Mikhailova, 1975
- †Saetograptus Přibyl, 1943
- †Skalograptus Tsegelnjuk, 1976
- †Slovinograptus Urbanek, 1997
- †Uncinatograptus Tsegelnjuk, 1976
- †Wandograptus Rickards and Jell, 2002
- †Wolynograptus Tsegelnjuk, 1976

=== Subfamily Linograptinae ===
==== Genera without cladia ====
- †Bohemograptus Přibyl, 1967
- †Crinitograptus Rickards, 1995
- †Cucullograptus Urbanek, 1954
- †Egregiograptus Rickards and Wright, 1997
- †Enigmagraptus Rickards and Wright, 2004
- †Korenea Rickards, Packham, Wright, and Williamson, 1995
- †Lobograptus Urbanek, 1958
- †Neocucullograptus Urbanek, 1970
- †Neolobograptus Urbanek, 1970
- †Polonograptus Tsegelnjuk, 1976
- †Urbanekia Rickards and Wright, 1999

==== Genera with cladia ====
- †Abiesgraptus Hundt, 1935
- †Lenzograptus Loydell, 2021
- †Linograptus Frech, 1897
- †Neodiversograptus Urbanek, 1963
- †Prolinograptus Rickards and Wright, 1997
