= Clonograptus =

Scientific classification
- Kingdom: Animalia
- Phylum: Hemichordata
- Class: Pterobranchia
- Subclass: Graptolithina
- Genus: †Clonograptus; Nicholson, 1873

Genus of marine worm-like animals

Clonograptus is a genus of graptolites. Groups of these animals were connected by stalklike structures to a central region. Species of Clonograptus are zone fossils, and can be used to find the precise age of Ordovician rocks.
