= Dimorphograptidae =

Scientific classification
- Kingdom: Animalia
- Phylum: Hemichordata
- Class: Pterobranchia
- Subclass: Graptolithina
- Order: †Graptoloidea
- Suborder: †Axonophora
- Infraorder: †Neograptina
- Superfamily: †Monograptoidea
- Family: †Dimorphograptidae; Elles & Wood, 1908

Extinct family of graptolites

Dimorphograptidae is an extinct family of graptolites.

== Genera ==
List of genera from Maletz (2014):

- †Akidograptus Davies, 1929
- †Avitograptus Melchin et al., 2011
- †Bulmanograptus Přibyl, 1948b
- †Cardograptus Hundt, 1965
- †Dimorphograptus Lapworth, 1876b
- †Metadimorphograptus Přibyl, 1948b
- †Parakidograptus Li & Ge, 1981
