= Isograptidae =

Scientific classification
- Kingdom: Animalia
- Phylum: Hemichordata
- Class: Pterobranchia
- Subclass: Graptolithina
- Order: †Graptoloidea
- Suborder: †Glossograptina
- Family: †Isograptidae; Harris, 1933

Extinct family of graptolites

Isograptidae is an extinct family of graptolites.

== Genera ==
List of genera from Maletz (2014):

- †Arienigraptus Yu & Fang, 1981
- †Cardiograptus Harris & Keble, 1916 in Harris (1916)
- †Isograptus Moberg, 1892
- †Oncograptus Hall, 1914
- †Paracardiograptus Mu & Lee, 1958
- †Parisograptus Chen & Zhang, 1996
- †Procardiograptus Xiao, Xia & Wang 1985
- †Proncograptus Xiao, Xia & Wang, 1985
- †Pseudisograptus Beavis, 1972
- †Xiushuigraptus Yu & Fang, 1983
