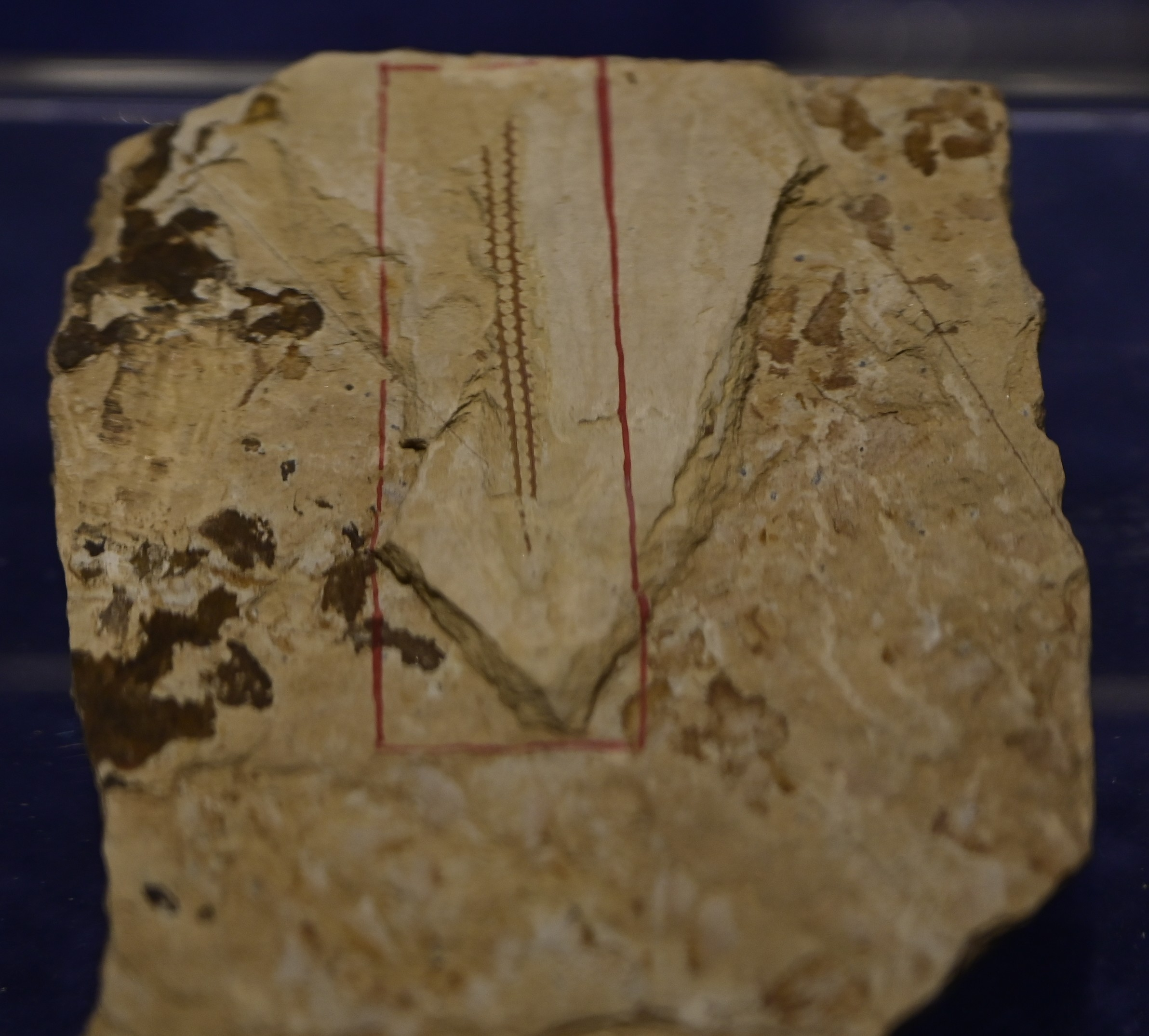
- Tylograptus specimen, National Natural History Museum of China

Scientific classification
- Kingdom: Animalia
- Phylum: Hemichordata
- Class: Pterobranchia
- Subclass: Graptolithina
- Order: †Graptoloidea
- Suborder: †Sinograpta
- Family: †Sinograptidae; Mu, 1957

= Sinograptidae =

Extinct family of graptolites

Sinograptidae is an extinct family of graptolites.

== Genera ==
List of genera from Maletz (2014):

- †Allograptus Mu, 1957
- †Anomalograptus Clark, 1924
- †Atopograptus Harris, 1926
- †Brachiograptus Harris & Keble, 1932
- †Hemiholmograptus Hsü & Chao, 1976
- †Holmograptus Kozłowski, 1954
- †Nicholsonograptus Bouček & Přibyl, 1951
- †Paradidymograptus Mu, Geh & Yin, 1962 in Mu et al. (1962)
- †Pseudodichograptus Chu, 1965
- †Pseudojanograptus Hsü & Chao, 1976
- †Pseudologanograptus Hsü & Chao, 1976
- †Pseudotetragraptus Hsü & Chao, 1976
- †Sinazygograptus Wang & Wu, 1977 in Wang & Jin (1977)
- †Sinograptus Mu, 1957
- †Tylograptus Mu, 1957
- †Zygograptus Harris & Thomas, 1941
