= Didymograptidae =

Scientific classification
- Kingdom: Animalia
- Phylum: Hemichordata
- Class: Pterobranchia
- Subclass: Graptolithina
- Order: †Graptoloidea
- Suborder: †Dichograptina
- Family: †Didymograptidae; Mu, 1950

Extinct family of graptolites

Didymograptidae is an extinct family of graptolites.

== Genera ==
List of genera from Maletz (2014):

- †Aulograptus Skevington, 1965
- †Baltograptus Maletz, 1994
- †Cladograpsus Geinitz, 1852
- †Cymatograptus Jaanusson, 1965
- †Didymograptus M’Coy, 1851 in Sedgwick & M’Coy (1851)
- †Expansograptus Bouček & Přibyl, 1951
- †Janograptus Tullberg, 1880
- †Jenkinsograptus Gutiérrez-Marco, 1986
- †Parazygograptus Kozłowski, 1954
- †Trigonograpsus Nicholson, 1869
