= Abrograptidae =

Scientific classification
- Kingdom: Animalia
- Phylum: Hemichordata
- Class: Pterobranchia
- Subclass: Graptolithina
- Order: †Graptoloidea
- Suborder: †Sinograpta
- Family: †Abrograptidae; Mu, 1958

Extinct family of graptolites

Abrograptidae is an extinct family of graptolites from the Middle Ordovician.

== Genera ==
List of genera from Maletz (2014):

- †Abrograptus Mu, 1958
- †Dinemagraptus Kozłowski, 1951
- †Jiangshanites Mu & Qiao, 1962
- †Metabrograptus Strachan, 1990
- †Parabrograptus Mu & Qiao, 1962
