= Lasiograptidae =

Scientific classification
- Kingdom: Animalia
- Phylum: Hemichordata
- Class: Pterobranchia
- Subclass: Graptolithina
- Order: †Graptoloidea
- Suborder: †Axonophora
- Infraorder: †Diplograptina
- Family: †Lasiograptidae; Lapworth, 1880

Extinct family of graptolites

Lasiograptidae is an extinct family of graptolites.

== Genera ==
List of genera from Maletz (2014):

- †Arachniograptus Ross & Berry, 1963
- †Archiretiolites Eisenack, 1935
- †Brevigraptus Mitchell, 1988
- †Hallograptus Lapworth, 1876a
- †Lasiograptus Lapworth, 1873
- †Neurograptus Elles & Wood, 1908
- †Nymphograptus Elles & Wood, 1908
- †Orthoretiolites Whittington, 1954
- †Paraplegmatograptus Mu & Lin, 1984
- †Phormograptus Whittington, 1955
- †Pipiograptus Whittington, 1955
- †Plegmatograptus Elles & Wood, 1908
- †Sunigraptus Mu, 1993 in Mu et al. (1993)
- †Tysanograptus Elles & Wood, 1908
- †Yangzigraptus Mu, 1983 in Yang et al. (1983)
- †Yinograptus Mu, 1962 in Mu & Chen (1962)
