= Normalograptidae =

Scientific classification
- Kingdom: Animalia
- Phylum: Hemichordata
- Class: Pterobranchia
- Subclass: Graptolithina
- Order: †Graptoloidea
- Suborder: †Axonophora
- Infraorder: †Neograptina
- Family: †Normalograptidae; Štorch & Serpagli, 1993

Extinct family of graptolites

Normalograptidae is an extinct family of graptolites.

== Genera ==
List of genera from Maletz (2014):

- †Clinoclimacograptus Bulman & Rickards, 1968
- †Cystograptus Hundt, 1942
- †Hedrograptus Obut, 1949
- ? †Hirsutograptus Koren’ & Rickards, 1996
- ? †Limpidograptus Khaletskaya, 1962
- †Lithuanograptus Paskevicius, 1976
- †Metaclimacograptus Bulman & Rickards, 1968
- †Neodicellograptus Mu & Wang, 1977 in Wang & Jin (1977)
- †Neoglyptograptus Rickards et al. 1995
- †Normalograptus Legrand, 1987
- †Pseudoglyptograptus Bulman & Rickards, 1968
- †Retioclimacis Mu et al., 1974
- †Rhaphidograptus Bulman, 1936
- †Scalarigraptus Riva, 1988
- †Sichuanograptus Zhao, 1976
- †Skanegraptus Maletz, 2011c
- †Talacastograptus Cuerda, Rickards & Cingolani, 1988
