= Retiolitidae =

Retiolitidae Temporal range: Hirnantian–Ludfordian

Scientific classification
- Kingdom: Animalia
- Phylum: Hemichordata
- Class: Pterobranchia
- Subclass: Graptolithina
- Order: †Graptoloidea
- Suborder: †Axonophora
- Infraorder: †Neograptina
- Superfamily: †Retiolitoidea; Lapworth, 1873
- Family: †Retiolitidae; Lapworth, 1873

Extinct family of graptolites

Retiolitidae is an extinct family of graptolites. One subfamily, the Retiolitinae, is characterized by meshwork-like tubaria.

== Genera ==
List of genera from the Treatise on Invertebrate Paleontology:

=== Subfamily Petalolithinae ===
==== Ancorate taxa ====
- †Petalolithus Suess, 1851
- †Cephalograptus Hopkinson, 1869
- †Dischidiograptus Ni, 1978
- †Dimorphograptoides Koren’ & Rickards, 1996
- †Dittograptus Obut & Sobolevskaya, 1968 in Obut et al. (1968)
- †Hercograptus Melchin, 1999
- †Pseudorthograptus Legrand, 1987
- †Spinadiplograptus Hundt, 1965
- †Victorograptus Koren’ & Rickards, 1996

==== Non-ancorate taxa ====
- †Agetograptus Obut & Sobolevskaya in Obut et al., 1968
- †Comograptus Obut & Sobolevskaya, 1968 in Obut et al. (1968)
- †Glyptograptus Lapworth, 1873
- †Paramplexograptus Melchin et al., 2011
- †Parapetalolithus Koren’ & Rickards, 1996
- †Petalograptus Suess, 1851
- †Rivagraptus Koren’ & Rickards, 1996
- †Sudburigraptus Koren’ & Rickards, 1996

=== Subfamily Retiolitinae ===
- †Retiolites Barrande, 1850
- †Aeroretiolites Melchin et al, 2017
- †Baculograptus Lenz & Kozłowska-Dawidziuk, 2002
- †Cometograptus Kozłowska-Dawidziuk, 2001
- †Dabashanograptus Ge, 1990
- †Doliograptus Lenz & Kozłowska-Dawidziuk, 2002
- †Eiseligraptus Hundt, 1965
- †Eisenackograptus Kozłowska-Dawidziuk, 1990
- †Eorograptus Sennikov, 1984
- †Giganteograptus Lenz & Kozłowska, 2007
- †Gothograptus Frech, 1897
- †Hoffmanigraptus Kozłowska, 2021
- †Holoretiolites Eisenack, 1951
- †Kirkigraptus Kozłowska & Bates, 2008
- †Neogothograptus Kozłowska-Dawidziuk, 1995
- †Papiliograptus Lenz & Kozłowska, 2002
- †Paraplectograptus Přibyl, 1948a
- †Pileograptus Lenz & Kozłowska, 2007
- †Plectodinemagraptus Kozłowska-Dawidziuk, 1995
- †Plectograptus Moberg & Törnquist, 1909
- †Pseudoplegmatograptus Přibyl, 1948b
- †Pseudoretiolites Bouček & Münch, 1944
- †Reticuloplectograptus Kozłowska, Bates & Piras, 2010
- †Rotaretiolites Bates & Kirk, 1992
- †Sagenograptoides Lenz & Kozłowska, 2010
- †Semigothograptus Kozłowska, 2016
- †Semiplectograptus Kozłowska-Dawidziuk, 1995
- †Sokolovograptus Obut & Zaslavskaya, 1976
- †Spinograptus Bouček & Münch, 1952
- †Stomatograptus Tullberg, 1883
- †Valentinagraptus Piras, 2006
- †Virgellograptus Kozłowska, 2015

=== Uncertain genera ===
- †Demicystograptus Hundt, 1950
- †Mirorgraptus Lenz & Kozłowska, 2007
- †Neoglyptograptus Rickards et al, 1995
- †Parademicystograptus Hundt, 1950
- †Thecocystograptus Hundt, 1950
