= Dicranograptidae =

Scientific classification
- Kingdom: Animalia
- Phylum: Hemichordata
- Class: Pterobranchia
- Subclass: Graptolithina
- Order: †Graptoloidea
- Suborder: †Axonophora
- Infraorder: †Diplograptina
- Family: †Dicranograptidae; Lapworth, 1873

Extinct family of graptolites

Dicranograptidae is an extinct family of graptolites.

== Genera ==
List of genera from Maletz (2014):

=== Subfamily Dicranograptinae ===
- †Aclistograptus Ge, 2002 in Mu et al. (2002)
- †Amphigraptus Lapworth, 1873
- †Cladograpsus Emmons, 1855
- †Cladograpsus Carruthers, 1858
- †Clematograptus Hopkinson, 1875 in Hopkinson & Lapworth (1875)
- †Deflexigraptus Mu, 2002 in Mu et al. (2002)
- †Dicaulograptus Rickards & Bulman, 1965
- †Dicellograpsus Hopkinson, 1871
- †Diceratograptus Mu, 1963
- †Dicranograptus Hall, 1865
- †Incumbograptus Ge, 2002 in Mu et al. (2002)
- †Jiangxigraptus Yu & Fang, 1966
- †Leptograptus Lapworth, 1873
- †Ningxiagraptus Ge, 2002 in Mu et al. (2002)
- †Pseudazygograptus Mu, Lee & Geh, 1960
- †Syndyograptus Ruedemann, 1908
- †Tangyagraptus Mu, 1963

=== Subfamily Nemagraptinae ===
- †Coenograptus Hall, 1868
- †Geitonograptus Obut & Zubtzov, 1964
- †Helicograpsus Nicholson, 1868
- †Nemagraptus Emmons, 1855
- †Ordosograptus Lin, 1980
- †Pleurograpsus Nicholson, 1867
- †Stephanograptus Geinitz, 1866
