= Climacograptidae =

Scientific classification
- Kingdom: Animalia
- Phylum: Hemichordata
- Class: Pterobranchia
- Subclass: Graptolithina
- Order: †Graptoloidea
- Suborder: †Axonophora
- Infraorder: †Diplograptina
- Family: †Climacograptidae; Frech, 1897

Extinct family of graptolites

Climacograptidae is an extinct family of graptolites.

== Genera ==
List of genera from Maletz (2014):

- †Appendispinograptus Li & Li, 1985
- †Clathrograptus Lapworth, 1873
- †Climacograptus Hall, 1865
- †Diplacanthograptus Mitchell, 1987
- †Euclimacograptus Riva, 1989 in Riva & Ketner (1989)
- †Gymnograptus Bulman, 1953
- †Haddingograptus Maletz, 1997
- †Idiograptus Lapworth, 1880
- †Leptothecalograptus Li, 2002 in Mu et al. (2002)
- †Mendograptus Rusconi 1948
- †Notograptus Rusconi 1948
- †Oelandograptus Mitchell, 1987
- †Proclimacograptus Maletz, 1997
- †Prolasiograptus Lee, 1963
- †Pseudoclimacograptus Přibyl, 1947
- †Reteograptus Hall, 1859 (= Retiograptus Hall, 1865)
- †Styracograptus Štorch et al., 2011
- †Undulograptus Bouček, 1973
