= Glossograptidae =

Scientific classification
- Kingdom: Animalia
- Phylum: Hemichordata
- Class: Pterobranchia
- Subclass: Graptolithina
- Order: †Graptoloidea
- Suborder: †Glossograptina
- Family: †Glossograptidae; Lapworth, 1873

Extinct family of graptolites

Glossograptidae is an extinct family of graptolites.

== Genera ==
List of genera from Maletz (2014):

- †Apoglossograptus Finney, 1978
- †Bergstroemograptus Finney & Chen, 1984
- †Corynites Kozłowski, 1956
- †Corynograptus Hopkinson & Lapworth, 1875
- †Corynoides Nicholson, 1867
- †Cryptograptus Lapworth, 1880f
- †Glossograpsus Emmons, 1855
- †Kalpinograptus Jiao, 1977
- †Lonchograptus Tullberg, 1880
- †Mimograptus Lapworth, 1908 in Elles & Wood (1908)
- †Nanograptus Hadding, 1915
- †Paraglossograptus Mu in Hsü, 1959
- †Rogercooperia Sherwin & Rickards, 2000
- †Sinoretiograptus Mu et al., 1974
- †Skiagraptus Harris, 1933
- †Tonograptus Williams, 1992
