= Pterograptidae =

Scientific classification
- Kingdom: Animalia
- Phylum: Hemichordata
- Class: Pterobranchia
- Subclass: Graptolithina
- Order: †Graptoloidea
- Suborder: †Dichograptina
- Family: †Pterograptidae; Mu, 1950

Extinct family of graptolites

Pterograptidae is an extinct family of graptolites.

== Genera ==
List of genera from Maletz (2014):

- †Didymograptellus Cooper & Fortey, 1982
- †Pseudobryograptus Mu, 1957
- †Pterograptus Holm, 1881b
- †Xiphograptus Cooper & Fortey, 1982
- †Yutagraptus Riva, 1994
