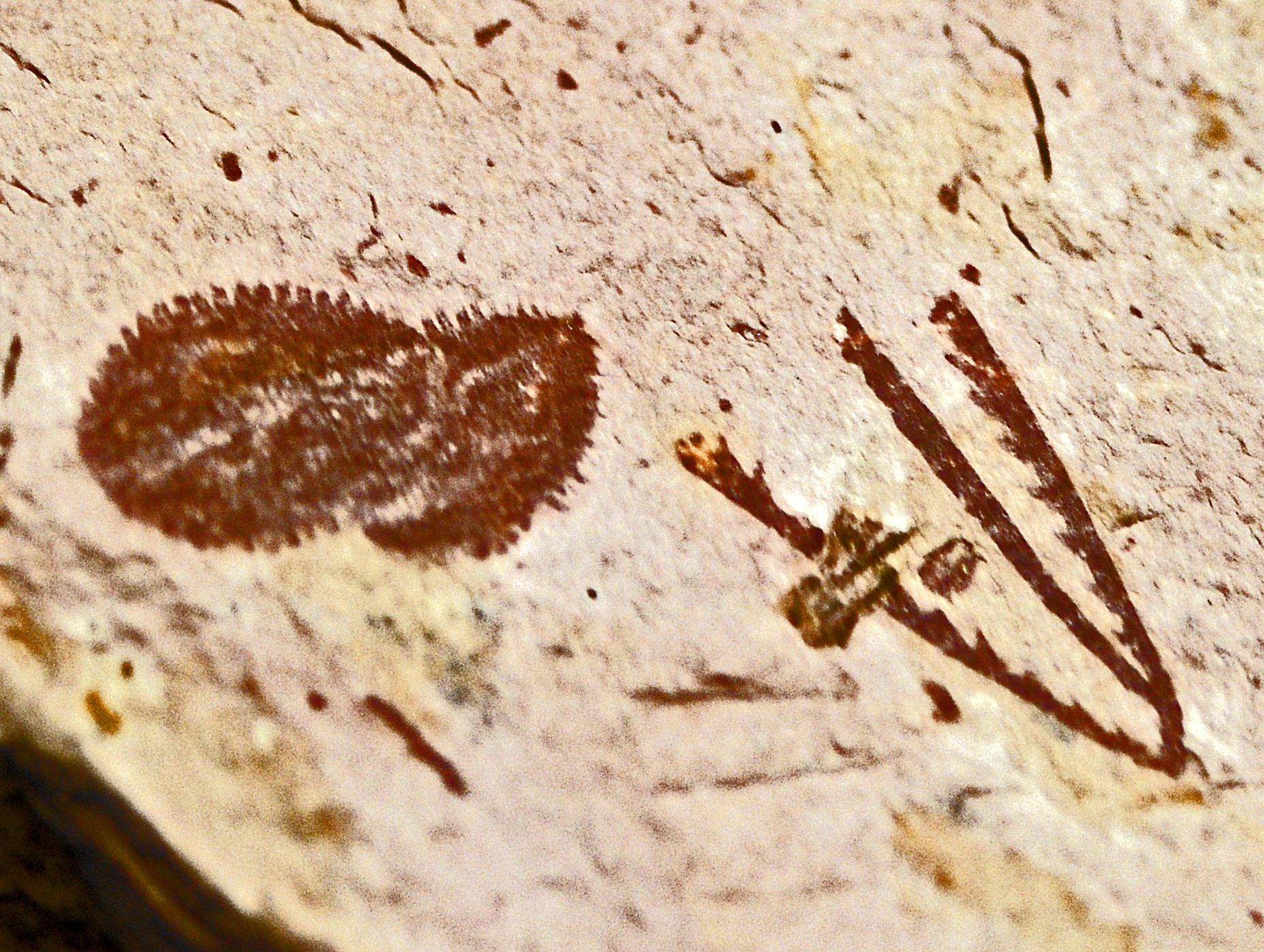
- Phyllograptus species

Scientific classification
- Kingdom: Animalia
- Phylum: Hemichordata
- Class: Pterobranchia
- Subclass: Graptolithina
- Order: †Graptoloidea
- Family: †Tetragraptidae
- Genus: †Phyllograptus; Hall, 1858

= Phyllograptus =

Phyllograptus Temporal range: Early Ordovician

Genus of marine worm-like animals

Phyllograptus is a graptolite genus of the order Graptoloidea, in the family Tetragraptidae.

Fossils of this genus have been found in the Early Ordovician (475-473 million years ago), in the sediments of Australia, Bolivia, Canada, Chile, China, New Zealand, Norway, Spain, Sweden, the United Kingdom and United States.

The normal length of a colony of these leaf-shaped animals could reach a length of 3.5 centimetres (1.4 in). They were passively mobile planktonic suspension feeders.

Phyllograptus species are excellent index fossils or guide fossils for identifying Ordovician rocks.

== Species ==
- Phyllograptus angustifolius
- Phyllograptus anna
- Phyllograptus densus
- Phyllograptus glossograptoides
- Phyllograptus rotundatus
