= Diplograptus =

Diplograptus Temporal range: Late Katian - Early Hirnantian

Scientific classification
- Kingdom: Animalia
- Phylum: Hemichordata
- Class: Pterobranchia
- Subclass: Graptolithina
- Order: †Graptoloidea
- Family: †Diplograptidae
- Genus: †Diplograptus; Hisinger, 1837

Genus of graptolite

Diplograptus was a Ordovician genus of graptolites.
