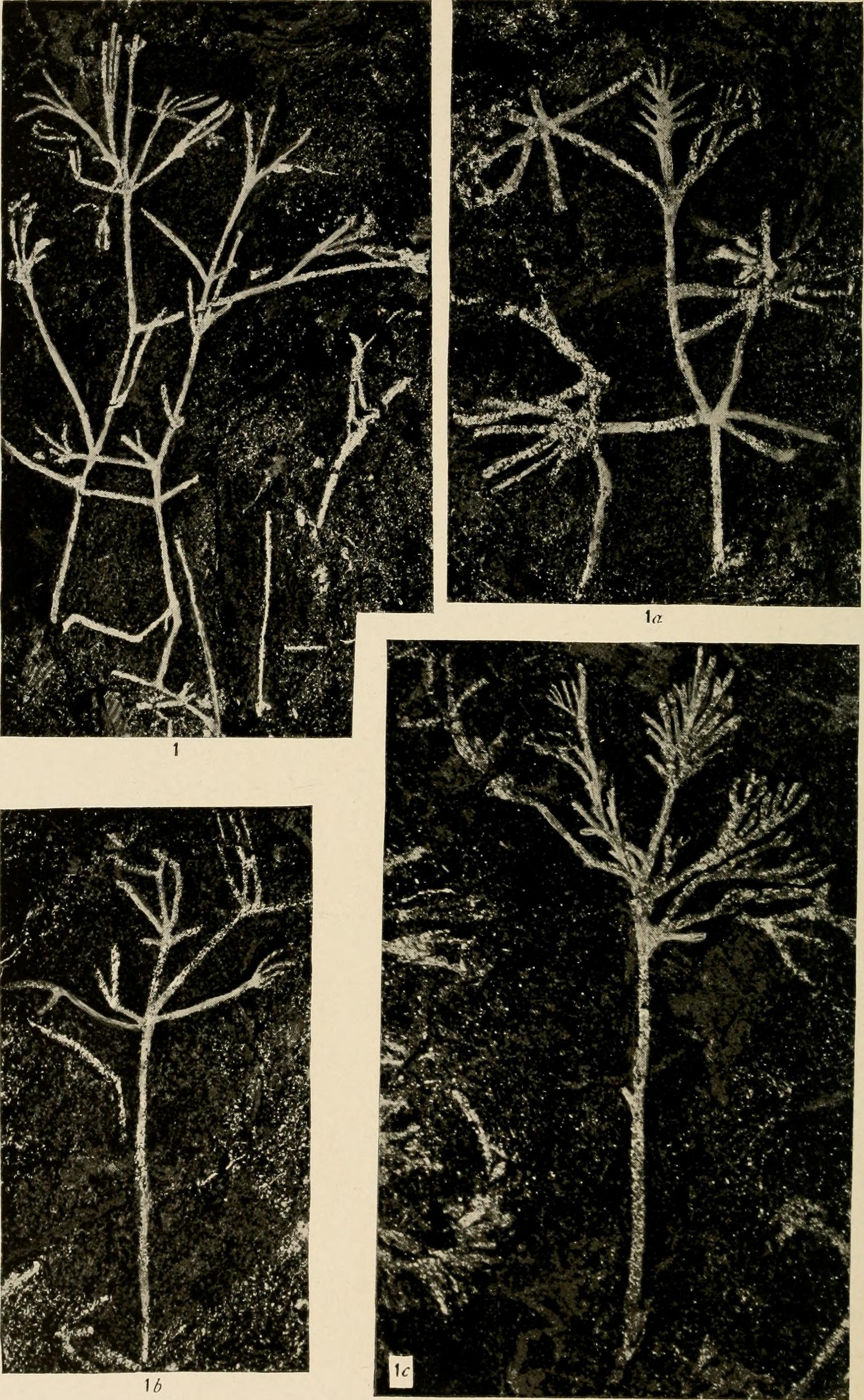
- Images from Walcott from fossils collected at the Burgess Shale, published in 1924. The bottom two photos are Dalyia nitens (left) and Dalyia racemata.(right)

Scientific classification
- Kingdom: Animalia
- Phylum: Hemichordata
- Class: Pterobranchia
- Subclass: Graptolithina (?)
- Genus: †Dalyia; Walcott, 1919

= Dalyia =

Dalyia Temporal range: Cambrian

Genus of marine worm-like animals

Dalyia is a genus of worm-like fossilized organisms found in the Walcott Quarry and Trilobite beds of the Burgess Shale from the middle Cambrian. Due to its branching structure, it was previously interpreted as a red alga. However further examinations in 2015 suggest they may instead be pterobranchs, a class of small tube-dwelling worms. It has smooth or faintly lineated stems, which branch into up to four equal branches at branching points. 37 specimens of Dalyia are known from the Greater Phyllopod bed, where they comprise 0.07% of the community.
