= Dichograptus =

Dichograptus Temporal range: Ordovician ~478–463 Ma
- Dichograptus octobrachiatus

Scientific classification
- Kingdom: Animalia
- Phylum: Hemichordata
- Class: Pterobranchia
- Subclass: Graptolithina
- Order: †Graptoloidea
- Family: †Dichograptidae
- Genus: †Dichograptus; Salter, 1863

Type species
- Dichograptus sedgwicki Salter, 1863

Genus of marine worm-like animals

Dichograptus (meaning two-branched writing or double-line marks) is an extinct genus of graptolites from the Ordovician.

Dichograptus probably fed on plankton. Individual animals were very tiny, only growing a few millimeters in length (1/8 of an inch).

== Distribution ==
Fossils of Dichograptus have been found in Argentina, Chile, China, Colombia (near Caño Cristales, Meta), New Zealand, Norway, and the United Kingdom.
