= Cardiograptus =

Scientific classification
- Kingdom: Animalia
- Phylum: Hemichordata
- Class: Pterobranchia
- Subclass: Graptolithina
- Order: †Graptoloidea
- Family: †Isograptidae
- Genus: †Cardiograptus; Harris & Keble in Harris, 1916

Genus of marine worm-like animals

Cardiograptus is a genus of graptolite, which is easily recognised even when poorly preserved by the form of the thecae.
