= Isograptus =

Scientific classification
- Kingdom: Animalia
- Phylum: Hemichordata
- Class: Pterobranchia
- Subclass: Graptolithina
- Order: †Graptoloidea
- Family: †Isograptidae
- Genus: †Isograptus; Moberg, 1892

Genus of marine worm-like animals

Isograptus is an extinct genus of graptolites from the Ordovician.
