= Wimanicrustidae =

Scientific classification
- Kingdom: Animalia
- Phylum: Hemichordata
- Class: Pterobranchia
- Subclass: Graptolithina
- Family: †Wimanicrustidae; Bulman, 1970

Synonyms
- †Crustoidea Bulman 1970

Extinct family of graptolites

Wimanicrustidae is an extinct family of graptolites.

== Genera ==
List of genera from Maletz (2014):

- †Bulmanicrusta Kozłowski, 1962
- †Ellesicrusta Kozłowski, 1962
- †Graptoblastoides Kozłowski, 1949
- †Graptoblastus Kozłowski, 1949
- †Holmicrusta Kozłowski, 1962
- †Hormograptus Öpik, 1930
- †Lapworthicrusta Kozłowski, 1962
- †Maenniligraptus Mierzejewski, 1986b
- †Ruedemannicrusta Kozłowski, 1962
- †Thallograptus Öpik, 1928
- †Urbanekicrusta Mierzejewski, 1986b
- †Wimanicrusta Kozłowski, 1962
- †Xenocyathus Eisenack, 1982
