= Neodiplograptidae =

Neodiplograptidae Temporal range: Katian–Ludfordian

Scientific classification
- Kingdom: Animalia
- Phylum: Hemichordata
- Class: Pterobranchia
- Subclass: Graptolithina
- Order: †Graptoloidea
- Infraorder: †Neograptina
- Superfamily: †Retiolitoidea
- Family: †Neodiplograptidae; Melchin et al., 2011

Extinct family of graptolites

Neodiplograptidae is an extinct family of graptolites.

== Genera ==
List of genera from the Treatise on Invertebrate Paleontology:

- †Korenograptus Melchin et al., 2011
- †Metabolograptus Obut & Sennikov, 1985
- †Neodiplograptus Legrand, 1987
- †Paraclimacograptus Přibyl, 1948b
- †Rickardsograptus Melchin et al., 2011

=== Uncertain genera ===
- †Anjigraptus Muir et al., 2021
- †Cystograptus Hundt, 1942
- †Cameragraptus Hundt, 1953
