= Yuknessia =

Yuknessia Temporal range: Drumian, 508–507 Ma

Scientific classification
- Kingdom: Animalia
- Phylum: Hemichordata
- Genus: †Yuknessia; Walcott, 1919

Type species
- †Y. simplex Walcott, 1919

Species
- †Y. simplex Walcott, 1919; †Y. stephenensis LoDuca et al., 2015

Genus of marine worm-like animals

Yuknessia is an early pterobranch, known from the Burgess Shale and the Wheeler Shale. Long, unbranched fronds emerge from a central holdfast-like body covered in small conical plates. 23 specimens of Yuknessia are known from the Greater Phyllopod bed, where they comprise < 0.1% of the community. The genus contains two species: the type species Y. simplex and Y. stephenensis. It was originally interpreted as a green alga, and has since been reinterpreted it as a colonial pterobranch.
