= Cyclograptidae =

Scientific classification
- Kingdom: Animalia
- Phylum: Hemichordata
- Class: Pterobranchia
- Subclass: Graptolithina
- Family: †Cyclograptidae; Bulman, 1938

Synonyms
- †Tuboidea Kozlowski 1938 sensu Kozlowsk 1949

Extinct family of graptolites

Cyclograptidae is an extinct family of graptolites.

== Genera ==
List of genera from Maletz (2014):

- ? †Alternograptus Bouček, 1956
- ? †Callodendrograptus Decker, 1945
- †Calycotubus Kozłowski, 1949
- †Camarotubus Mierzejewski, 2001
- †Conitubus Kozłowski, 1949
- †Cyclograptus Spencer, 1883
- †Dendrotubus Kozłowski, 1949
- †Discograptus Wiman, 1901
- †Dyadograptus Obut, 1960
- †Galeograptus Wiman, 1901
- †Kozlowskitubus Mierzejewski, 1978
- †Marsipograptus Ruedemann, 1936
- †Multitubus Skevington, 1963
- †Parvitubus Skevington, 1963
- †Reticulograptus Wiman, 1901
- †Rhiphidodendrum Kozłowski, 1949
- †Rodonograptus Počta, 1894
- †Siberiodendrum Obut, 1964
- †Syrriphidograptus Poulsen, 1924
- †Tubidendrum Kozłowski, 1949
