= Phyllograptidae =

Phyllograptidae Temporal range: Floian–Darriwilian

Scientific classification
- Missing taxonomy template (fix): Phyllograptidae

Extinct family of graptolites

Phyllograptidae is an extinct family of graptolites from the Floian to Darriwilian epochs of the Ordovician Period.

== Genera ==
List of genera from Maletz (2014):

- †Corymbograptus Obut & Sobolevskaya, 1964
- †Paratetragraptus Obut, 1957
- †Pendeograptus Bouček & Přibyl, 1951
- †Phyllograptus Hall, 1858
- †Pseudophyllograptus Cooper & Fortey, 1982
- †Pseudotrigonograptus Mu & Lee, 1958
- †Tetragraptus Salter, 1863
- †Tristichograptus Jackson & Bulman, 1970
