= Monograptoidea =

Monograptoidea Temporal range: Hirnantian-Pragian Possible early Emsian record

Scientific classification
- Kingdom: Animalia
- Phylum: Hemichordata
- Class: Pterobranchia
- Subclass: Graptolithina
- Order: †Graptoloidea
- Infraorder: †Neograptina
- Superfamily: †Monograptoidea; Lapworth, 1873

Families
- †Dimorphograptidae; †Monograptidae

Extinct superfamily of animals

Monograptoidea is a superfamily of graptolites that includes the Dimorphograptidae and the Monograptidae.

== Phylogeny ==
From Melchin et al. (2011).

- - Normalograptus (paraphyletic)
  - Metaclimacograptus (paraphyletic)
  - Hirsutograptus
  - Monograptoidea
    - Avitograptus
    - - Akidograptus
      - - Bulmanograptus
        - Monograptidae
          - Atavograptus (paraphyletic)
          - other monograptids
  - Retiolitoidea
