= Atubaria =

Scientific classification
- Kingdom: Animalia
- Phylum: Hemichordata
- Class: Pterobranchia
- Order: Cephalodiscida
- Family: Atubaridae; Benito, 1982
- Genus: Atubaria; Sato, 1936
- Species: A. heterolopha

Binomial name
- Atubaria heterolopha Sato, 1936

Genus of hemichordates in the pterobranchian class

Atubaria heterolopha is a species of hemichordates in the monotypic genus Atubaria and in the monotypic family Atubaridae. This taxon belongs to the pterobranchian order Cephalodiscida. It was described by Tadao Sato in 1936 from specimens found feeding on a colony of the hydrozoan Dycoryne conferta in Sagami Bay, Japan.

== Description ==
The characteristics of this pterobranch species include a 1–5 mm long zooid, a collar with four pairs of tentaculated arms, a single pair of pharyngeal slits, and a solitary and sedentary behaviour. It closely resembles Cephalodiscus members.
