= Cysticamaridae =

Scientific classification
- Kingdom: Animalia
- Phylum: Hemichordata
- Class: Pterobranchia
- Subclass: Graptolithina
- Family: †Cysticamaridae; Bulman, 1955

Synonyms
- †Camaroidea Kozlowski 1928 sensu Kozlowski 1949

Extinct family of graptolites

Cysticamaridae is an extinct family of graptolites.

== Genera ==
List of genera from Maletz (2014):

- †Bithecocamara Kozłowski, 1949
- †Cysticamara Kozłowski, 1949
- †Erecticamara Mierzejewski, 2000
- †Flexicollicamara Kozłowski, 1949
- †Graptocamara Kozłowski, 1949
- †Syringataenia Obut, 1953
- †Tubicamara Kozłowski, 1949
