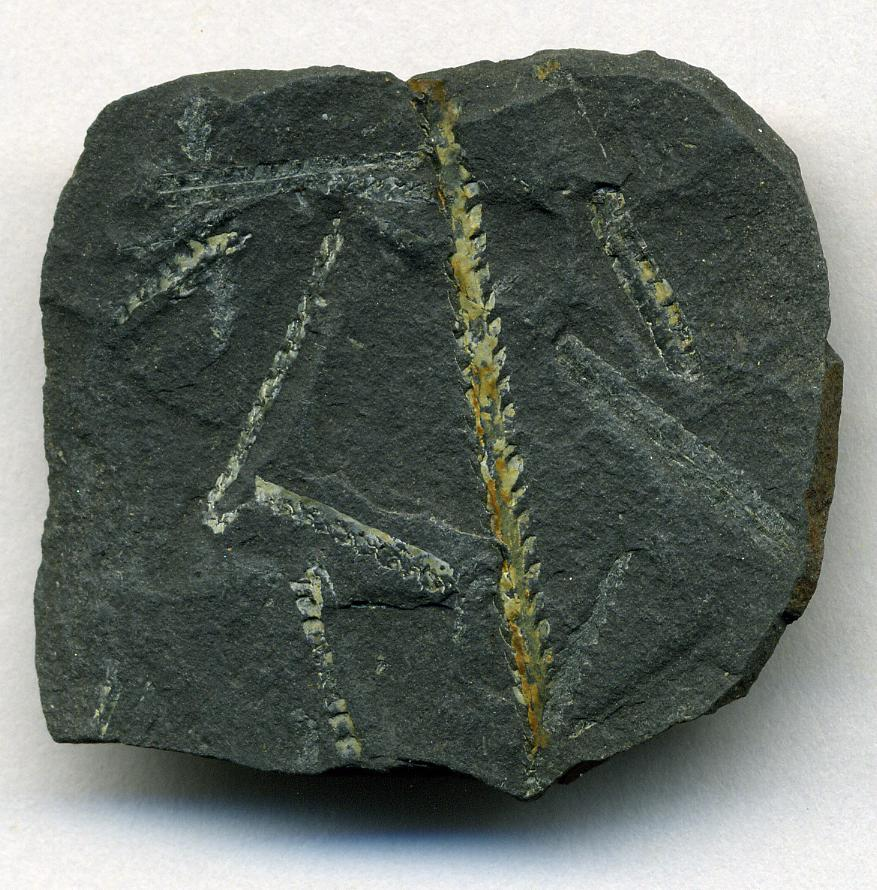
- Climacograptus wilsoni, from Dob's Linn, Scotland

Scientific classification
- Kingdom: Animalia
- Phylum: Hemichordata
- Class: Pterobranchia
- Subclass: Graptolithina
- Order: †Graptoloidea
- Family: †Climacograptidae
- Genus: †Climacograptus; Hall, 1865

= Climacograptus =

Genus of marine worm-like animals

Climacograptus is an Ordovician genus of graptolites.
