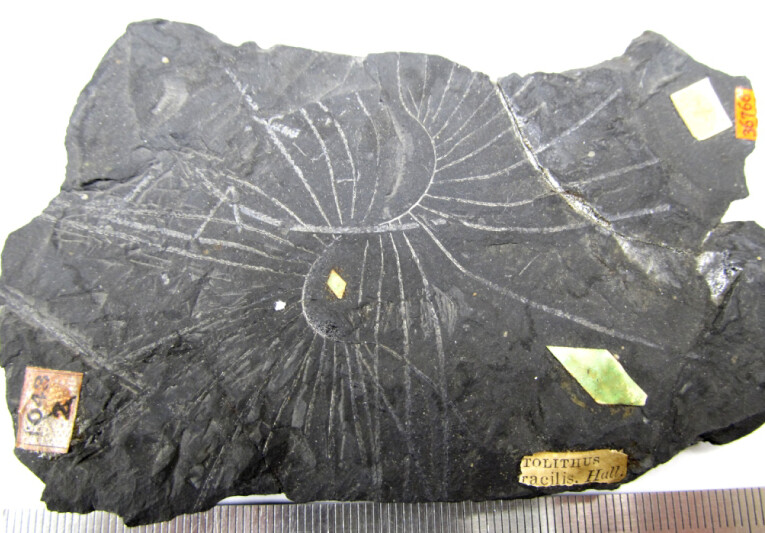
- Nemagraptus gracilis from the Mount Moreno Shale from Albany, NY. Scale bar at bottom in mm.

Scientific classification
- Kingdom: Animalia
- Phylum: Hemichordata
- Class: Pterobranchia
- Subclass: Graptolithina
- Order: †Graptoloidea
- Family: †Dicranograptidae
- Genus: †Nemagraptus; Emmons, 1855

Type species
- †Nemagraptus gracilis (J. Hall, 1847)

Species
- †Nemagraptus gracilis (J. Hall, 1847); †Nemagraptus subtilis Hadding, 1913; †Nemagraptus explanatus (Lapworth, 1876); †Nemagraptus explanatus explanatus (Lapworth, 1876); †Nemagraptus explanatus pertenuis (Lapworth, 1876); †Nemagraptus linmassiae Finney, 1985

= Nemagraptus =

Nemagraptus Temporal range: Darriwilian–Sandbian, ~469.42–452.72 Ma

Extinct genus of graptolites

Nemagraptus is an extinct genus of graptolites which had an almost worldwide distribution during the Darriwilian and Sandbian (Ordovician).

== History ==
Nemagraptus gracilis was first collected from the Hudson River Shale and Normanskill Formation of New York State in 1843, and Hall (1847) assigned the species to Graptolithus as G. gracilis using specimen YPM IP 020351 as the paralectotype and specimen AMNH 30458 as the lectotype. Emmons (1855) created the genus Nemagraptus for another species, N. elegans. Törnquist identified the first record of N. gracilis in Europe in 1865, and Elles and Wood (1904) moved G. gracilis into Nemagraptus, synonymising N. elegans with N, gracilis in the process. Three-dimensional remains belonging to N. gracilis were identified in 2007 from boreholes across Latvia and Estonia.

Hadding (1913) named and described Nemagraptus subtilis as the second species assigned to the Nemagraptus genus. He identified the species based on specimens found in the Dicellograptus shale sequence in Skåne County, Sweden between 1910 and 1912.

Starting with Bergström et al. (2000), the lower boundary of the Sandbian was defined as the first appearance datum of N. gracilis in that section.

== Distribution ==
Nemagraptus has been identified from: Argentina, Bolivia, Canada, China, Czech Republic, England, Estonia, Kazakhstan, Latvia, New Zealand, Peru, Sweden, the United States, and Wales.

== Description ==
It lived in deep water environments. The thecae possess considerable overlap, and it has isolated metasicula as the main synapomorphy.

Nemagraptus was a colony-forming organism with two s-shaped branches, which in turn split into several short branches.

== Classification ==
Nemagraptus is a graptolite and has been classified into the family Dicranograptidae and the subfamily Nemagraptinae.
