= Sheinwoodian =

Age on the geologic timescale

- 432.9 ± 1.2 – 430.6 ± 1.3 Ma
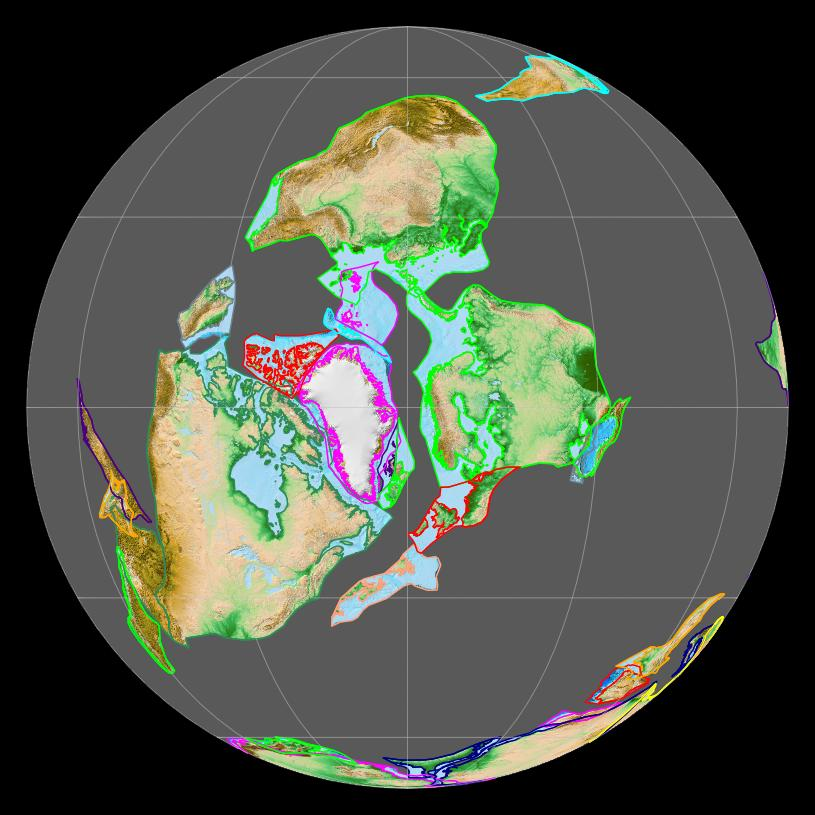
- Paleogeography of the late Sheinwoodian

Chronology
← / Lau event; ← / Mulde event; ← / Ireviken event
Subdivision of the Silurian according to the ICS, as of 2024. Vertical axis scale: Millions of years ago

Etymology
- Name formality: Formal
- Name ratified: 1980

Usage information
- Celestial body: Earth
- Regional usage: Global (ICS)
- Time scale(s) used: ICS Time Scale

Definition
- Chronological unit: Age
- Stratigraphic unit: Stage
- Time span formality: Formal
- Lower boundary definition: Imprecise. Currently placed between acritarch biozone 5 and LAD of Pterospathodus amorphognathoides. See Llandovery for more info.
- Lower boundary definition candidates: A conodont boundary (Ireviken datum 2) which is close to the murchisoni graptolite biozone.
- Lower boundary GSSP candidate section(s): None
- Lower boundary GSSP: Hughley Brook, Apedale, UK; 52.5811°N 2.6389°W
- Lower GSSP ratified: 1980
- Upper boundary definition: FAD of the graptolite Cyrtograptus lundgreni
- Upper boundary GSSP: Sheinton Brook, Homer, England; 52.6156°N 2.5647°W
- Upper GSSP ratified: 1980

In the geologic timescale, the Sheinwoodian is the age of the Wenlock Epoch of the Silurian Period of the Paleozoic Era of the Phanerozoic Eon that is comprehended between 432.9 ± 1.2 Ma and 430.6 ± 1.3 Ma (million years ago), approximately. The Sheinwoodian Age succeeds the Telychian Age and precedes the Homerian Age.

== Definition ==
The Wenlock-Llandovery boundary is defined by the first occurrence of Cyrtograptus centrifugus. The stage is named after Sheinwood village, north of Much Wenlock. The Buildwas Formation of Shropshire, United Kingdom contains the type section.
