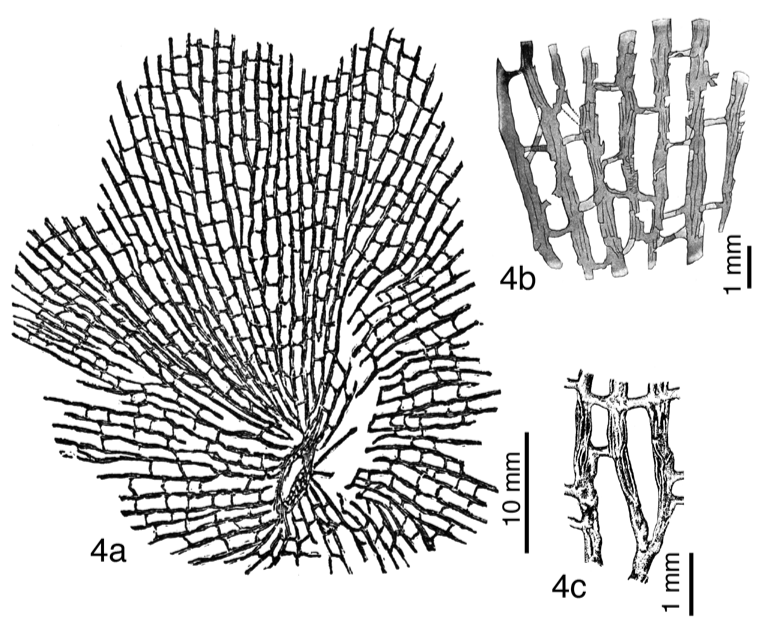
- a-b: Holotype of Dictyonema retiforme c: Stipe fragment of Dictyonema graptolithorum

Scientific classification
- Kingdom: Animalia
- Phylum: Hemichordata
- Class: Pterobranchia
- Subclass: Graptolithina
- Order: †Dendroidea
- Family: †Callograptidae
- Genus: †Dictyonema; Hall, 1851

Synonyms
- Dictyograptus Hopkinson 1875; Pseudodictyonema Bouček, 1957

= Dictyonema (graptolite) =

Dictyonema Temporal range: Silurian–Carboniferous Possible Miaolingian record

Genus of dendroid graptolite

Dictyonema is a genus of dendroid graptolite. While initially thought to be a bridge between dendroid and graptoloid graptolites due to its seeming to possess dissepiments, Dictyonema is now understood to be an acanthograptid with a unique style of 'thecal bridges' where thecae from one stipe cross over to adjacent stipes.

== Description ==
=== Dictyonema sensu stricto ===
Dictyonema is a genus of callograptid which can reach large sizes, with a specimen of D. retiforme having dimensions of roughly 120 × 130 mm. The genus is distinct because of its mesh-like structure, formed by thecal bridges that occur when one or multiple thecae on one stipe cross over to an adjacent stipe.

The tubaria of Dictyonema are conical or fan-shaped and are composed of many straight, subparallel or parallel stipes radiating outwards. The stipes frequently branch by bifurcating and usually maintain their width before and after branching. In species with conical tubaria, the tubarium can range from almost cylindrical to flattened and nearly disk-shaped.

Dictyonema, like other callograptids, has ropy-looking compound stipes formed by multiple tubular thecae. However, unlike Ordovician callograptids, the thecae of Dictyonema do not extend laterally to form 'twigs,' making differentiating between true callograptid Dictyonema and dendrograptid 'Dictyonema' with simple stipes extremely difficult. The thecal apertures of Dictyonema are isolated and oriented ventrally (towards the center of the colony). Triad budding is possible, but there is no morphological differentiation between autothecae and 'bithecae'.

=== "Dictyonema" sensu lato ===
There are several species of 'Dictyonema' with simple dendrograptid thecae and dissepiments (e.g. 'D'. cotyledon, 'D'. peltatum, and 'D'. rarum) that will need to be moved to a different genus. In these taxa, bithecae are easily determined from autothecae and dissepiments are constructed from fusellar and cortical material secreted by the zooids of adjacent bithecae without any thecae crossing over to adjacent stipes.

== Species ==
Dictyonema (sensu stricto) (=Pseudodictyonema)

- Type species D. retiforme (Hall, 1843)
- D. fournieri (Ubaghs, 1941)
- D. graptolithorum Počta, 1894
- D. carboniferus (Hind, 1907)
- D. crassum Girty, 1894
- D. crassibasale Bassler, 1909
- D. giganteum (Bouček, 1957)
- D. dilatatum (Bouček, 1957)
- D. heyi (Chapman, Rickards, and Grayson, 1993)
