= Invertebrate mitochondrial code =

Alternative genetic code in some invertebrates

The invertebrate mitochondrial code (translation table 5) is a genetic code used by the mitochondrial genome of invertebrates. Mitochondria contain their own DNA and reproduce independently from their host cell. Variation in translation of the mitochondrial genetic code occurs when DNA codons result in non-standard amino acids has been identified in invertebrates, most notably arthropods. This variation has been helpful as a tool to improve upon the phylogenetic tree of invertebrates, like flatworms.

== The code ==
AAs = FFLLSSSSYY**CCWWLLLLPPPPHHQQRRRRIIMMTTTTNNKKSSSSVVVVAAAADDEEGGGG
Starts = ---M----------------------------MMMM---------------M------------
Base1 = TTTTTTTTTTTTTTTTCCCCCCCCCCCCCCCCAAAAAAAAAAAAAAAAGGGGGGGGGGGGGGGG
Base2 = TTTTCCCCAAAAGGGGTTTTCCCCAAAAGGGGTTTTCCCCAAAAGGGGTTTTCCCCAAAAGGGG
Base3 = TCAGTCAGTCAGTCAGTCAGTCAGTCAGTCAGTCAGTCAGTCAGTCAGTCAGTCAGTCAGTCAG

Bases: adenine (A), cytosine (C), guanine (G) and thymine (T) or uracil (U).

Amino acids: Alanine (Ala, A), Arginine (Arg, R), Asparagine (Asn, N), Aspartic acid (Asp, D), Cysteine (Cys, C), Glutamic acid (Glu, E), Glutamine (Gln, Q), Glycine (Gly, G), Histidine (His, H), Isoleucine (Ile, I), Leucine (Leu, L), Lysine (Lys, K), Methionine (Met, M), Phenylalanine (Phe, F), Proline (Pro, P), Serine (Ser, S), Threonine (Thr, T), Tryptophan (Trp, W), Tyrosine (Tyr, Y), Valine (Val, V).

== Differences from the standard code ==
DNA codons	RNA codons	This code (5)	Standard code (1)
AGA	AGA	Ser (S)	Arg (R)
AGG	AGG	Ser (S)	Arg (R)
ATA	AUA	Met (M)	Ile (I)
TGA	UGA	Trp (W)	STOP = Ter (*)

Note: The codon AGG is absent in Drosophila.

=== Alternative initiation codons ===
- ATA/AUA
- ATT/AUU
- ATC/AUC: Apis
- GTG/GUG: Polyplacophora
- TTG/UUG: Ascaris, Caenorhabditis.

== Systematic range ==
- Nematoda: Ascaris, Caenorhabditis;
- Mollusca: Bivalvia); Polyplacophora;
- Arthropoda/Crustacea: Artemia;
- Arthropoda/Insecta: Drosophila [Locusta migratoria (migratory locust), Apis mellifera (honeybee)].

== Other variations ==
- Several arthropods translate the codon AGG as lysine instead of serine (as in the Pterobranchia Mitochondrial Code) or arginine (as in the standard genetic code).
- GUG may possibly function as an initiator in Drosophila. AUU is not used as an initiator in Mytilus
- "An exceptional mechanism must operate for initiation of translation of the cytochrome oxidase subunit I mRNA in both D. melanogaster and D. yakuba, since its only plausible initiation codon, AUA, is out of frame with the rest of the gene. Initiation appears to require the "reading" of an AUAA quadruplet, which would be equivalent to initiation at AUA followed immediately by a specific ribosomal frameshift. Another possible mechanism ... is that the mRNA is "edited" to bring the AUA initiation into frame."

== See also ==
- List of genetic codes
