= Homerian =

Fifth stage of the Silurian

- 430.6 ± 1.3 – 426.7 ± 1.5 Ma
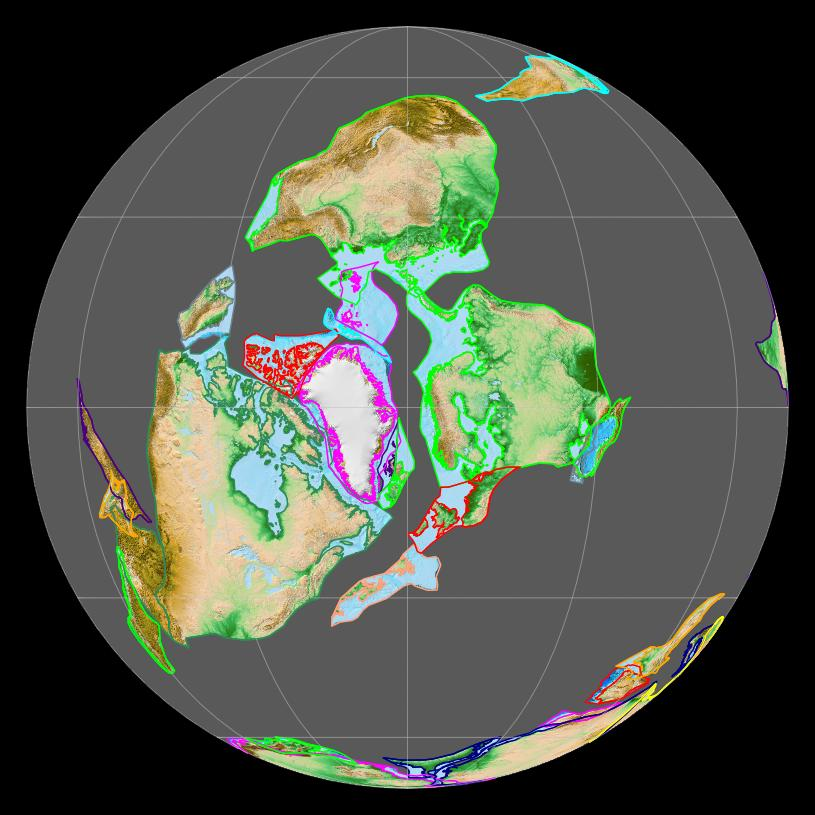
- Paleogeography of the Homerian, 430 Ma

Chronology
← / Lau event; ← / Mulde event; ← / Ireviken event
Subdivision of the Silurian according to the ICS, as of 2023. Vertical axis scale: Millions of years ago

Etymology
- Name formality: Formal
- Name ratified: 1980

Usage information
- Celestial body: Earth
- Regional usage: Global (ICS)
- Time scale(s) used: ICS Time Scale

Definition
- Chronological unit: Age
- Stratigraphic unit: Stage
- Time span formality: Formal
- Lower boundary definition: FAD of the graptolite Cyrtograptus lundgreni
- Lower boundary GSSP: Sheinton Brook, Homer, England; 52.6156°N 2.5647°W
- Lower GSSP ratified: 1980
- Upper boundary definition: FAD of the graptolite Saetograptus (Colonograptus) varians
- Upper boundary GSSP: Pitch Coppice, Ludlow, U.K. 52.3592°N 2.7772°W
- Upper GSSP ratified: 1980

In the geologic timescale, the Homerian is an age of the Wenlock Epoch of the Silurian Period of the Paleozoic Era of the Phanerozoic Eon that is comprehended between 430.6 ± 1.3 Ma and 426.7 ± 1.5 Ma (million years ago), approximately. The Homerian Age succeeds the Sheinwoodian Age and precedes the Gorstian Age.

The name comes from the small village of Homer, Shropshire near Much Wenlock. The defining lower boundary of Homerian rock layers (GSSP) is located within the Coalbrookdale Formation of England.
