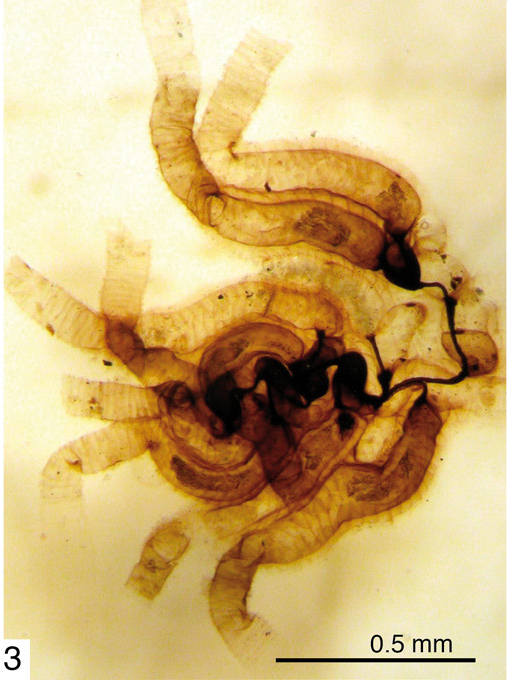
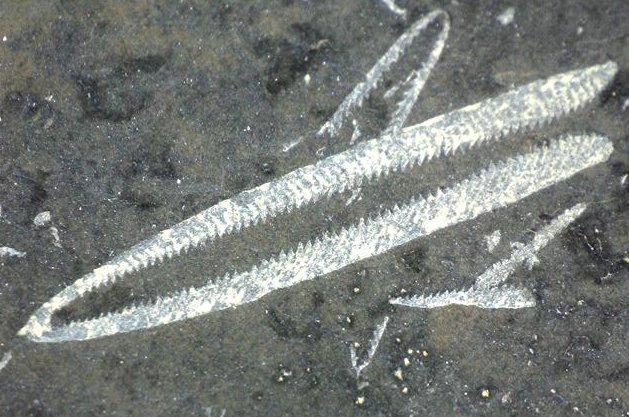
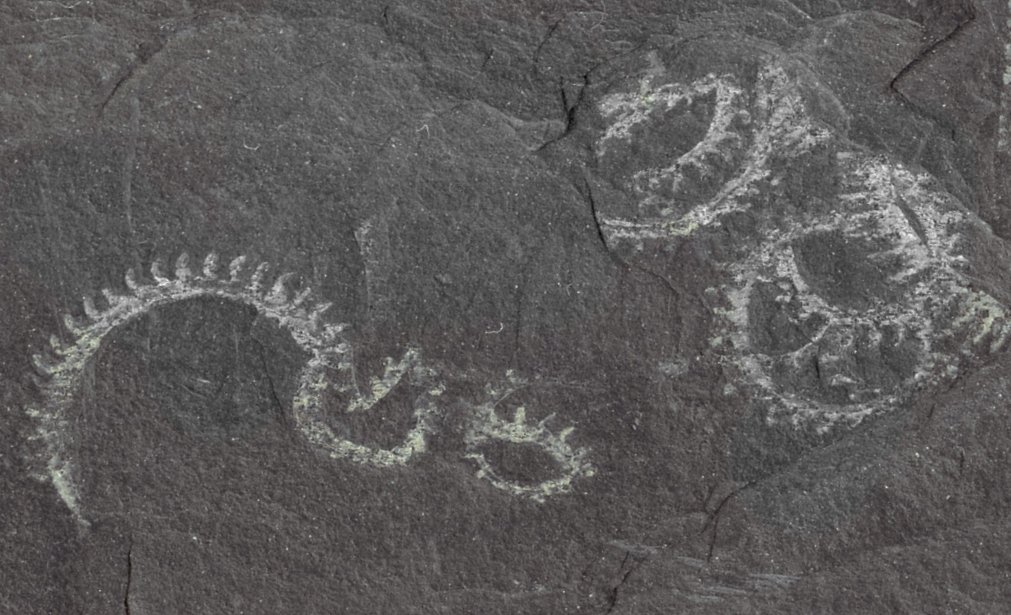
- A collection of graptolites. Clockwise from top left: Rhabdopleura compacta, an extant rhabdopleurid, Didymograptus murchisoni, an Ordovician graptoloid, Oktavites spiralis, a Silurian graptoloid, and Dictyonema sp., a Silurian dendroid.

Scientific classification
- Kingdom: Animalia
- Phylum: Hemichordata
- Class: Pterobranchia
- Subclass: Graptolithina; Bronn, 1849

Subgroups
- Family Rhabdopleuridae; Family †Cysticamaridae; Family †Wimanicrustidae; Family †Cyclograptidae; Family †Dithecodendridae; Order †Dendroidea; Order †Graptoloidea

= Graptolite =

Graptolites Temporal range: Early Cambrian–Present Survive to the present via the genus Rhabdopleura. No other genera known past the Permian (Roadian).

Subclass of Pterobranchs in the phylum Hemichordata

Graptolites ("writing in the rocks") are a group of colonial organisms in the phylum Hemichordata and the class Pterobranchia belonging to the subclass Graptolithina. The earliest graptolites evolved at the beginning of the Cambrian period and were attached to the seabed (benthic), forming either encrusting or erect, branching colonies. At the beginning of the Ordovician period some erect benthic forms evolved into the planktonic Graptoloidea, which dominated open-ocean ecosystems until their extinction in the Early Devonian. Today, the only living graptolites are members of the benthic, encrusting genus Rhabdopleura. Graptolites construct housings called tubaria, which are made up of interconnected living tubes called thecae and are typically the only portions of the colony that are fossilized. Each theca is constructed by a zooid (an individual of the colony) out of stacked growth increments called fuselli. All graptolite colonies have zooids connected by a network of stalks called the stolon system and originate from a housing created by the first zooid called a sicula.

Historically, graptolites were interpreted as cnidarians belonging to Anthozoa or Hydrozoa, or as bryozoans. However, Polish paleontologist Roman Kozłowski's discovery of the stolon system and fusellar structure in chemically isolated specimens allowed him to determine that graptolites were related to the Pterobranchia. A cladistic analysis published in 2012 showed that the pterobranch genus Rhabdopleura is a living graptolite, as it has a stolon system and a sicula. The other extant pterobranch genus, Cephalodiscus, does not have a stolon system or a sicula and, as a result, is not a graptolite.

Graptolites are used for a wide range of geological applications, and the planktonic Graptoloidea are especially important in biostratigraphy of Ordovician-Lower Devonian marine strata. In addition, graptoloids can be used to determine the directions of paleocurrents, while the color of graptolite fusellum can be used to determine the thermal maturity of their host rocks.

== Etymology ==
Both the word "graptolite" and the name for the subclass Graptolithina are derived from the genus name Graptolithus Linnaeus, 1735, which in turn originates from the Greek words grapho "write" and lithos "stone." As a result, "graptolite" roughly translates to "writing in the rocks", which later became the title of a popular book on the fossils.

== History of research ==
=== Early research ===
The first description of a possible graptolite fossil was published in Magnus von Bromell's 1727 work Lithographiæ Suecanæ, where he noted a "swinestone" rock with an imprint of a "branched moss" (likely a specimen of Rhabdinopora flabelliformis) and "leafy impressions" in a "black fissile rock" that probably represented graptolites in shale. However, von Bromell did not figure his specimens.

Carl Linnaeus's original drawing of Graptolithus in his 1751 work Skånska resa

The second person to describe graptolites was the "great systematist" Carl Linnaeus, who conferred the name Graptolithus to dendrites and other markings that were widely accepted to not be fossils in the first edition of his Systema Naturae. Indeed, in the twelfth edition of the Systema Naturae, Linnaeus wrote "a fossil, properly speaking, is not a graptolite." However, in his 1751 work Skånska resa, Linnaeus figured and described specimens, under the description of a "Fossil or Graptolite, of a strange kind," of what are now considered graptolites. Today, these specimens are considered to represent the graptoloids Normalograptus scalaris and Demirastrites triangulatus, both of which are common from the locality where he collected the slab. Linnaeus divided Graptolithus into many species in the twelfth edition of the Systema Naturae, including one species (Graptolithus scalaris, now Normalograptus scalaris) that was identical to the form described in the Skånska resa.

The first authors to recognize that graptolites actually represented fossils were Johann E.I. Walch, who in 1771 described two species (now Lituigraptus convolutus and Monograptus priodon) as miniature cephalopods, and Göran Wahlenberg, who in 1821 recognized that Graptolithus scalaris Linnaeus represented the fossils of an animal. While Wahlenberg agreed that most species of Graptolithus were not fossils, he chose to use the name to represent the true fossils allied to G. scalaris, and set G. scalaris as the type species of Graptolithus. Like Walch, Wahlenberg believed that Graptolithus were the fossils of tiny, unmineralized cephalopods related to Orthoceratites. Wahlenberg's work drew attention to graptolite fossils, and future paleontologists would use the names "Graptolithus" and "graptolite" exclusively to refer to graptolites in Wahlenberg's sense. Over the next several decades, numerous authors would describe species of Graptolithus and would provide interpretations of the graptolites as cephalopods, hydrozoans, corals, plants, and even foraminiferans.

The Graptolithina was formally named in 1849 by Heinrich G. Bronn as a group within the Anthozoa. Frederick M'Coy erected the family Graptolitidae in 1850 as the first family in the Graptolithina and, in the same paper, divided graptolites into two genera: Graptolithus for species with a single row of thecae (uniserial) and Diplograpsis (now Diplograptus) for species with two rows of thecae (biserial), taking the first step in graptolite taxonomy. The first members of the Dendroidea were discovered in the 1850s, with Prout (1851)'s description of Graptolithus hallianus (now Dendrograptus hallianus) and Hall (1851)'s description of the genus Dictyonema.

In an 1852 monograph, Hanns B. Geinitz created the name Monograpsus (now Monograptus) for uniserial graptolites and suggested discarding the genus Graptolithus as the word 'graptolite' was being used for all graptolites. This was supported by Charles Lapworth, who in an 1876 paper elected to use Monograptus over Graptolithus for uniserial graptolites, and by R. R. Gurley in an 1896 paper on North American graptolites, and the name Graptolithus subsequently fell into disuse. In 1954, the ICZN finally suppressed the genus Graptolithus Linnaeus, 1768 and the name Graptolithus scalaris Linnaeus, 1768.

=== Advances in taxonomy, morphology, and stratigraphy ===
The monographs of Joachim Barrande (1850) on Bohemian graptolites and James Hall (1847, 1865) on North American graptolites laid the foundation for the research of graptolites. Barrande, in his 1850 monograph Graptolites de Bohême, described the structure of graptolites in detail and argued against a cephalopod affinity for the Graptolithina, suggesting that they instead represented corals related to the Pennatulacea. Barrande also hypothesized on the mode of life of graptolites, suggesting that uniserial forms were planktonic while biserial forms had their proximal end buried in the seabed. Hall's 1847 monograph Graptolites of the Inferior Strata of the New York System mainly described new species, but his 1865 monograph The Graptolites of the Quebec Group revised the classification of the Graptolithina and described the structure of graptolites in further detail. Hall (1865) suggested that both biserial and uniserial graptolites were planktonic, while dendroid graptolites were rooted onto the seabed.

Charles Lapworth ushered in the study of graptolites for biostratigraphic purposes with his 1878 publication The Moffat Series, in which he established a series of Early Silurian biozones based on graptolites and used them to successfully interpret the geological structure of the Southern Uplands. Lapworth further recognized that graptolites were "unsurpassed" worldwide for early Palaeozoic biostratigraphy, which was confirmed by the North American graptolite biozones established by Rudolf Ruedemann's 1904 paper on the graptolites of New York. Graptolite faunas and biostratigraphy were described in detail in Britain by Gertrude L. Elles and Ethel M.R. Wood's monograph (1904-18) on British graptoloids and Oliver M.B. Bulman's monograph (1927-67) on British dendroids, and in North America by Rudolf Ruedemann's 1947 monograph The Graptolites of North America.

Reconstruction of "Diplograptus pristis" (now Orthograptus quadrimucronatus) in Ruedemann (1895).

Rudolf Ruedemann, in his 1895 paper Development and the mode of growth of Diplograptus M’Coy, reconstructed synrhabdosomes (aggregations of radially arranged colonies) of "Diplograptus pristis" (now Orthograptus quadrimucronatus) as being joined by a central disc and possessing a gas-filled float called a pneumatophore and four sac-like structures called gonangia. This reconstruction has become widespread and has been copied by papers, textbooks, museum displays, and on the Internet. However, it is unsupported, as the central disc, pneumatophore, and gonangia are not present in the specimens from which he based his reconstruction and have not been found in any other fossils. Ruedemann initially used his interpretation of the pneumatophore and gonangia to argue for a hydrozoan affinity for the Graptolithina, but later decided that graptolites were primitive bryozoans. His opinion was based on the bilateral symmetry (in contrast to the radial symmetry of hydroid thecae) and mode of budding of the thecae, as well as the presence of circular marks interpreted as muscle scars. Similar marks were interpreted as muscle scars in the Monograptidae, but instead represent the thickened bases of the interthecal septum.

=== Isolated specimens and affinities ===
The first studies of chemically isolated graptolites were performed by Karl Wilhelm Gümbel, who in 1878 described isolated specimens of Monograptus priodon. However, Gerhard Holm's 1895 paper on isolated specimens of Didymograptus, Tetragraptus, and Phyllograptus was far more influential and is regarded as a "milestone in graptolite research", as it provided important information on the structure of graptolites. Carl Wiman's 1895 thesis Ueber die Graptolithen provided similarly important results through the study of isolated fossils and serial sections of both graptoloid and dendroid graptolites.

In 1931, a diverse Tremadocian fauna of graptolites was discovered by the Polish paleontologist Roman S.J. Kozłowski, who was able to isolate the specimens from the surrounding matrix using hydrofluoric acid. Kozłowski presented a preliminary report on his observations in 1938 but, due to the onset of World War II, was only able to publish his full monograph in 1949. Kozłowski's fauna included a diverse array of benthic graptolites, including both the erect Dendroidea and three new orders of encrusting graptolites: the Camaroidea (now Cysticamaridae), the Tuboidea (now Cyclograptidae), and the Stolonoidea (now thought to be stolons of Rhabdopleuridae). In addition, the exceptional preservation of the material allowed Kozłowski to discover the stolon system and the fusellar construction of the tubarium, and based on these new observations, Kozłowski determined that the Graptolithina were hemichordates closely related to pterobranchs.

One difference that Kozłowski noted between extant pterobranchs and graptolites was the presence of a layered cortex on the exterior of the tubarium. Kozłowski suggested that the cortex was secreted by an epithelial layer on the outside of the theca (the extrathecal tissue model), which was supported by workers such as Nancy H. Kirk as well as by Oliver Bulman (though with reservations) in his 1970 edition of the Treatise on Invertebrate Paleontology. However, the independent discovery of cortical bandages by Andres (1977) and Crowther & Rickards (1977) proved that cortex was not a simple layered structure but was instead 'plastered' onto the surface of the theca by a pterobranch-like zooid, thus making the extrathecal tissue model unnecessary.

Peter N. Dilly's 1993 description of Cephalodiscus graptolitoides as a living graptolite sparked excitement, with some authors accepting C. graptolitoides as a living graptolite and others preferring to keep it within the Pterobranchia. The prevailing view at the time was that Pterobranchia was a monophyletic taxon and the sister taxon to the Graptolithina. However, a cladistic analysis published in 2012 by Charles E. Mitchell and others showed that Pterobranchia included the graptolites and that Rhabdopleura, rather than Cephalodiscus, was a living graptolite.

== Morphology ==
Key parts of the graptolite tubarium. (1) Isograptus mobergi showing two reclined stipes and overlapping thecae connected by the common canal. (2) Rhabdopleura normani showing zooids, thecal tubes, and the stolon. (3) Heisograptus macropoma showing a theca constructed out of fuselli.

All graptolites are colonial organisms composed of numerous individual animals called zooids, which are all connected by a stalk-like structure called the stolon. The zooids secrete an organic housing composed of the interconnected living tubes (called thecae) of the individual zooids. Historically, this housing was called the coenecium for living pterobranchs and the rhabdosome for fossil graptolites, but in recent literature, the term tubarium, originally suggested by E. R. Lankester in 1884 for the housing constructions of the extant genus Rhabdopleura, is most widely used. Graptolite colonies develop from the sicula, which is the housing for the first zooid of the colony and the only zooid produced through sexual reproduction. Parts of the tubarium, stipes, or thecae are frequently described as proximal or distal: proximal refers to parts that are formed early and are closer to the prosicula (the initial portion of the sicula and the first secreted structure of the tubarium), while distal refers to parts that are formed late and are farther from the prosicula.

=== Colony shape ===
The graptolite tubarium is composed of branches called stipes, which in turn are composed of interconnected thecal tubes budding from either a stem or a common canal. However, graptolite colonies can form diverse sheet-like forms in encrusting colonies and bushy, fan-like, or conical forms in erect benthic and planktonic taxa. Encrusting graptolites form two-dimensional colonies over surfaces and can exhibit high levels of variation, depending on the shape of the substrate. Encrusting graptolite colonies may be thigmophyllic or 'touch-loving' (as in extant Rhabdopleura compacta and the Cysticamaridae), where the tubaria form dense masses of thecal tubes in close contact with each other, or may form runner-type colonies (as in extant Rhabdopleura normani and the Wimanicrustidae), where the tubaria loosely cover large areas and the individual thecal tubes are widely spaced and thus never touch.

Erect benthic taxa are multiramous (frequently branching) and can form three-dimensional, bushy colonies as in Dendrograptus or sheet-like colonies that can be curled to form a fan-like or conical shape. In the benthic Dendrograptidae and the planktonic graptoloids, the stipes are composed of a single row of serially arranged thecae with all their apertures oriented in one direction (the ventral side of the stipe), while in the Callograptidae the stipes can be more complicated with thecae oriented in multiple directions. Conical taxa typically had their stipes oriented so the thecal apertures were oriented towards the middle of the tubarium, while fan-like taxa had stipes oriented in the same direction and bushy taxa had variably oriented stipes.

Diagram illustrating the orientation of graptolite stipes to the nema and the terminology.

The earliest planktic taxa were conical or disk-shaped and multiramous, with their morphologies being modifications of the original conical shape of Rhabdinopora. Later forms became pauciramous (with 4 or fewer stipes) and took on a wide variety of shapes based on the inclination of the stipes with respect to the sicula. Scandent taxa, where the stipes grew straight up to enclose the sicula, can be uniserial (one-stiped) like the Monograptidae, biserial (two-stiped) like the other Axonophora and the Glossograptidae, or quadriserial (four-stiped) like some members of the Phyllograptidae.

The morphologies of graptolite tubaria are highly variable due to a variety of factors, including genetic controls on the construction of the tubarium as well as environmental conditions. Variation due to environmental factors is strongest in benthic graptolites. Graptoloid colonies show less ecological variation and have more symmetrical colonies, which may assist in maintaining a stable position in the water column.

=== Zooids ===
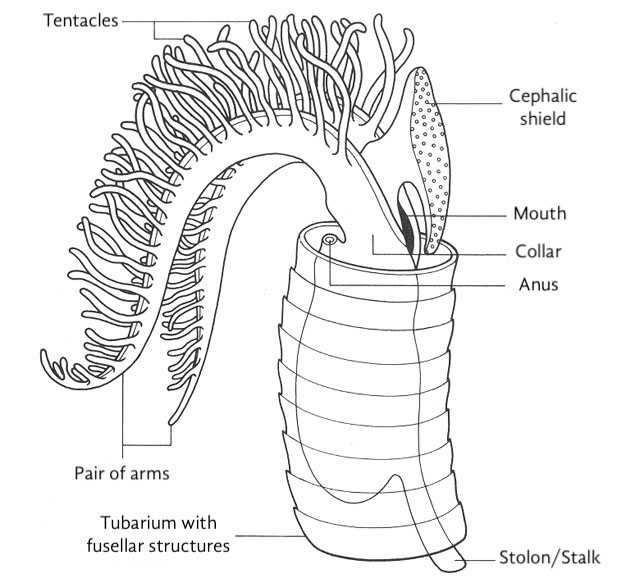
Diagram of a graptolite zooid based on the zooids of extant Rhabdopleura.

Understanding of graptolite zooids is mostly limited to the zooids of the living genus Rhabdopleura. Like in other hemichordates, the zooids of Rhabdopleura are divided into three portions: an anterior proboscis (also called the cephalic shield or the protosome), a collar (mesosome) bearing a single pair of arms, and a trunk (metasome). The cephalic shield is a flattened secretory organ that is used to construct the tubarium. The cephalic shield also contains a single coelomic cavity in the cephalic shield (the protocoel) that houses the stomochord and an anterior excretory complex (also called the heart-glomerulus complex) that is composed of the heart and a kidney-like bundle of blood vessels called a glomerulus. The mouth is immediately behind the cephalic shield and opens into the pharynx.

The collar of Rhabdopleura contains a pair of coelomic cavities (the mesocoels) that completely surround the pharynx. The mesocoels extend into a single set of paired arms (as opposed to the multiple pairs of arms in Cephalodiscus), with each arm bearing two rows of tentacles (which, in turn, possess three rows of hair-like cilia) formed from extensions of the arm coelom. The mesocoels also extend into a pair of ventral projections called oral lamellae, which bear a row of cilia that transports food from the arms to the mouth. The trunk of Rhabdopleura also contains paired coelomic cavities (the metacoels) surrounding the U-shaped gut and the single asymmetrically disposed gonad. Unlike all other hemichordates, Rhabdopleura completely lacks gill pores, but does possess a single pair of grooves that remain as traces of the lost gill pores. The muscular zooidal stalk originates from the posterior end of the trunk and connects the zooid to the stolon.

Traces of graptolite zooids are extremely rare in the fossil record, and usually do not show any details of anatomy. Pyrite blobs in the early Ordovician graptoloid Psigraptus and in early Silurian graptolites may represent the remains of decayed zooids, while remains of the zooidal stalks of the monograptids Rastrites geinitzii and Neolagarograptus sp. have been reported from the Silurian of Latvia. The best-preserved remains of zooids come from a specimen of the Cambrian rhabdopleurid Sphenoecium obuti, which preserves one arm and the cephalic shield of the zooid.

=== Stolon system ===
Stolon system in (1) Rhabdopleura normani, showing monopodial growth, and (2) Adelograptus tenellus, showing sympodial growth

The zooids of graptolites are connected by the stolon system, which is composed of the stolon proper and the zooidal stalk. The stolon itself is a connecting stalk that is divided into the pectocaulus or black stolon, which is coated in a black, sclerotized stolon sheath, and the gymnocaulus or naked stolon, which lacks a stolon sheath. In Rhabdopleura, the gymnocaulus is the stalk of the permanent terminal zooid and buds into new zooids before secreting the stolon sheath and becoming the pectocaulus, while in fossil taxa the gymnocaulus is unpreserved but likely also develops into the pectocaulus. The sclerotized pectocaulus is present in the erect benthic Dendroidea and most encrusting taxa, while in the planktonic graptoloids the entire stolon is unsclerotized and is considered the gymnocaulus. In taxa with a pectocaulus, the stolon system is rigid and often easily preservable in the fossil record, but in the graptoloids the stolon is not preserved.

Diaphragm complex of Rhabdopleura compacta

In Rhabdopleura and more derived graptolites such as the Wimanicrustidae, Cyclograptidae, and the Dendroidea, the pectocaulus of each zooid ends in a structure called a diaphragm complex, which may aid in the development of new zooids and serve as a protective case for developing zooids and for contracted adult zooids. The diaphragm complex is composed of the stolon diaphragm, a ring-like dividing wall on the inside of the stolon sheath, and an expanded, conical portion of the stolon sheath that forms the base of the developing theca. The stolon diaphragm has a central opening that the zooidal stalk passes through to connect to the stolon.

Graptolite colonies grow through the creation of new zooids, which occurs via asexual budding from the stolon. Stipes are lengthened along a growing axis, which may take the form of a stem or of a thecate stipe. The most primitive mode of growth for graptolites is monopodial growth, which is found in the living genus Rhabdopleura and is also known from the dithecodendrid Tarnagraptus. Monopodial growth is characterized by the presence of a permanent terminal zooid, which has a distinct bifid cephalic shield in Rhabdopleura, and by new zooids budding from the side of the growing axis and behind the permanent terminal zooid. In graptolites with monopodial growth, the permanent terminal zooid creates a stem, which can be encrusting (as in Rhabdopleura) or erect (as in Tarnagraptus), and the openings for new thecae are formed by resorption of part of the stem. In Rhabdopleura, the stems are divided by walls called transverse septa, which create compartments for the growth of new zooids.

Sympodial growth, which is characterized by new zooids (the daughter zooids) successively budding from the previous zooid (the mother zooid) at the tip of the growing axis, first evolved in the Furongian and is present in the erect benthic Dendroidea and their descendants, the planktonic Graptoloidea. In taxa with sympodial growth, there is no permanent terminal zooid; rather, each zooid acts as a temporary terminal zooid before creating additional zooids. Taxa with sympodial growth have thecae connected by a continuous cavity called a common canal which runs through the immature portions of all of the thecae in the colony and provides evidence of a truly colonial lifestyle.

=== Thecae ===
The thecae (sing. theca) are the individual living tubes of the zooids, and each theca is constructed and occupied by a single zooid. The initial parts of each theca are connected to the previous theca, forming branches called stipes. The individual thecae of each stipe are repetitive, clonal units that generally are either identical or grade between different thecal morphologies. The openings of the thecae are called thecal apertures and can be simple and round or can be modified, commonly with a tongue-like process on the dorsal or ventral sides of the thecal aperture called a rutellum.

Each zooid constructs its theca out of slightly overlapping, spindle-shaped growth increments called fuselli (sing. fusellus) that are secreted by the cephalic shield. The fuselli can be full rings or half rings, and the boundary between the wedge-like ends of fuselli forms an angled oblique suture. Fusellar full rings have a single oblique suture marking the start and end of secretion of the fusellum and can be irregularly oriented. Meanwhile, fusellar half rings are secreted in pairs to form one full ring, creating a dorsal and ventral suture on opposite sides of the theca. In taxa with fusellar half rings, the dorsal and ventral sutures are regularly placed to form dorsal and ventral zigzag sutures.

The thecae in encrusting graptolites like Rhabdopleura are composed of an creeping initial portion constructed out of fusellar half rings with a dorsal zigzag suture and an erect portion constructed out of fusellar full rings. The creeping tubes usually have a flattened and featureless ventral wall that contacts the substrate, while the erect tubes are isolated and typically have a circular cross section. In Rhabdopleura and some other rhabdopleurids, the erect tubes possess distinct protruding fusellar collars at the border between fuselli. Encrusting taxa often have thecae that branch irregularly from the creeping main stipe.

Morphology of simple (1) and hooked (2), serially arranged thecae showing protheca (in orange) and metatheca (in yellow)

In the Dendroidea and Graptoloidea, the stipes are fully erect branches composed of serially arranged thecae, with each theca budding from the previous one. The thecal apertures are all oriented towards the ventral side of the stipe, while the side of the stipe opposite to the thecal apertures is termed the dorsal side. The thecae in a stipe often overlap, forming a shared dorsal wall called an interthecal septum which can be constructed by either the zooid of the first theca or by both zooids.

The thecae of dendroids and graptoloids can be divided into two portions: the initial portion of the theca, called the protheca and the distal portion of the theca, the metatheca. The protheca is the portion of the theca that is constructed before the theca is fully differentiated and forms the wall of the common canal. Meanwhile, the metatheca is constructed after the theca is fully differentiated. In species with an interthecal septum, the start of the metatheca is marked by the beginning of the interthecal septum; however, in species without an interthecal septum, the start of the metatheca is instead marked by the point where the opening for the daughter theca is separated from the opening for the common canal.

==== Thecal types ====
Most graptolites have two main types of thecae: the autothecae, which are larger and are present in all graptolites, and the bithecae, which are present in most benthic graptolites (though not Rhabdopleura) but are absent in most of the planktonic graptoloids. Several theories were proposed to explain the purpose of bithecae, including that bithecae represented the thecal tubes of diminutive male zooids (and that their loss in Graptoloidea was associated with the evolution of hermaphroditic zooids) or, alternatively, that they represented the thecal tubes of specialized cleaning individuals. However, the purpose of bithecae is still unknown. The stolotheca was originally coined to represent the thecal tube surrounding the black stolon and was thought to give rise to both autothecae and bithecae. However, in Dendroidea and Graptoloidea, the stolotheca does not have a distinct zooid but instead represents the immature portion of the autotheca.

Morphology of graptolite stipes showing a bithecate stipe (1), a non-bithecate stipe with plaited thecal overlap (2), and a non-bithecate stipe with dorsal thecal origins (3). Bithecae in dark orange, autothecae in alternating light orange and white.

Both new autothecae and bithecae are created through budding from the stolon. In diad budding, which is present in most encrusting graptolites (like Rhabdopleura) and is the most primitive form of budding in graptolites, each budding event causes the stolon to bifurcate (split into two branches), creating two thecae at each division of the stolon. Diad budding is often irregular (for example, in Reticulograptus, one diad budding event can create any pair of autotheca, bitheca, and stolotheca other than two autothecae). However, the encrusting Wimanicrustidae and the erect branching Dendroidea evolved triad budding, where each budding event causes the stolon to trifurcate (split into three branches), creating three thecae at each division of the stolon. Triad budding follows a highly regular pattern called the Wiman rule, where each budding event creates one new autotheca (a 'stolotheca') on one side of the previous autotheca and a bitheca on the other side, and the origin of bithecae alternates between the left and right side of the stipe. The lateral origin of thecae in taxa with triad budding creates plaited thecal overlap, where alternating autothecae overlap each other laterally. Most graptoloids both lack bithecae and have autothecae originating from the dorsal edge of the stipe without plaited thecal overlap; however, some early graptoloids lack bithecae while still having lateral origins of thecae and plaited thecal overlap.

Several genera in the Cyclograptidae possess unique types of thecae that likely represent modified autothecae. Conothecae, which are known from Reticulograptus, Discograptus, and Epigraptus, are conical thecae that lack fusellar structures. Conothecae are modified autothecae and may ensure that autothecae are regularly spaced despite the irregular branching of the stolon. Microthecae, which are solely known from Tubidendrum, are modified autothecae with a narrow apertural "neck" and thecal apertures facing in the opposite direction from those of normal autothecae. Umbellate thecae, only known from Galeograptus, are modified autothecae close to the encrusting portion of the tubarium with an umbrella-shaped autothecal apparatus. The "umbrellas" of these thecae fuse with similar structures from adjacent stipes and stipes on the opposite side of the tubarium, completely covering the space between stipes.

==== Branching ====
Structure of the dicalycal theca in forms with triad budding and bithecae (1, 2) and without bithecae (3).

In Rhabdopleura and other graptolites with monopodial growth, branching occurs through the creation of a new permanent terminal zooid, which creates a new growing axis. However, in graptolites with sympodial growth, branching occurs through the creation of a dicalycal theca, which creates two new autothecae rather than one, in a process called dichotomous branching. In taxa with triad budding and bithecae, dichotomous branching occurs when the bitheca is replaced at the dicalycal theca with a second new autotheca. The process is similar in taxa which have lost bithecae, but the daughter thecae are offset rather than paired. In dichotomous branching, the two daughter stipes typically diverge at an identical angle from the mother stipe, though in some genera (e.g. Schizograptus and Trichograptus) one daughter stipe follows the direction of the mother stipe. Each dicalycal theca can only produce one additional dicalycal theca at most, and in most derived graptoloids a dicalycal theca only gives rise to normal (monocalycal) thecae which only produce one new autotheca.

Some graptoloids add branches through the production of cladia, which originate from the thecal apertures of the mother theca rather than from the dorsal side of the stipe. Cladia are secondarily produced by mature zooids away from the growing end of the main stipe, rather than at the tip of the stipe as in dichotomous branching. Cladia are most well-known in monograptids like Cyrtograptus, but are also known from some pterograptids (e.g. Pterograptus) and dicranograptids (e.g. Nemagraptus).

=== Sicula ===
All graptolite colonies originate from a sicula (pl. siculae), which is the housing secreted by the founding zooid of the colony. The siculae of all graptolites are composed of two portions: the prosicula, which is the initial (proximal) portion of the sicula and represents the earliest growth stage of graptolites that can be preserved in the fossil record, and the metasicula, which is the distal portion (the latest-formed portion that is farthest from the point of origin) of the sicula and is constructed out of fusellar increments. The siculae of benthic graptolites are termed discophorous as they are attached to the substrate by a basal disc formed from cortical material (material that is laid down on the tubarium wall after the fuselli are secreted). In constrast, the siculae of the planktonic graptoloids are nematophorous, as they are conical and have a thread-like structure called the nema that extends from the apex of the prosicula.

Siculae of the Graptolithina, showing prosicular dome (dark orange), prosicula with helical line (light orange), metasicula (white), and the first theca (3, 5-6, white). Siculae of the encrusting forms Rhabdopleura spp. (1, 3), Epigraptus bidens (2) and Kozlowskitubus erraticus (4), of the erect benthic Dendrograptus communis (5), and of the planktonic Graptoloidea (6).

The prosicula in the extant genus Rhabdopleura, as well as other encrusting genera like Epigraptus, takes the form of a dome with a flattened dorsal wall that attaches the colony to the substrate. The wall of the dome is featureless and is secreted by glands in the ventral surface of the developing larva. The opening to the metasicula in Rhabdopleura and Epigraptus is a hole formed in the wall of the dome by the developing zooid, creating a sharp angle at the transition between the prosicula and metasicula.

In contrast, the prosicula of the erect benthic Dendroidea and the planktonic Graptoloidea lacks a dome and is tubular (in the Dendroidea) or conical (in the Graptoloidea) throughout. The prosicula in these taxa is secreted out of a single, continuous band of fusellar material, creating a spiraling suture called a helical line that extends along the entire length of the prosicula. The opening for the metasicula in these taxa is a primary opening, meaning that it was originally present rather than being a hole opened in a closed wall, and as a result, there is a smooth transition between the prosicula and metasicula. The prosicula of the cyclograptid Kozlowskitubus is unique, as it has an initial portion like the dome of rhabdopleurids but also has both a primary opening for the metasicula and an erect, tubular distal portion with a helical line like dendroids and graptoloids.

The metasicula is a distally open tube that is composed of fusellar increments and can typically be easily distinguished from the prosicula. The fuselli of the metasicula are usually regular half rings and have dorsal and ventral zigzag sutures. However, the metasicular fuselli in the cyclograptid Kozlowskitubus are irregular throughout and lack zigzag sutures, while the metasicular fuselli in some dendroids and graptoloids are irregular without zigzag sutures only in the proximal (earliest-formed) portion of the metasicula and are regular half rings with zigzag sutures in the distal portion of the metasicula. The ventral apertural margin of the metasicula (and less commonly the dorsal margin) is frequently adorned with a tongue-like rutellum, which can be transformed into a spine called the virgella in some graptoloids.

==== Proximal development ====
The sicula and the first few thecae of a graptolite colony form the proximal end of the colony, and the development of the zooids and thecae (the astogeny) in the proximal end is termed proximal development. The founding zooid of a graptolite colony is the sicular zooid, which is the only zooid in the colony to be produced through sexual reproduction. The zooidal stalk of the sicular zooid forms the prostolon, which is a stalk that attaches to the proximal portion of the sicula and gives rise to the stolon system. The first thecal zooid buds from the prostolon and emerges through a hole in the sicula. In most graptolites, this hole is a resorption foramen pierced in the wall of the sicula; however, the hole is a primary foramen (meaning that it was created during the growth of the sicula rather than being a hole opened in the wall of the sicula) in derived members of the Monograptidae. The colony then grows through budding from the stolon.

The shape of the tubarium is determined through branching, which occurs due to the creation of either a permanent terminal zooid (as in Rhabdopleura) or a dicalycal theca (as in Dendroidea and Graptoloidea). In dendroids and graptoloids, initial branching occurs in highly regular sequences called proximal development patterns, which are often diagnostic for genera or species. In the benthic dendroid "Dictyonema" cavernosum (and presumably most dendroids), the first dicalycal theca is the third-formed autotheca or a later theca. However, the earliest graptoloids evolved isograptid-type development, where the earliest dicalycal theca is the second-formed autotheca (also called theca 1^{2} or th1^{2}). A few early graptoloids (most predominantly species of the genus Didymograptus) possess artus-type development, where the dicalycal theca is the first-formed autotheca (th1^{1}), and the axonophorans evolved several proximal development types all characterized by a delayed dicalycal theca and complex proximal end structure.

=== Wall structure ===
Ultrastructure of the tubarium wall. (1) Three stacked fuselli, showing sheet fabric (sf) and fusellar fabric (ff). (2) Tubarium wall structure, showing fuselli (ff), ectocortex (ect) in the form of cortical bandages, and endocortex (en). Black dots and lines represent fibrils.

The wall of the graptolite tubarium is composed of a fusellar layer (also called fusellum), which is constructed out of stacked growth increments called fuselli (sing. fusellus), and cortical layers (also called cortex) that are laid on top of the fusellum. The wall material was historically called periderm, but this term is inappropriate as it suggests that the tubarium was secreted by an epidermis (the outermost layer of cells in the skin) like the exoskeletons of bryozoans when it was in fact constructed out of secretions from glands in the cephalic shield.

Each fusellus is arch-shaped in cross section and is composed of a central core of fusellar fabric, which is a three-dimensional meshwork of loosely packed and randomly oriented fibrils, that is bound by one layer of sheet fabric below the fusellar fabric and another layer of sheet fabric on top of the fusellar fabric. Both layers of sheet fabric contain fibrils that are parallel to each other and to the top edge of the fusellus. All three layers of the fusellus are secreted in one step.

Cortex is composed of secondary deposits, which are secretions that are laid on top of the thecal wall after the fusellum is constructed. Cortical deposits can be present both on the outer surface of the tubarium, in which case they are called ectocortex, and on the inner surface of the thecae, in which case they are called endocortex. These deposits are often secreted in the form of cortical bandages, which are elongate, parallel-sided structures that are either evenly distributed or, in some taxa, are concentrated to form rods of cortical tissue called lists. Each cortical bandage is composed of a body of cortical fabric, which is composed of tightly-packed fibrils oriented in parallel, that is bound by lower and upper layers of sheet fabric identical to the sheet fabric of the fusellum. While sheet fabric is present in most cortical bandages on the outside of the tubarium, those in the endocortex often lack sheet fabric. Cortical bandages are typically oriented parallel to the thecal axis and often radiate outwards from thecal apertures.

There are three main types of cortex: eucortex, paracortex, and pseudocortex, that are defined by the frequency and orientation of fibrils in the intersheet material between the layers of sheet fabric:

- Eucortex is formed by cortical bandages and is composed of layers of sheet fabric and intersheet material of cortical fabric, which contains straight, parallel fibrils.
- Paracortex is formed by the overlapping "limbs" of succeeding fuselli and is composed of layers of sheet fabric and intersheet material without cortical fabric, instead containing a meshwork of fibrils.
- Pseudocortex is composed of layers of sheet fabric with scarce intersheet material lacking fibrils. The way it is formed is not fully understood, but some instances are likely formed in a similar manner to paracortex.

Some gerontic (aged) specimens of graptolites display cortical overgrowth, which occurs when the cortex is thickened as a result of excessive secretion of cortical bandages late in the development of the tubarium. Cortical overgrowth may seal the thecal apertures of graptolites and may obscure important details, which can make identifying specimens more difficult. Cortical overgrowth may have helped reinforce aged colonies and, in planktonic forms, to modify or maintain the center of gravity.

== Ecology ==
=== Reproduction and development ===
New graptolite colonies are primarily formed by sexual reproduction through both self-fertilization (fertilization occurring between zooids in the same colony) and cross-fertilization (fertilization occurring between different colonies), though in rare cases, graptoloids created new colonies through a mode of asexual reproduction called fragmentation, where broken fragments of existing colonies regenerated into new colonies. Colonies of Rhabdopleura have separate male and female zooids (a condition called gonochorism), with both sexes being present in a single colony. The tubes of female zooids in Rhabdopleura are similar in size to those of the male zooids, but have a coiled encrusting portion. Several groups of encrusting graptolites, as well as the erect benthic dendroids have developed bithecae, which may represent the thecae of miniaturized male zooids. However, the absence of bithecae in graptoloids suggests that they may have evolved hermaphroditic zooids, with the males gradually being eliminated.

The extant genus Rhabdopleura broods eggs in the coiled portion of the female thecae. Ovoid bodies likely representing eggs have also been found in the autothecae of Cysticamara, and crowded embryos have been found in the coiled autothecae of Tubidendrum. The conothecae of some graptolites, like Reticulograptus and Epigraptus, may also have served as chambers for brooding eggs, similar to the ovicells of some bryozoans. Each egg develops into a ciliated, lecithotrophic (yolk-feeding) larva that is similar to the planula larva of cnidarians and the ciliated larvae in harrimaniid enteropneusts. The larva then metamorphoses into the sicular zooid of a new colony. The larva of Rhabdopleura secretes a cocoon before metamorphosis that becomes the prosicular dome, but the presence of the helical line in dendroids and graptoloids suggests that secretion of the prosicula may have begun only after metamorphosis. After metamorphosis, new zooids are added to the colony through budding from the stolon.

Graptolites are capable of repairing damage to their tubaria through secretion of either fusellum (when the growing end of the colony is damaged) or cortex (when older portions of the colony are damaged). Repair of damage is often marked through an unconformity in the fusellar structure. Some graptoloids are also able to regenerate from broken colony fragments (though this is a rare ability, being only known from "Janograptus" and Thamnograptus in the Ordovician and some monograptids in the Silurian), and in this case form new colonies through fragmentation. In "Janograptus" and some monograptids, a broken tubarium can develop a pseudocladium, which creates a bipolar tubarium (with thecae in the regenerated stipe pointing in the opposite direction from the car in the main stipe) like that of graptolites with sicular cladia, but without a sicula. Occasionally, graptolite colonies can develop abnormally, which often manifests by the growth of an extra stipe or, in biserial graptolites, the loss of a stipe.

=== Mode of life and habitat ===
The order Graptolithina encompasses both sessile, benthic (organisms that are rooted on the seabed) and free-living planktonic organisms. Benthic graptolites generally require a stable substrate to attach to, so often grow on hardgrounds and the shells of organisms like brachiopods and trilobites Benthic graptolites tend to inhabit neritic (shallow-water), low-energy (sheltered from currents and ocean waves) environments with low dissolved oxygen concentrations. Benthic graptolites include both encrusting graptolites, which attach to the substrate with the ventral parts of the tubarium, and the erect-growing dendroid graptolites, which attached to the substrate with a holdfast of varying shape.

The Graptoloidea are entirely planktonic (free-floating) organisms that served as important components of Paleozoic pelagic ecosystems. Experimental evidence suggests that graptoloids likely maintained a more or less constant orientation in the water column, with multiramous, cone- or disk-shaped forms orienting themselves horizontally and straight scandent taxa orienting themselves vertically, and would have spiralled as they moved through the water column. Graptoloids were probably able to control their position in the water column to some extent, and may have done so through a combination of buoyancy control and active swimming, possibly by beating wing-like extensions of the cephalic shield. However, graptoloids probably did not control their buoyancy by producing gas bubbles due to biophysical constraints and the absence of extrathecal tissue in graptolite colonies, and the presence of gas-filled floats as in the Ruedemann (1895) model is not supported by the fossil record.

Graptoloid species have been divided into three 'groups' based on the facies that they are found in. Group 1 species are solely found in pelagic (open-water) facies like those of the continental slope and abyssal plain, while Group 3 species are solely found in neritic facies of the inner- and mid-continental shelf and Group 2 species are found in both pelagic and neritic facies. Group 1 species probably resided in oxygen-depleted (dysaerobic) and aphotic deep-water environments (the deep water biotope), while both Group 2 and Group 3 lived in the well-oxygenated, photic environments of the epipelagic zone (the epipelagic biotope).

=== Feeding ===
The diet of Rhabdopleura is mostly known from stomach contents and includes unicellular algae (like diatoms and flagellates), radiolarians, and microscopic crustaceans. Like living pterobranchs and planktonic organisms, extinct graptolites were probably not selective feeders and would eat most particles they could find. However, the thecal apertures of graptolites typically did not exceed 2 mm in diameter, and most graptolites had smaller apertures that may have been restricted by apertural lobes or lappets, which would prevent graptolites from eating larger particles like many radiolarians and chitinozoans. Rather, planktonic graptolites were probably primary consumers that 'grazed' on phytoplankton in a similar manner to the modern krill Euphausia, and may have also formed monospecific swarms like Euphausia.

A zooid of Rhabdopleura feeds by traveling to its thecal aperture and using its arms and their tentacles to capture food. Particles are trapped on the tentacles by a local reversal in the beat of the tentacular cilia, and are then either transported to the mouth or rejected and released from the tentacles. The surface of the tentacles is sticky, which may be important in capturing large prey like crustaceans. Extinct graptolites presumably also fed using paired arms in a similar manner to Rhabdopleura.

For conical, sessile dendroid graptolites, water entered the colony through the mesh-like wall via ambient currents and, after the zooids captured food particles, exited the colony through both the opposite wall and through the opening at the top of the colony. Planktonic graptolites fed as they moved through the water column and adopted a range of feeding styles, with large conical, discoidal, or spiraling colonies filtering a large volume of water and smaller scandent colonies more thoroughly filtering a smaller volume of water. Computational fluid dynamics shows that the motion of planktonic colonies in the water column would funnel water towards the thecal apertures (in at least forms with simple thecae), making the thecal apertures an ideal area to feed from. Planktonic forms may have also taken part in a diel vertical migration, which would allow them to avoid predators in the daytime and exploit resources in both the photic and dysphotic zones.

=== Predators, parasites, and epibionts ===
Evidence of predation on graptolites is rare, despite the fact that they would have been an abundant source of energy for potential predators, which Bates and Kirk (1986) explained by suggesting that the tubarium was too tough for most predators and that the soft tissue was poisonous. The evidence that is present is restricted to damage of the tubarium, and fossils of animals predating on graptolites is not known. Underwood (1993) noted three main types of predation in graptoloids and the evidence for these types in the fossil record, which are listed in the table below. The same paper also noted that filter-feeding was an unlikely method of predation on graptolites, as there were no organisms large enough to feed on graptolites in that manner at the time.

Major types of graptolite predation following Underwood (1993)
| Predation type | "Absorption" | "Crunching" | "Plucking" |
|---|---|---|---|
| Description | Entire colony ingested and digested | Tubarium broken open to eat colony | Individual zooids pulled from colony, typically not fatal for entire colony |
| Predators | Ctenophores, siphonophores, scyphozoans | Arthropods, cephalopods, fish, conodonts | Arthropods, polychaetes, conodonts |
| Evidence | Little or none, buckled tubaria or agglutinated groups | Broken tubaria, graptolite fragments in coprolites | Little or none, damaged thecal apertures |
| Defenses | Large size, spines, motility | Cortical thickening, spines, framework of bars | Apertural spines, smaller thecal apertures, hooked thecae |

Parasites have been reported from both benthic and planktonic graptolites, but are only preserved as outgrowths of the tubarium caused by zooids secreting wall material over the parasite. Irregular, tubular outgrowths called tubothecae are known from cyclograptid and dendroid graptolites, and may grow out of an autothecal aperture (in which case it kills the resident zooid) or from the wall of a stipe. Tubothecae are made of thickened cortex and are formed by the zooids in a graptolite secreting cortical material over a tube-dwelling parasite (possibly a eunicid polychaete). Evidence for parasitism in planktonic graptolites has only been recorded from some biserials and straight monograptids and mostly represents closed 'blisters' in the tubarium wall, but open-ended 'tubes' have been reported from specimens of Geniculograptus and Parapetalolithus. These parasites would have disrupted the hydrodynamics of the colony but were not fatal (though they may have been in more complex forms with a spiraling motion through the water column), and may have fed by intercepting the feeding currents created by their host.

Organic-walled fossils have been reported attached to the stems of the benthic graptolite Mastigograptus and likely represent non-parasitic (commensal) epibionts. Clistrocystis graptolithophilus is a hollow, vesicle-shaped microfossil with a ring-like structure that it uses to attach to Mastigograptus stems on one end and a 'nipple' on the other end. Clistrocystis resembles the chitinous egg cases of the modern cephalopod Sepia officinalis but is much smaller, so may represent the fossilized egg cases of cephalopods. Helicotubulus dextrogyra is a tubular fossil that coils clockwise around the stems of Mastigograptus and may represent the tubes of a fossil phoronid.

== Geological applications ==
=== Preservation ===
Graptolite colonies contain three different 'materials' that can be preserved in the fossil record: the decay-prone tissues of the zooids and the more decay-resistant stolon sheath and tubarium material. The zooids decay within a few days and thus are almost never preserved, while the sclerotized stolon sheath often preserves in benthic graptolites but is not preserved, and was probably absent, in the planktonic graptoloids. The tubaria of graptolites are composed of an organic substance, possibly from collagen and/or a polysaccharide similar to chitin, that is resistant to decay and thus is the most common material to fossilize.

Various modes of preservation in graptolites, showing preservation in relief (1-2) with pyrite infill in (2), as flattened organic films (3-5), and as a silica coating in chert (6).

The tubaria of graptolites are typically preserved as organic compounds and undergo two main 'paths' during diagenesis, which leads to two different preservational styles. The first and most common 'path' occurs when tubaria are compressed during compaction, and results in preservation as flattened carbon films in which important taxonomic features can be impossible to identify. The second 'path' occurs when tubaria are filled with sediment or minerals (most commonly pyrite, but rarely other minerals like phosphates) before compaction, and are thus preserved three-dimensionally (in relief). Specimens with pyrite infill are frequently weathered, creating various iron oxides. In a few specimens, the organic walls are coated in silica and filled with either sediment or more silica. Tectonically deformed graptolites are often coated in pressure shadow minerals like chlorites, and strongly deformed specimens also often show fractures in the organically preserved fusellum.

Metamorphosed graptolite specimens. Top: Expansograptus holmi with silvery, thermally altered fusellum. Bottom: Corymbograptus vicinatus preserved as mold without fusellum.

The color of graptolite fusellum changes progressively during metamorphism (the transformation of rocks due to increasing temperature and pressure) as the organic material is coalified due to increasing temperatures. Graptolites that have not been altered by temperature are typically black or dark brown with a low reflectance and can be correlated with a conodont alteration index (CAI) of 1.0 or 1.5. Graptolites exposed to higher temperatures (anchizone and early epizone grades of metamorphism) become silvery with a higher reflectance and can be correlated with a CAI of 5. As temperatures continue to increase, the fusellum darkens again and then begins to disappear. Highly metamorphosed specimens are preserved as faint imprints or molds which occassionally are outlined by minerals formed during metamorphism.

Chemically isolated specimens of Monograptus priodon.

Both three-dimensionally preserved and flattened graptolites can occasionally be chemically isolated from the surrounding rock using acids like hydrofluoric acid (for specimens in shales), hydrochloric acid (for specimens in limestones and dolostones), or acetic acid (for specimens in limestones). Chemically isolated specimens provide important information on the structure and development of graptolite colonies that cannot be obtained from typical flattened specimens. Bleaching isolated specimens makes them transparent and makes the fusellar structure visible, but a similar result can also be achieved by infrared photography which has thus largely replaced bleaching. Serial sectioning, where a specimen is cut into thin slices using a microtome, is also important for studying the internal structure of isolated material, but has been somewhat replaced by non-destructive methods such as scanning electron microscopy and CT scanning.

=== Biostratigraphy ===
Planktonic graptolites are important index fossils for biostratigraphic correlation of Ordovician–Lower Devonian marine rock sequences, especially deep-water, open ocean black shales but also, to a lesser extent, shallow-water limestones. Graptolite biostratigraphy traditionally used assemblage zones, which are defined by the presence of a faunal assemblage of multiple taxa. However, due to imprecision at the boundaries of assemblage zones, zonal schemes have been refined by the use of interval zones, whose boundaries are defined by the first appearance datum (FAD) or last appearance datum (LAD) of a given species. The lower boundaries of interval zones are typically defined by the FAD of the name-giving species, but the lower boundaries of some interval zones following extinction events are instead bounded by the LAD of the previous zone's name-giving species and named after a long-ranged taxon that proliferates during the extinction event. The base of a stratigraphic stage is defined by a Global Boundary Stratotype Section and Point (GSSP), which in turn is defined by a primary marker, usually the FAD or LAD of a given taxon.

Ordovician graptolite faunas can be divided into a low-latitude 'Pacific province' and a high-latitude 'Atlantic province,' and this high level of provincialism means that a global graptolite zonal scheme for the Ordovician has not been developed. The most representative zonal scheme for the Pacific Province is the Australasian zonal scheme, with 30 biozones with zones averaging 1.5 Myr in length, while that of the Atlantic province is the British zonal scheme, with 16 biozones with zones averaging 2.3 Myr in length. Ordovician GSSPs largely use graptolites as primary markers except for the Tremadocian and Dapingian GSSPs, which use conodonts. Bases of Ordovician stages, with graptolite GSSPs bolded:

- The base of the Ordovician period and Tremadocian stage is defined by the FAD of the conodont Iapetognathus fluctivagus but is also near the FAD of the first graptoloids, which belong to the genus Rhabdinopora.
- The base of the Floian stage is defined by the FAD of **Paratetragraptus approximatus**.
- The base of the Dapingian stage is defined by the FAD of the conodont Baltoniodus triangularis but is also near the FAD of Isograptus victoriae victoriae.
- The base of the Darriwilian stage is defined by the FAD of Levisograptus austrodentatus.
- The base of the Sandbian stage is defined by the FAD of **Nemagraptus gracilis**.
- The base of the Katian stage is defined by the FAD of **Diplacanthograptus caudatus**.
- The base of the Hirnantian stage is defined by the FAD of **Metabolograptus extraordinarius**.

Silurian graptolite faunas are less provincial than Ordovician faunas (though provincialism was present to some extent), and their relative cosmopolitanism allowed global graptolite zonations to be established. The current global zonal scheme contains 34 graptolite biozones with zones averaging 0.71 Myr in length. All Silurian GSSPs were defined with reference to graptolite biozones, but several are in need of revision. Bases of Silurian stages, with graptolite GSSPs bolded:

- The base of the Silurian period and Rhuddanian stage is defined by the FAD of **Akidograptus ascensus**.
- The base of the Aeronian stage is defined by the FAD of **Demirastrites triangulatus**.
- The base of the Telychian stage is defined by the FAD of **Spirograptus guerichi**.
- The base of the Sheinwoodian stage was originally defined by the FAD of **Cyrtograptus centrifugus**, but is currently under revision. The recommended stage boundary is a slightly higher level called the Ireviken datum 2 which is defined with conodonts but is also near the FAD of Cyrtograptus murchisoni.
- The base of the Homerian stage is defined by the FAD of **Cyrtograptus lundgreni**.
- The base of the Gorstian stage is defined by the FAD of **Saetograptus varians**.
- The base of the Ludfordian stage is imprecise but is near the FAD of Saetograptus leintwardensis.
- The base of the Přídolí series is defined by the FAD of **Skalograptus parultimus**.

Lower Devonian graptolite faunas are essentially cosmopolitan. The global Lower Devonian zonal scheme contains 8 graptolite biozones with zones ranging from 0.6 Myr to 3 Myr in length. Bases of Devonian stages, with graptolite GSSPs bolded:

- The base of the Devonian period and Lochkovian stage is defined by the FAD of **Uncinatograptus uniformis**.
- The base of the Pragian stage is defined by the FAD of the conodont Gondwania irregularis but is also near the LAD of Neomonograptus falcarius.
- The base of the Emsian stage was originally defined by the FAD of the conodont Eocostapolygnathus kitabicus but is currently under revision. The recommended stage boundary is a higher level which is defined by the FAD of Eolinguipolygnathus excavatus M114 but is also near the LAD of the planktonic graptolites.

=== Other uses ===
Graptolite biostratigraphy has been used to understand structurally complex rock sequences like those of the Moffat Series in the UK and the Lachlan Orogen in Australia. Tectonic deformation can severely distort the proportions of graptolites, but distorted graptolites can be identified by the growth of pressure shadow minerals like chlorites and also often display parallel fractures in the fusellum. Graptolites with symmetrical tubaria can be used as markers for tectonic deformation, and retrodeformation techniques can be used to determine the amount and direction of deformation.

When graptolite tubaria are deposited on bedding planes by ocean currents, they assume a few stable orientations with respect to the current, which allows them to be used to find the direction of paleocurrents. Scandent graptolites can be oriented with their long axes in the direction of the current (the longitudinal orientation), perpendicular to the current (the transverse orientation), or in intermediate directions, depending on their size and the strength of the current; large colonies and those in strong currents tend to be oriented longitudinally or closer to the longitudinal position, while small colonies and those in weak currents tend to be oriented transversely or closer to the transverse position. More complex tubaria also assume predictable orientations with respect to the current and so can also be used to determine paleocurrent. "Nests", which occur when multiple tubaria form a group oriented parallel to the current, are also useful tools for determining paleocurrents.

== Evolutionary history ==
=== Fossil record ===
Temporal ranges of graptolite taxa following the Treatise on Invertebrate Paleontology:

==== Early evolution ====
The earliest known graptolites are fragments of the rhabdopleurid Sokoloviina costata found as small carbonaceous fossils from the earliest Cambrian (Fortunian) of Ukraine. Three species of graptolite are known from the Cambrian Series 2 (the upper Lower Cambrian): Malongitubus kuangshanensis and Yunotubus gemmatus from the Chinese Cambrian Stage 3 Chengjiang and Xiaoshiba biotas, respectively, and the rhabdopleurid Sphenoecium annularoides (originally Dalyia annularoides), from the Cambrian Stage 4 of Pennsylvania. Graptolite faunas become much more diverse during the Miaolingian epoch (the Middle Cambrian), though still dominated by rhabdopleurids. Sphenoecium, which contains most Cambrian species previously referred to Rhabdopleura, is a common element of Miaolingian graptolite faunas, being spread over multiple continents and containing multiple species. The earliest erect graptolites, the dithecodendrids, originated at the base of the Miaolingian. The dithecodendrids are important for understanding the evolution of later erect forms, but they are generally poorly preserved and their phylogenetic position is uncertain.

Various Middle Cambrian species of graptolites. (a-c): Archaeolafoea skeatsi. (c) is a detail of the fusellum. (d): Sphenoecium wheelerensis. (e): Tarnagraptus robustus.

The earliest dendroids can be found in the upper Miaolingian, represented by Acanthograptus, Callograptus, Dendrograptus, Desmograptus, and Dictyonema; however, dendroids only begin to dominate in the succeeding Furongian (the Late Cambrian) epoch. The Furongian has a poorly studied fossil record, causing the interval to be termed the Furongian Gap. This gap was recently filled with the discovery of the Guole biota from the middle Furongian of China, which contains a diverse graptolite fauna dominated by the Dendrograptidae, Callograptidae, and Dithecodendridae. The Guole biota also preserves the earliest fossils of true Rhabdopleura, two poorly preserved specimens resembling Rhabdopleura compacta growing on tubes of the cnidarian Sphenothallus.

The Dendroidea resided primarily in stable, inshore environments and changed relatively little over their evolutionary history, with most genera from the Cambrian persisting through the succeeding Ordovician and Silurian periods. The Dendroidea can be differentiated into two families: the Dendrograptidae, characterized by widening thecae with a ventral apertural lip, and the Callograptidae, characterized by tube-like, overlapping thecae with isolated apertures. In both families, dendroid evolution follows a trend from bushy, irregular colonies like Dendrograptus and Acanthograptus, through more ordered fan-shaped forms with parallel stipes assigned to Callograptus, to fan-shaped or conical forms with dissepiments, thecal bridges, or anastomosis assigned to Dictyonema and Desmograptus. While most dendroids were benthic, sessile organisms, several Ordovician dendrograptids of the genus Calyxdendrum evolved a planktonic lifestyle independently from Rhabdinopora and the graptoloids.

Three families of encrusting graptolites, the Cyclograptidae, Cysticamaridae, and Wimanicrustidae, are known mostly from isolated material in Ordovician glacial erratics. All three families' earliest occurences are from the Tremadocian (earliest Ordovician). Cysticamaridae is only known until the Sandbian (early Late Ordovician), but Cyclograptidae and Wimanicrustidae range to the Silurian.

==== Planktonic forms ====
Various Ordovician (top row) and Silurian (bottom row) graptoloids. Top, from left to right: the dichograptid Dichograptus octobrachiatus and the primitive axonophoran Levisograptus primus. Bottom, from left to right: the retiolitid Paraplectograptus hermanni and the monograptid Rastrites guizhouensis.

The late Cambrian and early Ordovician saw a radiation in phytoplankton, which coincided with the diversification of the planktonic Graptoloidea in the Early and Middle Ordovician. The earliest graptoloids were members of the conical, multiramous genus Rhabdinopora, which evolved from benthic dendrograptids in the late Cambrian. The Ordovician graptolite radiation occurred in three successive faunas: the anisograptid fauna, comprising multiramous, bithecate members of the Anisograptidae, that dominated the Tremadocian; the dichograptid fauna, comprising multiramous or pauciramous members of the Dichograptina, Sinograptina, and Glossograptina, that originated in the middle Tremadocian and dominated the Middle Ordovician before declining and going extinct by the Katian; and the diplograptid fauna, comprising the scandent axonophorans (particularly the Diplograptina) that evolved in the Darriwilian and radiated to become the dominant group of graptoloids by the Katian. The end-Ordovician glaciation caused a period of faunal turnover (the Late Ordovician mass extinction) that stretched from the very end of the Katian to the end of the latest Ordovician Hirnantian stage. During this period, the Diplograptina, which had dominated tropical faunas and lived in dysoxic (low-oxygen), mesopelagic waters, slowly went extinct and were replaced by members of the Neograptina that had invaded from polar oceans and inhabited the oxygenated epipelagic zone.

The Neograptina were unharmed by the Hirnantian glaciation and diversified even during the LOME. The succeeding Llandovery epoch saw an explosion in morphological disparity fueled by the evolution of the uniserial Monograptidae in the early Rhuddanian and the evolution of the mesh-like Retiolitinae at the start of the succeeding Aeronian stage. Late Llandovery and early Wenlock faunas were composed of a diverse variety of monograptids and retiolitines but were decimated by the mid-Wenlock lundgreni event (or the Great Crisis), which exterminated nearly all monograptids (with only unspecialized members of the Pristiograptus dubius group surviving the event) but left the retiolitines relatively unharmed. However, the retiolitines went extinct in the succeeding leintwardensis event during the middle Ludlow, along with several lineages of monograptids. The surviving graptoloids were hit by additional extinctions at the end of the Ludlow (the kozlowskii event) and at the Silurian-Devonian boundary (the transgrediens event).

The transgrediens event in particular wiped out the long-lived Pristiograptus dubius lineage and nearly all other Silurian genera, with only the multi-branched Linograptus making it into the Devonian. Devonian faunas are characterized by the reappearance of the Lazarus taxon Uncinatograptus, possibly originating from the early Přídolí Uncinatograptus pridoliensis. Linograptus and its descendant Abiesgraptus went extinct before the end of the Lochkovian, leaving only Uncinatograptus and some related genera in the Pragian. The last graptoloids went extinct in the early Emsian atopus event, with the latest-surviving graptoloid probably being Uncinatograptus yukonensis.

==== Later benthic graptolites ====
Dendroid graptolites survived past the Early Devonian, but are poorly known from post-Early Devonian strata. Devonian faunas are dominated by members of the Callograptidae, such as species of Callograptus, Dictyonema, Desmograptus, and Palaeodictyota. Dendrograptids are rare from the Devonian, with only the genera Ophigraptus, Aspidograptus, and possibly Dendrograptus being known from Devonian strata, and only Callograptidae have been found from the Carboniferous. The Dendroidea went extinct by the Serpukhovian, but the reasons for their extinction are unknown.

The last known graptolite remains not assigned to the genus Rhabdopleura are Middle Permian stolons of the rhabdopleurid genus Diplohydra. Rhabdopleura itself is known from the Cambrian (Rhabdopleura sp. from the Guole Biota), but the earliest named species that can be confidently assigned to the genus is Rhabdopleura hollandi from the Silurian. Fossil species of Rhabdopleura are also known from the Carboniferous (Rhabdopleura graysoni and Rhabdopleura delmeri), the Jurassic (Rhabdopleura kozlowskii), the Cretaceous (Rhabdopleura vistulae), and the Eocene (Rhabdopleura eocenica). Rhabdopleura is also known from 12 extant species from all major oceans and at a wide range of latitudes and water depths.

=== External relationships ===
Graptolites are members of the class Pterobranchia, and can be united with other pterobranchs through the presence of asexually budding zooids and a tubarium constructed out of fusellar increments. Pterobranchia is a monophyletic group within the phylum Hemichordata, which also includes the free-living, worm-shaped enteropneusts (also called acorn worms). Hemichordates are deuterostomes and are most closely related to the Echinodermata, with the two phyla forming the clade Ambulacraria.

The following cladogram shows the relationships between graptolites and other ambulacrarians:

- Ambulacraria
  - Echinodermata
  - Hemichordata
    - Enteropneusta
      - Harrimaniidae
      - - Spengelidae
        - - Ptychoderidae
          - Torquaratoridae
    - Pterobranchia
      - Cephalodiscus
      - Graptolithina
        - benthic forms (paraphyletic)
          Rhabdopleura
        - †Graptoloidea

=== Interrelationships ===
Graptolites are a monophyletic group that includes all taxa more closely related to Rhabdopleura than Cephalodiscus. A clade composed of Rhabdopleura and the 'traditional' graptolites but excluding Cephalodiscus is well-supported, as Mitchell et al. (2013)'s cladistic analysis of the Graptolithina found resampling support for a clade composed of Rhabdopleura and other graptolites to be between 67% and 100% depending on the character coding schemes used.

Mitchell et al. (2013) found multiple synapomorphies that can be used to define the Graptolithina:

- Truly colonial organization with zooids budding from a stolon system
- The presence of regular fusellar sutures on the creeping tubes
- The presence of fusellar full rings or regularly arranged half rings on the erect tubes
- The presence of a sclerotized prosicula (though this is unknown in Cysticamara).

Mitchell et al. (2013) also named the clade Eugraptolithina, based on the presence of a helical line on the prosicula, that includes the family Cyclograptidae and the orders Dendroidea and Graptoloidea. While the Eugraptolithina may represent a natural clade, the sicula is poorly known from most benthic graptolites, which limits the usefulness of the clade.

Phylogeny of the Graptolithina based on Mitchell et al. (2013)'s main analysis.

- Pterobranchia
  - Cephalodiscus (Cephalodiscus) + C. (Acoelothecia)
  - Cephalodiscus (Orthoecus) + C. (Idiotheca)
  - Graptolithina
    - Cysticamara
    - - Rhabdopleura
      - Epigraptus
      - - Wimanicrustidae
          Bulmanicrusta
        - Bithecocamara
      - Kozlowskitubus
      - Dendrotubus
      - Reticulograptus
      - Dendroidea
        - Mastigograptus
        - Acanthograptus
        - Koremagraptus
        - - Mastigograptus
          - Acanthograptus
          - Koremagraptus
          - Dendrograptidae
            - Dendrograptus
            - - "Dictyonema"
              - - Graptoloidea
                  Rhabdinopora
                - Anisograptus

Phylogeny of the Graptolithina based on Mitchell et al. (2013)'s analysis of an updated version of the Durman (1992) matrix.

- Pterobranchia
  - Cephalodiscus
  - Rhabdopleura
  - - - Cysticamara
      - - Bithecocamara
        - Wimanicrustidae
          - Ellesicrusta
          - Wimanicrusta
    - - Cyclograptidae
        - Tubidendrum
        - - Reticulograptus
          - - Epigraptus
            - Dendrotubus
            - Cyclograptus
      - - - Dithecodendridae
            Sotograptus
          - Archaeolafoea
          - Mastigograptidae
            Mastigograptus
        - Dendroidea
          - Callograptidae
            - Acanthograptus
            - Koremagraptus
          - Dendrograptidae
            - Dendrograptus
            - - "Dictyonema"
              - Graptoloidea
                - Rhabdinopora
                - - Anisograptus
                  - Calyxdendrum

==== Taxonomy ====
Representatives of the main groups of graptolites

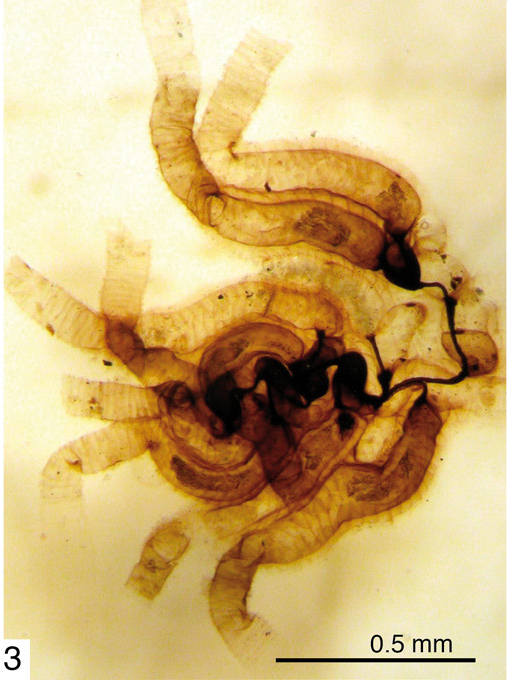
Rhabdopleuridae

Cysticamaridae

Wimanicrustidae

Cyclograptidae

Dithecodendridae

Dendroidea

Graptoloidea

The Graptolithina include the two main orders Dendroidea and Graptoloidea, as well as several small families of uncertain phylogenetic placement.

Taxonomy of the Graptolithina following the Treatise on Invertebrate Paleontology, Part V, Second Revision:

Subclass Graptolithina Bronn, 1849

- Graptolithina incertae sedis
  - Family Rhabdopleuridae Harmer, 1905
  - Family †Cysticamaridae Bulman, 1955
  - Family †Wimanicrustidae Bulman, 1970
  - Family †Cyclograptidae Bulman, 1938
  - Family †Dithecodendridae Obut, 1964
- Order †Dendroidea Nicholson, 1872
  - Family †Mastigograptidae Bates & Urbanek, 2002
  - Family †Callograptidae Bulman, 1938
  - Family †Dendrograptidae Roemer, 1897 in Frech, 1897
- Order †Graptoloidea Lapworth, 1875 in Hopkinson & Lapworth, 1875
  - Suborder †Graptodendroidina Mu & Lin, 1981 in Lin, 1981 (1 family)
  - Suborder †Sinograptina Maletz et al., 2009 (4 families)
  - Suborder †Dichograptina Lapworth, 1873 (4 families)
  - Suborder †Glossograptina Jaanusson, 1960 (2 families)
  - Suborder †Axonophora Frech, 1897
    - Infraorder †Diplograptina Lapworth, 1880 (3 families)
    - Infraorder †Neograptina Štorch et al., 2011 (5 families)
