= Listed buildings in Harley, Shropshire =

Harley is a civil parish in Shropshire, England. It contains 15 listed buildings that are recorded in the National Heritage List for England. All the listed buildings are designated at Grade II, the lowest of the three grades, which is applied to "buildings of national importance and special interest". The parish contains the village of Harley and the surrounding countryside. Most of the listed buildings are houses, farmhouses and farm buildings, many of which are timber framed, or have timber framed cores. The other listed buildings are a church, memorials in the churchyard, an animal pound, and a milepost.

== Buildings ==
Name and location	Photograph	Date	Notes
St Mary's Church; 52.60951°N 2.59770°W		13th century	The oldest parts of the church are the lower two stages of the tower, the top stage was added in the 15th century, and the body of the church was rebuilt in 1845–46 by S. Pountney Smith. It is built in sandstone with a tile roof, and consists of a nave, a south porch, a chancel, and a west tower. The tower has three stages, a west doorway, a clock face on the west side, and an embattled parapet with corner gargoyles. The windows in the nave are in Perpendicular style, and in the chancel they are lancets.
The Old Rectory; 52.60946°N 2.59872°W		14th or 15th century	The rectory, later a private house, was remodelled in the 16th century, and extended in about 1820. The original part is timber framed with plaster infill with a tile roof. It has two storeys and an attic, a hall range of two bays, and a two-bay range at right angles to the south. At the rear is a parallel two-storey range added in the late 18th century. To the right is a range added in about 1820; this is in brick red brick with a hipped slate roof, two storeys and two bays. The windows are a mix of casements and sashes.
3 Harley; 52.60920°N 2.59776°W		Late 16th century	A timber framed cottage with infill in brick and plaster, on a sandstone plinth, and with a thatched roof. There is one storey and an attic, and four bays. On the front is a gabled porch with a round-headed arch, the windows are casements, and there is a gabled dormer.
10 Mill Bank; 52.60828°N 2.59631°W	—	Early 17th century	A timber framed house with brick infill on a stone plinth with a thatched roof. There is one storey and an attic and a basement storey, two bays, and a right lean-to. The windows are casements, and the door is in the right return.
Brant; 52.60703°N 2.59391°W		17th century	The cottage was later extended. The original part is timber framed with brick infill on a gritstone plinth, the extension to the left is in gritstone, and the roof is thatched. There is one storey and an attic, and steps lead up to the doorway. The windows are casements, and there are two raking dormers, one with four lights, the other with two.
Forge Farmhouse; 52.60876°N 2.59897°W	—	17th century (probable)	The farmhouse, which was altered and extended in the 19th century, probably has a timber framed core that is encased and extended in brick, and it has a tile roof. There are two storeys, a main range of two bays flanked by projecting gabled wings, and a single-storey kitchen wing in gritstone at the rear. In the angle between the main range and the right wing is a gabled porch, and the windows are casements.
The Crow's Nest; 52.61173°N 2.61149°W	—	17th century (probable)	A timber framed house encased in gritstone in the late 18th century, extended in gritstone in the 20th century, and with a tile roof. There is one storey and an attic and three bays. The windows are casements, and there are three gabled eaves dormers.
Barn, Blakeway Farm; 52.58919°N 2.60096°W	—	Late 17th century (probable)	The barn is timber framed with weatherboarding on a limestone plinth, it has brown brick infill in the southeast gable end, and a tile roof. There are three bays, and a central former threshing entrance.
Blakeway Farmhouse; 52.58891°N 2.60101°W	—	Mid 18th century	The farmhouse is in red brick on a chamfered plinth with a tile roof. There are two storeys and an attic, and five bays. The windows are casements which have segmental heads, as does the doorway, and there are three gabled eaves dormers.
Village pound 52.61030°N 2.59837°W	—	Late 18th or early 19th century (probable)	The former animal pound is built in sandstone and gritstone. It has a rectangular plan measuring about 3 metres (9.8 ft) by 2.5 metres (8 ft 2 in) and with walls about 1.5 metres (4 ft 11 in) high.
Corfield memorial 52.60949°N 2.59800°W	—	c. 1810	The memorial is in the churchyard of St Mary's Church. It is a chest tomb in limestone, and has a rectangular plan. The tomb has a moulded plinth, a chamfered top, fluted corner pilasters, and a recessed semicircular inscription panel on the south side that is largely illegible.
Rowley Farmhouse; 52.59478°N 2.60257°W	—	Early 19th century	The farmhouse is in red brick on a sandstone plinth with a hipped slate roof. There are two storeys, three bays, and a lower service block to the right. The central doorway has a pediment, and the windows are sashes.
Adney memorial 52.60958°N 2.59742°W	—	c. 1829	The memorial is in the churchyard of St Mary's Church, and is to the memory of members of the Adney family. It is a chest tomb in limestone, and has a rectangular plan. The tomb has a moulded plinth, a chamfered top, reeded corner pilasters, a recessed semi-circular inscription panel on the south side, and blank raised oval panels on the east and west sides.
Adney memorial and enclosure 52.60962°N 2.59746°W	—	c. 1840	The memorial is in the churchyard of St Mary's Church, and is to the memory of members of the Adney family. It is a chest tomb in limestone, it has a rectangular plan, and is surrounded by cast iron railings. The tomb has a moulded plinth and capping, square corner pilasters, and inscriptions on the sides.
Milepost; 52.60253°N 2.58899°W	—	Mid to late 19th century	The milepost is on the southwest side of the A458 road. It is in cast iron, triangular, and inscribed with the distances in miles to Much Wenlock, "Salop" (Shrewsbury), and Bridgnorth.
