= Wenlock Epoch =

2nd Series (Epoch) of the Silurian

Wenlock
- 432.9 ± 1.2 – 426.7 ± 1.5 Ma
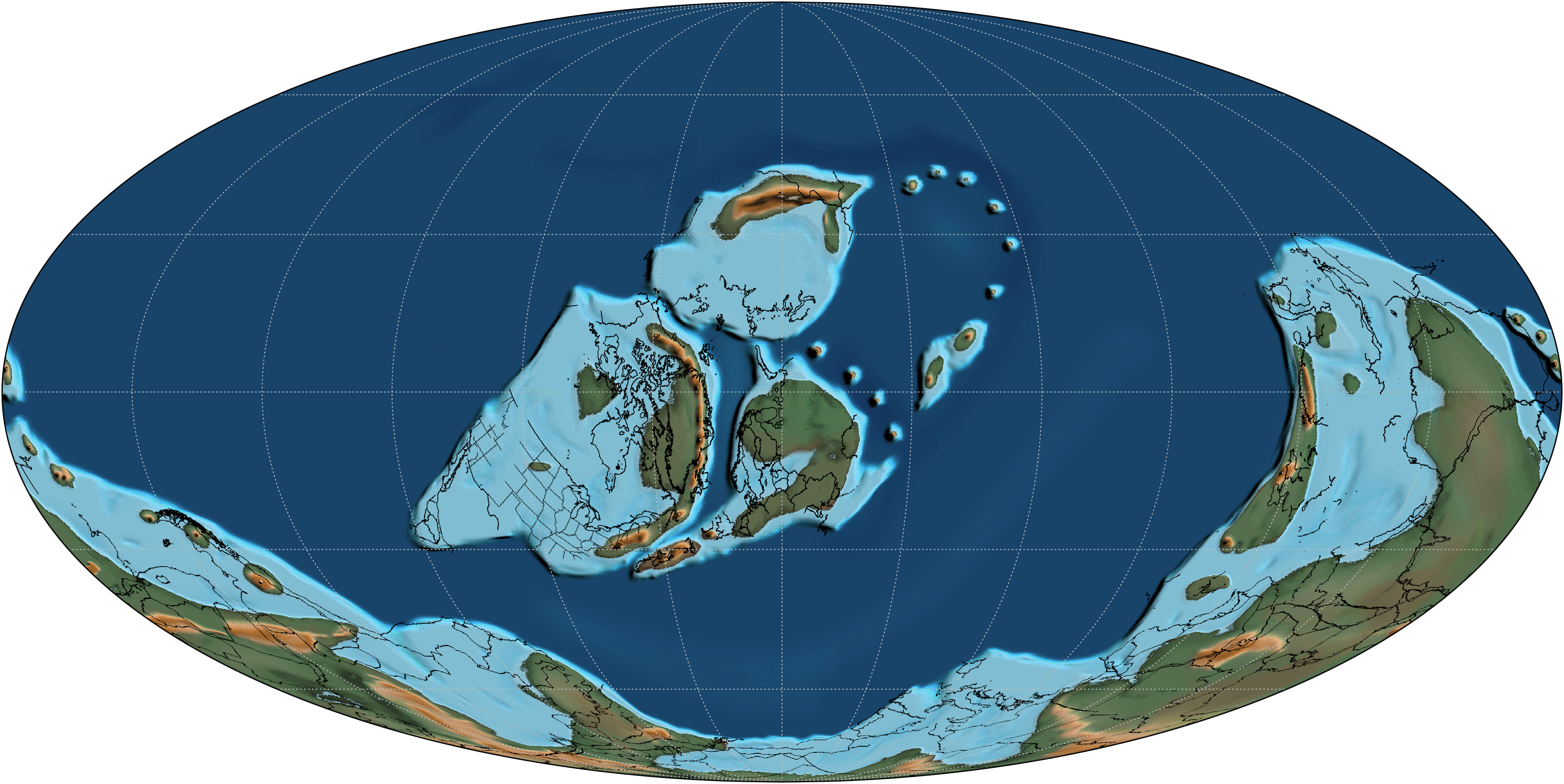
- A map of Earth as it appeared 430 million years ago during the Wenlock Epoch, Homerian Age

Chronology
| ← / Lau event; ← / Mulde event; ← / Ireviken event |
Subdivision of the Silurian according to the ICS, as of 2024. Vertical axis scale: Millions of years ago

Etymology
- Name formality: Formal
- Name ratified: 1980

Usage information
- Celestial body: Earth
- Regional usage: Global (ICS)
- Time scale(s) used: ICS Time Scale

Definition
- Chronological unit: Epoch
- Stratigraphic unit: Series
- Time span formality: Formal
- Lower boundary definition: Imprecise. Currently placed between acritarch biozone 5 and last appearance of Pterospathodus amorphognathoides. See Llandovery for more info.
- Lower boundary definition candidates: A conodont boundary (Ireviken datum 2) which is close to the murchisoni graptolite biozone.
- Lower boundary GSSP candidate section(s): None
- Lower boundary GSSP: Hughley Brook, Apedale, U.K. 52.5811°N 2.6389°W
- Lower GSSP ratified: 1980
- Upper boundary definition: FAD of the Graptolite Saetograptus (Colonograptus) varians
- Upper boundary GSSP: Pitch Coppice, Ludlow, U.K. 52.3592°N 2.7772°W
- Upper GSSP ratified: 1980

The Wenlock Epoch (sometimes referred to as the Wenlockian) or Mid-Early Silurian is the second epoch of the Silurian. It is preceded by the Llandovery Epoch and followed by the Ludlow Epoch. Radiometric dates constrain the Wenlockian between 432.9 and 426.7 million years ago.

== Naming and history ==
The Wenlock is named after Wenlock Edge, an outcrop of rocks near the town of Much Wenlock in Shropshire (West Midlands, United Kingdom). The name was first used in the term "Wenlock and Dudley rocks" by Roderick Murchison in 1834 to refer to the limestones and underlying shales that underlay what he termed the "Ludlow rocks". He later modified this term to simply the "Wenlock rocks" in his book, The Silurian System in 1839.

== Definition and subdivision ==
The Wenlock's beginning is defined by the lower boundary (or GSSP) of the Sheinwoodian. The end is defined as the base (or GSSP) of the Gorstian.

The Wenlock is divided into the older Sheinwoodian and the younger Homerian stage. The Sheinwoodian lasted from 432.9 to 430.6 million years ago. The Homerian lasted from 430.6 to 426.7 million years ago.
