= Cephalodiscidae mitochondrial code =

Alternative genetic code in some pterobranchians

The Cephalodiscidae mitochondrial code (translation table 33) is a genetic code used by the mitochondrial genome of Cephalodiscidae (Pterobranchia). The Pterobranchia are one of the two groups in the Hemichordata which together with the Echinodermata and Chordata form the major clades of deuterostomes.

Code 33 is very similar to the mitochondrial code 24 for the Pterobranchia, which also belong to the Hemichordata, except that it uses UAA for tyrosine rather than as a stop codon.

This code shares with many other mitochondrial codes the reassignment of the UGA STOP to tryptophan, and AGG and AGA to an amino acid other than arginine. However, the assignment of AGG to lysine in pterobranchian mitogenomes is not found elsewhere in deuterostome mitochondria but it occurs in some taxa of Arthropoda.

== The code ==
AAs = FFLLSSSSYYY*CCWWLLLLPPPPHHQQRRRRIIIMTTTTNNKKSSSKVVVVAAAADDEEGGGG
Starts = ---M-------*-------M---------------M---------------M------------
Base1 = TTTTTTTTTTTTTTTTCCCCCCCCCCCCCCCCAAAAAAAAAAAAAAAAGGGGGGGGGGGGGGGG
Base2 = TTTTCCCCAAAAGGGGTTTTCCCCAAAAGGGGTTTTCCCCAAAAGGGGTTTTCCCCAAAAGGGG
Base3 = TCAGTCAGTCAGTCAGTCAGTCAGTCAGTCAGTCAGTCAGTCAGTCAGTCAGTCAGTCAGTCAG

Bases: adenine (A), cytosine (C), guanine (G) and thymine (T) or uracil (U).

Amino acids: Alanine (Ala, A), Arginine (Arg, R), Asparagine (Asn, N), Aspartic acid (Asp, D), Cysteine (Cys, C), Glutamic acid (Glu, E), Glutamine (Gln, Q), Glycine (Gly, G), Histidine (His, H), Isoleucine (Ile, I), Leucine (Leu, L), Lysine (Lys, K), Methionine (Met, M), Phenylalanine (Phe, F), Proline (Pro, P), Serine (Ser, S), Threonine (Thr, T), Tryptophan (Trp, W), Tyrosine (Tyr, Y), Valine (Val, V).

== Differences from the standard code ==
DNA codons	RNA codons	This code (33)	Standard code (1)
TAA	UAA	Tyr (Y)	STOP = Ter (*)
TGA	UGA	Trp (W)	STOP = Ter (*)
AGA	AGA	Ser (S)	Arg (R)
AGG	AGG	Lys (K)	Arg (R)

== See also ==
- List of genetic codes
