= Dendrograptus =

Scientific classification
- Kingdom: Animalia
- Phylum: Hemichordata
- Class: Pterobranchia
- Subclass: Graptolithina
- Order: †Dendroidea
- Family: †Dendrograptidae
- Genus: †Dendrograptus; Hall, 1858

Genus of marine worm-like animals

Dendrograptus is an extinct genus of graptolites from the Lower Ordovician.
