= Pterobranchia mitochondrial code =

Alternative genetic code

The pterobranchia mitochondrial code (translation table 24) is a genetic code used by the mitochondrial genome of Rhabdopleura compacta (Pterobranchia). The Pterobranchia are one of the two groups in the Hemichordata which together with the Echinodermata and Chordata form the three major lineages of deuterostomes. AUA translates to isoleucine in Rhabdopleura as it does in the Echinodermata and Enteropneusta while AUA encodes methionine in the Chordata. The assignment of AGG to lysine is not found elsewhere in deuterostome mitochondria but it occurs in some taxa of Arthropoda. This code shares with many other mitochondrial codes the reassignment of the UGA STOP to tryptophan, and AGG and AGA to an amino acid other than arginine. The initiation codons in Rhabdopleura compacta are ATG and GTG.

Code 24 is very similar to the mitochondrial code 33 for the Pterobranchia.

== The code ==
AAs = FFLLSSSSYY**CCWWLLLLPPPPHHQQRRRRIIIMTTTTNNKKSSSKVVVVAAAADDEEGGGG
Starts = ---M---------------M---------------M---------------M------------
Base1 = TTTTTTTTTTTTTTTTCCCCCCCCCCCCCCCCAAAAAAAAAAAAAAAAGGGGGGGGGGGGGGGG
Base2 = TTTTCCCCAAAAGGGGTTTTCCCCAAAAGGGGTTTTCCCCAAAAGGGGTTTTCCCCAAAAGGGG
Base3 = TCAGTCAGTCAGTCAGTCAGTCAGTCAGTCAGTCAGTCAGTCAGTCAGTCAGTCAGTCAGTCAG

Bases: adenine (A), cytosine (C), guanine (G) and thymine (T) or uracil (U).

Amino acids: Alanine (Ala, A), Arginine (Arg, R), Asparagine (Asn, N), Aspartic acid (Asp, D), Cysteine (Cys, C), Glutamic acid (Glu, E), Glutamine (Gln, Q), Glycine (Gly, G), Histidine (His, H), Isoleucine (Ile, I), Leucine (Leu, L), Lysine (Lys, K), Methionine (Met, M), Phenylalanine (Phe, F), Proline (Pro, P), Serine (Ser, S), Threonine (Thr, T), Tryptophan (Trp, W), Tyrosine (Tyr, Y), Valine (Val, V)

== Differences from the standard code ==
DNA codons	RNA codons	This code (24)	Standard code (1)
AGA	AGA	Ser (S)	Arg (R)
AGG	AGG	Lys (K)	Arg (R)
TGA	UGA	Trp (W)	STOP = Ter (*)

== See also ==
- List of genetic codes
