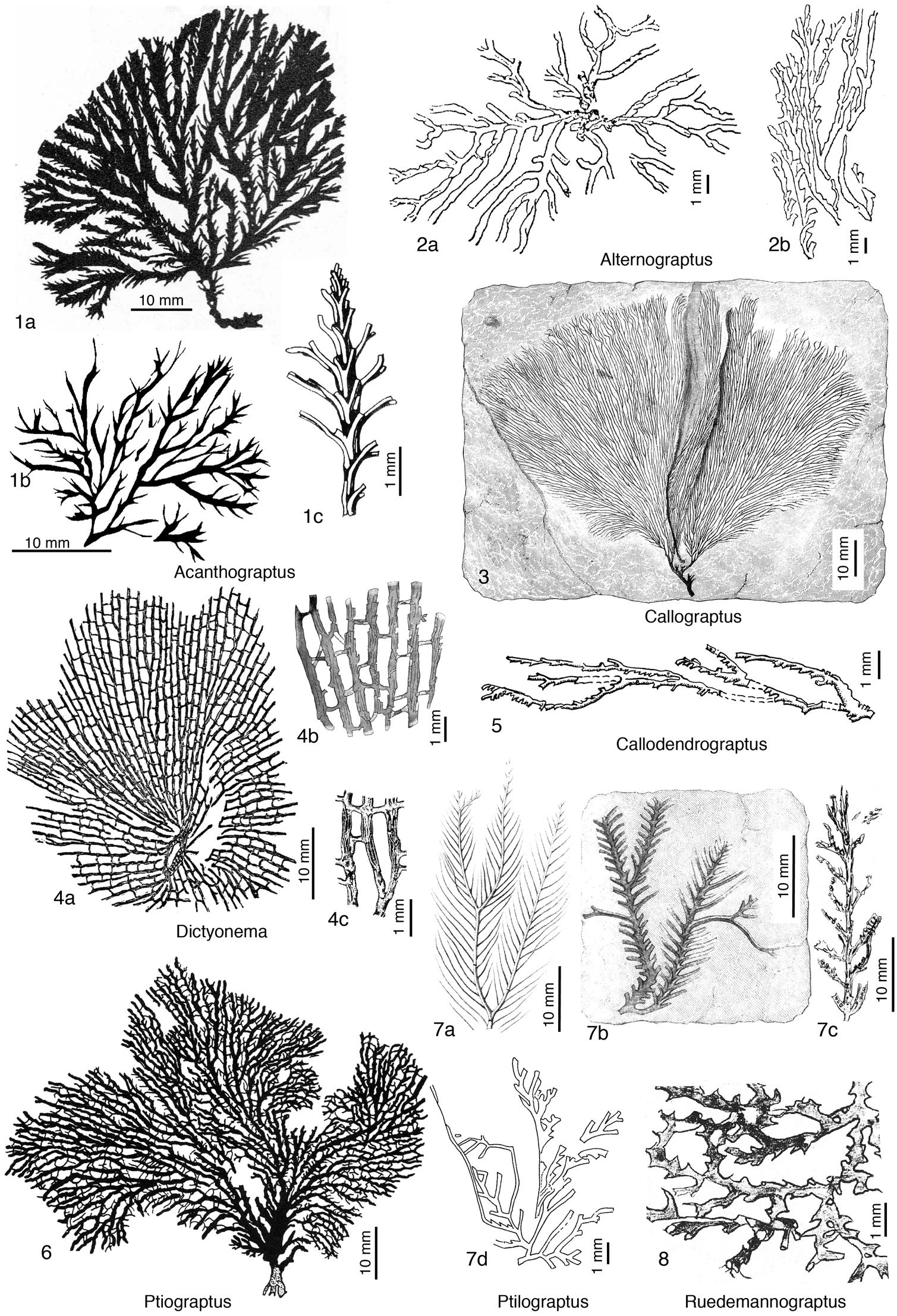

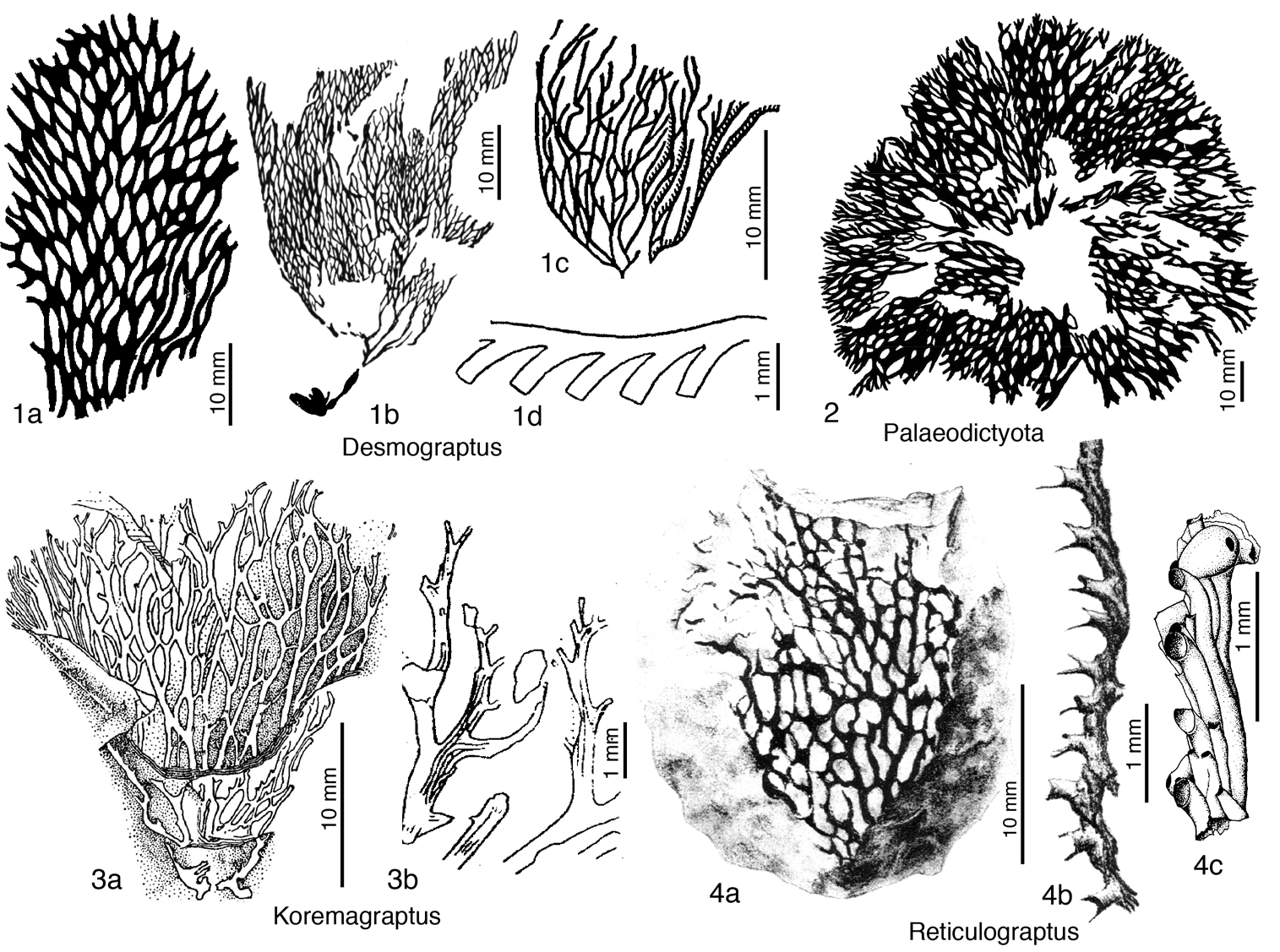
- Various members of Callograptidae

Scientific classification
- Kingdom: Animalia
- Phylum: Hemichordata
- Class: Pterobranchia
- Subclass: Graptolithina
- Order: †Dendroidea
- Family: †Callograptidae; Hopkinson in Hopkinson & Lapworth, 1875

Genera
- See Genera

Synonyms
- Acanthograptidae Bulman, 1938; Pseudodictyonemidae Chapman, Rickards, & Grayson, 1993; Stelechocladiidae Chapman, Rickards, & Grayson, 1993; ?Ptilograptidae Hopkinson in Hopkinson & Lapworth, 1875; ?Nephelograptidae Bouček, 1957

= Callograptidae =

Callograptidae Temporal range: Cambrian (Miaolingian)–Carboniferous, Mississippian (Arnsbergian)

Extinct family of graptolites

Callograptidae is an extinct family of graptolites.

== Genera ==
Based on Maletz (2020), the following genera are recognised in the family Callograptidae.

- †Acanthograptus Spencer, 1878
- †Alternograptus Bouček, 1956
- †Callograptus Hall, 1865
- †Callodendrograptus Decker, 1945
- †Desmograptus Hopkinson in Hopkinson & LapwortH, 1875
- †Dictyonema Hall, 1851
- †Koremagraptus Bulman, 1927b
- †Palaeodictyota Whitfield, 1902
- †Ptilograptus Hall, 1865
- †Ptiograptus Ruedemann, 1908
- †Reticulograptus Wiman, 1901
- †Ruedemannograptus Termier & Termier, 1948

Possible callogratpids, previously identified as plants:

- †Boiophyton Obrhel, 1959
- †Bowerophylloides Edwards, Morel, Poiré, & Cingolani, 2001
- †Saxonia Roselt, 1962

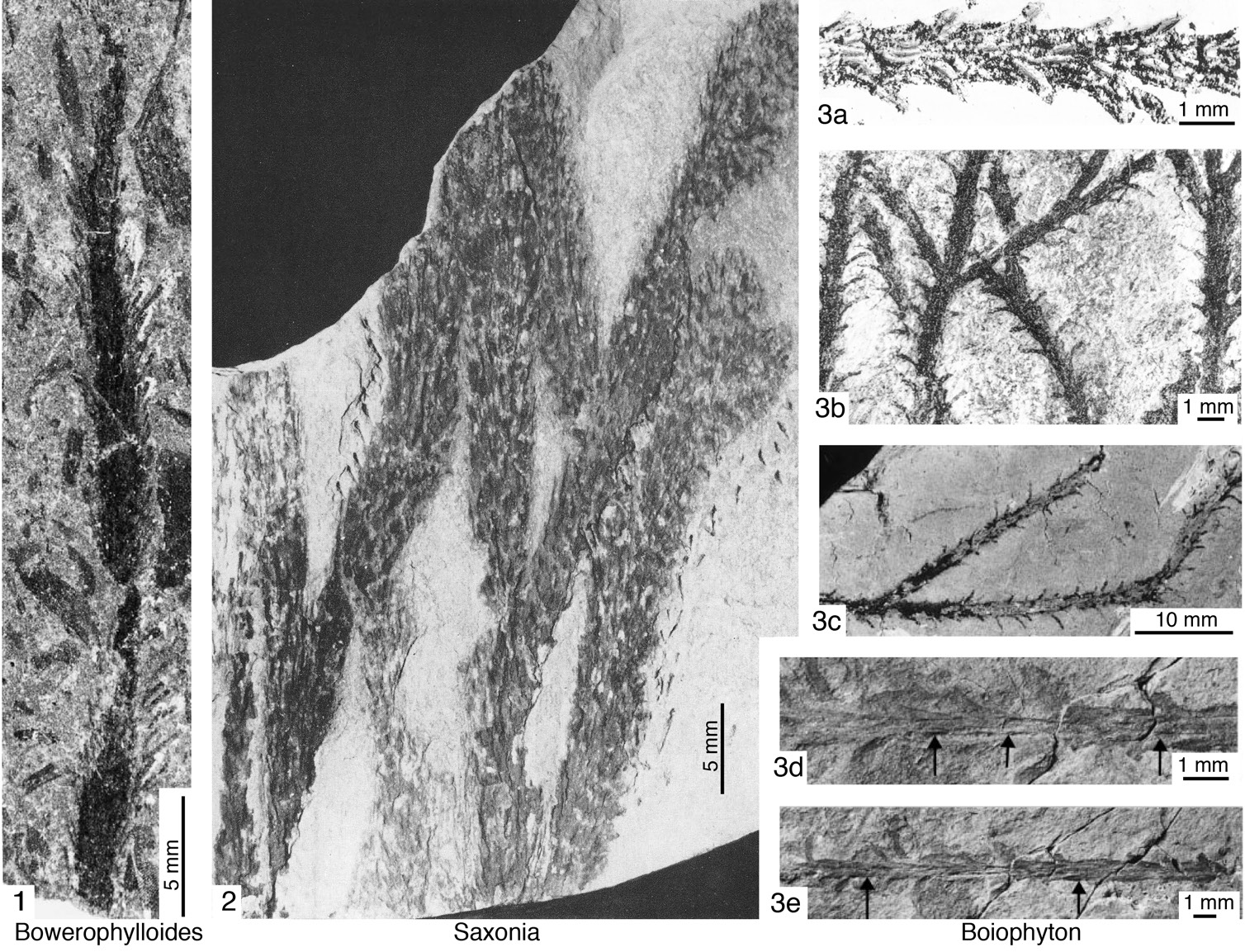
Possible members of Callograptidae, previously identified as plants
