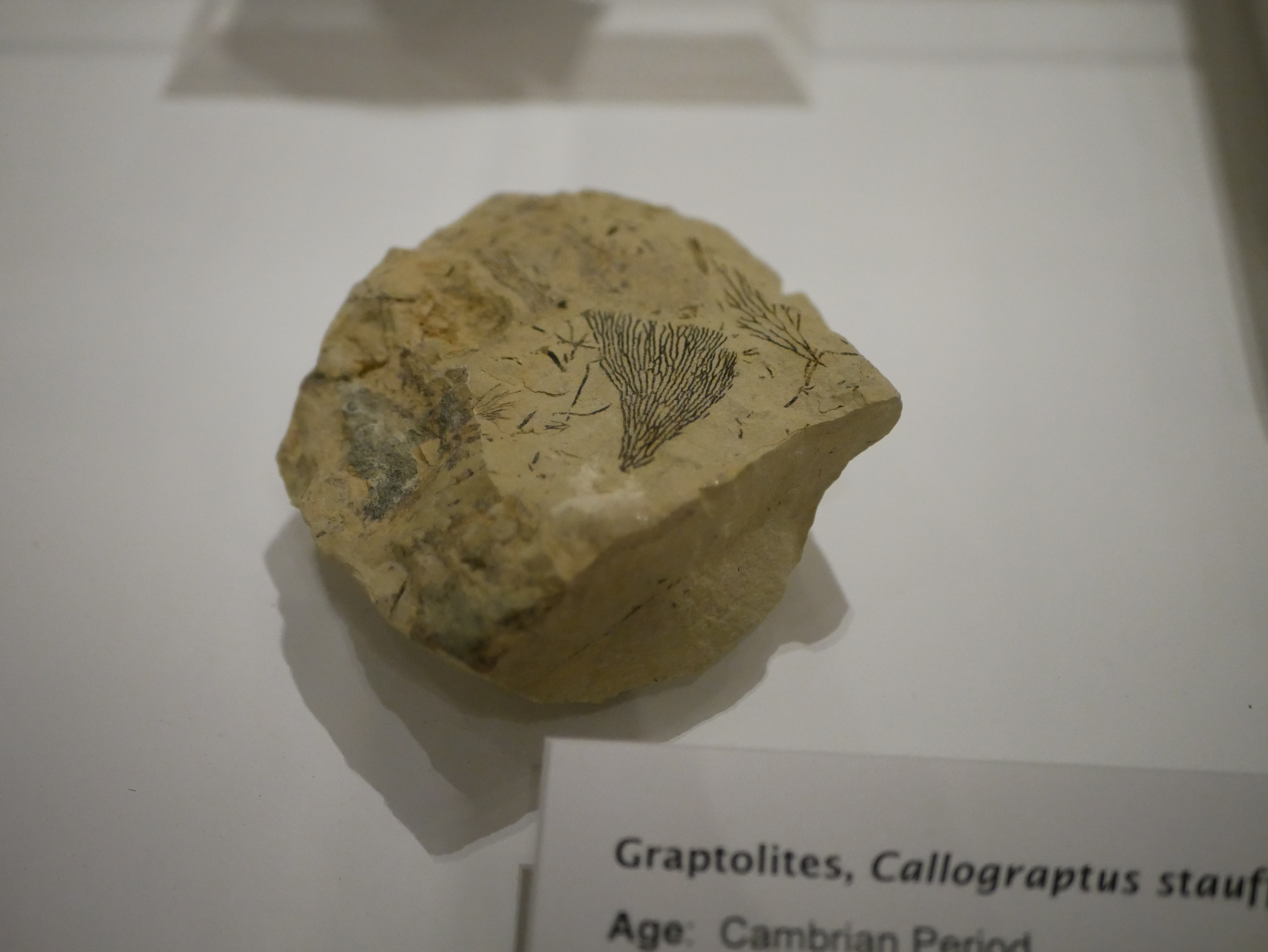
- Callograptus staufferi fossil

Scientific classification
- Kingdom: Animalia
- Phylum: Hemichordata
- Class: Pterobranchia
- Subclass: Graptolithina
- Order: †Dendroidea
- Family: †Callograptidae
- Genus: †Callograptus; Hall, 1865

Species
- †Callograptus diflusus Hall; †Callograptus elegans Hall, 1865; †Callograptus kaljoi Obut et Rytzk, 1958; †Callograptus monensis; †Callograptus radicans

= Callograptus =

Callograptus Temporal range: 501.0–339.4 Ma

Genus of marine worm-like animals

Callograptus is a genus of graptolites.
