= Harley, Shropshire =

Village in Shropshire, England

Coordinates: 52.610°N 2.598°W

Harley
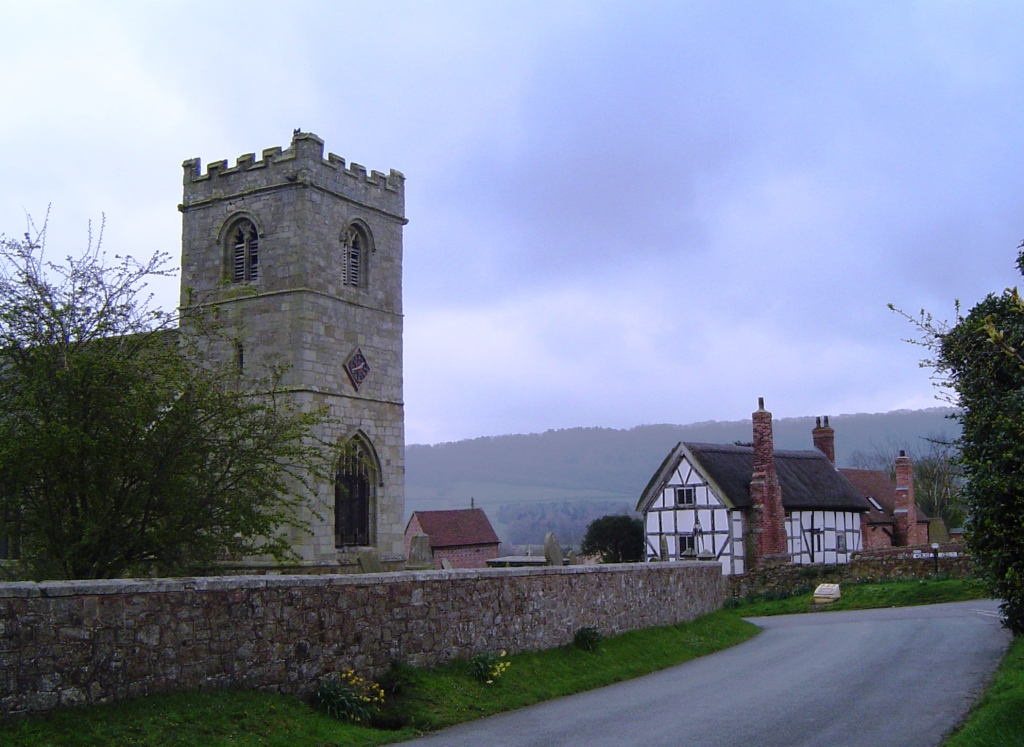
- Harley village with Wenlock Edge in the distance

- Location within Shropshire
- Population: 163 (2011)
- OS grid reference: SJ595015
- Civil parish: Harley
- Unitary authority: Shropshire
- Ceremonial county: Shropshire
- Region: West Midlands
- Country: England
- Sovereign state: United Kingdom
- Post town: SHREWSBURY
- Postcode district: SY5
- Dialling code: 01952
- Police: West Mercia
- Fire: Shropshire
- Ambulance: West Midlands
- UK Parliament: Shrewsbury and Atcham

Harley is a village and civil parish in the English county of Shropshire. The population of the civil parish at the 2011 census was 163.

== Location ==
The village lies at the foot of Wenlock Edge about 9.5 miles to the south-east of Shrewsbury. The A458 road Shrewsbury to Bridgnorth road goes around the village on a bypass. The village is about 105 metres (344 ft) above sea level on the southern slope of an extensive bed of sand and gravel, which creates an undulating landscape to the north-east of the parish. Harley Brook runs north-east across the centre of the village.

To the south east of the village is the market town of Much Wenlock. Nearby villages include Kenley, Cressage and Homer.

== History ==
There is evidence of prehistoric human activity around Harley, as stone implements and a settlement have been found in the area, and the site of a Roman villa has also been found nearby. Harley was recorded in the Domesday Book in 1086 as a manor with enough wood for 100 swine, and before 1066 the parish consisted of 4 manors: Harley, Domas, Rowley and Blakeway.

St Mary's parish church is first recorded in 1291, the medieval church consisting of a chancel, nave, north aisle and western tower. The small 13th-century tower was rebuilt in the early 16th century in Perpendicular style. This is the only part of the pre-Reformation church remaining, as it was mostly rebuilt in 1845-6 by a local architect Samuel Pountney Smith.

Until the 18th century the houses in the village were along the roads to Wigwig and Domas and between the church and the Mill on Harley Brook on the west side of the Wenlock road. The Old Rectory, to the west of the church, may be oldest surviving house, although it has been altered and enlarged over time. The oldest of the existing farmhouses appears to be Harley Forge Farm, to the west of the Domas road. It is a brick-cased timber-framed house, probably built in the early 17th century. The timber-framed house opposite the church is one of several timber-framed houses on the Wenlock road, but is unlikely to have been built before the 17th century.

In the 18th century the houses became more widely spaced and several were then rebuilt in stone, for example the Mill, the cottages on the church lands and Harley House. The farms became larger and less numerous. A crenellated brick tower built by John Corfield in 1791 gave its name to Castle Hill House, built in 1840 near Forge Farm on the Domas road. A stone bridge over the brook was built by Thomas Carline in 1843. The parish of Harley was amalgamated with neighbouring Kenley in 1939.

=== Thankful Village ===
Harley is one of the Thankful Villages – those few villages which saw no men lost in the First World War. The church contains a brass plaque honouring 20 men from Harley parish who 'by the grace of God' all returned after that war. In the Second World War one man from the parish, Leading Aircraftsman John Colin Preece, died, as a prisoner of war in Sumatra in 1945; in his memory the church has a brass plaque and a new heating system was installed in the building.

The village is featured on Darren Hayman's album, Thankful Villages Volume 3.

== Notable people ==
- Silas Taylor (1624-1678) the antiquary and music composer was born at Harley.
- Frances Pitt (1888-1964) the naturalist and pioneer wildlife photographer, lived at Castle House, Harley, from 1958.

== See also ==
- Listed buildings in Harley, Shropshire
