= Frances Pitt =

British naturalist, author and photographer

- Born: 25 January 1888; Oldbury Grange, England
- Died: 26 April 1964
- Occupation(s): Naturalist, author, photographer
- Father: William James Pitt

Frances Pitt (25 January 1888 – 26 April 1964) was a British naturalist, author and a pioneer of wildlife photography. She wrote many books and numerous popular articles in periodicals on the lives of many wild animals by observations in the wild and in the process of raising and nursing injured animals. She lived at "The Albynes", Shropshire, three miles south of Bridgnorth from 1903 until 1958 when she moved to Castle House, Harley near Much Wenlock.

== Early life and education ==
Frances Pitt was born at Oldbury Grange, Shropshire before the family moved to Westwood in 1892. Her father William James Pitt, was the son of the vicar of the Parish of Malmesbury, Wiltshire. She learnt to read and write from her mother and was tutored by a Mr Carter and a governess. Some of her early influences were the books by Ernest Thompson Seton.

== Career ==
Her early books were based on experience in taking care of wild animals and these included Tommy White-Tag, the fox (1912) followed by more personal titles in a series called "The Library Of Animal Friends" which included Tom, my peacock; Moses, my otter (1927) and Katie, my roving cat (1930). In Diana, My Badger published in 1929, she described her experience in raising a pair of baby badgers brought to her by a rabbit catcher. Of the pair, Diana and Jemima, Diana lived to return to the wild. In the early 1920s she wrote on the genetics and inheritance of colour patterning in Hereford cattle and on the traits of hybrids between ferrets and polecats. In 1934, she wrote on the increasing trends in badger populations. She also wrote on the topic of hunting in Hounds, horses & hunting (1948). Her book The Squirrel published in 1954 was based on an albino squirrel named "Mr Nuts". She was among the first (the first was Miss Phyllis Kelway) to breed harvest mice in captivity. She published Wild animals in Britain in 1939, and regularly wrote to comment and report on wildlife observations. In 1945, she reported the observations made by Lady Seton (wife of Sir Malcolm Seton) on the mass movements of water shrews. In 1949, she was included along with Peter Medawar and others in a committee to examine cruelty to wild animals which led to protests from the National Society for the Abolition of Cruel Sports who pointed out her position as a Master of Fox Hounds and as vice-president of the British Field Sports Society.

In 1954, Edglets, a brand of tea sold by Brooke Bond included a series of illustrated cards with British birds photographed by Frances Pitt. Her collection of insects is now in the Ludlow Museum although the specimens lack dates and locality data. She was elected Fellow of the Linnean Society in 1951. She published Country years being a naturalist's memories of life in the English countryside and elsewhere in 1961, with many autobiographical notes.

== Selected publications ==
Among the numerous books that Frances Pitt wrote are:

- Tommy White-Tag, the fox (1912)
- Wild creatures of garden and hedgerow (1920)
- Woodland creatures: Being Some Wild Life Studies (1922)
- Shetland pirates, and other wild life studies (1923)
- Waterside creatures (1925)
- Animal mind (1927)
- The intelligence of animals (1931)
- Scotty, the adventures of a highland fox (1932)
- The naturalist on the prowl (1934)
- Birds and the sea (1935)
- Woodpeckers
- Wild life studies (1935)
- Nature in the wild: a selection of the world's finest photographs (1936)
- How to see nature (1940)
- Jane Squirrel (1942)
- Betty (1943)
- Meet Us in the Garden (1946)
- Friends in fur and feather (1946)
- The year in the countryside (1947)
- Hounds, horses & hunting (1948)
- Follow me (1949)
- Nature through the year (1950)
