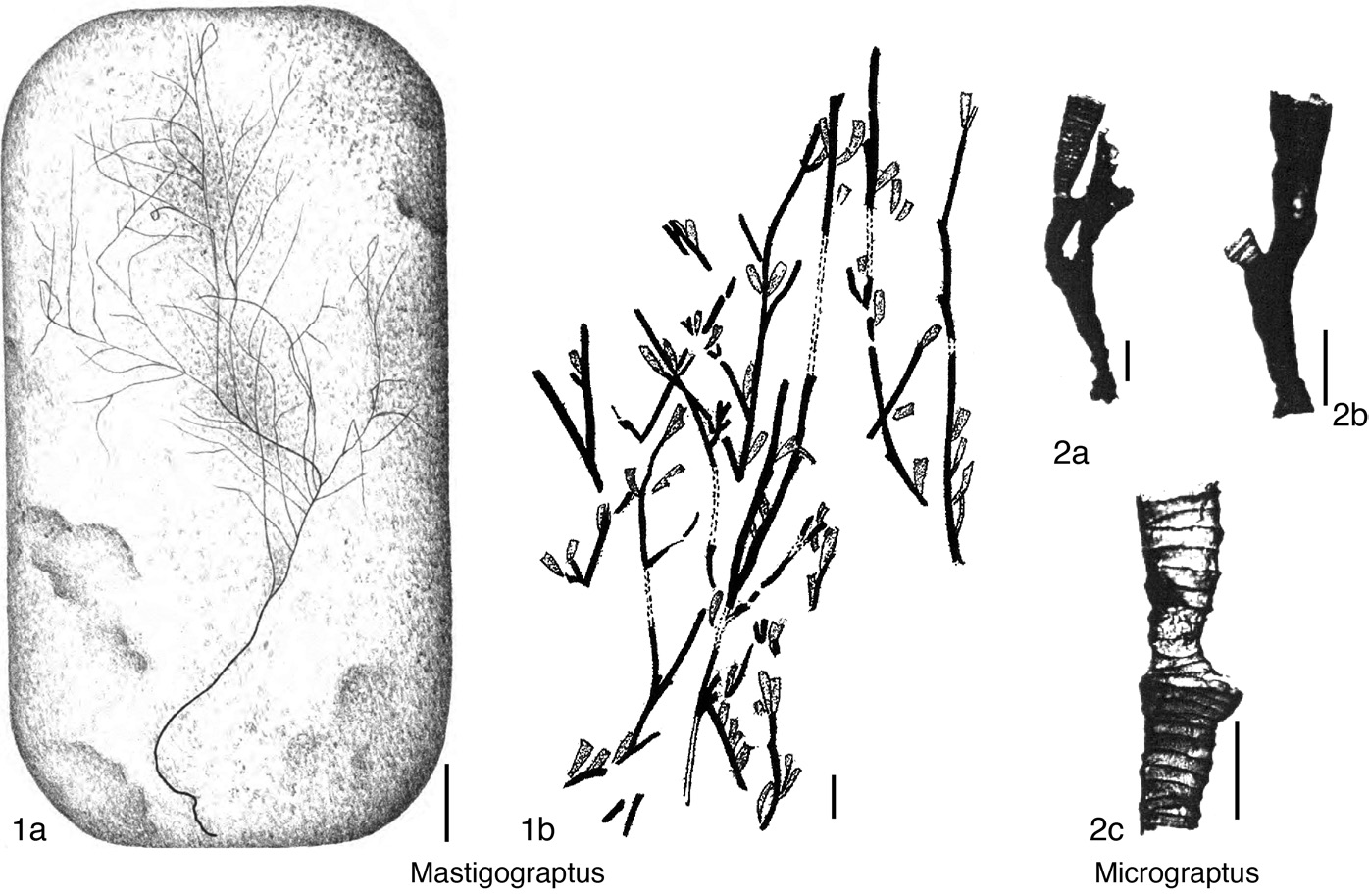
- Members of Mastigograptidae

Scientific classification
- Kingdom: Animalia
- Phylum: Hemichordata
- Class: Pterobranchia
- Subclass: Graptolithina
- Order: †Dendroidea
- Family: †Mastigograptidae; Bates & Urbanek, 2002

Genera
- See Genera

= Mastigograptidae =

Mastigograptidae Temporal range: Middle Ordovician (Darriwilian)–Upper Ordovician (Katian)

Extinct family of graptolites

Mastigograptidae is an extinct family of graptolites.

== Genera ==
Based on Maletz (2020), the following genera are recognised in the family Mastigograptidae.

- †Mastigograptus Ruedemann, 1908
- †Micrograptus Eisenack, 1974
