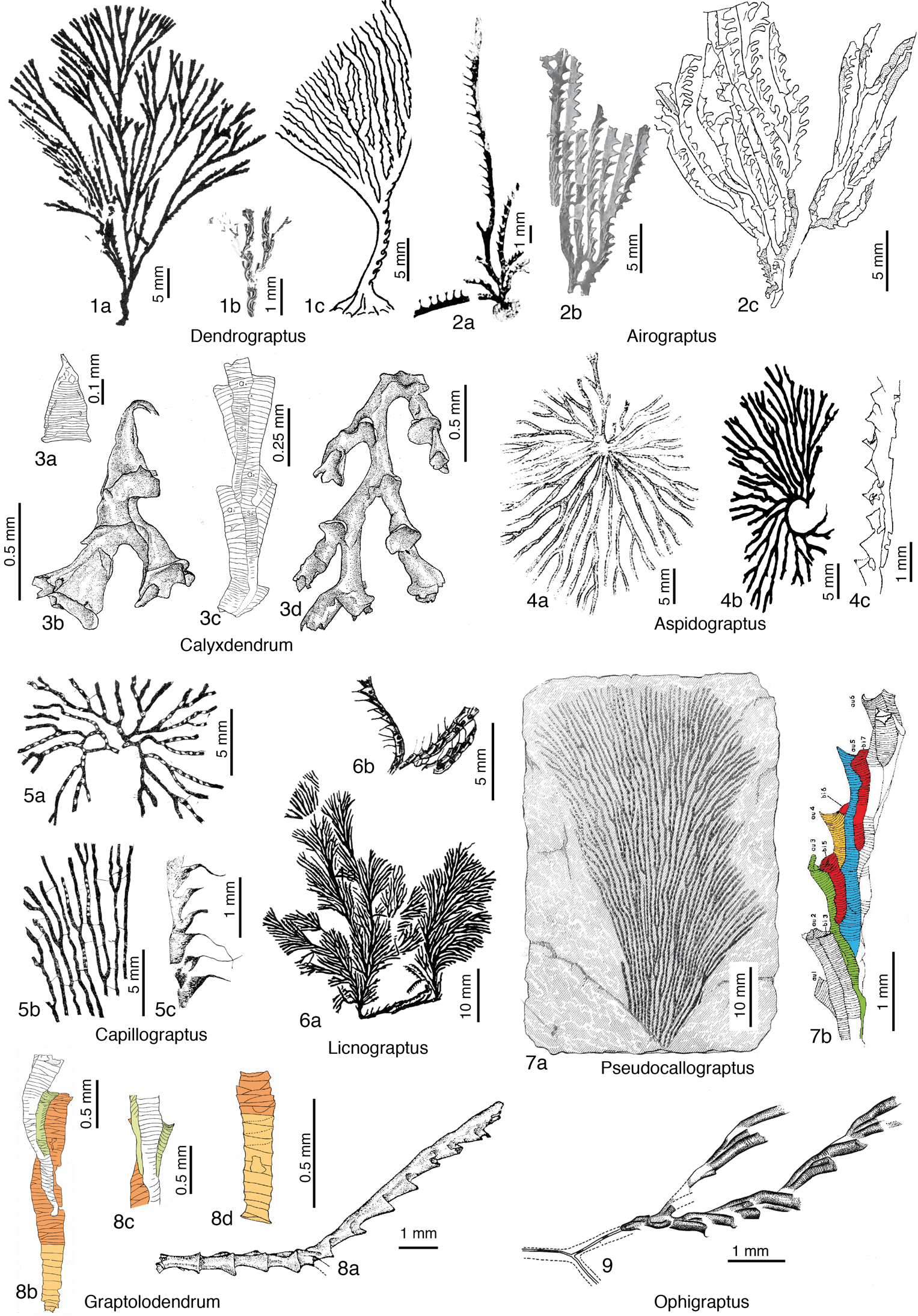
- Various members of Dendrograptidae

Scientific classification
- Kingdom: Animalia
- Phylum: Hemichordata
- Class: Pterobranchia
- Subclass: Graptolithina
- Order: †Dendroidea
- Family: †Dendrograptidae; Roemer in Frech, 1897

Genera
- See Genera

= Dendrograptidae =

Dendrograptidae Temporal range: Cambrian (Miaolingian)–Lower Devonian (uppermost Emsian to lowermost Eifelian)

Extinct family of graptolites

Dendrograptidae is an extinct family of graptolites.

== Genera ==
Based on Maletz (2020), the following genera are recognised in the family Dendrograptidae.

- †Airograptus Ruedemann, 1916
- †Aspidograptus Bulman, 1934
- †Calyxdendrum Kozłowski, 1960
- †Capillograptus Bouček, 1957
- †Dendrograptus Hall, 1858
- †Graptolodendrum Kozłowski, 1966
- †Licnograptus Ruedemann, 1947
- †Ophigraptus Jaeger, 1992
- †Pseudocallograptus Skevington, 1963
