= Anthraconite =

Mineral that produces an unpleasant odour

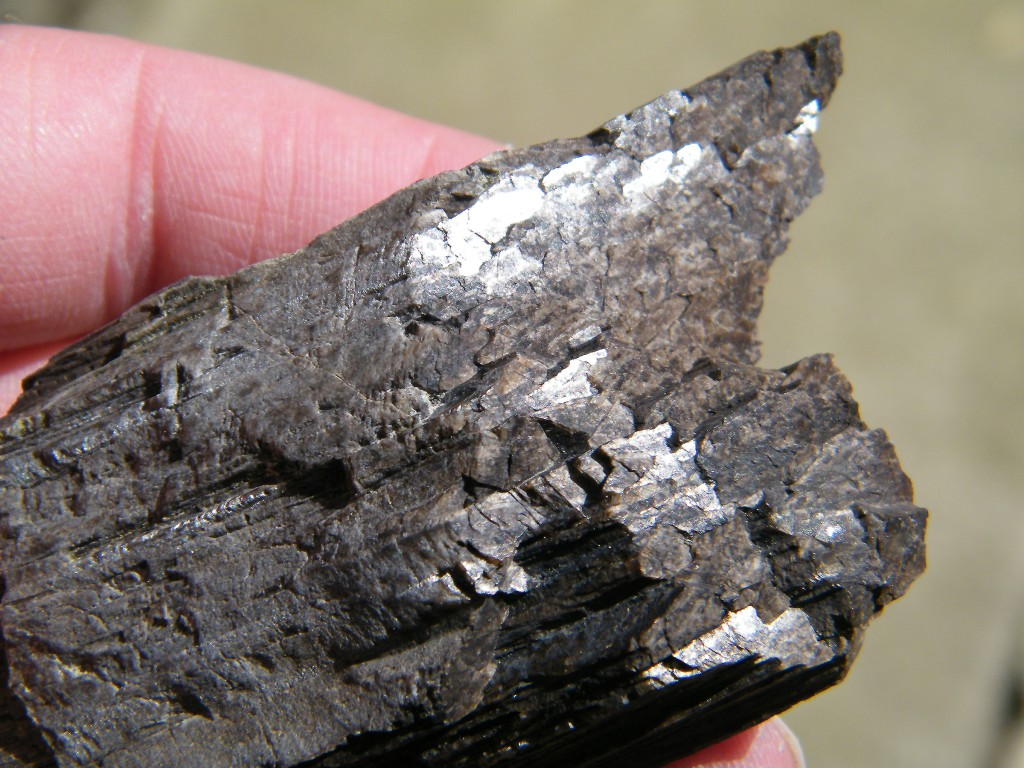
Calcite, variety Anthraconite Locality: Squaw Bay, Alpena County, Michigan, USA

Anthraconite (also spelled as anthraxonite) or stinkstone is a form of black to grey, bituminous bearing marble, calcite or limestone which produces an unpleasant odour when struck or rubbed. It is also known as pietra fetida. It is thought to have been formed when limestone is deposited under anaerobic conditions. Some anthraconite releases enough petroleum when struck, that it may be lit. At least one locality where it is found is in the vicinity of Traverse City, Michigan.
