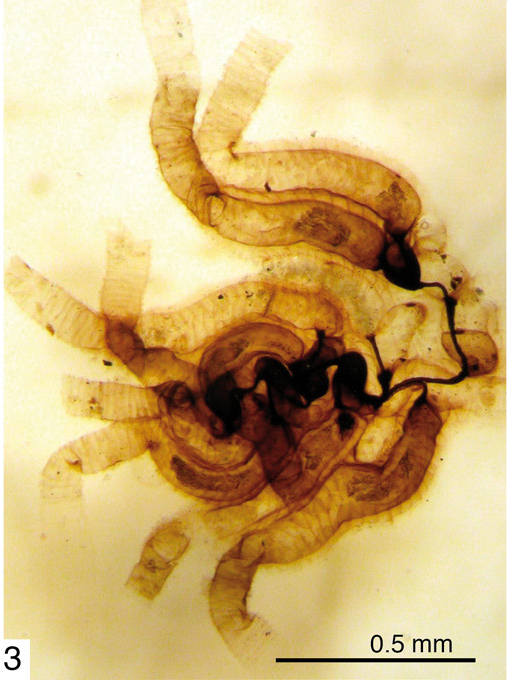

Scientific classification
- Kingdom: Animalia
- Phylum: Hemichordata
- Class: Pterobranchia
- Subclass: Graptolithina
- Order: Rhabdopleurida
- Family: Rhabdopleuridae
- Genus: Rhabdopleura
- Species: R. compacta

Binomial name
- Rhabdopleura compacta Hincks, 1880

= Rhabdopleura compacta =

Species of hemichordates in the pterobranchian class

Rhabdopleura compacta is a sessile hemichordate. It is a suspension feeder that secretes tubes on the ocean floor.

Unlike all other Rhabdopleura species, the zooids have black elongated arms with no tentacles.

== Distribution ==
Rhabdopleura compacta occurs in Atlantic waters. It has been found in the English Channel and the Gulf of Mexico.

== Reproduction and life cycle ==
The reproduction and life cycle of Rhabdopleura compacta has been studied by Stebbing (1970) and Dilly (1973).
