= Homer, Shropshire =

Village in Shropshire, England

Coordinates: 52.610°N 2.565°W

Homer
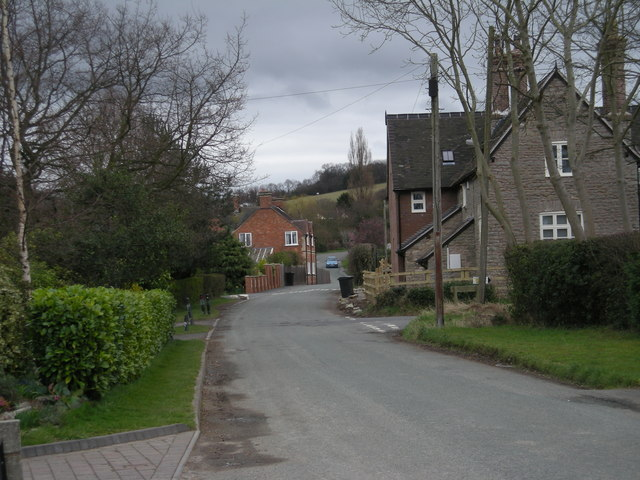
- Homer, Shropshire

- Location within Shropshire
- OS grid reference: SJ617015
- Civil parish: Much Wenlock
- Unitary authority: Shropshire
- Ceremonial county: Shropshire
- Region: West Midlands
- Country: England
- Sovereign state: United Kingdom
- Post town: MUCH WENLOCK
- Postcode district: TF13
- Dialling code: 01952
- Police: West Mercia
- Fire: Shropshire
- Ambulance: West Midlands
- UK Parliament: Ludlow

Homer is a small village in Shropshire, England, north of the town of Much Wenlock.

The name first appears in the 14th century as "Honemor". Originally common land called Homer Wood, the settlement developed from squatters' cottages encroaching on the common during the 17th century. During the 19th century it served as accommodation for quarrymen and farm labourers.

The village expanded in the later 20th century with the construction of modern houses.

The Homerian, a stage of the Wenlock geologic epoch and Silurian geologic period, is named after the village of Homer. The Global Boundary Stratotype Section and Point defining the stage is located in Whitwell Coppice near the village.

== Wigwig ==
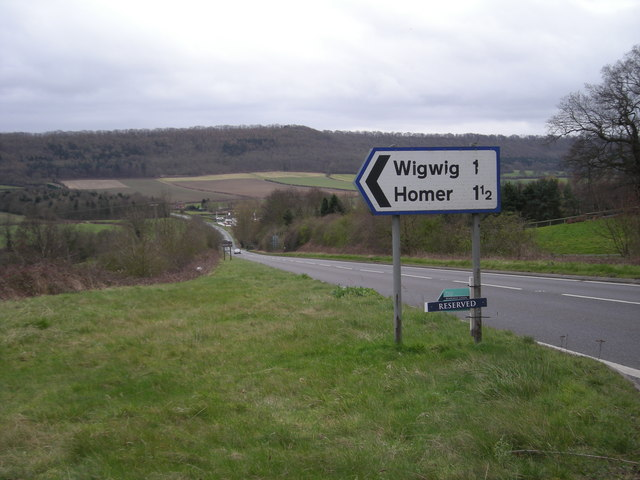
Sign to Wigwig and Homer at Harley.

A short distance to the west of Homer is a very small hamlet with the unusual name of Wigwig. Wigwig was an ancient township of Much Wenlock parish: its name, recorded in the Domesday Book as "Wigewic", is probably derived from an Old English personal name Wyga, along with wic, "settlement" ("Wyga's settlement"). It has also been spelt Wig Wig or Wigwick. There is a ford across the Harley Brook here.

Wigwig once had a mill on the Harley Brook; mentioned as early as 1291, it operated variously as a fulling mill and corn mill but closed during the 19th century, although it is still referenced in the name of the Mill Farm nearby.

The villages' names inspired the title and main characters of a 1969 children's book, Wigwig and Homer (Oxford University Press) by Philip Turner.
