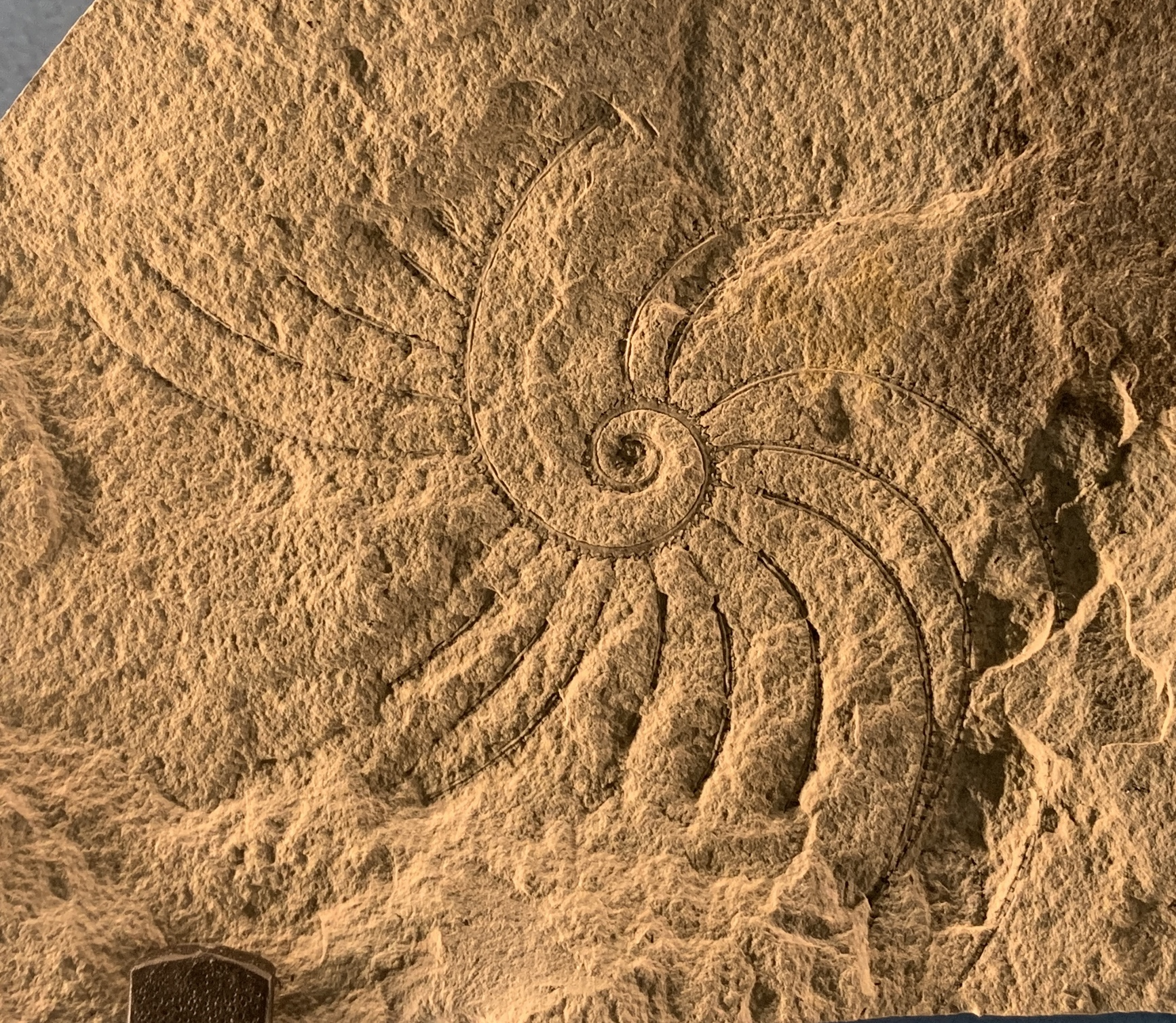
- Cyrtograptus canadensis

Scientific classification
- Kingdom: Animalia
- Phylum: Hemichordata
- Class: Pterobranchia
- Subclass: Graptolithina
- Order: †Graptoloidea
- Genus: †Cyrtograptus

= Cyrtograptus =

Genus of marine worm-like animals

Cyrtograptus is an extinct genus of graptolites.

Cyrtograptus grayianus (now a synonym) was brought to a meeting of the Geological Society of Glasgow and its name was suggested to honour Elizabeth Gray, the woman who found it.
