= Saccoglossus bromophenolosus =

Scientific classification
- Kingdom: Animalia
- Phylum: Hemichordata
- Class: Enteropneusta
- Family: Harrimaniidae
- Genus: Saccoglossus
- Species: S. bromophenolosus

Binomial name
- Saccoglossus bromophenolosus King, Giray & Kornfield, 1994

Species of marine worm-like animal

Saccoglossus bromophenolosus is a species of acorn worm (class Enteropneusta) occurring in the northwestern Atlantic Ocean and the northeastern Pacific Ocean. It grows to a length of about 20 cm (8 in) and lives in a burrow in soft sediment in the intertidal and subtidal zones. The scientific name refers to 2,4-dibromophenol, a secondary metabolite present in this worm.

== Description ==
Like other acorn worms, this soft cylindrical worm is divided into three parts, the proboscis, the collar and the trunk. The proboscis is long and slender with a groove along the top. The mouth is located on the underside where it joins the thick, fleshy collar. A fold at the back of the collar overhangs the trunk, and the anus is at the tip of the trunk. The total length is up to 20 cm (8 in), the proboscis is white to beige, the collar is orange, red or reddish-green and the trunk is either brownish-green or rather pale.

== Distribution and habitat ==
The species is native to the northwestern Atlantic Ocean where its range extends from Maine to Nova Scotia. It is also present in the northeastern Pacific Ocean, in Padilla Bay and Willapa Bay in Washington state, where it is thought to have been introduced with a consignment of oysters from the east coast. It is typically found burrowing in mud, mostly in the intertidal zone, but also subtidally down to about 100 m (330 ft).

== Biology ==
Saccoglossus bromophenolosus moves through the sediment by thrusting its proboscis forward and then contracting it longitudinally to form a swelling. This bulge is then worked backwards along the proboscis, which pulls the worm forwards. The collar and trunk follow passively. The beating of cilia also helps move sand and silt. Food particles are trapped in mucus and moved to the mouth by ciliary action, and the worm also swallows a lot of sediment and presumably obtains some nourishment from detritus. The sexes are separate. Fertilisation takes place in the water column. The eggs are yolky and large and development is direct, without a mobile larval stage.

The worm contains high concentrations of 2,4-dibromophenol in its tissues. It is unclear what function this serves, but it may deter predators or convey some measure of resistance to microorganisms.
