= Cephalodiscus fumosus =

Scientific classification
- Kingdom: Animalia
- Phylum: Hemichordata
- Class: Pterobranchia
- Order: Cephalodiscida
- Family: Cephalodiscidae
- Genus: Cephalodiscus
- Species: C. fumosus

Binomial name
- Cephalodiscus fumosus John, 1931

Species of hemichordate

Cephalodiscus fumosus is a sessile hemichordate belonging to the order Cephalodiscida.
