= Cephalodiscus evansi =

Scientific classification
- Kingdom: Animalia
- Phylum: Hemichordata
- Class: Pterobranchia
- Order: Cephalodiscida
- Family: Cephalodiscidae
- Genus: Cephalodiscus
- Species: C. evansi

Binomial name
- Cephalodiscus evansi Ridewood, 1918

Species of hemichordate

Cephalodiscus evansi is a sessile hemichordate belonging to the order Cephalodiscida.
