= Mesoglossus =

Scientific classification
- Kingdom: Animalia
- Phylum: Hemichordata
- Class: Enteropneusta
- Family: Harrimaniidae
- Genus: Mesoglossus; Deland, Cameron, Rao, Ritter & Bullock, 2010

Genus of Enteropneusta

Mesoglossus is a genus of worms belonging to the family Harrimaniidae.

Species:

- Mesoglossus bournei (Menon, 1903)
- Mesoglossus caraibicus (van der Horst, 1924)
- Mesoglossus gurneyi (Robinson, 1927)
- Mesoglossus intermedius Deland, Cameron, Rao, Ritter & Bullock, 2010
- Mesoglossus macginitiei Deland, Cameron, Rao, Ritter & Bullock, 2010
- Mesoglossus pygmaeus (Hinrichs & Jacobi, 1938)
