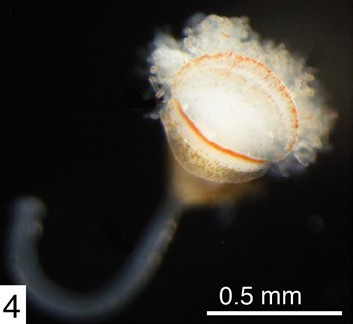
- Ventral view of a zooid of Cephalodiscus planitectus

Scientific classification
- Kingdom: Animalia
- Phylum: Hemichordata
- Class: Pterobranchia
- Order: Cephalodiscida
- Family: Cephalodiscidae
- Genus: Cephalodiscus
- Species: C. planitectus

Binomial name
- Cephalodiscus planitectus Miyamoto, Nishikawa and Namikawa, 2020

= Cephalodiscus planitectus =

Species of hemichordate

Cephalodiscus planitectus is a sessile hemichordate belonging to the order Cephalodiscida.

== Distribution ==
It is found at a depth of 100–300 metres off the island of Jōgashima, Sagami Bay, Japan.

== Anatomy ==
There are three pairs of arms with tentacles.

== Phylogenetics ==
Cephalodiscus planitectus is the most divergent of all Cephalodiscus species, with Miyamoto, Nishikawa and Namikawa (2020) suggesting that it constitutes a sister group to all existing Cephalodiscus species.
