= Cephalodiscus nusplingensis =

Cephalodiscus nusplingensis Temporal range: Upper Jurassic

Scientific classification
- Kingdom: Animalia
- Phylum: Hemichordata
- Class: Pterobranchia
- Order: Cephalodiscida
- Family: Cephalodiscidae
- Genus: Cephalodiscus
- Species: †C. nusplingensis

Binomial name
- †Cephalodiscus nusplingensis Schweigert & Dietl 2013

Species of hemichordate

Cephalodiscus nusplingensis is an extinct hemichordate species from the Upper Jurassic of southwestern Germany.
