= Cephalodiscus indicus =

Scientific classification
- Kingdom: Animalia
- Phylum: Hemichordata
- Class: Pterobranchia
- Order: Cephalodiscida
- Family: Cephalodiscidae
- Genus: Cephalodiscus
- Species: C. indicus

Binomial name
- Cephalodiscus indicus Schepotieff, 1909

Species of hemichordate

Cephalodiscus indicus is a sessile hemichordate belonging to the order Cephalodiscida.
