= Mesoglossus intermedius =

Scientific classification
- Kingdom: Animalia
- Phylum: Hemichordata
- Class: Enteropneusta
- Family: Harrimaniidae
- Genus: Mesoglossus
- Species: M. intermedius

Binomial name
- Mesoglossus intermedius Deland, Cameron, Rao, Ritter & Bullock, 2010

Species of marine worm-like animal

Mesoglossus intermedius is a species of acorn worms in the family Harrimaniidae, which is endemic to Northern California.
