= Cephalodiscus gilchristi =

Scientific classification
- Kingdom: Animalia
- Phylum: Hemichordata
- Class: Pterobranchia
- Order: Cephalodiscida
- Family: Cephalodiscidae
- Genus: Cephalodiscus
- Species: C. gilchristi

Binomial name
- Cephalodiscus gilchristi Ridewood, 1908

Species of hemichordate

Cephalodiscus gilchristi is a sessile hemichordate belonging to the order Cephalodiscida. It is found in South Africa in 1908.

== Parasites ==
The parasitic copepod Zanclopus cephalodisci has been found in the intestines of Cephalodiscus gilchristi.

== Isolated molecules ==
Cephalostatin-1, is a steroidic 13-ringed pyrazine with the empirical formula C_{54}H_{74}N_{2}O_{10} that was isolated from Cephalodiscus gilchristi. It is a potent anti-cancer agent that causes cell death in the subnanomolar to picomolar ranges via an atypical apoptosis pathway.
