= Ritteria =

Scientific classification
- Kingdom: Animalia
- Phylum: Hemichordata
- Class: Enteropneusta
- Family: Harrimaniidae
- Genus: Ritteria; Deland, Cameron, Rao, Ritter & Bullock, 2010
- Species: R. ambigua

Binomial name
- Ritteria ambigua Deland, Cameron, Rao, Ritter & Bullock, 2010

Genus of acorn worms

Ritteria is a monotypic genus of worms belonging to the family Harrimaniidae. The only species is Ritteria ambigua.

The species is found in Eastern Pacific.
