= Cephalodiscus graptolitoides =

Scientific classification
- Kingdom: Animalia
- Phylum: Hemichordata
- Class: Pterobranchia
- Order: Cephalodiscida
- Family: Cephalodiscidae
- Genus: Cephalodiscus
- Species: C. graptolitoides

Binomial name
- Cephalodiscus graptolitoides Dilly, 1993

Species of hemichordate

Cephalodiscus graptolitoides is a sessile hemichordate belonging to the order Cephalodiscida.

It has encrusting tubaria.
