= Cephalodiscus gracilis =

Scientific classification
- Kingdom: Animalia
- Phylum: Hemichordata
- Class: Pterobranchia
- Order: Cephalodiscida
- Family: Cephalodiscidae
- Genus: Cephalodiscus
- Species: C. gracilis

Binomial name
- Cephalodiscus gracilis Harmer, 1905

Species of hemichordate

Cephalodiscus gracilis is a sessile hemichordate belonging to the order Cephalodiscida.
