= Cephalodiscus hodgsoni =

Scientific classification
- Kingdom: Animalia
- Phylum: Hemichordata
- Class: Pterobranchia
- Order: Cephalodiscida
- Family: Cephalodiscidae
- Genus: Cephalodiscus
- Species: C. hodgsoni

Binomial name
- Cephalodiscus hodgsoni Ridewood, 1907

Species of hemichordate

Cephalodiscus hodgsoni is a sessile hemichordate belonging to the order Cephalodiscida.
