= Harrimania maculosa =

Scientific classification
- Kingdom: Animalia
- Phylum: Hemichordata
- Class: Enteropneusta
- Family: Harrimaniidae
- Genus: Harrimania
- Species: H. maculosa

Binomial name
- Harrimania maculosa Ritter, 1900

Species of hemichordate

Harrimania maculosa is a marine acorn worm species in the family Harrimaniidae.

== Description ==
It has a very distinct notochord, as well as dorsal and lateral gonads.

== Habitat ==
It is endemic to the state of Alaska.
