= Harrimania =

Scientific classification
- Kingdom: Animalia
- Phylum: Hemichordata
- Class: Enteropneusta
- Family: Harrimaniidae
- Genus: Harrimania; Ritter, 1900

Type species
- Harrimania maculosa Ritter, 1900

Genus of hemichordates

Harrimania is a genus of acorn worms belonging to the family Harrimaniidae.

The species of this genus are found in Europe.

Species:

- Harrimania borealis (Okuda & Yamada, 1955)
- Harrimania kupfferi (von Willemoes-Suhm, 1871)
- Harrimania maculosa Ritter, 1900
- Harrimania planktophilus Cameron, 2002
