= Glossobalanus marginatus =

Scientific classification
- Kingdom: Animalia
- Phylum: Hemichordata
- Class: Enteropneusta
- Family: Ptychoderidae
- Genus: Glossobalanus
- Species: G. marginatus

Binomial name
- Glossobalanus marginatus Meek, 1922

Species of acorn worm

Glossobalanus marginatus is a species of acorn worm within the family Ptychoderidae. The species was first described from a specimen caught off the Northumberland coast on August 22, 1921, where its discovery extended the known range of acorn worms to the North Sea and coasts of British Isles. The species inhabits marine waters of the North Sea, Baltic Sea, and coasts of the British Isles. The species grows to a length of 15 millimeters.
