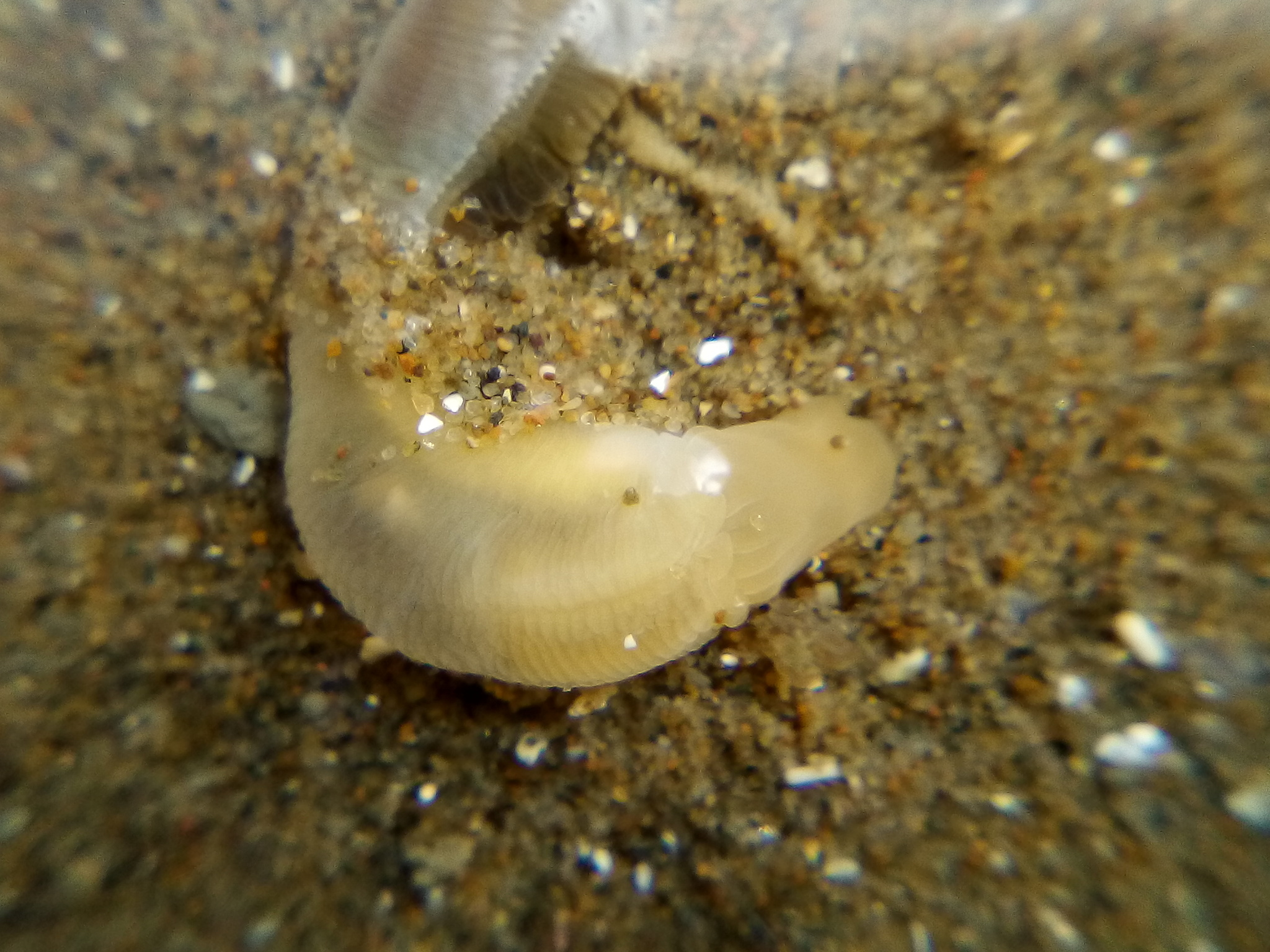

Scientific classification
- Kingdom: Animalia
- Phylum: Hemichordata
- Class: Enteropneusta
- Family: Ptychoderidae
- Genus: Balanoglossus
- Species: B. australiensis

Binomial name
- Balanoglossus australiensis Hill, 1894

= Balanoglossus australiensis =

Species of hemichordates

Balanoglossus australiensis is a species of 20 centimetres (7.9 in) long acorn worm in Ptychoderidae family which can be found in Gulf of Carpentaria, New Zealand, Australian cities such as Hawkesbury and Manning as well as Solomon Archipelago and its sea. Their habitat consists of 8–10 inches (200–250 mm) deep sandy burrows where they feed on Ubius species.
