= Mesoglossus pygmaeus =

Scientific classification
- Kingdom: Animalia
- Phylum: Hemichordata
- Class: Enteropneusta
- Family: Harrimaniidae
- Genus: Mesoglossus
- Species: M. pygmaeus

Binomial name
- Mesoglossus pygmaeus Hinrichs & Jacobi, 1938

Synonyms
- Saccoglossus pygmaeus Hinrichs & Jacobi, 1938

Species of marine worm-like animal

Mesoglossus pygmaeus is a species of acorn worm in the family Harrimaniidae, which is found in Europe, precisely in British Isles.
