= Harrimania planktophilus =

Scientific classification
- Kingdom: Animalia
- Phylum: Hemichordata
- Class: Enteropneusta
- Family: Harrimaniidae
- Genus: Harrimania
- Species: H. planktophilus

Binomial name
- Harrimania planktophilus Cameron, 2002

Species of marine worm-like animal

Harrimania planktophilus is a marine acorn worm in the family Harrimaniidae. It lives in a burrow in sediment on the sea floor. It is only known from western Canada and was first described by Cameron in 2002. The species name is from the Greek and translates as "lover of plankton".

== Description ==
Harrimania planktophilus can grow to about 6 cm (2.5 in) long but is more typically 3.5 cm. Though generally cylindrical, the body is divided into several distinct regions, having a short cream-coloured, extendible proboscis, an orange collar and a long yellow and grey trunk. The proboscis has a dorsal groove and is cone-shaped, being rather longer than it is wide. It contains a skeleton which extends into the anterior part of the trunk. Near the front of the short, wide collar is a circumbuccal groove in which the mouth is situated. Contractions of its muscular lip cause the size and shape of the mouth to vary. There is a small brown pit where the collar meets the trunk and the latter is subdivided into four parts. The long branchial region has up to 54 pairs of gill pores opening dorsally. It is followed by an esophageal region with a distinctive reddish-coloured oesophagus. Posterior to this is a dark-coloured hepatic region and a long greyish intestinal region. This is transparent and the gut is visible meandering to its termination at the anus, which is controlled by a strong sphincter. In mature individuals, the gonads are long dark masses and extend dorsally most of the way down the trunk.

== Distribution and habitat ==
Harrimania planktophilus has been found at two locations in Barklay Sound, Vancouver Island, Canada. It lives in burrows in the sand either in the intertidal zone or below low water mark. It favours areas with a high concentration of calcium carbonate provided by mollusc shell fragments, barnacle plates, foraminifera and other invertebrate debris. It is photo-negative and avoids emerging on the sea floor. Several individuals may share the same burrow system.

== Biology ==
Compared with other members of the genus, H. planktophilus is robust and active. It feeds by trapping particle with the mucus that coats its proboscis, and then wafting these back to the mouth by means of cilia. It is also a filter feeder, using pharyngeal cilia to create a current which pumps water through its mouth, where plankton and other organic particles are extracted, and out through its gill pores.

Harrimania planktophilus is dioecious, with individuals being either male or female. The yellow eggs are deposited in a hollow, cylindrical, jellylike mass in the burrow. Adults can pass through the centre of this. The outer side of the mass is coated in debris while the inner side is clean. When the larvae hatch, they pass through a number of ciliated, spherical and hemispherical developmental stages before becoming vermiform juveniles and developing the proboscis, collar and trunk of the adult. The juveniles can travel forward and backwards by beating their cilia, moving as far as a body length in two seconds.
