= Cephalodiscus agglutinans =

Scientific classification
- Kingdom: Animalia
- Phylum: Hemichordata
- Class: Pterobranchia
- Order: Cephalodiscida
- Family: Cephalodiscidae
- Genus: Cephalodiscus
- Species: C. agglutinans

Binomial name
- Cephalodiscus agglutinans Harmer & Ridewood, 1913

Species of hemichordate

Cephalodiscus agglutinans is a sessile hemichordate belonging to the order Cephalodiscida.
