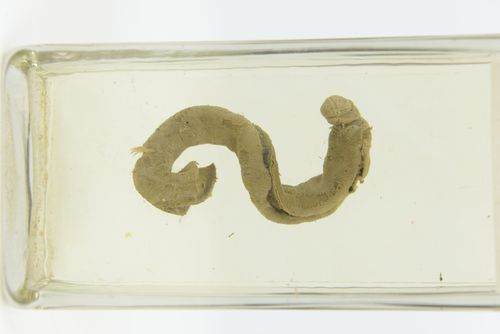

Scientific classification
- Kingdom: Animalia
- Phylum: Hemichordata
- Class: Enteropneusta
- Family: Ptychoderidae
- Genus: Balanoglossus
- Species: B. gigas

Binomial name
- Balanoglossus gigas (Müller in Spengel, 1893)

Synonyms
- Balanoglossus biminiensis Willey, 1899; Ptychodera gigas Fr. Müller in Spengel, 1893 (basionym); Ptychodera (Tauroglossus) gigas (Fr. Müller in Spengel, 1893)

= Balanoglossus gigas =

Largest known Enteropneust (acorn worm)

Balanoglossus gigas is a species of large free-living enteropneust (acorn worm) found in the Atlantic Ocean. It is the largest acorn worm currently known, and has a strong iodoform-like odour. It is bioluminescent.

== Description ==
=== Size ===
Balanoglossus gigas is recorded as growing to 1.5 metres (4.9 ft) in length, and is thus considered the largest acorn worm currently known. One specimen from the Brazilian coast was recorded as measuring 1.8 metres in length.

=== Chemical accumulations ===
When handled, B. gigas releases thick, sticky mucus with a strong smell of iodoform, which may serve as a deterrent to predators. The odour is caused by 2,6-dibromophenol, a phenol also reported from crustaceans, where it is the cause of a similar odour.

Balanoglossus gigas also has accumulation of iodine throughout its body, something reported from no other acorn worm or protochordate. The iodine concentration is highest in the hepatic (liver) region, and lowest in the proboscis. Other compounds were also found to be present in accumulations in the body of B. gigas: high concentrations of calcium were found in the skeleton, while phosphate was found in the proboscis, copper in the collar and the skeleton, chloride in the collar and branchial area, iron in the hepatic region, nitrogen in the genital and hepatic regions, and a mix of sodium, calcium, potassium and magnesium found at both the front and back of the body.

=== Bioluminescence ===
A multipart study in the 1960s assessed the bioluminescence of Balanoglossus biminiensis, since synonymized with B. gigas. The reaction causing bioluminescence incorporates hydrogen peroxide and a luciferin common to balanglossids.

== Distribution and habitat ==
Balanoglossus gigas are found off the coasts of the U.S. state of Georgia, Brazil, Cuba, and in the Gulf of Mexico. Like most acorn worms, B. gigas specimens prefer somewhat sheltered habitats with surface layers of fine sand lying above layers of fine to coarse gravel. They live in burrows with thin mucous lining on the sea floor. The burrows typically measure less than 2 cm in width and beyond 2 meters in length.
