= Mesoglossus caraibicus =

Scientific classification
- Kingdom: Animalia
- Phylum: Hemichordata
- Class: Enteropneusta
- Family: Harrimaniidae
- Genus: Mesoglossus
- Species: M. caraibicus

Binomial name
- Mesoglossus caraibicus van der Horst, 1924

Species of marine worm-like animal

Mesoglossus caraibicus is a species of acorn worm in the family Harrimaniidae, which can be found on Bahamas, Greater Antilles, Southern Caribbean, and Gulf of Mexico.
