= Cephalodiscus sibogae =

Scientific classification
- Kingdom: Animalia
- Phylum: Hemichordata
- Class: Pterobranchia
- Order: Cephalodiscida
- Family: Cephalodiscidae
- Genus: Cephalodiscus
- Species: C. sibogae

Binomial name
- Cephalodiscus sibogae Harmer, 1905

Species of hemichordate

Cephalodiscus sibogae is a sessile hemichordate belonging to the order Cephalodiscida. Sightings of the species has been reported only once.
