= Cephalodiscus kempi =

Scientific classification
- Kingdom: Animalia
- Phylum: Hemichordata
- Class: Pterobranchia
- Order: Cephalodiscida
- Family: Cephalodiscidae
- Genus: Cephalodiscus
- Species: C. kempi

Binomial name
- Cephalodiscus kempi John, 1932

Species of hemichordate

Cephalodiscus kempi is a sessile hemichordate belonging to the order Cephalodiscida.
