= Cephalodiscus densus =

Scientific classification
- Kingdom: Animalia
- Phylum: Hemichordata
- Class: Pterobranchia
- Order: Cephalodiscida
- Family: Cephalodiscidae
- Genus: Cephalodiscus
- Species: C. densus

Binomial name
- Cephalodiscus densus Andersson, 1907

Species of hemichordate

Cephalodiscus densus is a sessile hemichordate belonging to the order Cephalodiscida. The species is endemic to the Antarctic, being found in the Ross Sea and much of the Antarctic coastline, as well as near the Kerguelen Islands.

Specimens appear bush-like, with fleshy tubules approximately 1 mm in diameter wrapped in a rock shell built of cemented sediment and other foreign material. Individuals live in the upper portion of the shell, and eggs and young are stored in the lower portion, or the colony to which the base attaches. The body is roughly 6 mm long, of which the stalk composes about 4 mm. The preserved flesh appears on average orange in color, with individuals ranging from pale to dark brown.

The largest-known colony of peanut worms is a 2.5-m colony of C. densus.
