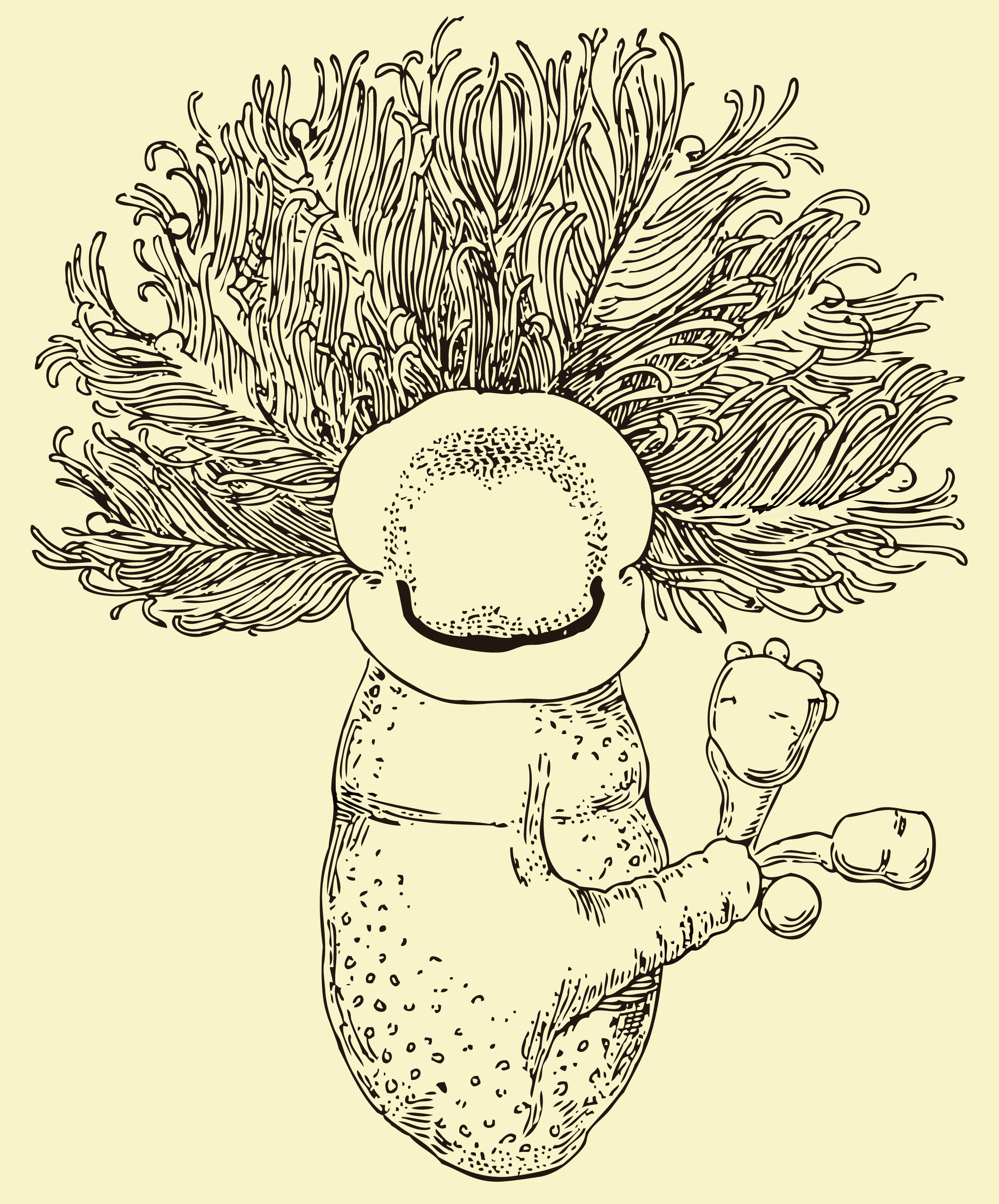
- Cephalodiscus dodecalophus

Scientific classification
- Kingdom: Animalia
- Phylum: Hemichordata
- Class: Pterobranchia
- Order: Cephalodiscida
- Family: Cephalodiscidae
- Genus: Cephalodiscus
- Species: C. dodecalophus

Binomial name
- Cephalodiscus dodecalophus M'Intosh, 1882

= Cephalodiscus dodecalophus =

Species of hemichordate

Cephalodiscus dodecalophus is a sessile hemichordate belonging to the order Cephalodiscida.

It has erect tubaria.
