= Cephalodiscus calciformis =

Scientific classification
- Kingdom: Animalia
- Phylum: Hemichordata
- Class: Pterobranchia
- Order: Cephalodiscida
- Family: Cephalodiscidae
- Genus: Cephalodiscus
- Species: C. calciformis

Binomial name
- Cephalodiscus calciformis Emig, 1977

Species of hemichordate

Cephalodiscus calciformis is a sessile hemichordate belonging to the order Cephalodiscida. It is the only pterobranch species with funnel-shaped tubaria.
