= Cephalodiscus australiensis =

Scientific classification
- Kingdom: Animalia
- Phylum: Hemichordata
- Class: Pterobranchia
- Order: Cephalodiscida
- Family: Cephalodiscidae
- Genus: Cephalodiscus
- Species: C. australiensis

Binomial name
- Cephalodiscus australiensis Johnston & Muirhead, 1951

Species of hemichordate

Cephalodiscus australiensis is a sessile hemichordate belonging to the order Cephalodiscida.
