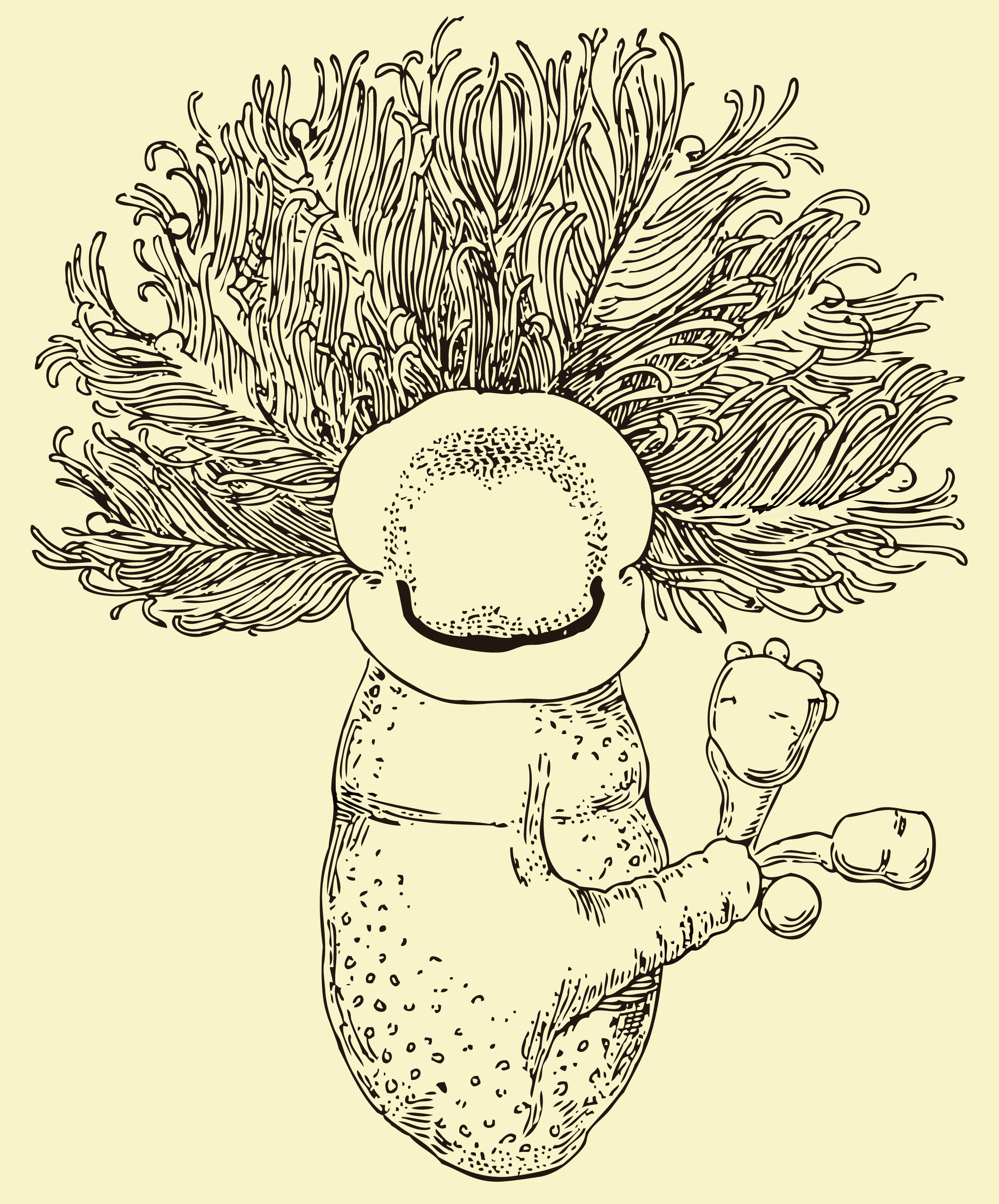
- Cephalodiscus dodecalophus
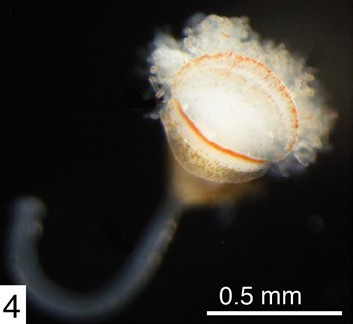
- Ventral view of a zooid of Cephalodiscus planitectus

Scientific classification
- Kingdom: Animalia
- Phylum: Hemichordata
- Class: Pterobranchia
- Order: Cephalodiscida
- Family: Cephalodiscidae
- Genus: Cephalodiscus; M'Intosh, 1882

Type species
- Cephalodiscus dodecalophus McIntosh, 1882

Species
- See text

Synonyms
- Demiothecia Ridewood, 1906; Idiothecia Ridewood, 1906; Orthoecus Andersson, 1907; Acoelothecia John, 1931

= Cephalodiscus =

Cephalodiscus Temporal range: Cambrian (Miaolingian, ?Wuliuan)–Present

Genus of hemichordates

Cephalodiscus is a genus of hemichordates in the family Cephalodiscidae of the order Cephalodiscida.

== Description ==
All known species live in a secreted coenecium attached to a rock substrate. Unlike Rhabdopleura, Cephalodiscus species do not form large colonies and are only pseudocolonial, but they do share a common area with individual buds for each zooid. Cephalodiscus zooids are also more mobile than their Rhabdopleura counterparts, and are able to move around within tubaria. Cephalodiscus zooids can be produced via asexual budding. There are a few pairs of tentacled arms, whereas Rhabdopleura has only one pair of arms.

== Species ==
19 living species of Cephalodiscus have been described:

- Cephalodiscus agglutinans Harmer & Ridewood, 1914
- Cephalodiscus atlanticus Bayer, 1962
- Cephalodiscus australiensis Johnston & Muirhead, 1951
- Cephalodiscus calciformis Emig, 1977
- Cephalodiscus densus Andersson 1907 [Cephalodiscus rarus Andersson, 1907; Cephalodiscus anderssoni Gravier 1912]
- Cephalodiscus dodecalophus McIntosh 1882
- Cephalodiscus evansi Ridewood
- Cephalodiscus fumosus John, 1932
- Cephalodiscus gilchristi Ridewood, 1908
- Cephalodiscus gracilis Harmer 1905
- Cephalodiscus graptolitoides Dilly 1993
- Cephalodiscus hodgsoni Ridewood, 1907 [Cephalodiscus aequatus Andersson 1907; Cephalodiscus inaequatus Andersson 1907]
- Cephalodiscus indicus Schepotieff 1909
- Cephalodiscus kempi John, 1932
- Cephalodiscus levinsoni Harmer 1905
- Cephalodiscus nigrescens Lankester 1905
- Cephalodiscus planitectus Miyamoto, Nishikawa and Namikawa, 2020
- Cephalodiscus sibogae Harmer 1905
- Cephalodiscus solidus Andersson, 1907

Extinct species include:

- †Cephalodiscus lutetianus Abrard, Dollfus & Soyer 1950
- †Cephalodiscus nusplingensis Schweigert & Dietl 2013

Proposed subgenera are Idiothecia, Demiothecia, Orthoecus, and Acoelothecia.

== Historical discovery ==
Cephalodiscus are endemic to the Antarctic and Southern Ocean, whose relative inaccessibility has historically limited human study of the genus. The Erebus and Terror may have unwittingly encountered C. nigrescens specimens, and the Challenger C. densus; but until the Swedish Antarctic Expedition of 1901-1903, only C. dodecalphus had been identified. In 1882, William M'Intosh (later spelled McIntosh) had identified Dodecalphus from dredged Magellanic-Straits material, work published 5 years later, but the discovery left cephalodiscid phylogeny unclear. M'Intosh proposed placement amongst the polyzoa, whilst Harmer suggested the modern placement amongst hemichordates. The Swedish expedition provided a plethora of new species, and subsequent researchers began to recognize cephalodiscid species in the relatively temperate waters off South Africa, the Falklands, Sri Lanka, and Australia. At the same time, researchers also determined that C. rarus and andersonii were in fact C. densus specimens.

Cephalodiscus planitectus is the most recently discovered species. It was described in 2020 from specimens found in Sagami Bay off the southern coast of Honshu, Japan.
