= Rotaciurca =

Rotaciurca Temporal range: Late Silurian, 420 Ma

Scientific classification
- Kingdom: Animalia
- Phylum: Hemichordata
- Class: Pterobranchia
- Order: Cephalodiscida
- Family: †Rotaciurcidae; Briggs & Mongiardino Koch, 2023
- Genus: †Rotaciurca; Briggs & Mongiardino Koch, 2023
- Species: †R. superbus

Binomial name
- †Rotaciurca superbus Briggs & Mongiardino Koch, 2023

Extinct genus of pterobranch

Rotaciurca is an extinct genus of Silurian cephalodiscid pterobranchs. The genus contains a single species, Rotaciurca superbus, known from the Bertie Group of Ontario, Canada.

== Description ==
Rotaciurca is a pseudocolonial (containing multiple clustered individuals which are not connected) pterobranch, unique for being a cephalodiscid rather than a graptolite. The cluster consists of a ring of radiating tubes, likely containing the living individuals, attached to a conical structure interpreted as a float, giving the original fossil the nickname of "Ezekiel's wheel". The whole organism is roughly 4 cm (1.6 in) long, seemingly with two distinct rows of tubes. Its pterobranch affinity is confirmed by lineations within the tubes, which are traces of fuselli, and the irregular arrangement of these group it with the cephalodiscids. Rotaciurca has a number of similarities to Yuknessia, another enigmatic fossil recently described as a pterobranch, including rigid and similarly sized tubes, although those of Yuknessia are much finer and have more tightly packed fuselli.

Despite this, a 2024 paper disagreed with the pterobranch affinity of Rotaciurca, as its “segments” show a central rib that seems to be at odds with being pterobranch fuselli. While its circular shape is similar to paropsonemids from the Devonian of New York, the paper recommended leaving the genus unassigned to any higher taxon until more evidence relating to its construction or phylogenetic relationships was found.

== Ecology ==
Rotaciurca has been interpreted as a planktonic filter-feeder, with the conical float providing buoyancy like that of a Portuguese man o' war. It is unique in this aspect, as all other known cephalodiscids are benthic and sessile, while the only other planktonic pterobranchs are graptolites, which shows the water column was colonised several times by hemichordates.

== Distribution ==
Rotaciurca is known from ten specimens, with the holotype nearly complete. Unusually for a planktonic animal, it has only been found in one locality, that being the Bertie Group, however since it was likely soft-bodied, the exceptional preservation of this site may have been necessary for Rotaciurca to fossilise.

== Etymology ==
Rotaciurca is named in honour of Samuel J. Ciurca, Jr., who donated thousands of eurypterid fossils to the Yale Peabody Museum, alongside the Latin word rota, meaning "wheel". Its specific name, superbus, from the Latin word meaning "beautiful", acknowledges that Ciurca labelled the holotype fossil "the most beautiful fossil ever found".
