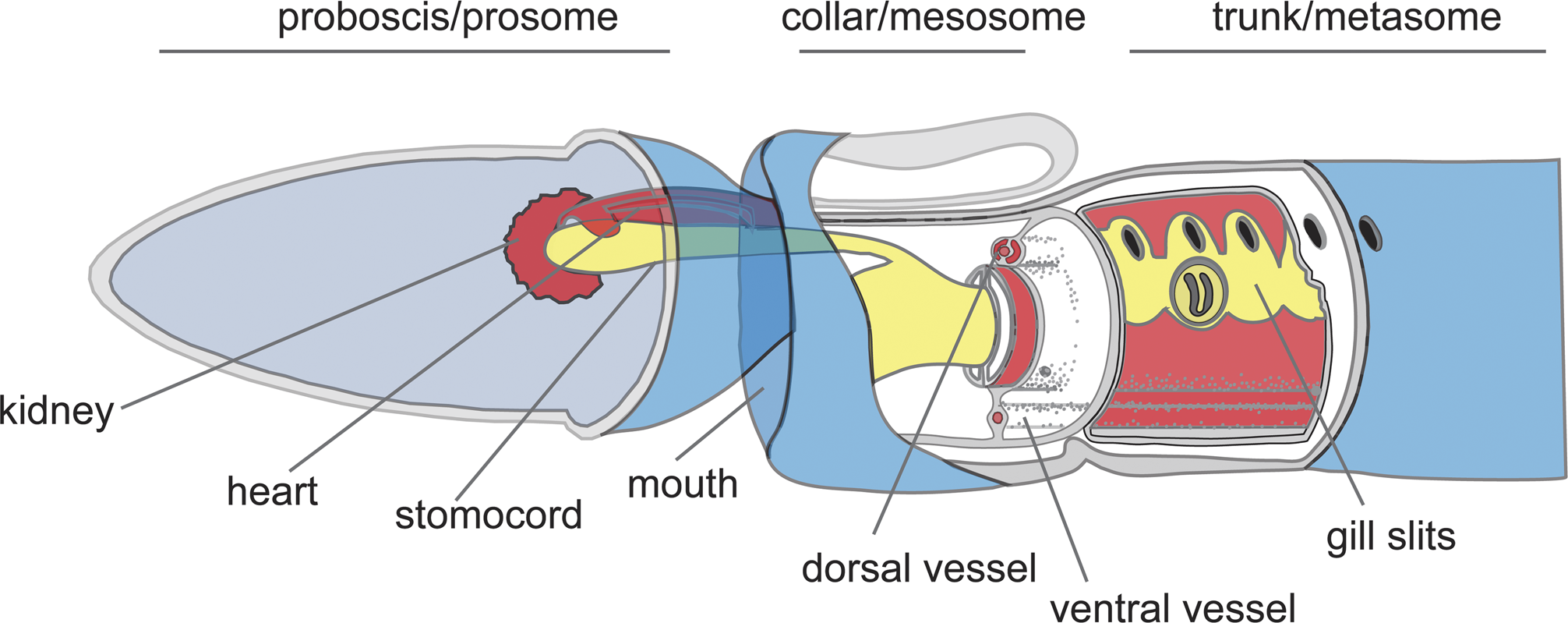

Scientific classification
- Kingdom: Animalia
- Phylum: Hemichordata
- Class: Enteropneusta
- Family: Harrimaniidae
- Genus: Saccoglossus; Schimkewitsch, 1892

Species
- See text

= Saccoglossus =

Genus of marine worm-like animals

Saccoglossus is a genus of acorn worm. It is the largest genus in the Enteropneusta class, with 20 species.

This genus is characterized especially by the concentric rings of muscle fibers in the proboscis. Many Saccoglossus can be found in coastal mud and sand habitat, often near bays. They dig tubes in the substrate, ejecting conical piles of castings in a spiral fashion.

Acorn worms of this genus are known for the production and accumulation of various halogenated phenols and pyrroles.

== Species ==
The follow species are recognized in this genus:

- Saccoglossus apantesis Thomas, 1956
- Saccoglossus apatensis Thomas, 1955
- Saccoglossus aulakoeis Thomas, 1968
- Saccoglossus bromophenolosus King, Giray & Kornfield, 1994
- Saccoglossus horsti Brambell & Goodhart, 1941
- Saccoglossus hwangtauensis (Tchang & Koo, 1935)
- Saccoglossus inhacensis Kapelus, 1936
- Saccoglossus kowalevskii (Agassiz, 1873)
- Saccoglossus madrasensis Rao, 1957
- Saccoglossus mereschkowskii (Wagner, 1885)
- Saccoglossus otagoensis (Benham, 1899)
- Saccoglossus palmeri Cameron, Deland & Bullock, 2010
- Saccoglossus porochordus Cameron, Deland & Bullock, 2010
- Saccoglossus pusillus (Ritter, 1902)
- Saccoglossus rhabdorhyncus Cameron, Deland & Bullock, 2010
- Saccoglossus ruber (Tattersall, 1905)
- Saccoglossus shumaginensis Cameron, Deland & Bullock, 2010
- Saccoglossus sonorensis Cameron, Deland & Bullock, 2010
- Saccoglossus sulcatus (Spengel, 1893)
- Saccoglossus testa Cameron, 201
