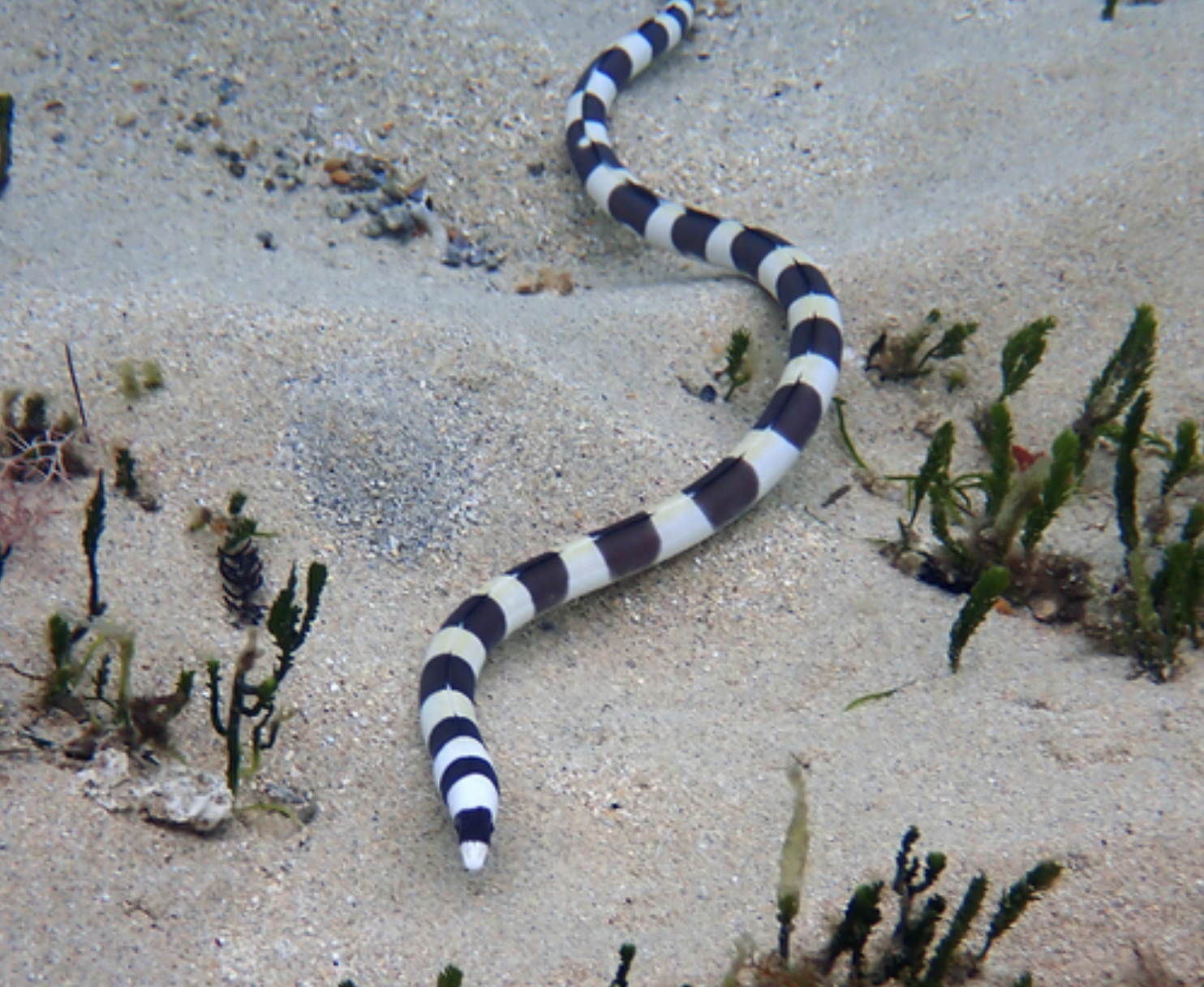
- Individual seen on Norfolk Island

Conservation status
- Least Concern (IUCN 3.1)

Scientific classification
- Kingdom: Animalia
- Phylum: Chordata
- Class: Actinopterygii
- Order: Anguilliformes
- Family: Ophichthidae
- Genus: Leiuranus
- Species: L. semicinctus

Binomial name
- Leiuranus semicinctus (Lay & Bennett, 1839)

Synonyms
- Ophisurus semicinctus Lay & Bennett, 1839; Liuranus semicinctus (Lay & Bennett, 1839); Sphagebranchus cinctus Tanaka, 1908; Caecula cincta (Tanaka, 1908); Machaerenchelys vanderbilti Fowler, 1938; Machaerenchelys phoenixensis Schultz, 1943; Leiuranus phoenixensis (Schultz, 1943)

= Saddled snake-eel =

Species of fish

The saddled snake-eel (Leiuranus semicinctus), also known commonly as the halfbanded snake-eel, the banded snake eel, or the culverin, is an eel in the family Ophichthidae (worm/snake eels). It was described by George Tradescant Lay and Edward Turner Bennett in 1839, originally under the genus Ophisurus. It is a marine, tropical eel which is known from the Indo-Pacific and southeastern Atlantic Ocean, including East and South Africa, the Hawaiian Islands, the Marquesan Islands, the Mangaréva islands, Japan, and Australia. It dwells at a depth range of 0 to 70 metres (0 to 230 ft), most often around 0 to 10 metres (0 to 33 ft), and inhabits lagoons and reefs, in which it forms burrows in beds of seagrass and sandy areas. Males can reach a maximum total length of 66 centimetres (2.17 ft).

The saddled snake-eel's diet consists of fish, crabs, prawns, and worms including Ptychodera. Males and females rise to the surface of the water during spawning.
