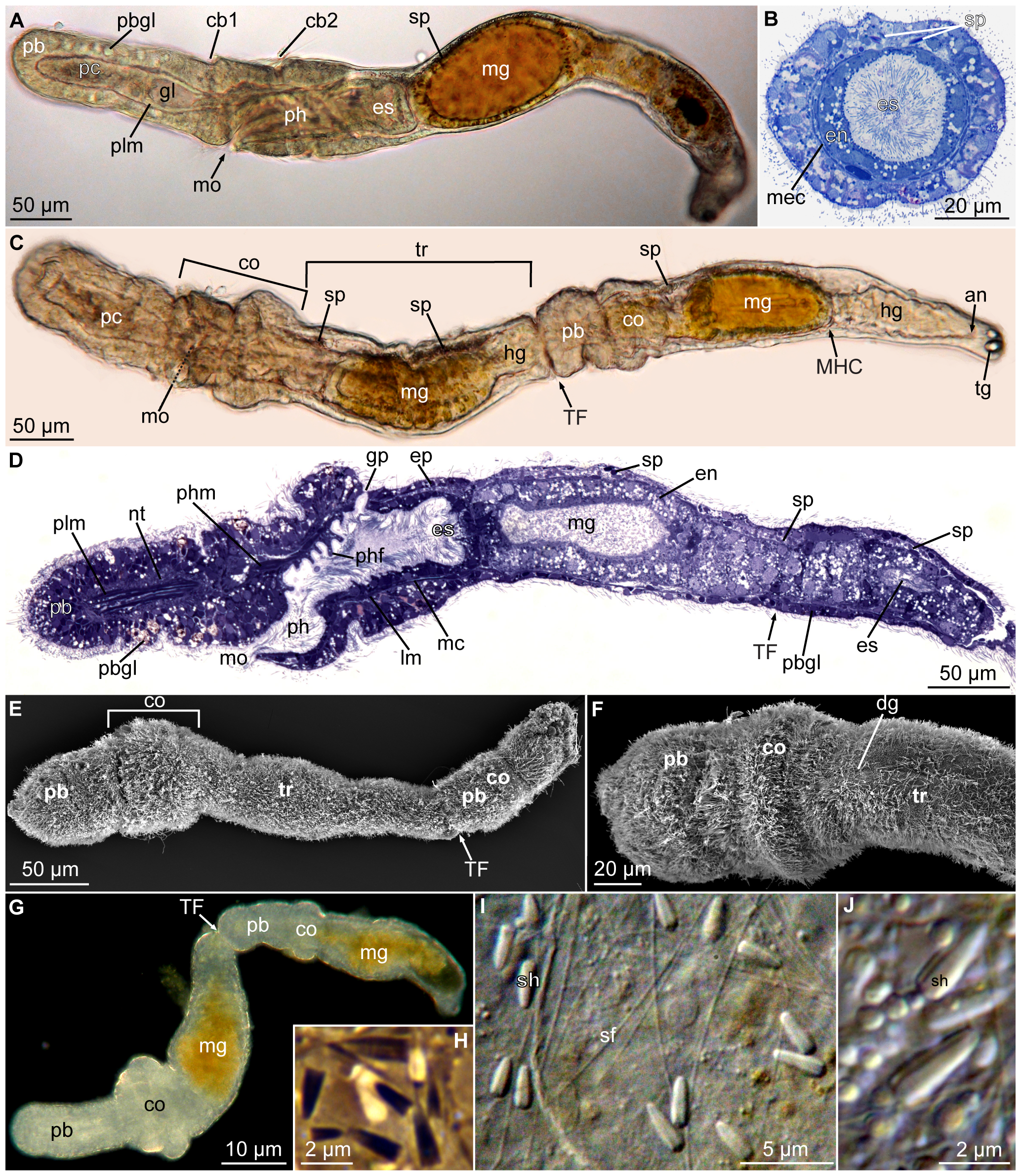
- Microscopic views of M. psammophilus

Scientific classification
- Kingdom: Animalia
- Phylum: Hemichordata
- Class: Enteropneusta
- Family: Harrimaniidae
- Genus: Meioglossus
- Species: M. psammophilus

Binomial name
- Meioglossus psammophilus Worsaae, Sterrer, Kaul-Strehlow, Hay-Schmidt & Giribet, 2012

= Meioglossus =

Genus of marine worm-like animals

Meioglossus psammophilus under the microscope

Meioglossus psammophilus is a species of acorn worm in the family Harrimaniidae, the only known species of the genus Meigolossus. It inhabits the Western Caribbean and Bermuda. The name of the species derives from two Greek words; psammon and philos which in translation means friend of the sands in reference to adult stage of species' lifestyle. The length of the species is 0.6 millimetres (0.024 in). It is able to reproduce asexually through paratomy.
