= Cambrobranchus =

Cambrobranchus Temporal range: early Cambrian

Scientific classification
- Kingdom: Animalia
- Phylum: Hemichordata
- Class: Enteropneusta
- Genus: †Cambrobranchus; Yang, Kimmig, Cameron, Nanglu, Kimmig, de Carle, Zhang, Yu & Peng, 2024
- Species: †C. pelagobenthos

Binomial name
- †Cambrobranchus pelagobenthos Yang, Kimmig, Cameron, Nanglu, Kimmig, de Carle, Zhang, Yu & Peng, 2024

Extinct genus of acorn worms

Cambrobranchus is an extinct genus of acorn worm
