= Bromophenol =

Chemical structure of 2-bromophenol

A bromophenol is an organic compound consisting of hydroxyl groups and bromine atoms bonded to a benzene ring. They may be viewed as hydroxyl derivatives of bromobenzene, or as brominated derivatives of phenol. There are five basic types of bromophenols (mono- to pentabromophenol) and 19 different bromophenols in total when positional isomerism is taken into account. Bromophenols are produced by electrophilic halogenation of phenol with bromine.

== List of bromophenols ==
There is a total of 19 bromophenols, corresponding to the different ways in which bromine atoms can be attached to the five carbon atoms in the benzene ring of the phenol molecule, excluding the carbon atom to which the hydroxy group is attached.

Monobromrophenols have three isomers because there is only one bromine atom that can occupy one of three ring positions on the phenol molecule; 2-bromophenol, for example, is the isomer that has a bromine atom in the ortho position. Pentabromophenol, by contrast, has only one isomer because all five available ring positions on the phenol are fully brominated.

- Monobromophenol (3 positional isomers)
  - 2-Bromophenol
  - 3-Bromophenol
  - 4-Bromophenol
- Dibromophenol (6 positional isomers)
  - 2,3-Dibromophenol
  - 2,4-Dibromophenol
  - 2,5-Dibromophenol
  - 2,6-Dibromophenol
  - 3,4-Dibromophenol
  - 3,5-Dibromophenol
- Tribromophenol (6 positional isomers)
  - 2,3,4-Tribromophenol
  - 2,3,5-Tribromophenol
  - 2,3,6-Tribromophenol
  - 2,4,5-Tribromophenol
  - 2,4,6-Tribromophenol
  - 3,4,5-Tribromophenol
- Tetrabromophenol (3 positional isomers)
  - 2,3,4,5-Tetrabromophenol
  - 2,3,4,6-Tetrabromophenol
  - 2,3,5,6-Tetrabromophenol
- Pentabromophenol (1 positional isomer)

== Health Concerns ==
A series of studies have shown that bromophenols derived from brominated flame retardants (BFRs) in human environments are present in human blood and breast milk. Bromophenols (as well as PBDEs) were detected in 88% of samples, with 2,4,6-Tribromophenol present in 84% of breast milk samples alone. This was widely reported and has raised questions about restricting the use of brominated flame retardants in the future.

== See also ==
- Chlorophenol
- Iodophenol
