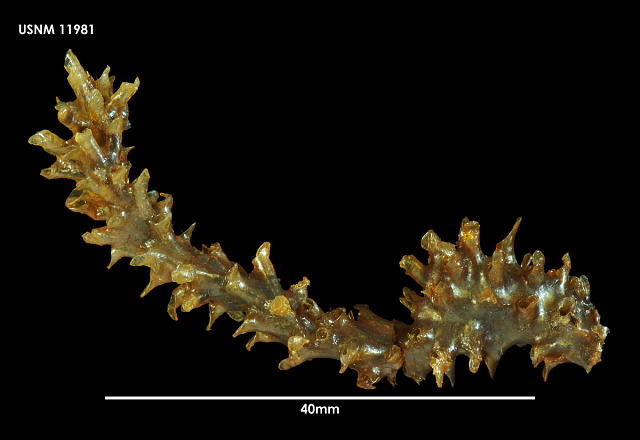

Scientific classification
- Kingdom: Animalia
- Phylum: Hemichordata
- Class: Pterobranchia
- Order: Cephalodiscida
- Family: Cephalodiscidae
- Genus: Cephalodiscus
- Species: C. nigrescens

Binomial name
- Cephalodiscus nigrescens Lankester, 1905

= Cephalodiscus nigrescens =

Species of hemichordate

Cephalodiscus nigrescens is a sessile hemichordate belonging to the order Cephalodiscida.

== Parasites ==
The parasitic protozoan Neurosporidium cephalodisci has been found in the nervous system of Cephalodiscus nigrescens.
