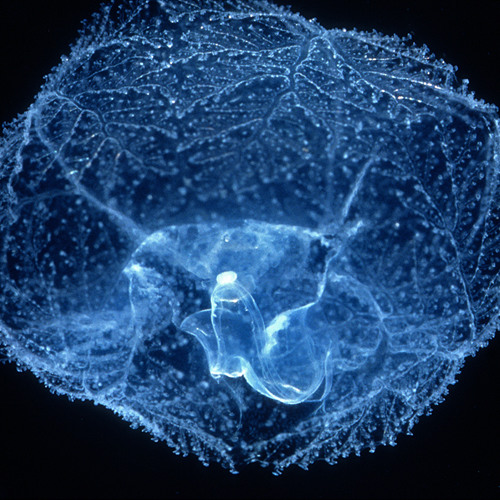

Scientific classification
- Kingdom: Animalia
- Phylum: Hemichordata
- Class: Planctosphaeroidea; Spengel, 1932
- Genus: Planctosphaera; Spengel, 1932
- Species: P. pelagica

Binomial name
- Planctosphaera pelagica Spengel, 1932

= Planctosphaera =

Genus of hemichordates

Planctosphaera pelagica is a hemichordate and the only known representative of the class Planctosphaeroidea.

The species is known only by its free swimming larvae. The larvae are tornaria larvae similar to those of the closely related Enteropneusta, which possess a ciliated band to capture food particles. Planctosphaera pelagica is unique in possessing mucus-secreting glands around the ciliated band. Possible uses of the mucous glands include assisting in feeding or deterring predators and parasites. Planctosphaera pelagica larvae are also larger than enteropneust larvae; due to the size difference and presence of mucous glands, they are usually given their own class.
