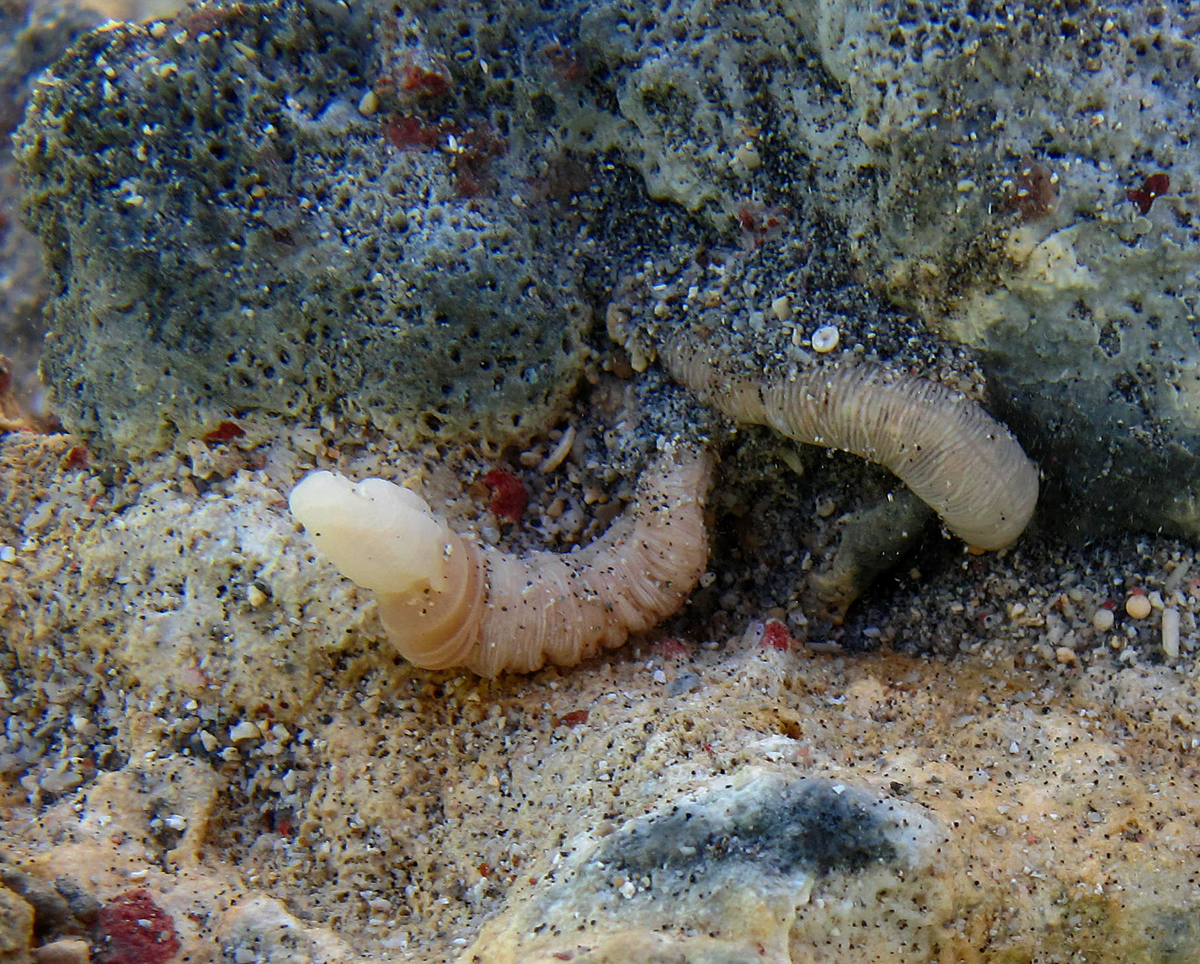

Scientific classification
- Kingdom: Animalia
- Phylum: Hemichordata
- Class: Enteropneusta
- Family: Ptychoderidae
- Genus: Glossobalanus; Spengel, 1901

= Glossobalanus =

Genus of acorn worms

Glossobalanus is a genus of worms belonging to the family Ptychoderidae.

== Distribution ==
The genus has almost cosmopolitan distribution, with species found in North and South American, Europe, Asia, Africa and Oceania.

== Species ==
Species:

- Glossobalanus alatus Horst, 1940
- Glossobalanus barnharti Cameron & Ostiguy, 2013
- Glossobalanus berkeleyi Willey, 1931
- Glossobalanus polybranchioporus Tchang & Liang, 1965
- Glossobalanus mortenseni van der Horst, 1932
- Glossobalanus weii Fu & Guo & Ding & Zhou & Wei, 2024
- Glossobalanus marginatus Meek, 1922
- Glossobalanus crozieri van der Horst, 1924
- Glossobalanus elongatus Spengel, 1904
- Glossobalanus hartmanae Cameron & Ostiguy, 2013
- Glossobalanus hedleyi Hill, 1897
- Glossobalanus indicus Rao, 1955
- Glossobalanus minutus Kowalevsky, 1866
- Glossobalanus parvulus Punnett, 1906
- Glossobalanus ruficollis Willey, 1899
- Glossobalanus sarniensis Koehler, 1886
- Glossobalanus williami Cameron & Ostiguy, 2013
