= Harrimaniidae =

- Meioglossus

Scientific classification
- Kingdom: Animalia
- Phylum: Hemichordata
- Class: Enteropneusta
- Family: Harrimaniidae van der Horst, 1935

Genera
- Harrimania Ritter, 1900; Horstia Deland, Cameron, Rao, Ritter & Bullock, 2010; Meioglossus Worsaae, Sterrer, Kaul-Strehlow, Hay-Schmidt & Giribet, 2012; Mesoglossus Deland, Cameron, Rao, Ritter & Bullock, 2010; Protoglossus van der Horst, 1935; Ritteria Deland, Cameron, Rao, Ritter & Bullock, 2010; Saccoglossus Schimkewitsch, 1892; Saxipendium Woodwick & Sensenbaugh, 1985; Stereobalanus Spengel, 1901; Xenopleura Gilchrist, 1925

Synonyms
- Saxipendiidae

Family of marine worm-like animals

Harrimaniidae is a basal family of acorn worms. A taxonomic revision was undertaken in 2010, and a number of new genera and species found in the Eastern Pacific were described. In this family the development is direct without tornaria larva, and circular muscle fibers in their trunk is missing. There is some indication that Stereobalanus may be a separate basal acorn worm lineage, sister to all remaining acorn worms.

== Species ==
The following genera and species are listed in the World Register of Marine Species:

- Harrimania Ritter, 1900
  - Harrimania kupfferi (von Willemoes-Suhm, 1871)
  - Harrimania maculosa Ritter, 1900
  - Harrimania planktophilus Cameron, 2002
- Horstia Deland, Cameron, Rao, Ritter & Bullock, 2010
  - Horstia kincaidi Deland, Cameron, Rao, Ritter & Bullock, 2010
- Meioglossus Worsaae, Sterrer, Kaul-Strehlow, Hay-Schmidt & Giribet, 2012
  - Meioglossus psammophilus Worsaae, Sterrer, Kaul-Strehlow, Hay-Schmidt & Giribet, 2012
- Mesoglossus Deland, Cameron, Rao, Ritter & Bullock, 2010
  - Mesoglossus bournei (Menon, 1904)
  - Mesoglossus caraibicus (van der Horst, 1924)
  - Mesoglossus gurneyi (Robinson, 1927)
  - Mesoglossus intermedius Deland, Cameron, Rao, Ritter & Bullock, 2010
  - Mesoglossus macginitiei Deland, Cameron, Rao, Ritter & Bullock, 2010
  - Mesoglossus pygmaeus (Hinrichs & Jacobi, 1938)
- Protoglossus van der Horst, 1935
  - Protoglossus graveolens Giray and King, 1996
  - Protoglossus koehleri (Caullery and Mesnil, 1900)
  - Protoglossus taeniatum author unknown
- Ritteria Deland, Cameron, Rao, Ritter & Bullock, 2010
  - Ritteria ambigua Deland, Cameron, Rao, Ritter & Bullock, 2010
- Saccoglossus Schimkewitsch, 1892
  - Saccoglossus apatensis Thomas, 1956
  - Saccoglossus aulakoeis Thomas, 1968
  - Saccoglossus borealis Okuda & Yamada, 1955
  - Saccoglossus bournei (Menon, 1904)
  - Saccoglossus bromophenolosus King, Giray and Kornfield, 1994
  - Saccoglossus caraibicus (van der Horst, 1924)
  - Saccoglossus gurneyi (Robinson, 1927)
  - Saccoglossus horsti Brambell and Goodhart, 1941
  - Saccoglossus hwangtauensis Si & Kwang-Chung, 1935
  - Saccoglossus inhacensis van der Horst, 1934
  - Saccoglossus kowalevskii (Agassiz, 1873)
  - Saccoglossus madrasensis Rao, 1957
  - Saccoglossus mereschkowskii (Wagner, 1885)
  - Saccoglossus otagoensis (Benham, 1899)
  - Saccoglossus pusillus (Ritter, 1902)
  - Saccoglossus pygmaeus Hinrichs and Jacobi, 1938
  - Saccoglossus ruber Tattersall, 1905
  - Saccoglossus sulcatus (Spengel, 1893)
- Stereobalanus Spengel, 1901
  - Stereobalanus canadensis (Spengel, 1893)
  - Stereobalanus willeyi Ritter, 1904
- Xenopleura Gilchrist, 1925
  - Xenopleura vivipara Gilchrist, 1925
