= 2,4-Dibromophenol =

Names
- Preferred IUPAC name 2,4-Dibromophenol

Identifiers
CAS Number	615-58-7
3D model (JSmol)	Interactive image
ChEBI	CHEBI:34238
ChEMBL	ChEMBL186858
ChemSpider	11510
ECHA InfoCard	100.009.488
EC Number	210-446-5
PubChem CID	12005
UNII	IA75T5C9TG
CompTox Dashboard (EPA)	DTXSID1052290
- InChI: InChI=1S/C6H4Br2O/c7-4-1-2-6(9)5(8)3-4/h1-3,9H Key: FAXWFCTVSHEODL-UHFFFAOYSA-N
- SMILES: c1cc(c(cc1Br)Br)O

Properties
Chemical formula	C_{6}H_{4}Br_{2}O
Molar mass	251.905 g·mol^{−1}
Melting point	38 °C (100 °F; 311 K)
Boiling point	238.5 °C (461.3 °F; 511.6 K)

Hazards
- GHS labelling
Pictograms	(GHS06: Toxic) (GHS07: Exclamation mark)
Signal word	Danger
Hazard statements	H300, H315, H319, H335, H412
Precautionary statements	P261, P264, P270, P271, P273, P280, P301+P310, P302+P352, P304+P340, P305+P351+P338, P312, P321, P330, P332+P313, P337+P313, P362, P403+P233, P405, P501
- Except where otherwise noted, data are given for materials in their standard state (at 25 °C [77 °F], 100 kPa). Infobox references

2,4-Dibromophenol is an isomer of dibromophenol with the molecular formula C_{6}H_{4}Br_{2}O.

== Properties ==
At room temperature, 2,4-dibromophenol is a solid with needle-like crystals. It melts at 38 °C (100.4 °F) and boils at 238.5 °C (461.3 °F). it has a molecular weight of 251.905 g/mol. It is soluble in water, ethanol, ether and benzene and slightly soluble in carbon tetrachloride.

== Occurrence ==
2,4-Dibromophenol is found in certain molluscs and crustaceans, as well as the acorn worm Saccoglossus bromophenolosus, which is named after it.
