= Convict snake eel =

Conservation status
- Least Concern (IUCN 3.1)

Scientific classification
- Kingdom: Animalia
- Phylum: Chordata
- Class: Actinopterygii
- Order: Anguilliformes
- Family: Ophichthidae
- Genus: Leiuranus
- Species: L. versicolor

Binomial name
- Leiuranus versicolor (Richardson, 1848)

Synonyms
- Ophisurus versicolor Richardson, 1848; Cyclophichthys versicolor (Richardson, 1848); Elapsopis versicolor (Richardson, 1848); Elapsopsis versicolor (Richardson, 1848); Ophichthus cyclorhinus Fraser-Brunner, 1934; Cyclophichthys cyclorhinus (Fraser-Brunner, 1934); Elapsopis cyclorhinus (Fraser-Brunner, 1934)

Species of fish

The Convict snake eel (Leiuranus versicolor) is an eel in the family Ophichthidae (worm/snake eels). It was described by John Richardson in 1848. It is a tropical, marine eel which is known from the Pacific Ocean, including Palau, Australia, Papua New Guinea, and Norfolk Island. It dwells at a depth range of 3–18 m (10–59 ft), and forms burrows in the soft bottoms of inshore regions. Males can reach a maximum total length of 75.4 cm (29.7 in).
