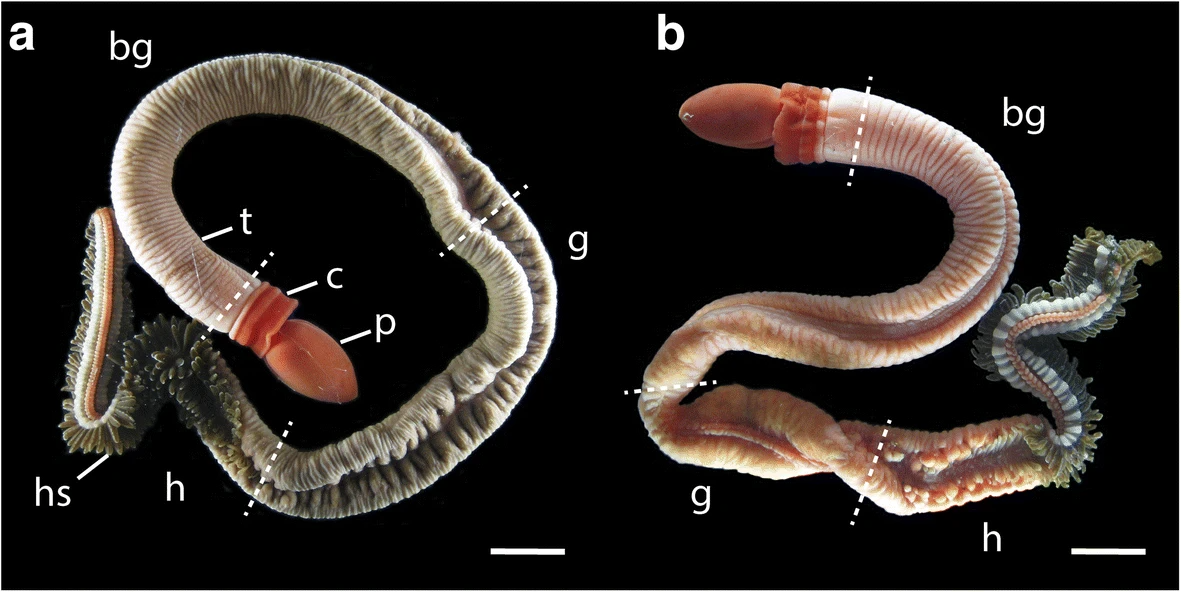
- Adult Schizocardium californicum. (a) Female. (b) Male

Scientific classification
- Kingdom: Animalia
- Phylum: Hemichordata
- Class: Enteropneusta
- Family: Spengelidae

Synonyms
- Spengeliidae

= Spengelidae =

Spengelidae Temporal range: Pennsylvanian–Present

Family of acorn worms

Spengelidae is a family of worms belonging to the class Enteropneusta, order unknown. The larvae of one of its species, Schizocardium californicum, are known for not expressing Hox genes.

Genera:

- Glandiceps Spengel, 1891
- †Mazoglossus Bardack, 1997
- Schizocardium Spengel, 1893
- Spengelia Willey, 1898
- Willeyia Punnett, 1903
