= Stereobalanus =

Scientific classification
- Kingdom: Animalia
- Phylum: Hemichordata
- Class: Enteropneusta
- Family: Harrimaniidae
- Genus: Stereobalanus; Spengel, 1901

Genus of worms

Stereobalanus is a genus of acorn worms belonging to the family Harrimaniidae.

The species of this genus are found in Europe and Northern America.

Species:

- Stereobalanus canadensis (Spengel, 1893)
- Stereobalanus willeyi Deland, Cameron, Rao, Ritter & Bullock, 2010
