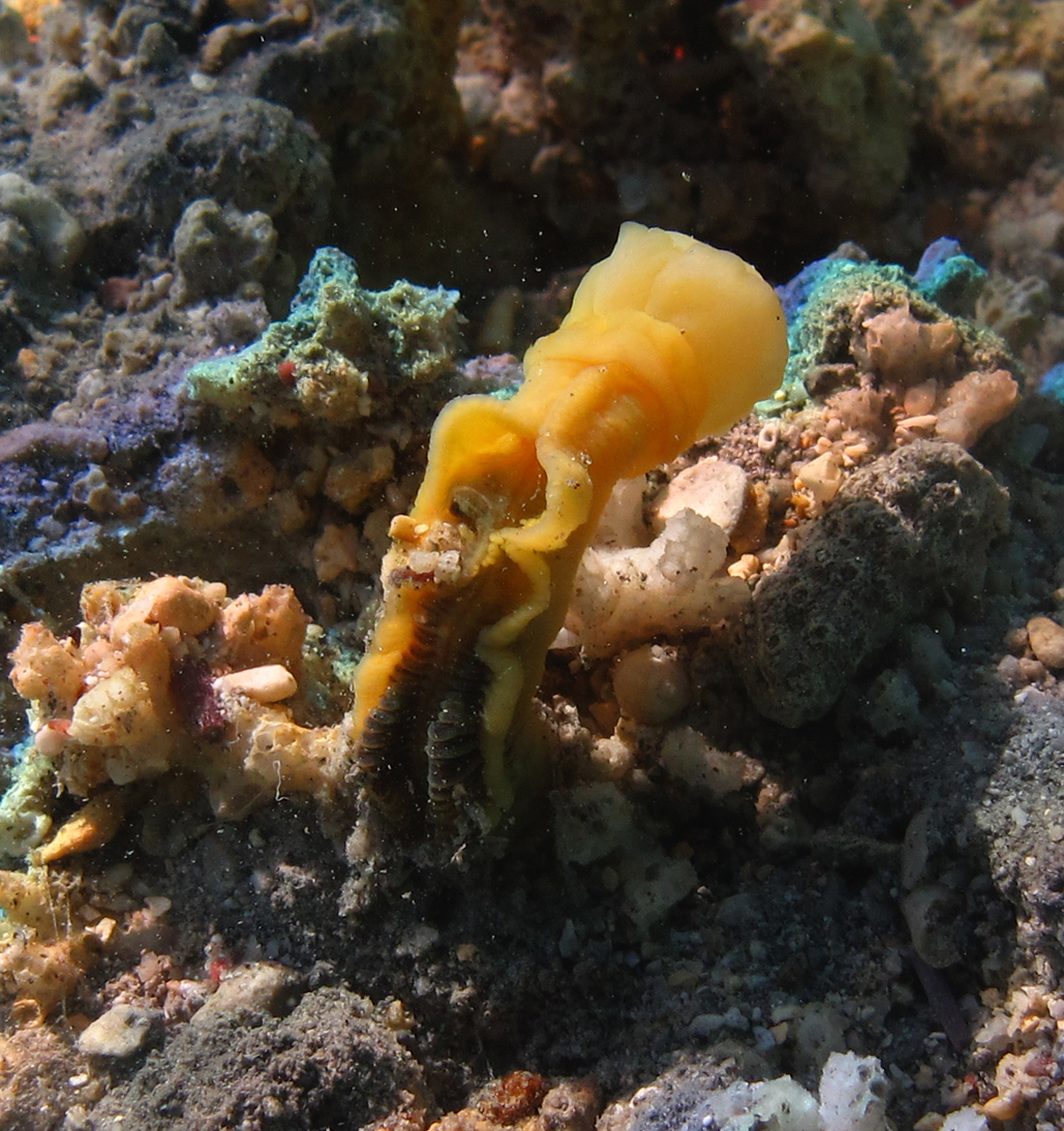
- Unidentified specimen from Réunion

Scientific classification
- Kingdom: Animalia
- Phylum: Hemichordata
- Class: Enteropneusta
- Family: Ptychoderidae
- Genus: Balanoglossus; Delle Chiaje, 1829

Species
- See text.

= Balanoglossus =

Genus of marine worm-like animals

Balanoglossus is a genus of ocean-dwelling acorn worms. It has zoological importance because, being hemichordates, they are an "evolutionary link" between invertebrates and vertebrates. Balanoglossus specimens are deuterostomes, and resemble the chordates in that they possess branchial openings.

Their heads are between 2.5 mm (1/10 in) and 5 mm (1/5 in) wide.

== Discovery ==
Johann Friedrich von Eschscholtz discovered Balanoglossus in 1825 on Mashail Island, and described it as a worm-like holothurian. The discovery of gill slits in these animals by Alexander Kovalevsky (1865) led to the creation of the class Enteropneusta by Carl Gegenbaur (1870).

== Classification ==
William Bateson (1885) originally included them in phylum Chordata. Hyman (1959), however, placed them near Echinodermata and gave Hemichordata a status of an independent phylum.

== Habitat ==
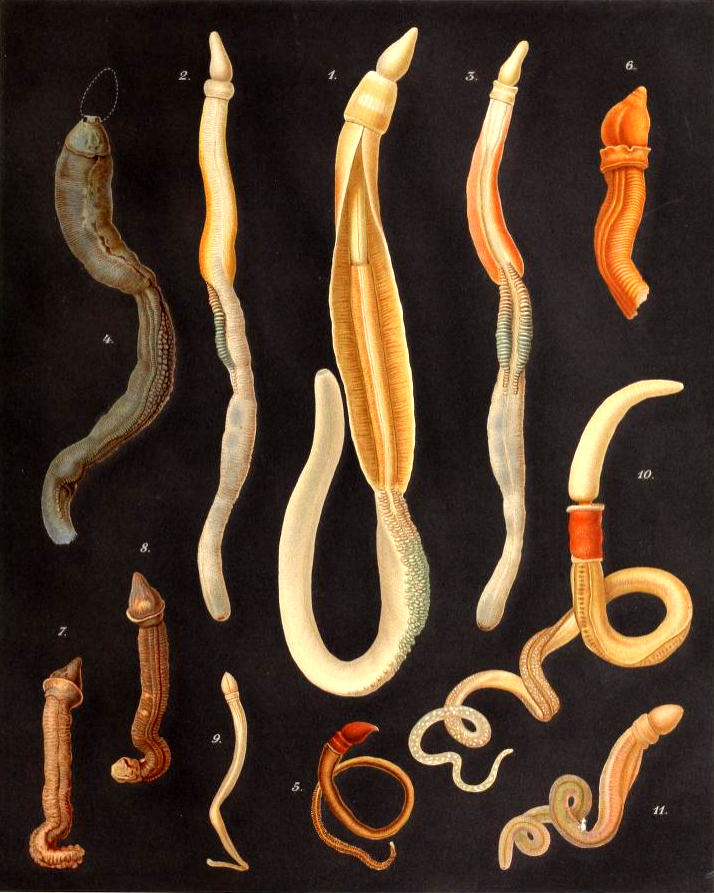
Acorn worms. Specimens 10 and 11 are Balanoglossus.

Balanoglossus are burrowing, exclusively marine animals. They are found in shallow waters between tide marks along the coast of warm and temperate oceans.

== Species ==
The World Register of Marine Species lists the following species:

- Balanoglossus apertus Spengel, 1893
- Balanoglossus aurantiaca Girard, 1853
- Balanoglossus australiensis Hill, 1894
- Balanoglossus biminiensis Willey, 1899
- Balanoglossus borealis Willey, 1899
- Balanoglossus capensis Gilchrist, 1908
- Balanoglossus carnosus Willey, 1899
- Balanoglossus clavigerus Delle Chiaje, 1829
- Balanoglossus gigas Müller in Spengel, 1893
- Balanoglossus hydrocephalus van der Horst, 1940
- Balanoglossus jamaicensis Willey, 1899
- Balanoglossus misakiensis Kuwano, 1902
- Balanoglossus natalensis Gilchrist, 1908
- Balanoglossus numeensis Maser, 1913
- Balanoglossus occidentalis Ritter, 1902
- Balanoglossus parvulus Punnett, 1903
- Balanoglossus proterogonius Belichov, 1928
- Balanoglossus robinii Giard, 1882
- Balanoglossus salmoneus Belichov, 1928
- Balanoglossus simodensis Miyamoto & Saito, 2007
- Balanoglossus stephensoni van der Horst, 1937
- Balanoglossus studiosorum van der Horst, 1940
