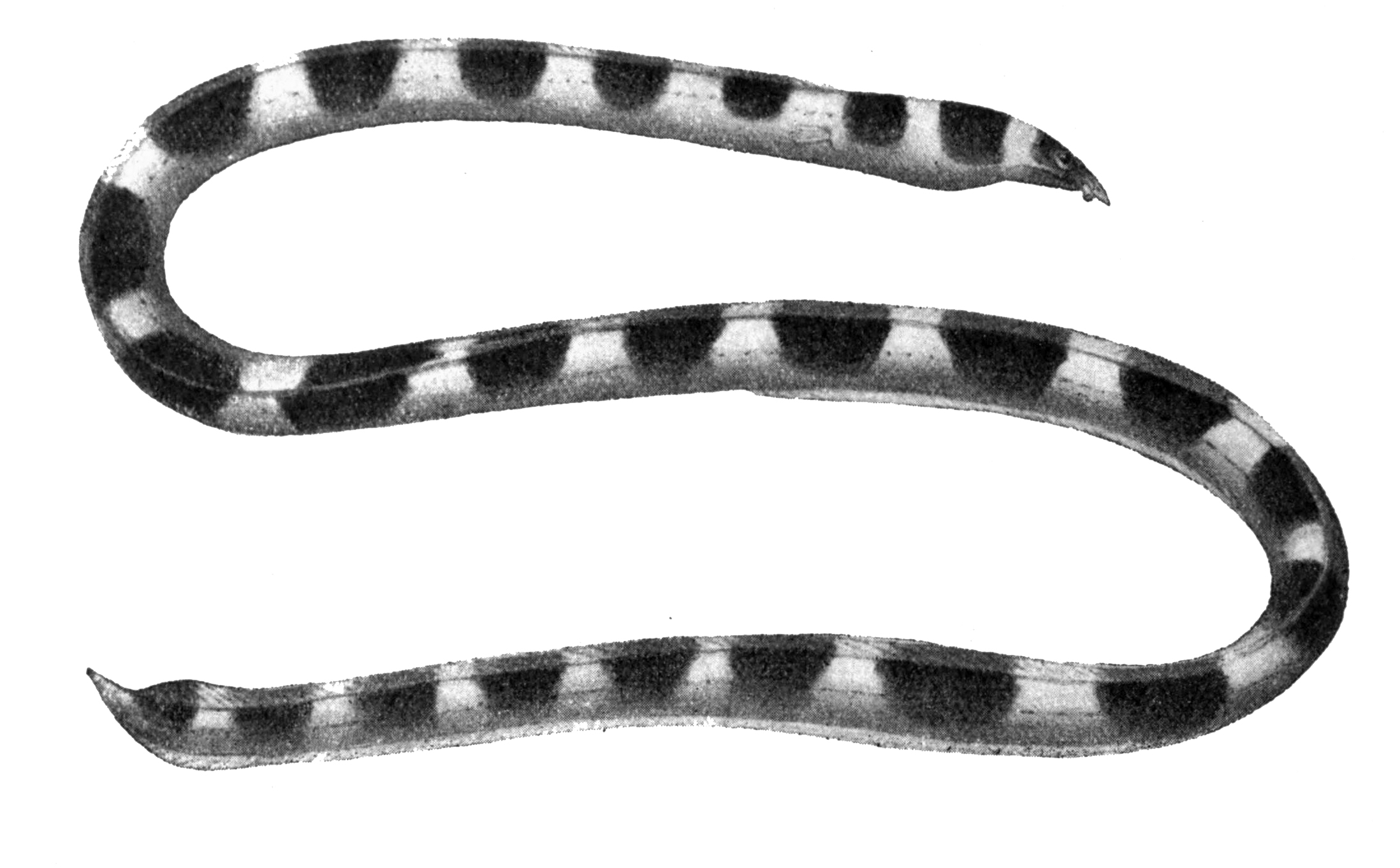
- Leiuranus semicinctus

Scientific classification
- Kingdom: Animalia
- Phylum: Chordata
- Class: Actinopterygii
- Order: Anguilliformes
- Family: Ophichthidae
- Subfamily: Ophichthinae
- Genus: Leiuranus; Bleeker, 1853

Type species
- Leiuranus lacepedii Bleeker, 1852

Species
- See text

Synonyms
- Cyclophichthys Whitley, 1951; Elapsopis Kaup, 1856; Machaerenchelys Fowler, 1938; Stethopterus Bleeker, 1852

= Leiuranus =

Genus of fishes

Leiuranus is a genus of eels in the snake eel family Ophichthidae. It currently contains the following species:

- Leiuranus semicinctus (Lay & E. T. Bennett, 1839) (Saddled snake-eel)
- Leiuranus versicolor (J. Richardson, 1848) (Convict snake-eel)
