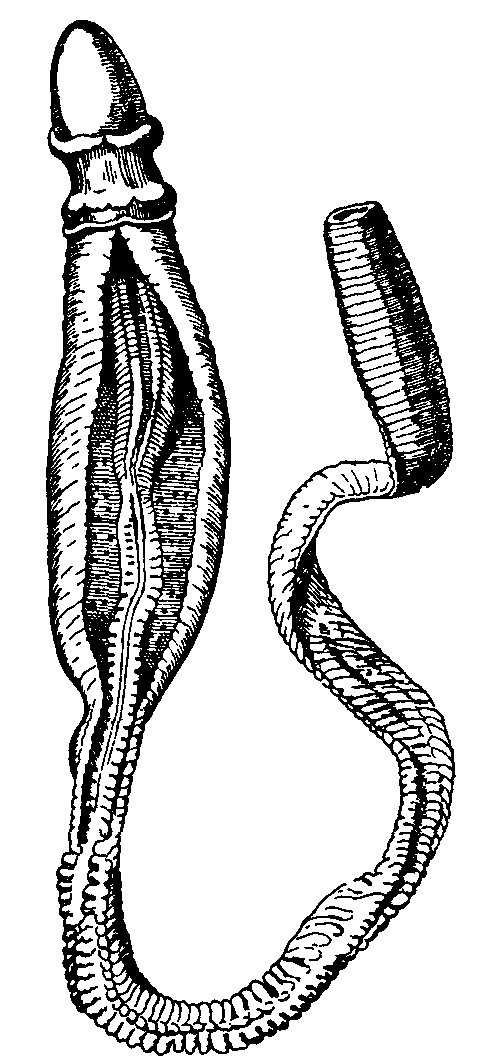
- Ptychodera flava

Scientific classification
- Kingdom: Animalia
- Phylum: Hemichordata
- Class: Enteropneusta
- Family: Ptychoderidae
- Genus: Ptychodera

Species
- See text.

= Ptychodera =

Genus of marine worm-like animals

Ptychodera is a genus of acorn worm.

== Species ==
- Ptychodera bahamensis Spengel, 1893
- Ptychodera ceylonica author unknown
- Ptychodera erythrea Spengel
- Ptychodera flava Eschscholtz, 1825
- Ptychodera pelsarti Dakin, 1916
