= Zanclopus cephalodisci =

Scientific classification
- Kingdom: Animalia
- Phylum: Arthropoda
- Class: Copepoda
- Order: Cyclopoida
- Family: Enterognathidae
- Genus: Zanclopus
- Species: Z. cephalodisci

Binomial name
- Zanclopus cephalodisci Calman, 1908

Species of crustacean

Zanclopus cephalodisci is a parasitic copepod that lives in the intestines of Cephalodiscus gilchristi, which gives the species its name.

== Physical ==
Individuals of Zanclopus cephalodisci have a maggot-shaped body with a length of 55mm to 62mm that is 3.5 times as long as wide. The integument is described as being thin and membranous with the segmentation being "obscure". The antennas are thick and short and are not segmented. The mouth cone isn't very prominent.

== Life ==
Only at most one adult female occurs per host and it lays eggs in the stomach of the host that float freely without being attached to anything. Sometime the eggs form packs of two or three. Eggs have a diameter of about 12mm.

Between two and four specimens were observed in one stomach during the larval stage, sometimes accompanied by an adult female but never an adult male.

Although it is not easy to reconstruct the whole life of a specimen, the size of the eggs suggest that the hatching takes place late in the development.
