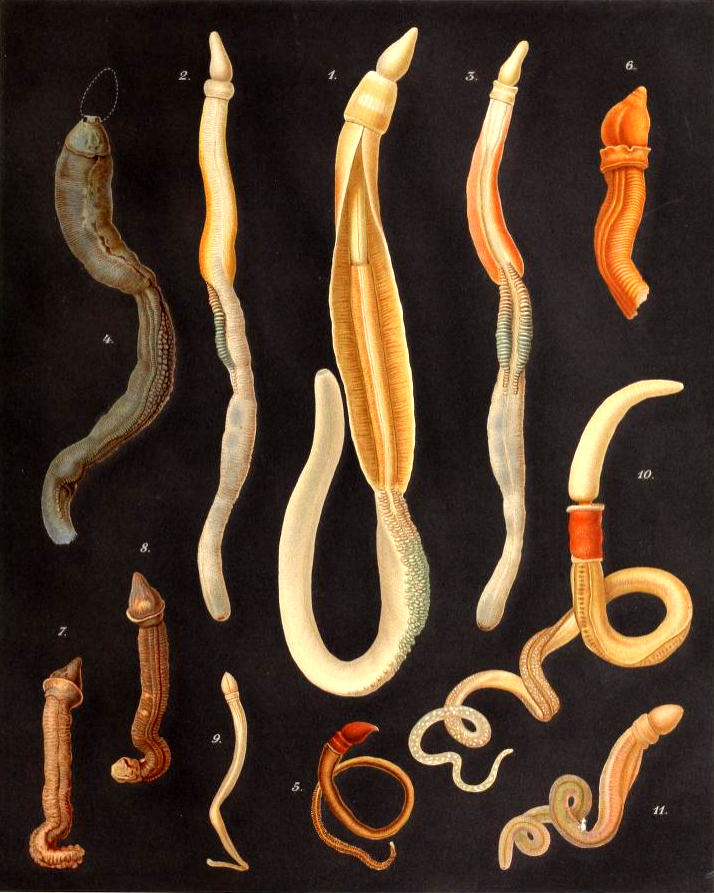
- Balanoglossus

Scientific classification
- Kingdom: Animalia
- Phylum: Hemichordata
- Class: Enteropneusta
- Family: Ptychoderidae

Genera
- Balanoglossus; Glossobalanus; Ptychodera

= Ptychoderidae =

Family of marine worm-like animals

Ptychoderidae is a family of acorn worms.

== Genera and species ==
The World Register of Marine Species lists the following:

=== Balanoglossus ===
Contains the following species:

- Balanoglossus apertus (Spengel, 1893)
- Balanoglossus aurantiacus (Girard, 1853)
- Balanoglossus australiensis (Hill, 1894)
- Balanoglossus borealis (Willey, 1899)
- Balanoglossus capensis (Gilchrist, 1908)
- Balanoglossus carnosus Müller in Spengel, 1893
- Balanoglossus clavigerus delle Chiaje, 1829
- Balanoglossus gigas Müller in Spengel, 1893
- Balanoglossus hydrocephalus van der Horst
- Balanoglossus misakiensis Kuwano, 1902
- Balanoglossus natalensis (Gilchrist, 1908)
- Balanoglossus occidentalis Ritter, 1902
- Balanoglossus proterogonius Belichov, 1928
- Balanoglossus robinii author unknown
- Balanoglossus salmoneus Belichov, 1928
- Balanoglossus stephensoni van der Horst, 1937
- Balanoglossus studiosorum van der Horst

=== Glossobalanus ===
Contains the following species:

- Glossobalanus alatus van der Horst
- Glossobalanus barnharti Cameron & Ostiguy, 2013
- Glossobalanus berkeleyi (Willey, 1931)
- Glossobalanus crozieri van der Horst, 1924
- Glossobalanus elongatus Spengel, 1904
- Glossobalanus hartmanae Cameron & Ostiguy, 2013
- Glossobalanus hedleyi (Hill, 1897)
- Glossobalanus indicus Rao, 1955
- Glossobalanus marginatus Meek, 1922
- Glossobalanus minutus Kowalevsky, 1866
- Glossobalanus mortenseni van der Horst, 1932
- Glossobalanus parvulus (Punnett, 1906)
- Glossobalanus ruficollis (Willey, 1899)
- Glossobalanus sarniensis (Koehler, 1886)
- Glossobalanus williami Cameron & Ostiguy, 2013

=== Ptychodera ===
Contains the following species:

- Ptychodera bahamensis Spengel, 1893
- Ptychodera ceylonica author unknown
- Ptychodera erythrea Spengel
- Ptychodera flava Eschscholtz, 1825
- Ptychodera pelsarti Dakin, 1916
