= Dibromophenol =

Dibromophenols are a group of bromophenols consisting of one hydroxy group and two bromine atoms bonded to a benzene ring. There are six structural isomers, each with the molecular formula C_{6}H_{4}Br_{2}O, which differ by arrangement of the substituents.

Dibromophenols
Name	2,3-Dibromophenol, 1,2-Dibromo- 3-hydroxybenzene	2,4-Dibromophenol, 1,3-Dibromo- 6-hydroxybenzene	2,5-Dibromophenol, 1,4-Dibromo- 2-hydroxybenzene	2,6-Dibromophenol, 1,3-Dibromo- 2-hydroxybenzene	3,4-Dibromophenol, 1,2-Dibromo- 4-hydroxybenzene	3,5-Dibromophenol, 1,3-Dibromo- 5-hydroxybenzene
Structural formula						
CAS Number	57383-80-9	615-58-7	28165-52-8	608-33-3	615-56-5	626-41-5
PubChem	CID 34264 from PubChem	CID 12005 from PubChem	CID 34177 from PubChem	CID 11847 from PubChem	CID 12003 from PubChem	CID 12280 from PubChem
Chemical formula	C_{6}H_{4}Br_{2}O					
Molar mass	251.90 g/mol					
Physical state	Solid					
Melting point	68–69 °C	40 °C	73–74 °C	56–57 °C	94 °C	81 °C
pKa		7.79 (25 °C)		6.67 (25 °C)		8.06 (25 °C)
GHS hazard pictograms		(GHS06: Toxic)		(GHS07: Exclamation mark)		(GHS06: Toxic)
H- and P-phrases		H300, H315, H319, H335		H302, H312, H332		H301, H315, H319, H335
H- and P-phrases		P261, P264, P301+P310; P305+P351+P338		P280		P261, P301+P310; P305+P351+P338
