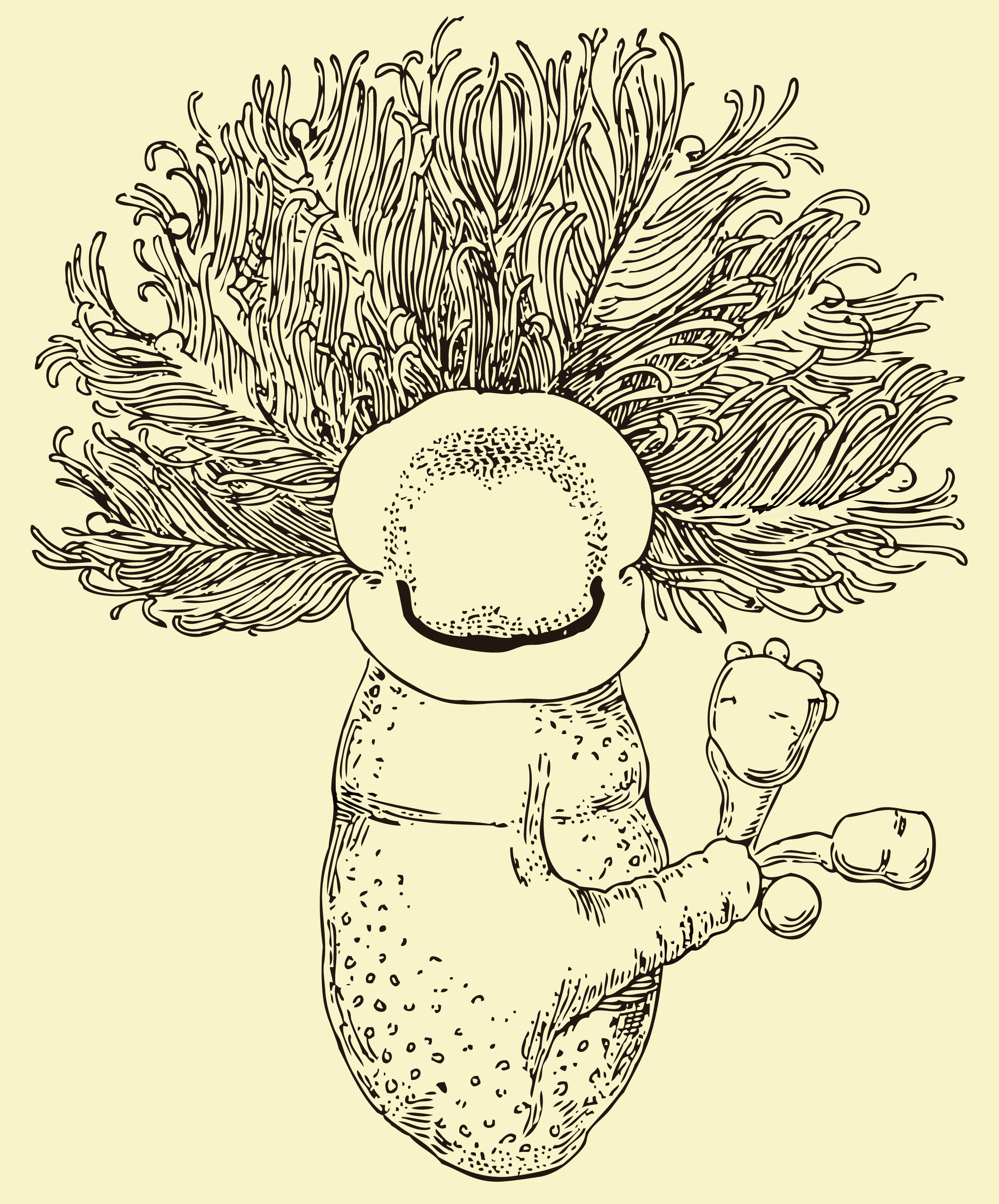
- Cephalodiscus dodecalophus

Scientific classification
- Kingdom: Animalia
- Phylum: Hemichordata
- Class: Pterobranchia
- Order: Cephalodiscida; Fowler, 1892

Families
- Cephalodiscidae Harmer, 1905; †Rotaciurcidae Briggs & Koch, 2023

Synonyms
- Cephalodiscoidea Beklemishev, 1951

= Cephalodiscida =

Cephalodiscida Temporal range: Cambrian (Wuliuan)–Present

Order in the class Pterobranchia in the phylum Hemichordata

Cephalodiscida is one of two orders in the class Pterobranchia, which are small, worm-shaped animals. Members belong to the hemichordates. Species in this order are sessile, living in clear water and secrete tubes on the ocean floor.

== Taxonomy ==
The following taxa are recognised in the order Cephalodiscida:

- Order Cephalodiscida Fowler, 1892
  - Family Cephalodiscidae Harmer, 1905
    - Genus Atubaria Sato, 1936
    - Genus Cephalodiscus M'Intosh, 1882
    - Genus †Aellograptus Obut, 1964
    - Genus †Eocephalodiscus Kozłowski, 1949
    - Genus †Melanostrophus Öpik, 1930
    - Genus †Pterobranchites Kozłowski, 1967
  - Family †Rotaciurcidae Briggs & Koch, 2023
    - Genus †Rotaciurca Briggs & Koch 2023
