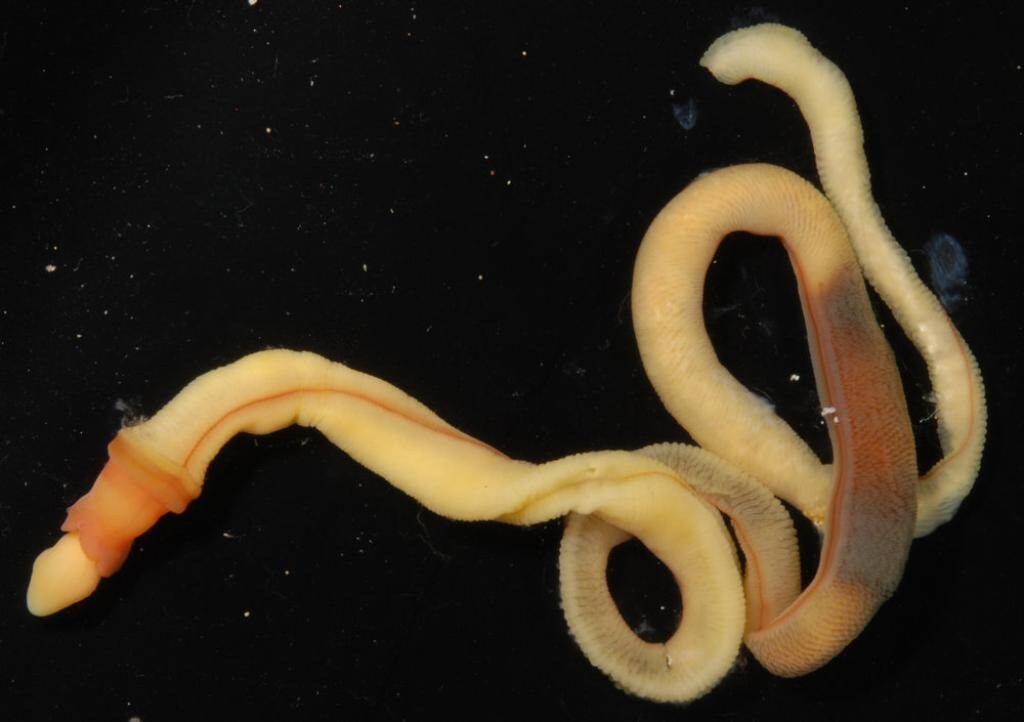
- Acorn worm (Enteropneusta)
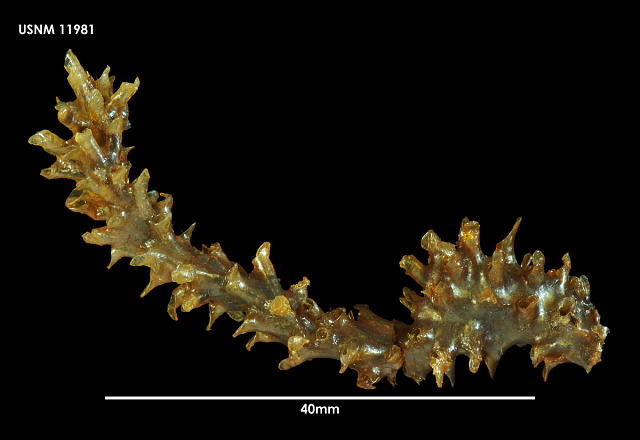
- Cephalodiscus nigrescens (Pterobranchia)

Scientific classification
- Kingdom: Animalia
- Subkingdom: Eumetazoa
- Clade: ParaHoxozoa
- Clade: Bilateria
- Clade: Nephrozoa
- Superphylum: Deuterostomia
- Clade: Ambulacraria
- Phylum: Hemichordata; Bateson, 1885

Classes
- Planctosphaeroidea; Enteropneusta; Pterobranchia

= Hemichordate =

Hemichordate Temporal range: Fortunian–Present

Phylum of marine deuterostome animals

Hemichordata (/ˌhɛmɪkɔːrˈdeɪtə/ HEM-ih-kor-DAY-tə) is a phylum that consists of triploblastic, eucoelomate, and bilaterally symmetrical marine deuterostome animals, generally considered the sister group of the echinoderms. They appear in the Lower or Middle Cambrian and include two main classes: Enteropneusta (acorn worms) and Pterobranchia. A third class, Planctosphaeroidea, is known only from the larva of a single species, Planctosphaera pelagica. The subclass Graptolithina, formerly considered extinct, is now placed within the pterobranchs, represented by a single living genus Rhabdopleura.

Acorn worms are solitary worm-shaped organisms. They generally live in burrows (the earliest secreted tubes) and are deposit feeders, but some species are pharyngeal filter feeders, while the family Torquaratoridae are free-living detritivores. Many are well known for their production and accumulation of various halogenated phenols and pyrroles. Pterobranchs are filter-feeders, mostly colonial, living in a collagenous tubular structure called a coenecium.

The discovery of the stem group hemichordate Gyaltsenglossus shows that early hemichordates combined aspects of the two morphologically disparate classes.

== Anatomy ==
The body plan of hemichordates is characterized by a muscular organization. The anteroposterior axis is divided into three parts: the anterior prosome, the intermediate mesosome, and the posterior metasome.

The body of acorn worms is worm-shaped and divided into an anterior proboscis, an intermediate collar, and a posterior trunk. The proboscis is a muscular and ciliated organ used in locomotion and in the collection and transport of food particles. The mouth is located between the proboscis and the collar. The trunk is the longest part of the animal. It contains the pharynx, which is perforated with gill slits (or pharyngeal slits), the oesophagus, a long intestine, and a terminal anus. It also contains the gonads. A post-anal tail is present in juvenile members of the acorn worm family Harrimaniidae.

Anatomy of Saccoglossus kowalevskii

The prosome of pterobranchs is specialized into a muscular and ciliated cephalic shield used in locomotion and in secreting the coenecium. The mesosome extends into one pair (in the genus Rhabdopleura) or several pairs (in the genus Cephalodiscus) of tentaculated arms used in filter feeding. The metasome, or trunk, contains a looped digestive tract, gonads, and extends into a contractile stalk that connects individuals to the other members of the colony, produced by asexual budding. In the genus Cephalodiscus, asexually produced individuals stay attached to the contractile stalk of the parent individual until completing their development. In the genus Rhabdopleura, zooids are permanently connected to the rest of the colony via a common stolon system.

Some species biomineralize in calcium carbonate.

They have a diverticulum of the foregut called a stomochord, previously thought to be related to the chordate notochord, but this is most likely the result of convergent evolution rather than a homology.

=== Nervous system ===
The nervous system is a sub-epidermal diffused nerve net that is thickened in the mid-dorsal and mid-ventral regions. A hollow dorsal nerve cord (exists in some species) is present in the collar region that consists of concentrated nerve plexuses. It is considered as the most advanced part and is probably a primitive trait that they share with the common ancestor of Chordata and the rest of the deuterostomes.

There is no centralized brain but the nerve plexus and ganglia in anterior regions function as key information processing centers. Because the nervous system is largely in the epidermis, it acts as a "skin brain" with many cells acting as both sensory and motor controllers.

Hemichordates lack complex sense organs but possess photoreceptor cells, such as pigmented eyespots at the apical ganglion, and chemoreceptive pre-oral organs. No evidence of neuromuscular junctions suggests that movement of the organism is regulated by the action of neurotransmitters that are released in the muscular tissues.

The nervous system of adult enteropneusts consists of:

- the basiepidermal nerve net
- the dorsal nerve cord
- the ventral nerve cord
- the prebranchial nerve ring
- the apical ganglion

=== Circulatory system ===
Hemichordates have an open circulatory system, that is without any capillaries.

The vascular system itself is quite peculiar, consisting of lacunae and channels without endothelium. The central sinus lies over the stomochord and is surrounded by a closed vesicle of contractile walls called the pericardium. The heart, located dorsally in the proboscis region, consists of a sinus, but the blood does not actually enter the heart, so it is not a heart in the strict sense. By the pulsating movement of the pericardial vesicle, the blood is driven into two longitudinal blood vessels, dorsal and ventral, and a series of sinuses where the tissues bathe in blood. The dorsal vessel leads the blood to the gill-slits(when present), where it is oxygenated, and then it returns through the ventral vessel. The blood is colourless and has no respiratory pigments.

In Enteropneusta, blood enters the glomerulus, a vascular complex on either side of the anterior part of stomochord, from where it accomplishes its excretion.

=== Respiratory system ===
Respiration in Hemichordates primarily occurs through several pairs of gill slits that are located dorsally on the trunk region. The branchial portion of the pharynx is specialized to hold these gill slits, distinctively from the lateral position often found in chordates. In most species of Balanoglossus, each gill slit may open into its own atrial chamber or gill-pouch, which in turn further opens into the exterior. Gaseous exchange occurs in these gill-pouches. The opening to the exterior is enclosed by gill pores that occur on each side of the dorsal region of the worm, at the base of a shallow, branchial groove.

Acorn worms breathe by drawing in water rich in diffused oxygen through the buccal cavity. The water passes into the pharynx and enters the gill slits, allowing for efficient extraction via simple diffusion. Water then exits through the gill pores on its trunk.

=== Digestive system ===
The digestive system in hemichordates is composed of a rudimentary tube-like gut that ends into a terminal anus. Food enters into the mouth and passes through the buccal cavity into the pharynx, where it gets separated from water that enters gill slits for respiration. The pharynx leads into an esophagus, which opens into the intestine, the main site of digestion and absorption. The intestine is the longest portion of their alimentary canal, extending through the trunk to the terminal anus. It acts as a straight, ciliated tube responsible for the digestion of organic material within the mud or detritus consumed by the animal. It breaks down food particles, which are pulled through the tract primarily by cilia rather than muscular contraction. The intestine often exhibits characteristic hepatic caeca or liver sacs, in the middle trunk region, as dorsolateral swellings. The undigested food and waste is ultimately discarded via the anus.

Although the digestive tract is generally a straight tract, some classes like Pterobrachia have specialized U-shaped intestine, as an adaptation to their sedentary or semi-sedentary lifestyle, allowing the organism to have their anus close to their mouth for defecating near the entrance of the burrows.

== Development ==
Together with the echinoderms, the hemichordates form the Ambulacraria, which are the closest extant phylogenetic relatives of chordates. Thus these marine worms are of great interest for the study of the origins of chordate development. There are several species of hemichordates, with a moderate diversity of embryological development among these species. Hemichordates are classically known to develop in two ways, both directly and indirectly. Hemichordates are a phylum composed of two classes, the enteropneusts and the pterobranchs, both being forms of marine worm.

The enteropneusts have two developmental strategies: direct and indirect development. The indirect developmental strategy includes an extended pelagic plankotrophic tornaria larval stage, which means that this hemichordate exists in a larval stage that feeds on plankton before turning into an adult worm. The pterobranch genus most extensively studied is Rhabdopleura from Plymouth, England and from Bermuda.

The following details the development of two popularly studied species of the Hemichordata phylum Saccoglossus kowalevskii and Ptychodera flava. Saccoglossus kowalevskii is a direct developer and Ptychodera flava is an indirect developer. Most of what has been detailed in hemichordate development has come from hemichordates that develop directly.

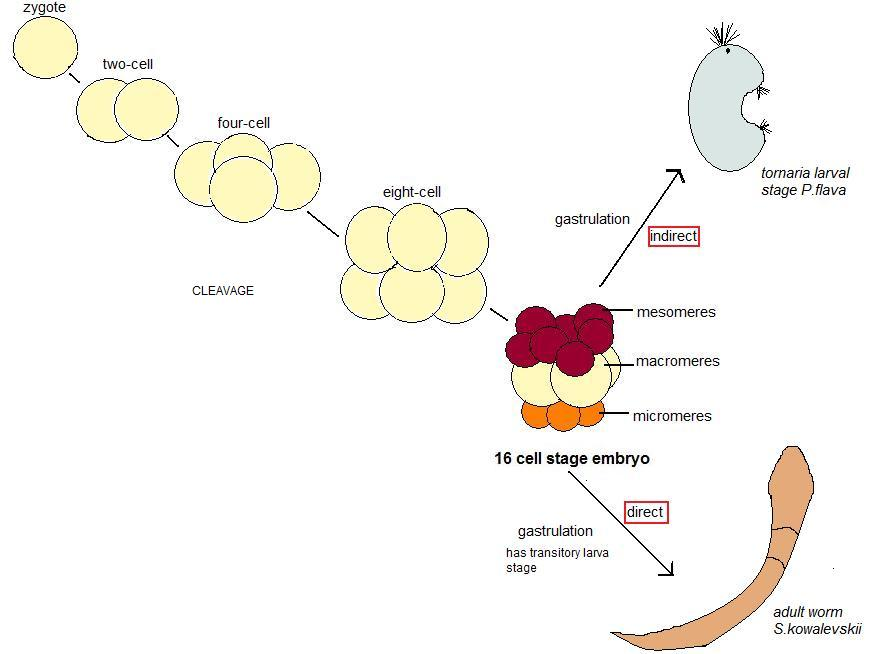
Schematic of embryonic cleavage and development in P. flava and S. kowalevskii

=== Ptychodera flava ===
P. flava's early cleavage pattern is similar to that of S. kowalevskii. The first and second cleavages from the single cell zygote of P. flava are equal cleavages, are orthogonal to each other and both include the animal and vegetal poles of the embryo. The third cleavage is equal and equatorial so that the embryo has four blastomeres both in the vegetal and the animal pole. The fourth division occurs mainly in blastomeres in the animal pole, which divide transversally as well as equally to make eight blastomeres. The four vegetal blastomeres divide equatorially but unequally and they give rise to four big macromeres and four smaller micromeres. Once this fourth division has occurred, the embryo has reached a 16 cell stage. P. flava has a 16 cell embryo with four vegetal micromeres, eight animal mesomeres and four larger macromeres. Further divisions occur until P. flava finishes the blastula stage and goes on to gastrulation. The animal mesomeres of P. flava go on to give rise to the larva's ectoderm, animal blastomeres also appear to give rise to these structures though the exact contribution varies from embryo to embryo. The macromeres give rise to the posterior larval ectoderm and the vegetal micromeres give rise to the internal endomesodermal tissues. Studies done on the potential of the embryo at different stages have shown that at both the two and four cell stage of development P. flava blastomeres can go on to give rise to a tornaria larvae, so fates of these embryonic cells don't seem to be established till after this stage.

=== Saccoglossus kowalevskii ===
Eggs of S. kowalevskii are oval in shape and become spherical in shape after fertilization. The first cleavage occurs from the animal to the vegetal pole and usually is equal though very often can also be unequal. The second cleavage to reach the embryos four cell stage also occurs from the animal to the vegetal pole in an approximately equal fashion though like the first cleavage it's possible to have an unequal division. The eight cell stage cleavage is latitudinal; so that each cell from the four cell stage goes on to make two cells. The fourth division occurs first in the cells of the animal pole, which end up making eight blastomeres (mesomeres) that are not radially symmetric, then the four vegetal pole blastomeres divide to make a level of four large blastomeres (macromeres) and four very small blastomeres (micromeres). The fifth cleavage occurs first in the animal cells and then in the vegetal cells to give a 32 cell blastomere. The sixth cleavage occurs in a similar order and completes a 64 cell stage, finally the seventh cleavage marks the end of the cleavage stage with a blastula with 128 blastomeres. This structure goes on to go through gastrulation movements which will determine the body plan of the resulting gill slit larva, this larva will ultimately give rise to the marine acorn worm.

=== Genetic control of dorsal-ventral hemichordate patterning ===
Much of the genetic work done on hemichordates has been done to make comparison with chordates, so many of the genetic markers identified in this group are also found in chordates or are homologous to chordates in some way. Studies of this nature have been done particularly on S. kowalevskii, and like chordates S. kowalevskii has dorsalizing bmp-like factors such as bmp 2/4, which is homologous to Drosophila's decapentaplegic dpp. The expression of bmp2/4 begins at the onset of gastrulation on the ectodermal side of the embryo, and as gastrulation progresses its expression is narrowed down to the dorsal midline but is not expressed in the post-anal tail. The bmp antagonist chordin is also expressed in the endoderm of gastrulating S. kowalevskii. Besides these well known dorsalizing factors, further molecules known to be involved in dorsal ventral patterning are also present in S. kowalevskii, such as a netrin that groups with netrin gene class 1 and 2. Netrin is important in patterning of the neural system in chordates, as well as is the molecule Shh, but S. kowalevskii was only found to have one hh gene and it appears to be expressed in a region that is uncommon to where it is usually expressed in developing chordates along the ventral midline.

== Classification ==
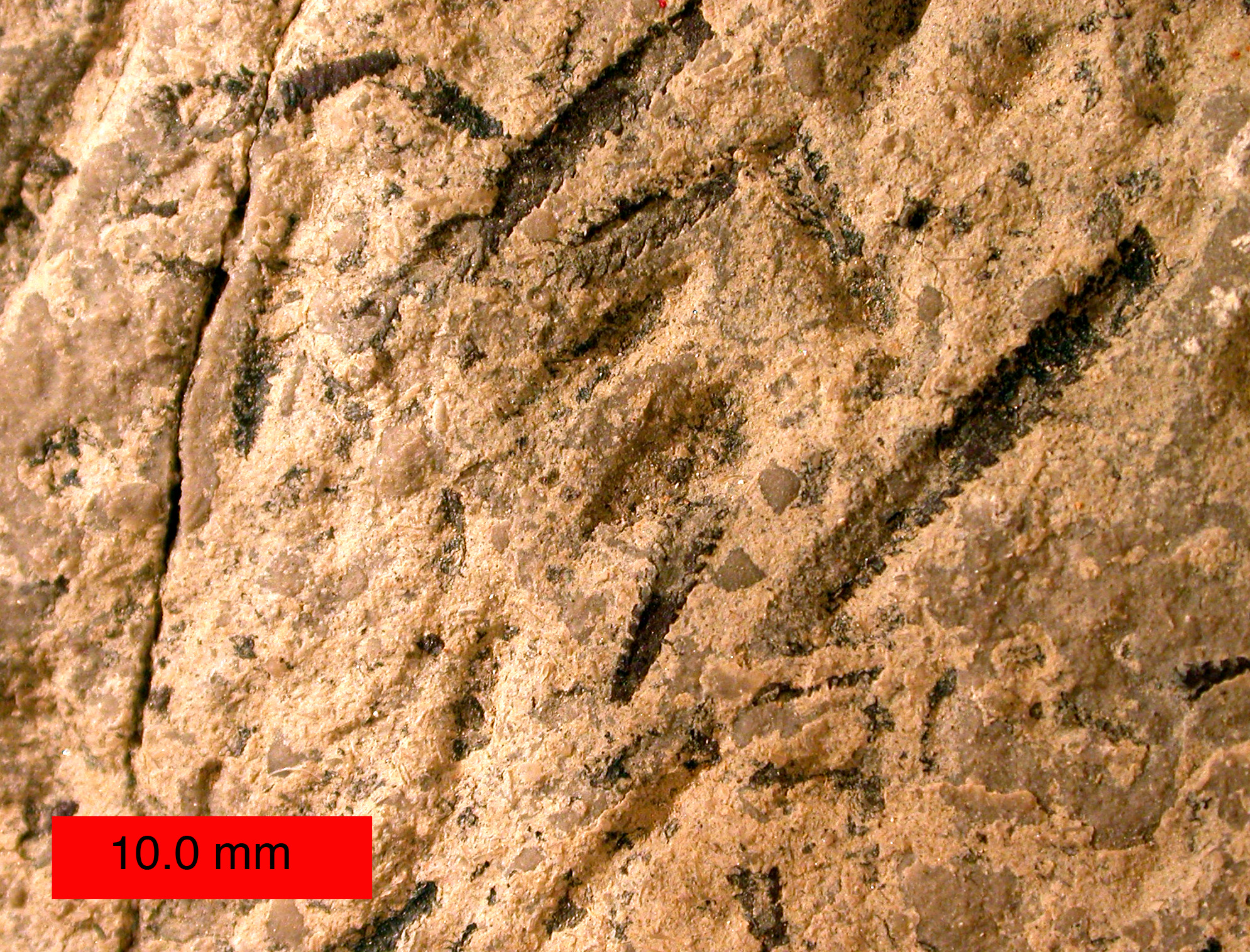
Amplexograptus, a graptolite hemichordate, from the Ordovician near Caney Springs, Tennessee.

Hemichordata are divided into two classes: the Enteropneusta, commonly called acorn worms, and the Pterobranchia, which includes the graptolites. A third class, Planctosphaeroidea, is proposed based on a single species known only from larvae. The phylum contains about 120 living species. Hemichordata appears to be sister to the Echinodermata as Ambulacraria; Xenoturbellida may be basal to that grouping. Pterobranchia may be derived from within Enteropneusta, making Enteropneusta paraphyletic. It is possible that the extinct organism Etacystis is a member of the Hemichordata, either within or with close affinity to the Pterobranchia.

There are 130 described species of Hemichordata and many new species are being discovered, especially in the deep sea.

=== Phylogeny ===
A phylogenetic tree showing the position of the hemichordates is:

- Deuterostomia
  - Chordata
    - Cephalochordata
    - Olfactores
      - Tunicata
      - Vertebrata/Craniata
  - Ambulacraria
    - Echinodermata
    - Hemichordata

Cladogram modified after He et al. 2026, with an emphasis on fossil and extant hemichordates and their position in the Ambulacraria.

- Ambulacraria (total group)
  - - Ambulacraria (crown group)
      - Echinodermata
      - Hemichordata
        - Pterobranchia (total group)
          - Pterobranchia (crown group)
          - †Gyaltsenglossus
        - Enteropneusta (total group)
          - Enteropneusta (crown group)
          - †Spartobranchus
          - †Oesia
    - †Yujingia
  - †Cambroernida
    - - †Eldonioidea
        - †Rotadiscus
        - - †Eldonia eumorpha
          - †Eldonia ludwigi
          - †Pararotadiscus
      - †Phlogites
    - †Herpetogaster

The internal relationships within the hemichordates are shown below. The tree is based on 16S +18S rRNA sequence data and phylogenomic studies from multiple sources.

- Hemichordata
  - Enteropneusta
    - Stereobalanus
    - - Harrimaniidae
      - - Spengeliidae
        - - Torquaratoridae
          - Ptychoderidae
  - Pterobranchia
    - Cephalodiscida
    - Graptolithina
      - Rhabdopleurida
      - †Eugraptolithina
        - †Dendroidea
        - †Graptoloidea

== Other references ==
- Cameron, C.B. (2005). "A phylogeny of the hemichordates based on morphological characters". Canadian Journal of Zoology. 83 (1): 196–2. Bibcode:2005CaJZ...83..196C. doi:10.1139/z04-190.
