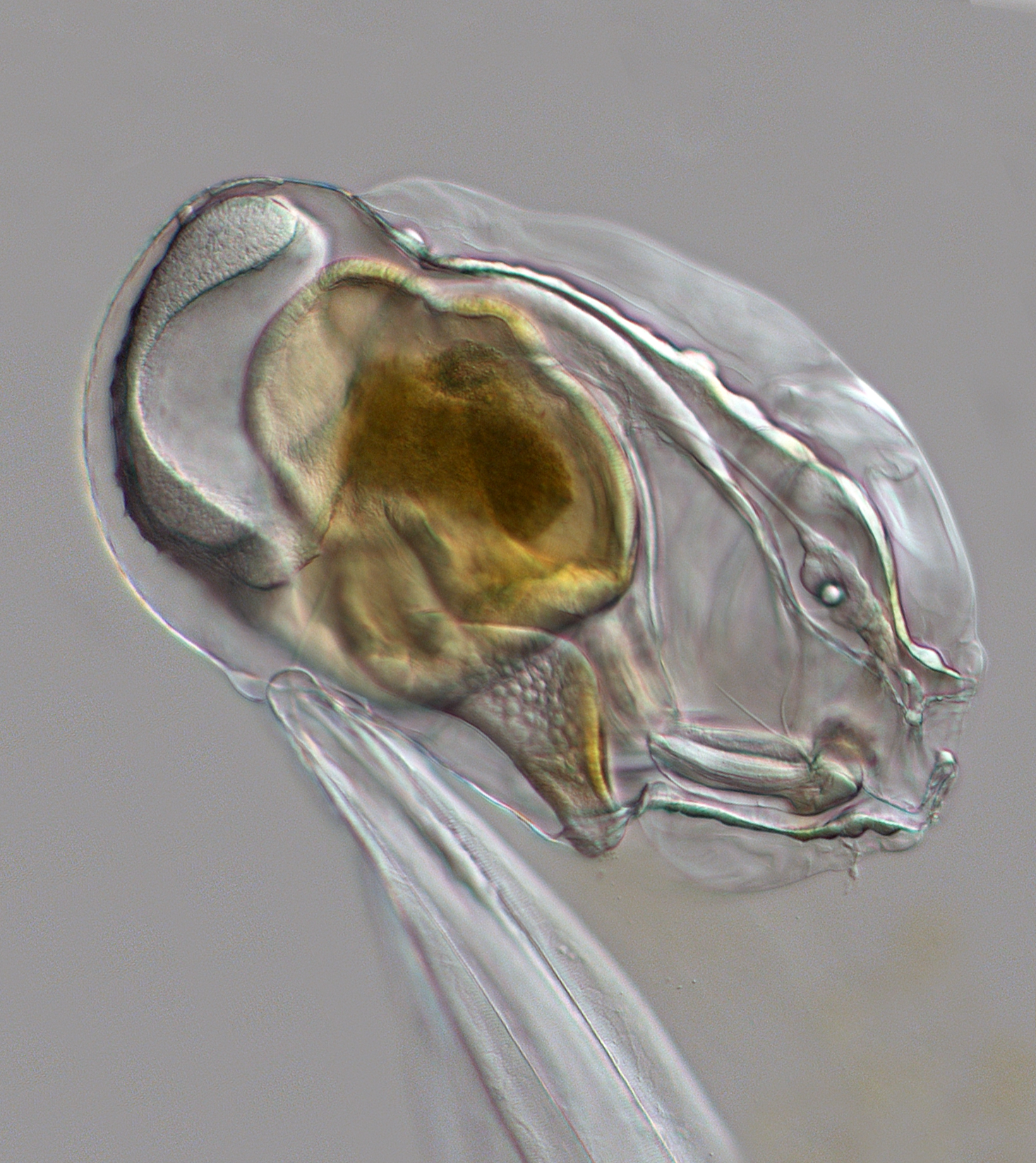
- Oikopleura dioica

Scientific classification
- Kingdom: Animalia
- Phylum: Chordata
- Subphylum: Tunicata
- Class: Appendicularia
- Order: Copelata
- Family: Oikopleuridae
- Subfamily: Oikopleurinae
- Tribe: Labiata
- Genus: Oikopleura; Mertens, 1830

= Oikopleura =

Genus of tunicates

Oikopleura is a genus of tunicates in the class Appendicularia (larvaceans). An organism of this genus forms a mucus house every four hours at 20 degrees Celsius. This house has a coarse mesh to keep out big particles, and a fine mesh that collects the small particles, down to the nanoplankton that includes (pelagic) bacteria.

Abandoned mucus houses sink to the deep, collecting organic particles during their descent. They make an important contribution to marine snow, since Oikopleura is abundant and filters very actively, using powerful strokes of its tail. Its abundance is less obvious from preserved samples (that are usually analyzed) because the gelatinous body disappears in the preservation process while leaving hardly any trace.

Species of Oikopleura have the smallest genomes in the animal kingdom, only about 75Mb.

Oikopleura contains bioluminescent species. About half of Oikopleura species are bioluminescent.

== Etymology ==
The genus name comes from oikos (meaning "house") and pleura ("rib", or "side of the body"), referring to their ability to build a mucus house like other larvaceans.

== Taxonomy ==
=== Phylogeny ===
Oikopleura has been found to possibly be paraphyletic with respect to several other oikopleurid genera, namely: Folia, Stegosoma, Mesoikopleura, and Megalocercus. The genus might also harbour more diversity than thought, with species complexes like Oikopleura dioica comprising several reproductively incompatible clades despite consistent general morphology.

=== List of species ===
- Oikopleura (Coecaria) Lohmann, 1933
  - Oikopleura (Coecaria) fusiformis Fol, 1872
    - Oikopleura (Coecaria) fusiformis cornutogastra Aida, 1907
  - Oikopleura (Coecaria) gracilis Lohmann, 1896
  - Oikopleura (Coecaria) intermedia Lohmann, 1896
  - Oikopleura (Coecaria) longicauda (Vogt, 1854)
- Oikopleura (Vexillaria) Lohmann, 1933
  - Oikopleura (Vexillaria) albicans (Leuckart, 1853)
  - Oikopleura (Vexillaria) caudaornata (Fenaux & Youngbluth, 1991)
  - Oikopleura (Vexillaria) cophocerca (Gegenbaur, 1855)
  - Oikopleura (Vexillaria) dioica Fol, 1872
  - Oikopleura (Vexillaria) gaussica Lohmann, 1905
  - Oikopleura (Vexillaria) gorskyi Flood, 2000
  - Oikopleura (Vexillaria) inflata (Fenaux & Youngbluth, 1991)
  - Oikopleura (Vexillaria) labradoriensis Lohmann, 1892
  - Oikopleura (Vexillaria) parva Lohmann, 1896
  - Oikopleura (Vexillaria) rufescens Fol, 1872
  - Oikopleura (Vexillaria) vanhoeffeni Lohman, 1896
  - Oikopleura (Vexillaria) villafrancae Fenaux, 1992

== Distribution ==
The oikopleurids are distributed in the tropical waters of all oceans and seas of the globe, having been reported widely in the Caribbean Sea and the western coasts of the Atlantic Ocean.

== Oikopleura dioica ==
A species of particular interest under this genus is the Oikopleura dioica, which is an anomaly among chordates. It has retained the fundamental body plan of the chordate; yet, it has lost the mechanism for retinoic acid signaling which operates during chordate development. The loss raises the question of the evolutionary constraints that have prevented similar changes in the other chordates.

Oikopleura dioica hox genes are distributed in nine locations around the genome whereas other chordates have a cluster of hox genes. Of note, this is the first chordate among the eukaryotes found to have operons.
