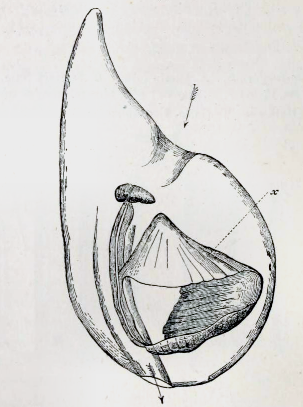
- Oikopleura cophocerca inside its house. The arrows show water flow and (x) shows the net which filters out plankton

Scientific classification
- Domain: Eukaryota
- Kingdom: Animalia
- Phylum: Chordata
- Subphylum: Tunicata
- Class: Appendicularia
- Order: Copelata
- Family: Oikopleuridae
- Genus: Oikopleura
- Species: O. cophocerca

Binomial name
- Oikopleura cophocerca (Gegenbaur, 1855)

= Oikopleura cophocerca =

Species of tunicate

Oikopleura cophocerca is a species of small pelagic tunicate found in the surface waters of most of the world's oceans. It superficially resembles a tadpole and is surrounded by a transparent mucus net known as a "house".

== Description ==
The trunk of Oikopleura cophocerca is oval and slightly arched and a few millimetres in length. A mouth at one end opens into a funnel-shaped pharynx and the anus is half way along the ventral surface. The endostyle is small and equidistant between the mouth and the anus. The branched ovary lies between the two testes. The tail is long, broad and muscular and contains remnants of the notochord as small, globular cells. The tail is attached just behind the anus and is bent forward to pass near the mouth. The tail has ventral and dorsal fins running along its length. However, because it is twisted through a right angle, it appears to have fins on its left and right sides and it undulates up and down rather than from side to side. The exoskeleton of this class of tunicates consists of a mucus net which is known as a "house" and surrounds the animal's body like a bubble.

== Distribution ==
Oikopleura cophocerca has a cosmopolitan distribution and is found, mainly in the surface layers, in temperate and tropical parts of the Atlantic Ocean, the Caribbean Sea, the Gulf Of Mexico, the Mediterranean Sea, the Red Sea, the Indian Ocean and the Pacific Ocean. In the Gulf of Mexico it is found on the Tabasco–Campeche shelf where its maximum abundance is associated with the up-welling of water caused by the Yucatán Current.

== Biology ==
Oikopleura cophocerca, like other appendicularians, secretes a mucus net known as a "house" (Greek Oikos, house) inside which it lives. Periodically this gelatinous house is rolled up and abandoned, a new house being secreted within about a minute. This structure is inflated with sea water by undulations of the tail and further tail movements maintain a flow of water through it. The house has two inflow entrances and one outflow, between which are various passageways and two fine filters to catch food particles. The mucus net is a very efficient means of concentrating the minute planktonic particles on which this animal feeds and the appendicularian is in effect, swimming in a concentrated planktonic broth. At 20 °C, Oikopleura cophocerca builds and discards two houses each day.

Appendicularians are hermaphrodites and sexual reproduction is the only means of reproduction in this species. The testes ripen first and sperm is shed into the sea. When the ovary ripens, the body wall of the animal ruptures to release the eggs and the animal dies in the process. The development of the zygote is rapid and direct and the embryo starts to feed and secrete a mucus net within twenty four hours.
