= Glossary of tunicate anatomy =

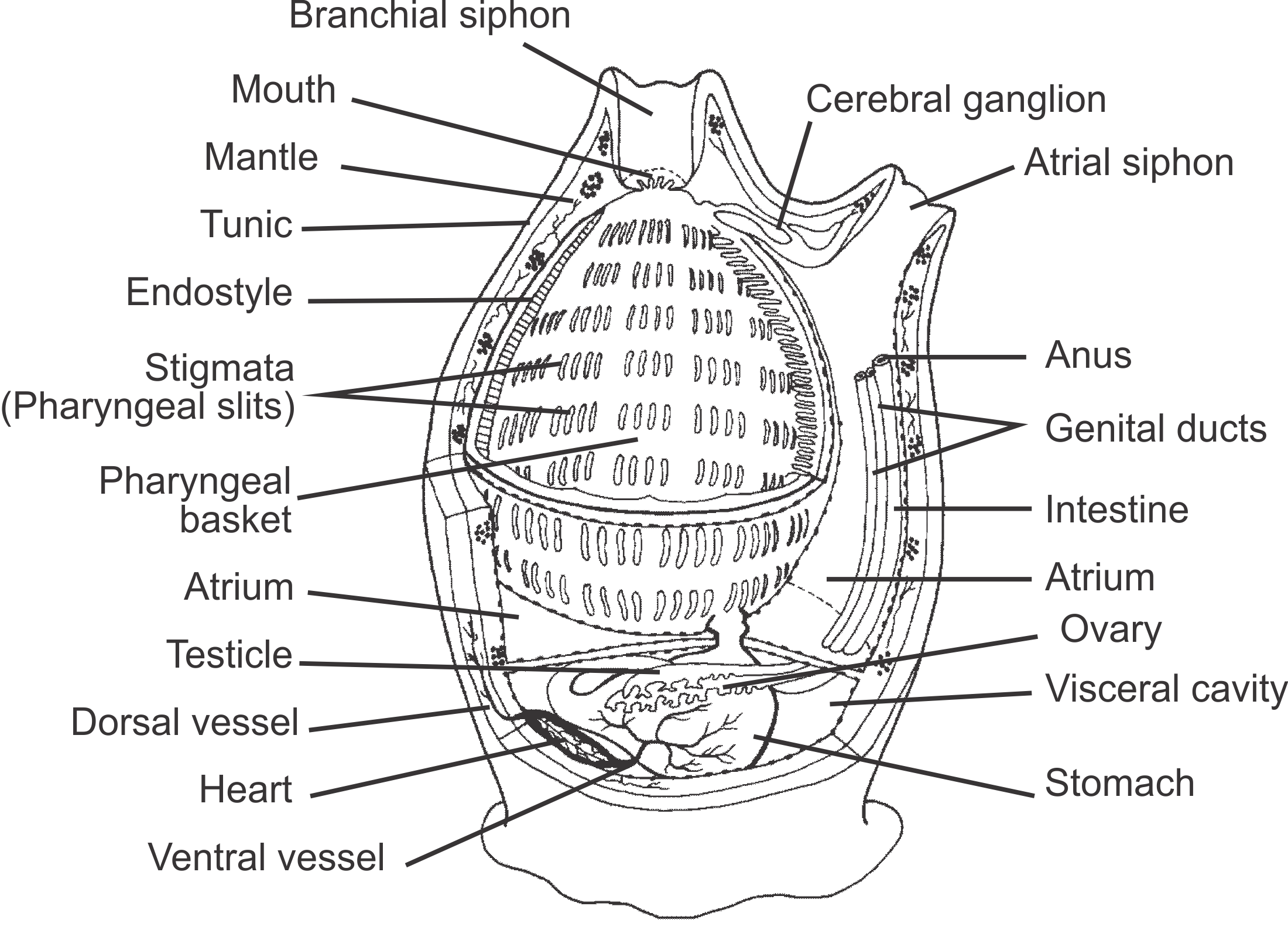
Illustration of an adult ascidian, showing the branchial siphon, atrial siphon, cerebral ganglion, mantle, tunic, endostyle, stigmata, branchial basket and atrium

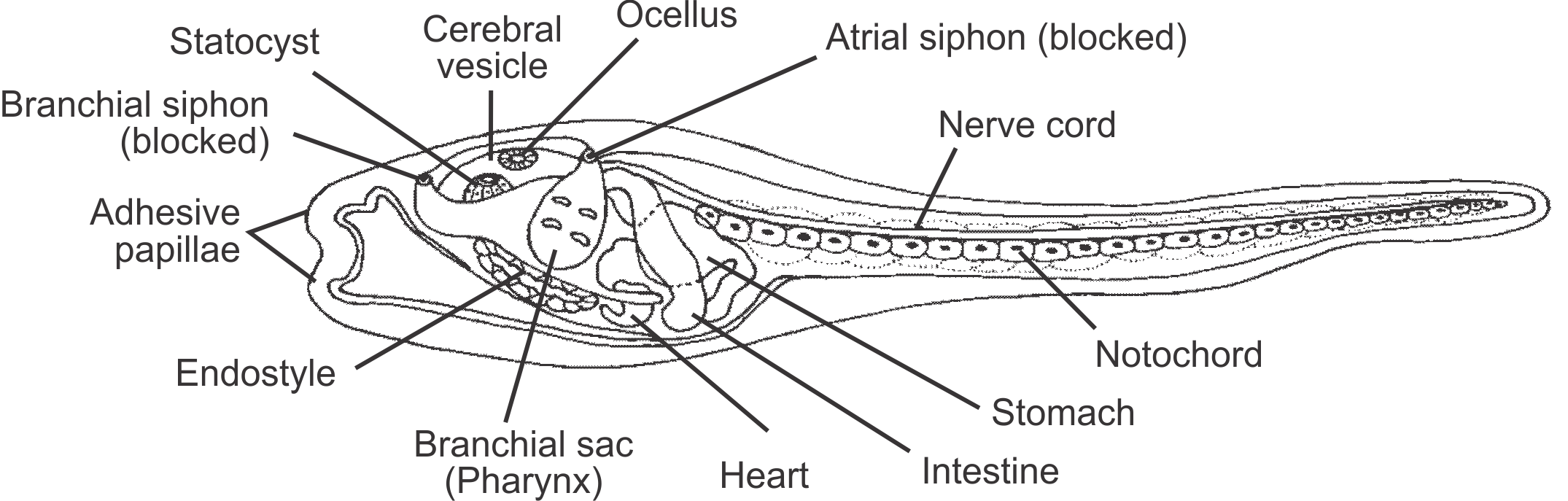
Illustration of a larval ascidian, showing the papillae, cerebral vesicle, ocellus and statocyst

Tunicates (subphylum Tunicata) are a group of filter-feeding marine invertebrates. As chordates, they have been proposed to be the closest relatives of vertebrates. Tunicates are divided into three classes: the sessile Ascidiacea, and the free-swimming Thaliacea and Appendicularia. Some anatomical features are shared between classes, while others are specific to a lineage or to a life stage.

== A ==
adhesive organ
1. An organ present at the anterior end of ascidian larvae, serving to attach the larva to the substrate during its metamorphosis. It is usually made of three papillae.
2. The individual papillae.
atrium
atrial pore
atrial siphon

Opening through which water exits the branchial basket in ascidians.

== B ==
blastozooid
Sexual generation in the life cycle of salps. They grow from the parent oozooid before budding off and sexually reproducing, with internal fertilization. In most species, females are viviparous and grow a single oozooid.
branchial basket

Main pumping and filtering cavity of the tunicate body. It is lined with stigmata through which water is filtered. In ascidians, the branchial basket can be flat, or folded in various arrangements.

brooding
Method of reproduction in ascidians, where zygotes are incubated inside the body of the individual. In some species, a dedicated brood pouch is present.
budding
Method of reproduction in colonial tunicates, where new zooids, or "buds", grow from the body of existing zooids or from stolons.

== C ==
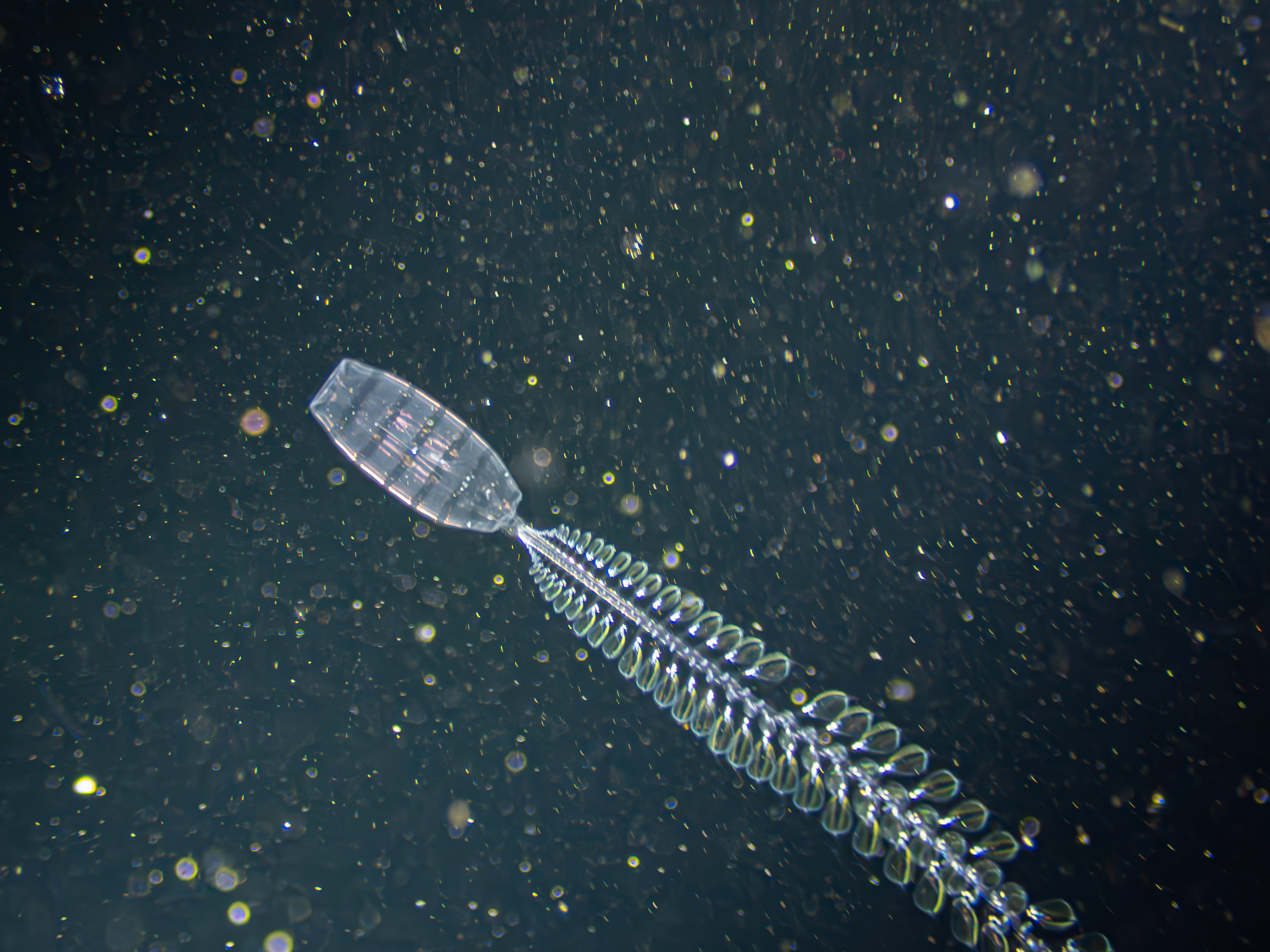
A nurse with developing zooids attached to its cadophore

cadophore
Stolon-like posterior extension of the doliolid nurse comprising three pairs of rows from which phorozooids and trophozooids develop.
cerebral ganglion
coronal organ
Sensory organ present in the oral aperture of ascidians and most thaliaceans (except salps). Made of a row of secondary sensory cells (hair cells), it monitors the flow of incoming water and prevents large particles from entering. It has been suggested to be homologous to the circumoral ring of larvaceans.

== D ==
dorsal strand
Posterior extension of the neural gland.
dorsal tubercle
Ciliated funnel connecting the neural gland to the branchial basket. Its shape varies between species, from a simple U-shaped funnel to a longer slit-like or more elaborate structure.

== E ==
endostyle
Mucus-secreting organ located inside the branchial basket. The mucus net it produces lines the inner branchial basket, and captures food particles. It is believed to be homologous to the thyroid in vertebrates.

== G ==
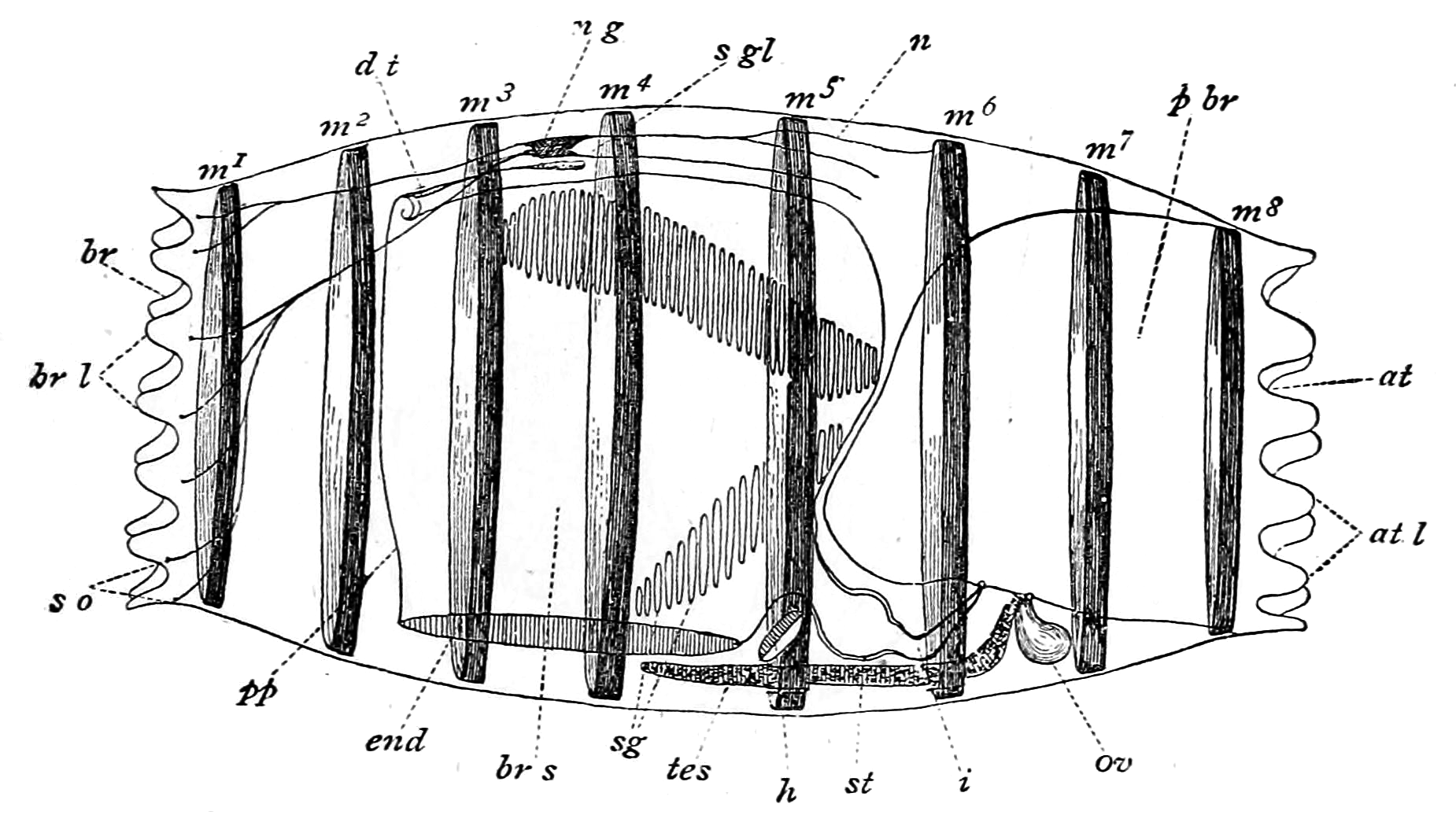
Gonozooid of Doliolum denticulatum: m1-m8) muscle bands; at) atrial apertures; br) branchial apertures; br s) branchial sac; sg) stigmata; st) stomach; ng) nerve ganglion; so) sense organs

gonozooid
Sexual generation in the life cycle of doliolids. They grow from a stalk connecting the phorozooid to its parent oozooid. After the phorozooid breaks off, the gonozooids keep growing attached to its ventral peduncle, until themselves breaking off and becoming free-living. Gonozooids are hermaphroditic and reproduce by internal fertilization.

== H ==
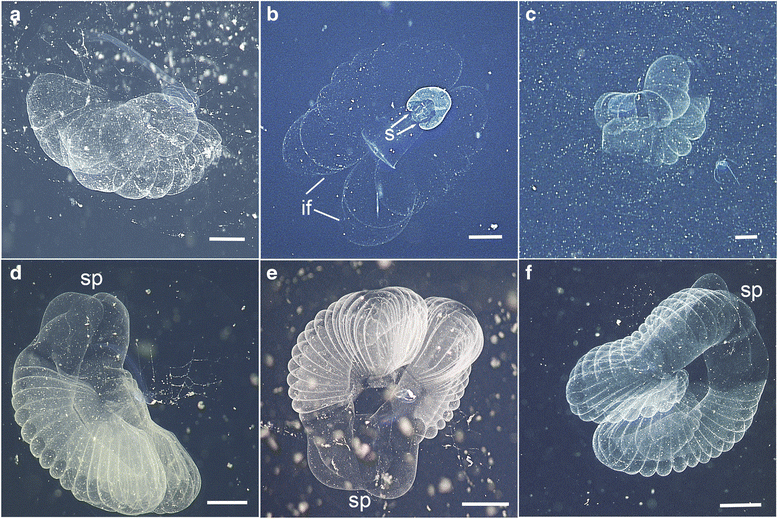
Houses of Bathochordaeus charon (top row) and B. stygius (bottom row)

house
A structure secreted by larvaceans, composed of oikosins and cellulose. It comprises several chambers, and fully surrounds the body in some species. Houses are used for filter-feeding and to provide buoyancy, and are repeatedly discarded and replaced after becoming clogged.
hyaline cap
Glue reservoir positioned at the anterior tip of the papillae, secreting adhesive material upon contact with the substrate.

== M ==
mantle

Epidermal epithelium layer located below the tunic.

== N ==
neural gland
Gland connected to the brain, together forming the neural complex. Its exact function is unclear. It is believed to be homologous to the anterior pituitary in vertebrates.
nurse
Mature stage of the oozooid in doliolids, capable of producing phorozooids and trophozooids.

== O ==
ocellus
Light-sensing organ inside the sensory vesicle. It is multicellular, containing a cup-shaped pigment cell, three lens cells, and various kinds of photoreceptor cells.

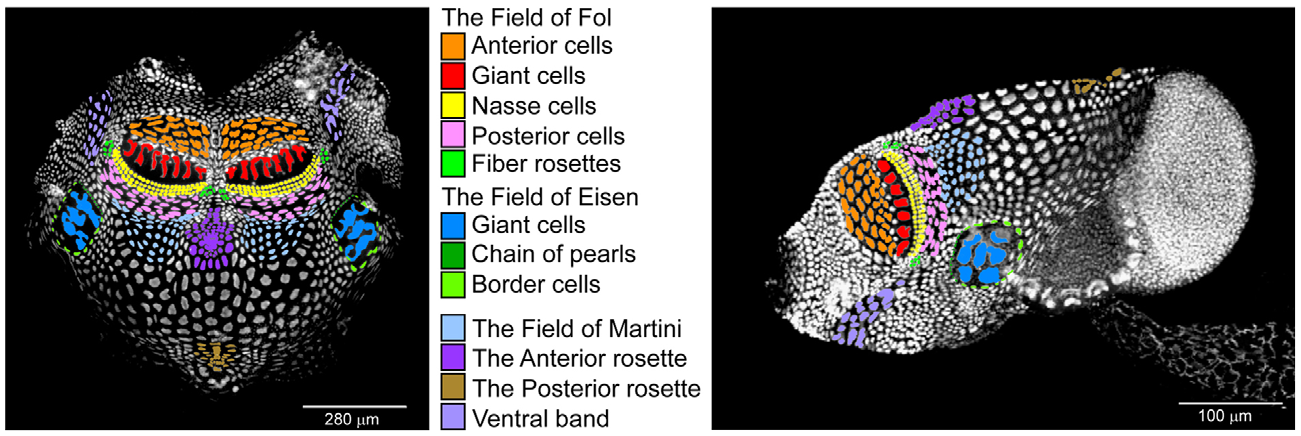
Oikoplastic epithelium in Oikopleura dioica, colored by cellular field

oikoplast

Oikosin-producing layer of epithelium surrounding the trunk of larvaceans. The secreted oikosins form a pre-house above the epithelium before being inflated into the house. It is divided in multiple cellular fields, varying in cell morphology and involved in the formation of different parts of the house.

oikosin
Glycoproteins constituting the larvacean house, secreted from the oikoplast.
oozooid
Asexual generation in the life cycle of salps and doliolids. In both groups, oozooids reproduce by budding from a ventral stolon.
oral siphon

Opening through which water enters the branchial basket in ascidians.

otolith

Gravity-sensing organ inside the sensory vesicle. It usually consists of a single large cell, with a foot extending to the ventral wall of the sensory vesicle and a round body containing a melanin granule.

== P ==
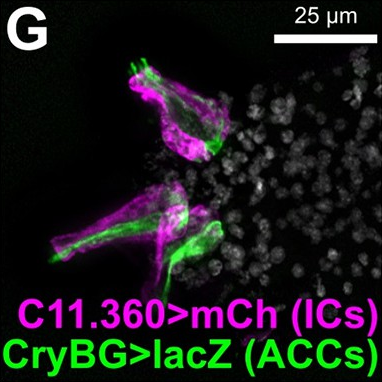
Colorized papillae of a Ciona robusta larva

papillae

Adhesive protrusions helping ascidian larvae to attach to their substrate. They are located at the anterior end of the larva, below the tunic. In most species, three papillae are present. They are made of three types of cells: collocytes secreting an adhesive material, ciliated neurons playing a role in triggering metamorphosis, and axial columnar cells possessing sensory properties. The papillae end in a hyaline cap. They are usually conical in solitary tunicates, and eversible in colonial tunicates. The set of papillae is also referred to as the adhesive organ.

peripharyngeal band
phorozooid
Asexual generation in the life cycle of doliolids. Phorozooids develop from buds produced by the oozooid having migrated to the paired central rows of the cadophore. They detach from the oozooid while carrying developing gonozooids on their ventral peduncles, before later releasing them.

== S ==
sensory vesicle
Main neural concentration in ascidian larvae. It contains the ocellus and otolith, while its posterior part is involved in brain activity.
siphon
stigmata

Orifices in the branchial basket. They are lined with bands of cilia that help filter water. In ascidians, they can vary in shape, with some species having elongated or spiral stigmata.

stolon
Structure connecting zooids to each other or to buds in a colony.

== T ==
trophozooid

Asexually produced zooids in the life cycle of doliolids. They develop from buds produced by the oozooid having migrated to the lateral rows of the cadophore. Their role is to feed the colony, including the oozooid.

trunk ganglion

Enlarged region of the neural tube posterior to the sensory cavity, separated from it by a narrow neck region.

tunic
Extracellular layer covering the epidermis in ascidians and thaliaceans. Fibers of biogenic cellulose, also called tunicin, make up the tunic's skeleton. Free-living cells are present within the tunic, and play a role in its synthes and healing.

== Z ==
zooid
Individual member of a tunicate colony.
