= Fritillaria (tunicate) =

Scientific classification
- Domain: Eukaryota
- Kingdom: Animalia
- Phylum: Chordata
- Subphylum: Tunicata
- Class: Appendicularia
- Order: Copelata
- Family: Fritillariidae
- Subfamily: Fritillariinae
- Genus: Fritillaria; Fol, 1872

Species
- See text

Larvacean genus

Fritillaria is a genus of larvacean tunicates belonging to the family Fritillariidae.

== Anatomy and behavior ==
Fritillaria differs from other larvaceans like the well-studied Oikopleura by having an elongated trunk region, divided into three distinct sections.

Only the anterior section, comprising the mouth, pharynx and cerebral ganglion, is covered in oikoplastic epithelium. It features a dorsal projection of epithelium, comprising many cellulose-secreting oikoplasts.

The middle section, connected to the front by the oesophagus, comprises the gut and anus, and connects to the tail. In the larva, it is covered by the epithelium, before the latter retracts to the anterior lobe and differentiates into oikoplasts.

The posterior section houses the gonads, growing inside an extension of the trunk.

The latter two sections are devoid of epidermis, instead replaced by a thin cuticular layer secreted by the epithelium during the larval stage.

=== House ===
Like other larvaceans, Fritillaria secretes a house made of mucopolysaccharides and cellulose, helping catch food particles for filter-feeding. However, Fritillaria's house does not fully cover the animal, instead only expanding on the anterior side. Also, instead of being discarded when clogged like in other larvacean genera, it is here regularly inflated and deflated, helping cleaning off clogged particles.

== Distribution ==
Fritillaria is a widespread genus of larvaceans. Unusually for larvaceans, F. rex has been reported to occur deep into the bathypelagic zone in Monterey Bay.

== Species ==
- Fritillaria aberrans Lohmann, 1896
- Fritillaria abjornseni Lohmann, 1909
- Fritillaria aequatorialis Lohmann, 1896
- Fritillaria amphigonadis Hopcroft & Robison, 2005
- Fritillaria antarctica Lohmann, 1905
- Fritillaria arafoera Tokioka, 1956
- Fritillaria borealis Lohmann, 1896
- Fritillaria charybdae Lohmann, 1926
- Fritillaria drygalskii Lohmann, 1923
- Fritillaria fagei Fenaux, 1961
- Fritillaria formica Fol, 1872
- Fritillaria fraudax Lohmann, 1896
- Fritillaria gracilis Lohmann, 1896
- Fritillaria haplostoma Fol, 1872
- Fritillaria helenae Bückmann, 1924
- Fritillaria lucifer Hopcroft & Robison, 2005
- Fritillaria megachile Fol, 1872
- Fritillaria messanensis Lohmann in Bückmann, 1924
- Fritillaria pacifica Tokioka, 1958
- Fritillaria pellucida (Busch, 1851)
- Fritillaria polaris Bernstein, 1934
- Fritillaria ragusina Garić & Batistić, 2010
- Fritillaria rex Hopcroft & Robison, 2005
- Fritillaria tenella Lohmann, 1896
- Fritillaria urticans Fol, 1872
- Fritillaria venusta Lohmann, 1896
