= Kowalevskia =

Scientific classification
- Kingdom: Animalia
- Phylum: Chordata
- Subphylum: Tunicata
- Class: Appendicularia
- Order: Copelata
- Family: Kowalevskiidae; Lahille, 1888
- Genus: Kowalevskia; Fol, 1872

Synonyms
- Kowalewskia Fol, 1872

Larvacean genus

Kowalevskia is a genus of larvacean tunicates, the only one in the family Kowalevskiidae.

== Species ==
- Kowalevskia oceanica Lohmann, 1899
- Kowalevskia tenuis Fol, 1872

== Description ==
Kowalevskia is a small larvacean. In the adult, the body measures around 1 mm long, while the tail is 8 mm long, appearing stretched and tapered at its ends.

Unlike other Appendicularia species, Kowalevskia doesn't have a heart. Instead, the circulatory system is powered by the beating tail.

Kowalevskia also lacks an endostyle, being replaced by a ciliated groove without glandular cells.

The spiracles also differ from other families, being shaped as long, narrow slits.

=== House ===
Uniquely among larvaceans, Kowalevskia's house is ellipsoidal or toroidal in shape, 1 to 2 cm in diameter. It has a single opening, acting both as inlet and outlet.

== Distribution ==
Both species of Kowalevskia have a wide distribution. K. tenuis can be found in the East Atlantic and West Pacific, as well as in the Mediterranean and Black Seas. Meanwhile, K. oceanica is found in the Mediterranean and North-East Atlantic, as well as in the Red Sea and West Indian Ocean.

== Phylogeny ==
The monotypic Kowalevskiidae is believed to be the sister taxon to Fritillariidae, with both sharing specialized characteristics and forming a clade to the exclusion of Oikopleuridae.
