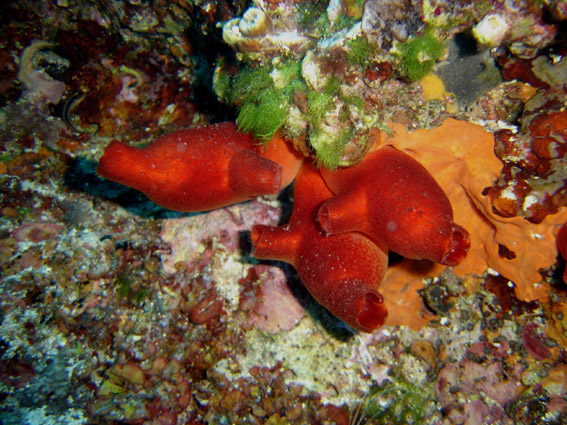
- Halocynthia papillosa, a solitary stolidobranch ascidian

Scientific classification
- Kingdom: Animalia
- Phylum: Chordata
- Subphylum: Tunicata
- Clade: Acopa; Haeckel, 1896

Subgroups
- Class Thaliacea; Order Enterogona; Order Stolidobranchia; (Note: Enterogona and Stolidobranchia form the paraphyletic class Ascidiacea)

= Acopa (tunicate) =

Clade of marine chordates

Acopa is a clade of marine tunicates comprising the traditional classes Ascidiacea (sea squirts) and Thaliacea (salps, doliolids, and pyrosomes). First proposed by Ernst Haeckel in 1896, the clade encompasses over 3,000 described species characterized by the resorption of the larval tail and notochord during metamorphosis, distinguishing them from their sister group, Appendicularia (larvaceans), which retain the larval tail throughout adulthood. Members of Acopa inhabit marine ecosystems worldwide, ranging from shallow intertidal rocks and coral reefs to the open ocean and abyssal depths.

== Etymology ==
The name Acopa derives from the Ancient Greek a- ("without") and kōpē ("oar" or "handle"), referring to the absence of a locomotory tail in the adult stage. Haeckel introduced the taxon in 1896 in contrast to Copelata (a synonym of Appendicularia) to group ascidians and thaliaceans together based on their shared adult morphology and metamorphic development.

== Anatomy and physiology ==
Adults may be solitary individuals or colonial organisms composed of numerous genetically identical zooids embedded in a common matrix, ranging in size from a few millimeters to pelagic colonies exceeding several meters in length. The body is enclosed in a permanent, protective outer tunic secreted by the underlying epidermis. This tunic consists of structural proteins and tunicin, a cellulose-like polysaccharide rarely produced by animals, which provides structural rigidity and protection against predators.

All members of the clade are suspension feeders (with the exception of a few deep-sea macrophagous species) that rely on an enlarged pharynx modified into a perforated branchial sac. Water is drawn into the body through an oral (incurrent) siphon, passes through numerous ciliated gill slits (stigmata) lining the pharynx, and exits through an atrial (excurrent) siphon. Along the ventral floor of the pharynx lies the endostyle, a ciliated groove homologous to the vertebrate thyroid gland that secretes a continuous mucus net. As water passes through the stigmata, planktonic food particles are trapped in the mucus sheet, rolled into a cord by dorsal cilia, and passed into a U-shaped digestive tract consisting of an esophagus, stomach, and intestine that empties into the atrial cavity. In benthic, sessile ascidians anchored to rocky substrates, shells, or sediment, both siphons are typically oriented upward toward the water column. In the secondarily pelagic and planktonic thaliaceans, the siphons are positioned at opposite ends of a barrel-shaped body, allowing water propelled by circumferential muscle bands to serve simultaneously for filter feeding, respiration, and jet propulsion.

The circulatory system is partially open, consisting of a ventral tubular heart enclosed in a pericardium and connected to blood vessels and haemocoelic sinuses that extend into the tunic. A distinctive physiological trait of the clade is peristaltic heart reversal, in which the tubular heart periodically stops and reverses the direction of its contractions every few minutes, alternating blood flow between the branchial basket and the visceral organs. The blood of many species contains specialized cells (vanadocytes) capable of accumulating high concentrations of vanadium or iron from seawater. In the adult stage, the central nervous system is reduced to a single cerebral ganglion located within the connective tissue between the oral and atrial siphons, paired with an adjacent neural gland. Nerves radiate from this ganglion to innervate the siphon sphincters, body wall musculature, and branchial basket.

== Life cycle and reproduction ==
Nearly all species within Acopa are hermaphroditic, possessing both ovaries and testes, although self-fertilization is frequently prevented by chemical blocks or asynchronous gamete release. Solitary species typically reproduce strictly sexually via broadcast spawning, whereas colonial ascidians and thaliaceans are generally ovoviviparous, brooding embryos internally prior to release.

Embryonic development produces a free-swimming, non-feeding (lecithotrophic) tadpole larva equipped with a dorsal nerve cord, a muscular tail supported by a turgid notochord, and a sensory vesicle containing a light-sensitive ocellus and a gravity-sensing statolith. This larval stage lasts from a few hours to a few days and serves primarily for habitat selection and dispersal. Upon settling on a suitable substrate, or transitioning directly in the water column in thaliaceans, the larva undergoes radical metamorphosis. During this process, the tail, notochord, and larval sensory vesicle are resorbed through phagocytosis, the internal organs rotate by up to 90 degrees, and the branchial sac expands into its functional adult form.

In addition to sexual reproduction, colonial ascidians and all thaliaceans exhibit asexual reproduction through budding (blastogenesis). In thaliaceans such as salps and doliolids, the life cycle obligately alternates between a solitary asexual generation (oozooid) that buds long chains of clones, and a colonial sexual generation (blastozooid) that produces gametes.

== Phylogeny ==
Historically, tunicates were classified into three distinct classes: Ascidiacea, Thaliacea, and Appendicularia. Subsequent molecular and phylogenomic studies have consistently recovered Acopa as a monophyletic group sister to Appendicularia at the base of Tunicata.
