= Mesochordaeus =

Scientific classification
- Domain: Eukaryota
- Kingdom: Animalia
- Phylum: Chordata
- Subphylum: Tunicata
- Class: Appendicularia
- Order: Copelata
- Family: Oikopleuridae
- Subfamily: Bathochordaeinae
- Genus: Mesochordaeus; Fenaux & Youngbluth, 1990

Species
- Mesochordaeus bahamasi Fenaux & Youngbluth, 1990; Mesochordaeus erythrocephalus Hopcroft & Robison, 1997

Genus of larvacean

Mesochordaeus is a genus of oikopleurid larvacean, related to Bathochordaeus.

== Description ==
Mesochordaeus is a comparatively large larvacean, with a tail length reaching up to 50 mm (2.0 in). The genus is characterized by its large spiracles.

== Distribution ==
Two species are known. Mesochordaeus bahamasi has been reported in the Atlantic Ocean near the Bahamas, while Mesochordaeus erythrocephalus has been found in Monterey Bay, California, sharing this habitat with its relative Bathochordaeus.
