= Althoffia =

Scientific classification
- Domain: Eukaryota
- Kingdom: Animalia
- Phylum: Chordata
- Subphylum: Tunicata
- Class: Appendicularia
- Order: Copelata
- Family: Oikopleuridae
- Subfamily: Oikopleurinae
- Tribe: Alabiata
- Genus: Althoffia; Lohmann, 1892
- Species: A. tumida

Binomial name
- Althoffia tumida Lohmann, 1892

Genus of tunicates

Althoffia is a monotypic genus of larvacean tunicates belonging to the family Oikopleuridae. The only species is Althoffia tumida.

== Distribution ==
The species is distributed in the Atlantic, Pacific and Indian Oceans. It has been found at depths of less than 20 meters, in waters ranging from 15.8 °C (60.4 °F) to 27 °C (81 °F).
