= Folia (tunicate) =

Scientific classification
- Domain: Eukaryota
- Kingdom: Animalia
- Phylum: Chordata
- Subphylum: Tunicata
- Class: Appendicularia
- Order: Copelata
- Family: Oikopleuridae
- Subfamily: Oikopleurinae
- Tribe: Labiata
- Genus: Folia; Lohmann, 1892

Species
- Folia gracilis Lohmann, 1892; Folia mediterranea (Lohmann, 1899)

Genus of tunicates

Folia is a genus of larvacean tunicates in the family Oikopleuridae.
