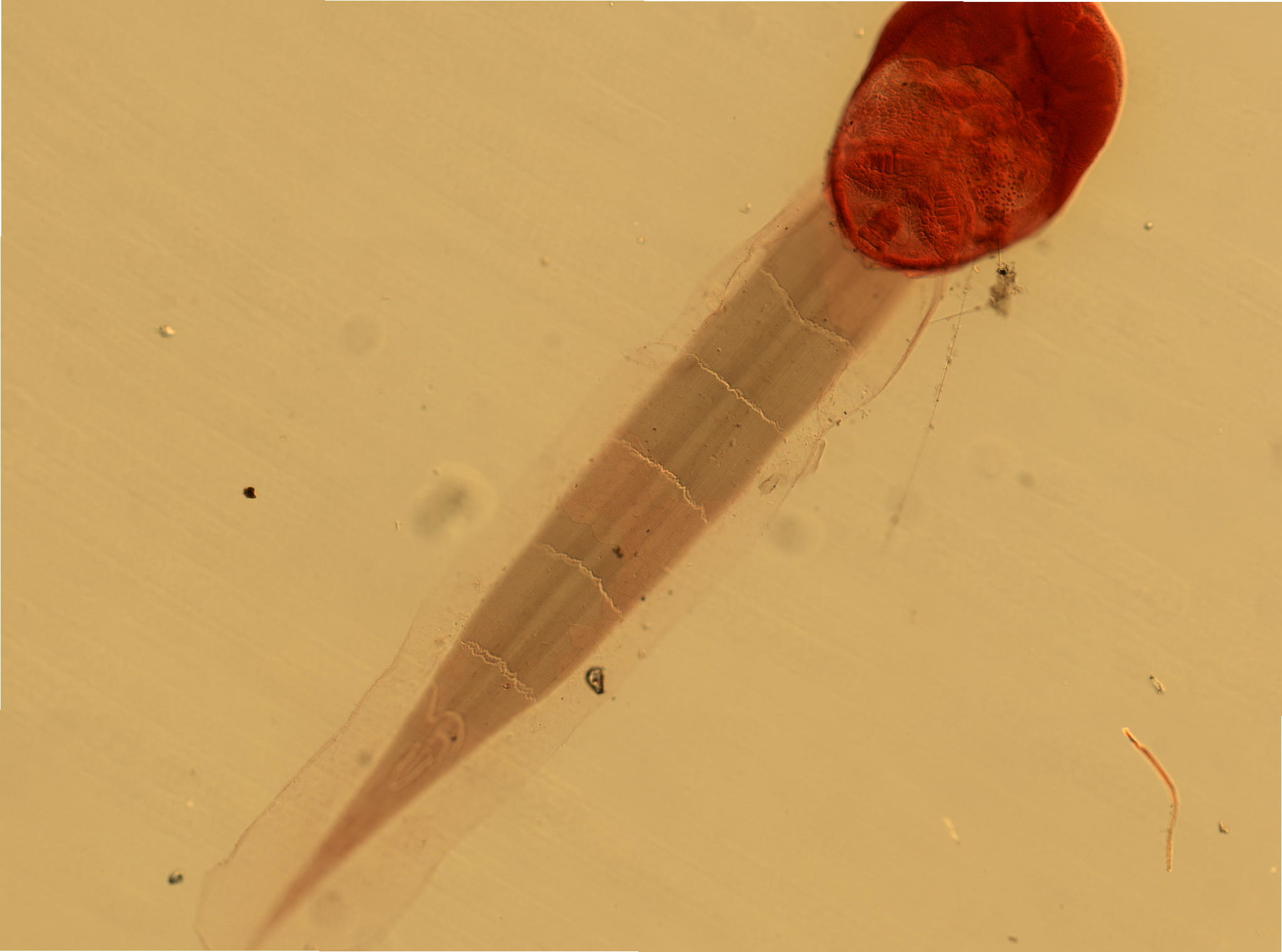
- Appendicularia sp. specimen

Scientific classification
- Domain: Eukaryota
- Kingdom: Animalia
- Phylum: Chordata
- Subphylum: Tunicata
- Class: Appendicularia
- Order: Copelata
- Family: Fritillariidae
- Subfamily: Appendiculariinae; Seeliger, 1895
- Genus: Appendicularia; Fol, 1874

Type species
- Appendicularia sicula Fol, 1874

Species
- Appendicularia sicula Fol, 1874; Appendicularia tregouboffi Fenaux, 1960

Synonyms
- Appendicula Bartsch, 1915

= Appendicularia (animal genus) =

Genus of tunicates in the family Fritillariidae

Appendicularia is a genus of larvaceans in the family Fritillariidae.

== History ==
The genus name Appendicularia was originally coined by Chamisso and Eysenhardt in 1821, naming the first discovered larvacean Appendicularia flagellum. However, the lack of an accurate description made it a nomen nudum, leading to it being reused by Hermann Fol for the species Appendicularia sicula.

== Description ==
Appendicularia is relatively small in comparison to other larvaceans, with an adult body length of around 0.4 mm and a tail length of around 1.1 mm in A. sicula. The body is flattened in its front half, and bulged in its posterior half. The house is ellipsoidal, measuring around 2.6 mm in length.

== Distribution ==
The first description of Appendicularia sicula was made from specimens found near Messina, Italy. Since then, it has also been found in low-depth waters near the coasts of the Japanese islands of Kyushu and Hokkaido.
