= Megalocercus =

Scientific classification
- Domain: Eukaryota
- Kingdom: Animalia
- Phylum: Chordata
- Subphylum: Tunicata
- Class: Appendicularia
- Order: Copelata
- Family: Oikopleuridae
- Subfamily: Oikopleurinae
- Tribe: Labiata
- Genus: Megalocercus; Chun, 1887

Genus of tunicates

Megalocercus is a genus of larvacean tunicates belonging to the family Oikopleuridae.

The species of this genus are found in Pacific Ocean.

Species:

- Megalocercus abyssorum Chun, 1887
- Megalocercus huxleyi Ritter, 1905
