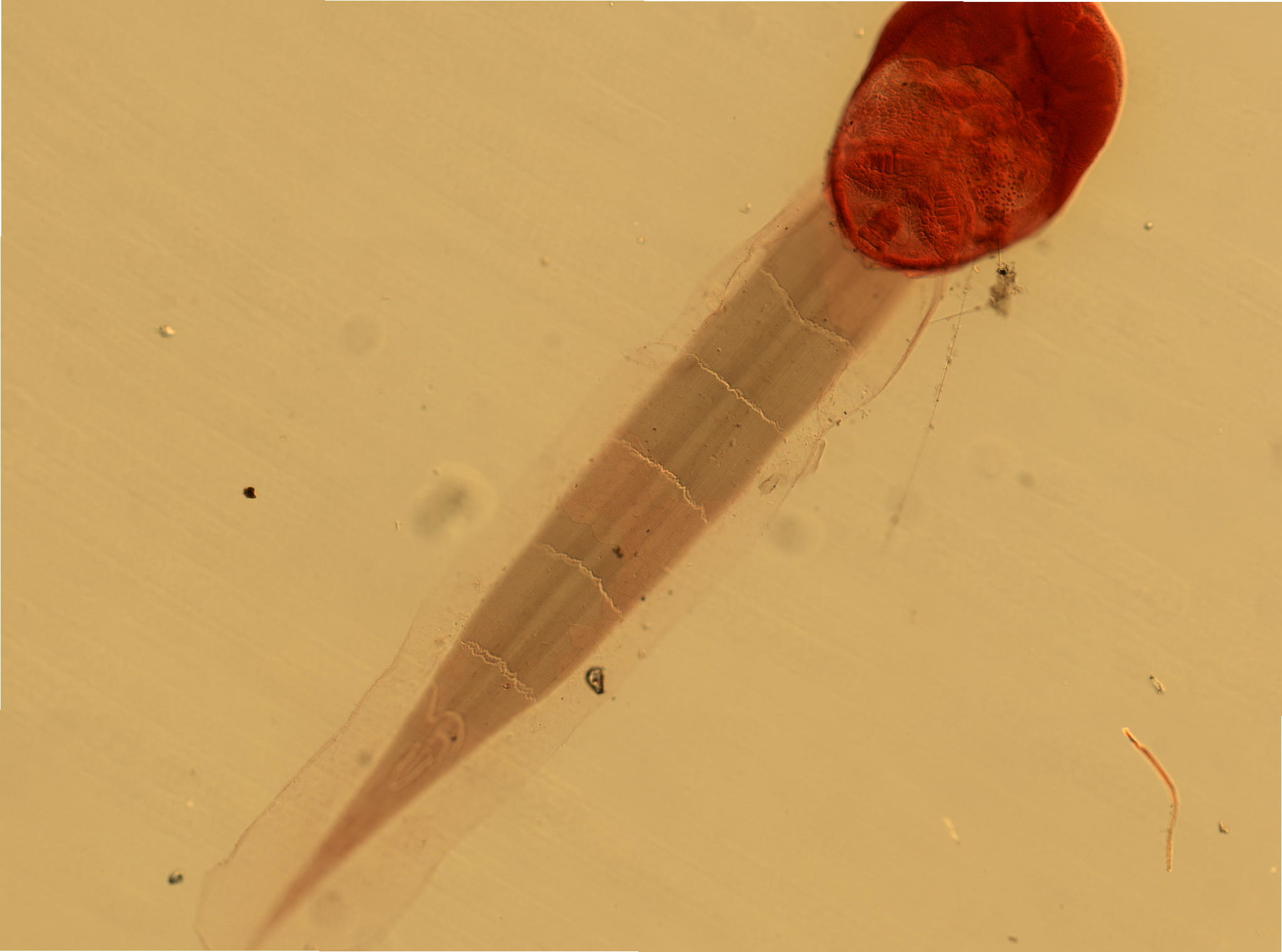
- Appendicularia sp. specimen

Scientific classification
- Kingdom: Animalia
- Phylum: Chordata
- Subphylum: Tunicata
- Class: Appendicularia
- Order: Copelata
- Family: Fritillariidae; Lohmann, 1915

= Fritillariidae =

Family of marine organisms belonging in the subphylum Tunicata

Fritillariidae is a family of tunicates belonging to the order Copelata.

== Genera ==
Fritillariidae comprises three genera, divided into two subfamilies. While the trunk anatomy differs between the genera, they share a similar arrangement of house-producing cells (oikoplasts) over the midline of the pharyngeal trunk, distinguishing them from the Oikopleuridae.

- Appendiculariinae Seeliger, 1895
  - Appendicularia Fol, 1874
- Fritillariinae Seeliger, 1895
  - Fritillaria Fol, 1872
  - Tectillaria Lohmann, 1926
