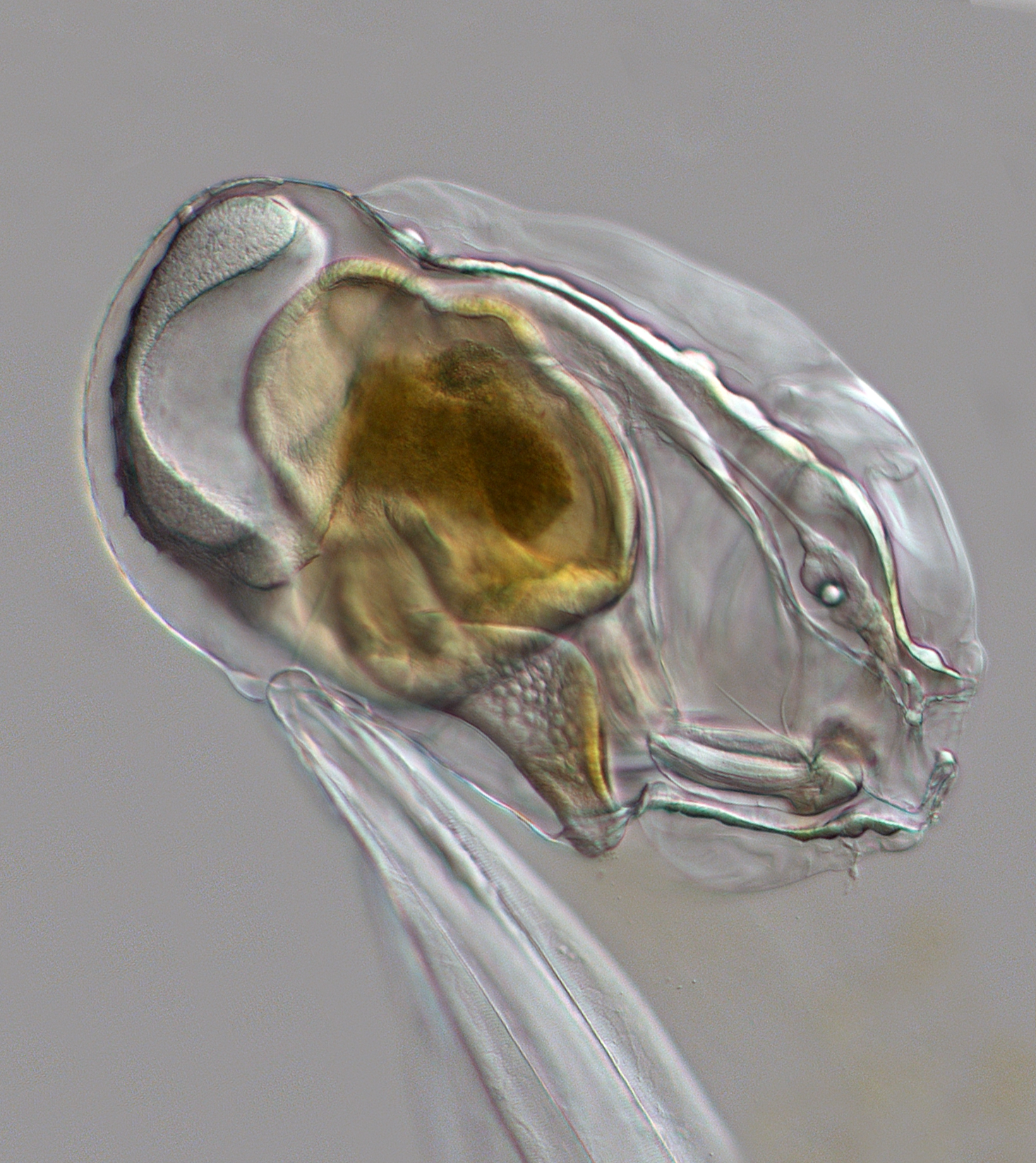
- Oikopleura dioica

Scientific classification
- Kingdom: Animalia
- Phylum: Chordata
- Subphylum: Tunicata
- Class: Appendicularia
- Order: Copelata
- Family: Oikopleuridae
- Genus: Oikopleura
- Species: O. dioica

Binomial name
- Oikopleura dioica Fol, 1872

Synonyms
- Appendicularia coerulescens Gegenbaur, 1855; Oikopleura flabellum Traustedt, 1880; Oikopleura malmii Hartmann, 1878; Vexillaria flabellum Müller, 1846; Vexillaria speciosa Eisen, 1874

= Oikopleura dioica =

Species of tunicate

Oikopleura dioica is a species of small pelagic tunicate found in the surface waters of most of the world's oceans. It is used as a model organism in research into developmental biology.

== Description ==
Oikopleura dioica is a bioluminescent species. Like other Oikopleuridans, O. dioica have a discrete body and tail as adults and retain their notochord throughout life. They resemble tadpoles in appearance with a body typically between 0.5 and 1 mm (0.02 and 0.04 in) long and a tail about four times that length.

Its body is ovoid and the tail slender. There are two sub-chordal cells outside the central core of muscle in the tail, which are easily observable some half to two thirds of the way down the length of the tail. The mouth has a small lower lip and the buccal glands are small and globular. The endostyle is large, extending nearly as far as the anus. The right lobe of the stomach forms a sac behind the entrance to the intestine. O. dioica sexes are separate, unlike in all other known appendicularians, and the ovary or testes are at the rear of the body.

== Distribution ==
Oikopleura dioica is widely distributed over the continental shelf in tropical and temperate waters in all the world's oceans. It is very abundant in surface waters but in colder seas is replaced by Oikopleura vanhoeffeni and Oikopleura labradoriensis.

== Behaviour ==
Every three or four hours, Oikopleura dioica creates a mucus net "house" which surrounds its body. Water is pumped through this house and minute food particles are filtered out of the water and then transferred into the mouth. Once the gelatinous net "houses" are too clogged to allow further filtration, they are then abandoned and drift down through the water to the seabed as "marine snow".

== Use in research ==
Oikopleura dioica is used as a model organism, a role for which it has several features to recommend it. It has the typical chordate body plan, it is simple to keep and breed in the laboratory, it produces large numbers of eggs and the generation time is only four days at 20 °C (68 °F). The body is also transparent, making it easier to study, and at hatching only consists of 550 cells. The genome has been sequenced and contains about 15,000 genes, approximately half the number occurring in vertebrates. All central Hox genes have been lost. Comparison of the genome with that of other chordates will help identify the genes which appeared early in the vertebrate lineage. Examination of intraspecific genomic variation has revealed extreme genome scrambling, despite the lack of morphological variation accompanying such vast genomic variation.

In the Sars International Centre for Marine Molecular Biology, inbred lines have been developed using repeated matings of closely related individuals. The molecular base of a number of aspects of vertebrate development is identical in these simple chordates and in higher vertebrates. As an example, the brachyury gene and the homolog of the PAX2 gene both play a similar role in the development of tunicates as they do in vertebrates. Complex aspects of vertebral development such as the differentiation of the central nervous system can thus be studied in the laboratory.
