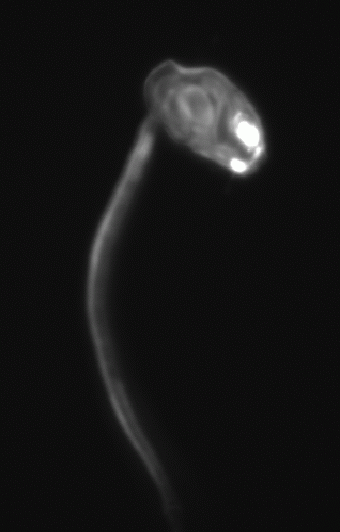
- Oikopleura dioica

Scientific classification
- Kingdom: Animalia
- Phylum: Chordata
- Subphylum: Tunicata
- Class: Appendicularia
- Order: Copelata
- Family: Oikopleuridae; Lahille, 1887

Subfamilies, tribes and genera
- Bathochordaeinae Lohmann, 1915; Bathochordaeus Chun, 1900; Mesochordaeus Fenaux & Youngbluth, 1990; Oikopleurinae Lohmann, 1896; Alabiata Fenaux, 1993; Althoffia Lohmann, 1892; Mesoikopleura Fenaux, 1993; Pelagopleura Lohmann, 1926; Sinisteroffia Tokioka, 1957; Labiata Fenaux, 1993; Chunopleura Lohmann, 1914; Folia Lohmann, 1892; Megalocercus Chun, 1887; Oikopleura Mertens, 1830; Stegosoma Chun, 1887

= Oikopleuridae =

Family of tunicates

Oikopleuridae is a family of larvacean tunicates. A comparatively species-rich family, it has been especially well-researched thanks to the ubiquity of Oikopleura dioica as a model species. It comprises two subfamilies, Bathochordaeinae and Oikopleurinae, itself divided into the tribes Alabiata and Labiata.

It is believed to be sister to the clade formed by the two other families (Fritillariidae and Kowalevskiidae), united by common derived characteristics lacking in Oikopleuridae.
