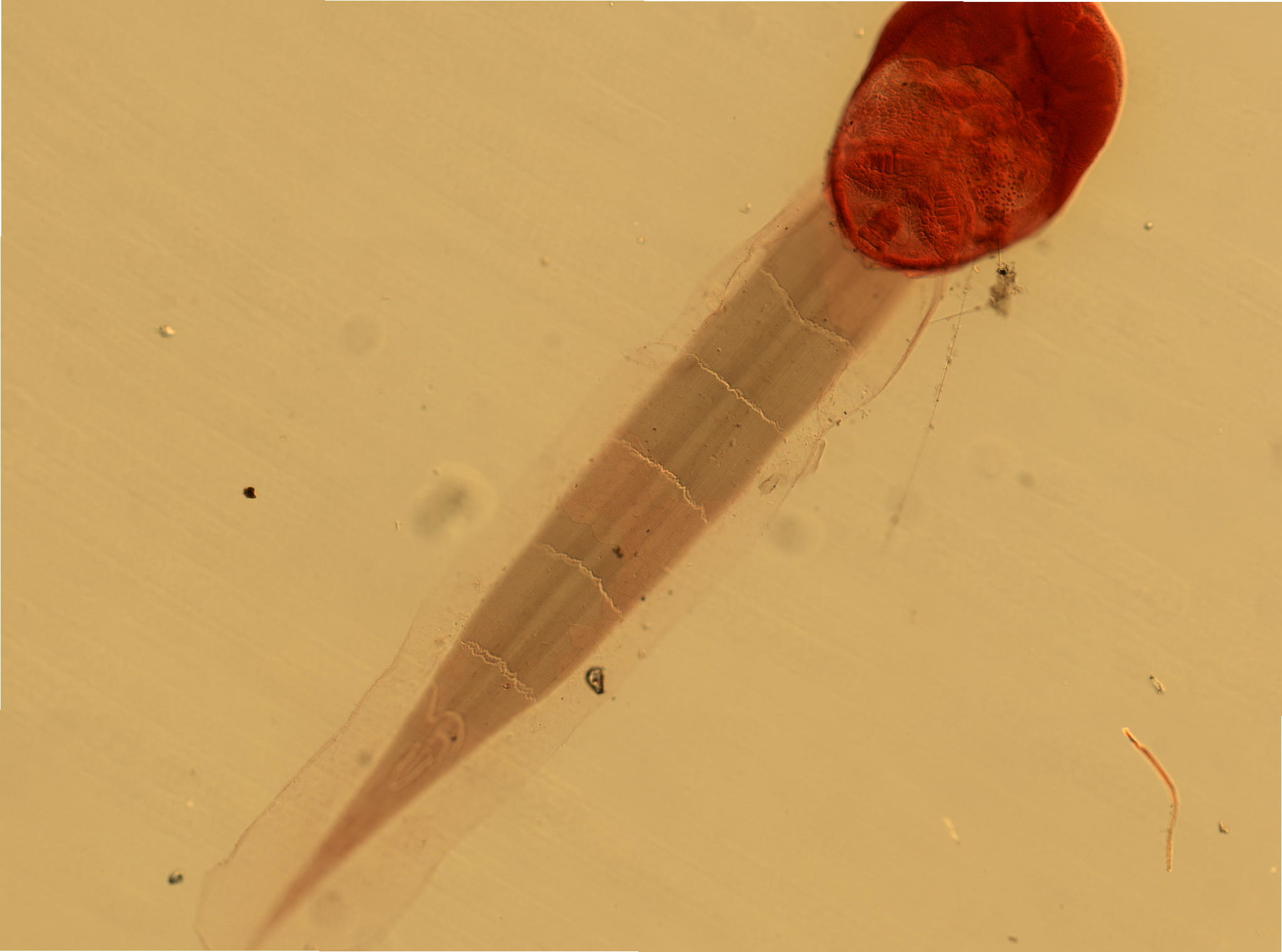
- Appendicularia sp., a genus of fritillariid larvacean
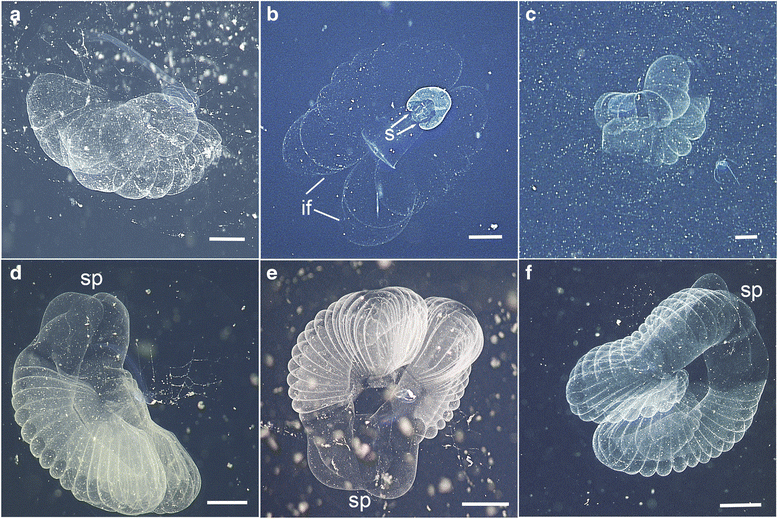
- Houses of Bathochordaeus charon (top) and B. stygius (bottom), two species of giant larvacean

Scientific classification
- Kingdom: Animalia
- Phylum: Chordata
- Subphylum: Tunicata
- Class: Appendicularia; Fol, 1872
- Order: Copelata; Haeckel, 1866

Families and genera
- †Vetulicolia? Shu et al, 2002; Kowalevskiidae Lahille, 1888; Kowalevskia Fol, 1872; Fritillariidae Lohmann, 1915; Appendiculariinae Seeliger, 1895; Appendicularia Fol, 1874; Fritillariinae Seeliger, 1895; Tectillaria Lohmann & Buckman, 1926; Fritillaria Fol, 1872; Oikopleuridae Lohmann, 1896; Bathochordaeinae Lohmann, 1915; Bathochordaeus Chun, 1900; Mesochordaeus Fenaux & Youngbluth, 1990; Oikopleurinae Lohmann, 1896; Alabiata Fenaux, 1993; Althoffia Lohmann, 1892; Mesoikopleura Fenaux, 1993; Pelagopleura Lohmann, 1926; Sinisteroffia Tokioka, 1957; Labiata Fenaux, 1993; Chunopleura Lohmann, 1914; Folia Lohmann, 1892; Megalocercus Chun, 1887; Oikopleura Mertens, 1830; Stegosoma Chun, 1887

Synonyms
- Larvacea Herdman, 1882; Perennichordata Balfour, 1881

= Larvacean =

Appendicularia

Class of marine animals in the subphylum Tunicata

Larvaceans, copelates or appendicularians, class Appendicularia, are solitary, free-swimming tunicates found throughout the world's oceans. While larvaceans are filter feeders like most other tunicates, they keep their tadpole-like shape as adults, with the notochord running through the tail. They can be found in the pelagic zone, specifically in the photic zone, or sometimes deeper. They are transparent planktonic animals, usually ranging from 2 mm (0.079 in) to 8 mm (0.31 in) in body length including the tail, although giant larvaceans can reach up to 10 cm (3.9 in) in length.

Larvaceans are known for the large houses they build around their bodies to assist in filter-feeding. Secreted from mucus and cellulose, these structures often comprise several layers of filters and can reach up to ten times their body length. In some genera like Oikopleura, houses are built and discarded every few hours, with sinking houses playing a key role in the oceanic carbon cycle.

== History ==
The study of larvaceans began with the description of Appendicularia flagellum by Chamisso and Eysenhardt in 1821. (Note: This first description would later be considered insufficient, leading to Appendicularia becoming a nomen nudum until its reuse by Fol in 1874 under its modern definition.) More species were quickly discovered, with Oikopleura in 1830 providing the first evidence of the larvacean house, although its role in feeding wouldn't be understood until Eisen's discoveries in 1874.

=== Larvaceans as tunicates ===
Huxley was the first to suggest the identity of larvaceans as tunicates in 1851. Their relationship with other tunicates remained unclear, with larvaceans being argued to be ascidian larvae or a free-swimming generation of ascidians.

An attempt at establishing the internal phylogeny of the class was realized by Fol following the discovery of the aberrant Kowalevskia. Fol grouped together the families Oikopleuridae and Fritillariidae in the putative Endostyla, based on the presence of an endostyle, absent in Kowalevskia which he placed in the sister group Anendostyla.

=== In situ observations ===
Another jump in the study of larvaceans was the beginning of in situ observations, which allowed researchers to study the creatures inside their fragile houses without damage. Researchers such as Kakani Katija Young from the Monterey Bay Aquarium Research Institute pioneered imaging techniques such as the particle image velocimetry instrument DeepPIV, revealing the complexity and inner structure of larvacean houses and leading to the first 3D simulations of their internal currents.

== Anatomy ==
The adult larvaceans resemble the tadpole-like larvae of most tunicates. Like a common tunicate larva, the adult Appendicularia have a discrete trunk and tail. It was originally believed that larvaceans were neotenic tunicates, giving them their common name. Recent studies hint at an earlier divergence, with ascidians having developed their sessile adult form later on.

As the larvae of ascidian tunicates don't feed at all, the larvae of doliolids goes through their metamorphosis while still inside the egg, and salps and pyrosomes have both lost the larval stage, it makes the larvaceans the only tunicates that feed and have fully functional internal organs during their tailed "tadpole stage", which in Appendicularia is permanent.

The full development of Oikopleura dioica and the fate of its cell lineages have been well-documented, providing insight into larvacean anatomy. Being a model organism, most of our knowledge on larvaceans comes from this specific taxon. Variations in body shape and anatomy exist between families, although the general body plan stays similar.

=== Trunk ===
The trunk can roughly be divided into three regions — pharyngeo-brachial, digestive and genital — which are more or less distinct depending on the genus. Like in vertebrates, the digestive system comprises in order a mouth, pharynx, oesophagus, stomach, intestine and rectum.

The pharynx is equipped with an endostyle on its lower side, a specialized organ helping direct food particles inside. It also possesses two spiracles, each surrounded by a ring of cilia, which direct food particles from the inner filter's junction to the mouth.

In some genera like Oikopleura, the tract is U-shaped, with the anus located in a forwards position compared to the stomach and intestine. Others like Fritillaria present a more segmented appearance, with a straighter digestive tract and well-separated pharyngeal and digestive sections. The species Appendicularia sicula doesn't have any anus at all, leading to accumulation of undigested material.

Appendicularia retains the ancestral chordate characteristics of having the pharyngeal spiracles and the anus open directly to the outside, and by the lack of the atrium and the atrial siphon found in related classes.

The gonads are located in the posterior section of the trunk, beyond the digestive tract. They are the only section of the body not to be well-distinguished in the juvenile post-tail shift, instead only growing in size in the days leading to spawning.

=== Tail ===
The tail of larvaceans contain a central notochord, a dorsal nerve cord, and a series of striated muscle bands enveloped either by epithelial tissue (oikopleurids) or by an acellular basement membrane (fritillarids). Unlike the ascidian larvae, the tail nerve cord in larvaceans contains some neurons.

The tail twists during development, with its dorsal and ventral sides becoming left and right sides respectively. In this way, the dorsal nerve cord actually runs through the tail to the left of the notochord, connecting to the rest of the nervous system at the caudal ganglion at the base of the tail.

The muscle bands surrounding the notochord and nerve cord consist of rows of paired muscle cells, or myocytes, running along the length of the tail.

=== House ===
To assist in their filter-feeding, larvaceans produce a test or "house" made of mucopolysaccharides and cellulose, secreted from specialized cells termed oikoplasts. In most species, the house surrounds the animal like a bubble. Even for species in which the house does not completely surround the body, such as Fritillaria, the house is always present and attached to at least one surface.

The house is secreted from oikoplasts, a specialized family of cells constituting the oikoplastic epithelium. Derived from the ectoderm, it covers part (in Fritillaria) or all (in Oikopleura) of the trunk. In larvae, surface fibrils are secreted by the epithelium prior to the differentiation of the oikoplasts, and have been suggested to play a part in the development of the first house, as well as the formation of the cuticular layer.

The houses possesses several sets of filters, with external filters stopping food particles too big for the larvacean to eat, and internal filters redirecting edible particles to the larvacean's mouth. Including the external filters, the houses can reach over one meter in giant larvaceans, an order of magnitude larger than the larvacean itself. The house varies in shape: incomplete in Fritillaria, it is shaped like a pair of kidneys in Bathochordaeus, and toroidal in Kowalevskia.

The arrangement of filters allows food in the surrounding water to be brought in and concentrated prior to feeding, with some species able to concentrate food up to 1000 times compared to the surrounding water. By regularly beating the tail, the larvacean can generate water currents within its house that allow the concentration of food. For this purpose, the tail fits into a specialized tail sheath, a funnel of the house connected to the exhalent aperture. The high efficiency of this method allows larvaceans to feed on much smaller nanoplankton than most other filter feeders.

This specific niche of "mucous-mesh grazers" or "mammoth grazers" has been argued to be shared with thaliaceans (salps, pyrosomes and doliolids) — all using internal mucous structures —, as well as with sea butterflies, a clade of pelagic sea snails similarly using an external mucous web to catch prey, although through passive "flux feeding" rather than active filter-feeding.

Larvaceans have been found to be able to select food particles based on factors such as nutrient availability and toxin presence, although both laboratory feeding experiments and in situ observations show no difference in feeding rate between their usual food sources and microplastics. They can eat a wide range of particles sizes, down to one ten-thousandth of their own body size, far smaller than other filter-feeders of comparable size. On the other side of the spectrum, Oikopleura dioica can eat prey up to 20% of its body size. The upper limit on prey size is set by the mouth size, which in the largest genus Bathochordaeus is around 1–2 mm wide for a trunk length of 1–3 cm.

In some species, houses are discarded and replaced regularly as the animal grows in size and its filters become clogged; in Oikopleura, a house is kept for no more than four hours before being replaced. In other genera such as Fritillaria, houses can be regularly deflated and inflated, cleaning off particles clogging the filters. Houses being reused in this manner leads to a smaller contribution in marine snow from these genera.

Larvacean houses share key homologies with tunicate tunics, including the use of cellulose as a material, confirming that the ancestral tunicate already had the capability to synthesize cellulose. This has been confirmed through genetic studies on Oikopleura dioica and the ascidian Ciona, pinpointing their common cellulose synthase genes as originating with a horizontal gene transfer from a prokaryote. However, houses and tunics share key differences — while houses are gelatinous and can be deflated or even discarded at will, tunics are rigid structures definitively incorporated into the animal's filter-feeding apparatus.

== Ecology ==
=== Habitat ===
Larvaceans are widespread, motile planktonic creatures, living through the water column. As their habitats are mostly defined by ocean currents, many species have a cosmopolitan distribution, with some like Oikopleura dioica being found in all of the world's oceans. Larvaceans have been reported as far as the Southern Ocean, where they are estimated to comprise 10.5 million tonnes of wet biomass.

Most species live in the photic zone at less than 100 meters in depth, although giant larvaceans such as Bathochordaeus mcnutti can be found up to 1,400 meters deep, and undescribed oikopleurid and fritillariid species have been reported through the bathypelagic zone, down to the 3,500 meters deep seafloor in Monterey Bay where they constitute the dominant particle feeders in most of the water column.

=== Reproduction and life cycle ===
Larvaceans reproduce sexually, with all but one species being protandric hermaphrodites. Unlike all other known larvaceans, Oikopleura dioica shows separate sexes, which are distinguished on the last day of their life cycle through differing gonad shapes.

The immature animals resemble the tadpole larvae of ascidians, albeit with the addition of developing viscera. Once the trunk is fully developed, the larva undergoes "tail shift", in which the tail moves from a rearward position to a ventral orientation and twists 90° relative to the trunk. Following tail shift, the larvacean begins secretion of the first house.

The life cycle is short. The tadpole-shaped larva usually performs the tail shift less than one day after fecundation, becoming fully functional juveniles. Adults usually reproduce after 5 to 7 days depending on the species.

Fertilisation is external. The body wall ruptures during egg release, killing the animal.

=== Ecological impact ===
Through their discarded, nutrient-rich houses — termed sinkers — and fecal pellets falling towards the deep seafloor, larvaceans transport large amounts of organic matter towards that region, constituting a significant component of marine snow. In that way, they massively contribute to the oceanic carbon cycle, being responsible for up to one-third of the carbon transfer to the deep seafloor in Monterey Bay. Still in Monterey Bay, giant larvaceans have been found to have the highest filtration rate of any invertebrate, and discarded larvacean houses have been observed as a consistent food source for both pelagic and benthic organisms in that same region.

Both larvacean houses and fecal pellets were also found to trap microplastics, before sinking towards the seafloor. In this way, larvaceans are believed to play a part in the missing plastic paradox, transporting microplastics through the water column and to the seafloor. Experiments performed on the giant larvacean Bathochordaeus stygius confirm their ability to filter and discard microplastics.

== Taxonomy ==
Appendicularia is most often recovered as the sister group of the other tunicate groups (Ascidiacea and Thaliacea). Already in the late 19th to early 20th century, it was hypothesized by Seeliger and later by Lohmann that Appendicularia diverged first from a free-swimming ancestral tunicate, with sessile forms evolving later in the sister lineage (often termed Acopa).

The following cladogram is based on the 2018 phylogenomic study of Delsuc and colleagues.

- Tunicata
  - Appendicularia
  - - - Thaliacea
      - - Phlebobranchia
        - Aplousobranchia
    - Stolidobranchia

=== Fossil record ===
Being delicate and soft-bodied, Appendicularia has no definitive fossil record, although the Cambrian form Oesia disjuncta has historically been suggested to belong to the class. More recently, microfossils covered in an organic coat found in vanadium-rich Cambrian black shales in South China have been suggested to be traces of early larvaceans in their houses, putatively termed "paleoappendicularians". The genus "Palaeoikopleuria" has also been recorded as an early larvacean, however this fossil has not been mentioned in any papers after its description.

Vetulicolians have also been argued to represent stem-group larvaceans by Dominguez and Jefferies, on the basis of synapomorphies comprising the reduction of the atria and of the gill slits, the position of the anus, and a 90° counter-clockwise torsion of the tail (as seen from behind) around the anterior-posterior axis.

=== Internal classification ===
The extant species of the class are divided into three families based on both morphological and genomic criteria: Kowalevskiidae, Fritillariidae and Oikopleuridae. The first two are believed to be closer to each other, sharing more derived characteristics compared to the primitive Oikopleuridae. Fritillariidae itself is subdivided into Fritillariinae and the monotypic Appendiculariinae, while Oikopleuridae is split into Bathochordaeinae and Oikopleurinae. Deeper phylogeny is unclear, with genera such as Oikopleura possibly being paraphyletic.

- Appendicularia
  - - Kowalevskiidae
    - Fritillariidae
      - Fritillariinae
      - Appendiculariinae
  - - Oikopleuridae
      - Bathochordaeinae
      - Oikopleurinae

Several key morphological differences distinguish the families. Fritillariidae presents a more tapered, compressed trunk, as compared to the rounder one of the other two families. Meanwhile, Kowalevskiidae is notable for lacking the heart and endostyle present in other families, the latter replaced by a ciliated groove without glandular cells. The shape of the spiracles also differs: they appear as simple holes in Fritillariidae, long narrow slits in Kowalevskiidae, and tubular passages in Oikopleuridae.

While the number of described species is comparatively low, the class is believed to harbour massive diversity in the form of cryptic species. For instance, Oikopleura dioica comprises at least three distinct, reproductively incompatible clades despite a similar morphological appearance.

Not all species are equally well-studied. The popularity of Oikopleura dioica as a model organism and its ease of cultivation have led to studies disproportionately focusing on this species' anatomy, and in situ observations on Bathochordaeus charon have been performed by the Monterey Bay Aquarium Research Institute. Meanwhile, studies of Kowalevskiidae and Fritillariidae are comparatively rarer and more limited.

== Use as a model species ==
The dioecious Oikopleura dioica is the only larvacean species that has successfully been cultured in laboratory. The ease of cultivation, combined with extremely small genome size and recent development of techniques for expressing foreign genes in O. dioica, has led to the advancement of this species as a model organism for the study of gene regulation, chordate evolution, developmental biology, and ecology.
