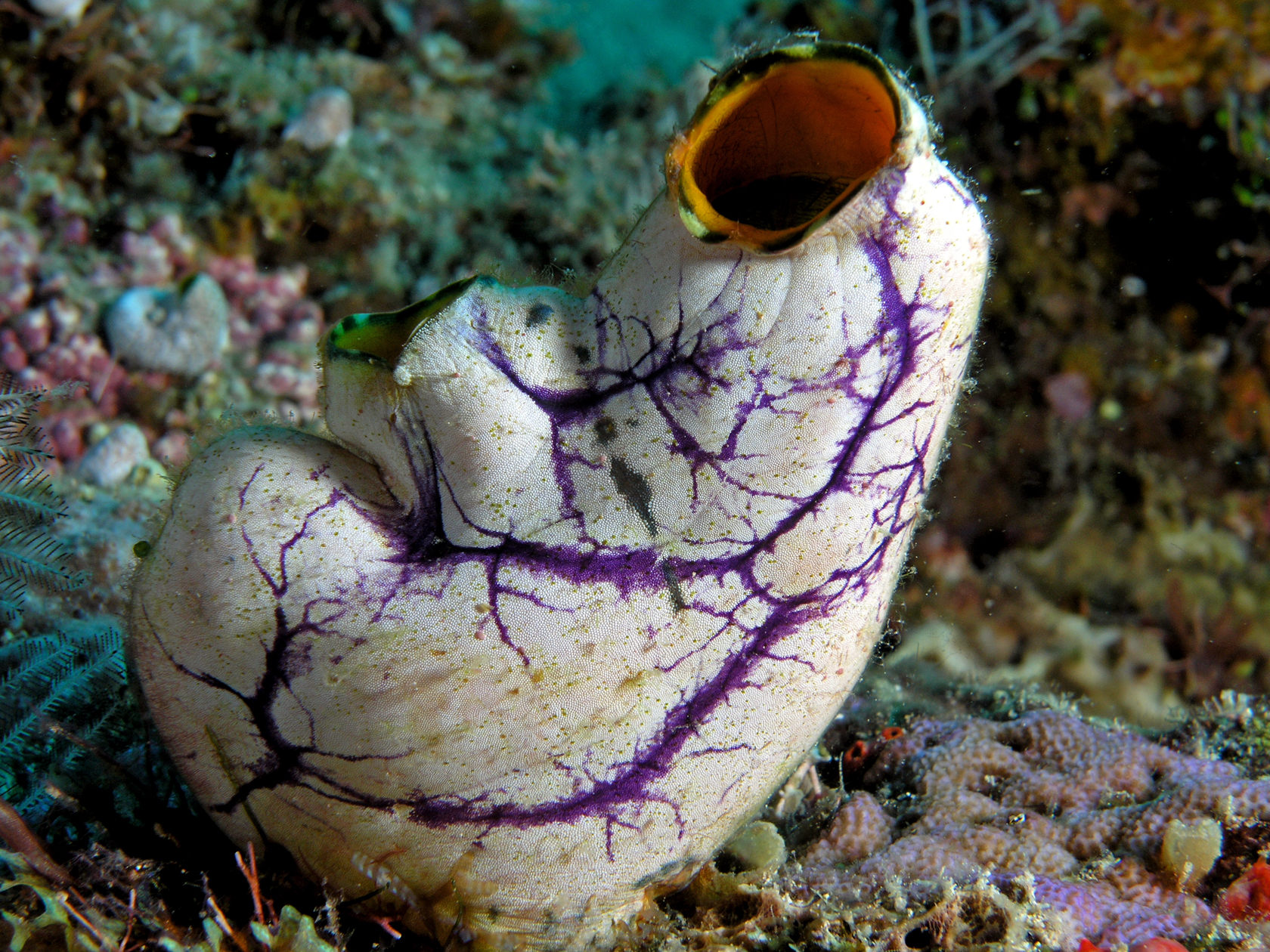
- Gold-mouth sea squirt (Polycarpa aurata)

Scientific classification
- Kingdom: Animalia
- Phylum: Chordata
- Clade: Olfactores
- Subphylum: Tunicata; Lamarck, 1816

Classes and unplaced genera
- "Ascidiacea"; Thaliacea; Appendicularia; †Yarnemia?; †Megasiphon; †Shankouclava?

Synonyms
- Urochordata Lankester, 1877

= Tunicate =

Tunicates Temporal range: Cambrian Stage 3–Present; 518–0 Ma; (Possible Ediacaran record, 575 Ma)

Marine animals, subphylum of chordates

Tunicates are marine invertebrates belonging to the subphylum Tunicata (/ˌtjuːnɪˈkeɪtə/ TEW-nih-KAY-tə). This grouping is part of the Chordata, a phylum which includes all animals with dorsal nerve cords and notochords (including vertebrates). The subphylum was at one time called Urochordata, and the term urochordates is still sometimes used for these animals.

Despite their simple appearance and very different adult form, their close relationship to the vertebrates is certain. Both groups are chordates, as evidenced by the fact that during their mobile larval stage, tunicates possess a notochord, a hollow dorsal nerve cord, pharyngeal slits, post-anal tail, and an endostyle. They resemble a tadpole.

Tunicates are the only chordates that have lost their myomeric segmentation, with the possible exception of the seriation of the gill slits. However, doliolids still display segmentation of the muscle bands.

Some tunicates live as solitary individuals, but others replicate by budding and become colonies, each unit being known as a zooid. They are marine filter feeders with a water-filled, sac-like body structure and two tubular openings, known as siphons, through which they draw in and expel water. During their respiration and feeding, they take in water through the incurrent (or inhalant) siphon and expel the filtered water through the excurrent (or exhalant) siphon. Adult ascidian tunicates are sessile, immobile and permanently attached to rocks or other hard surfaces on the ocean floor. Thaliaceans (pyrosomes, doliolids, and salps) and larvaceans on the other hand, swim in the pelagic zone of the sea as adults.

== Etymology ==
The term was coined in 1760 by nurseryman James Lee, meaning "coated or covered with integuments", fancifully anthropomorphizing the creatures' unique outer coverings as being "enclosed in a tunic". The word derives from Latin tunicātus, meaning "clothed with a tunic only (without a toga)". This "tunic", which is formed from proteins and carbohydrates, acts as an exoskeleton. In some species, it is thin, translucent, and gelatinous, while in others it is thick, tough, and stiff.

== Taxonomy ==
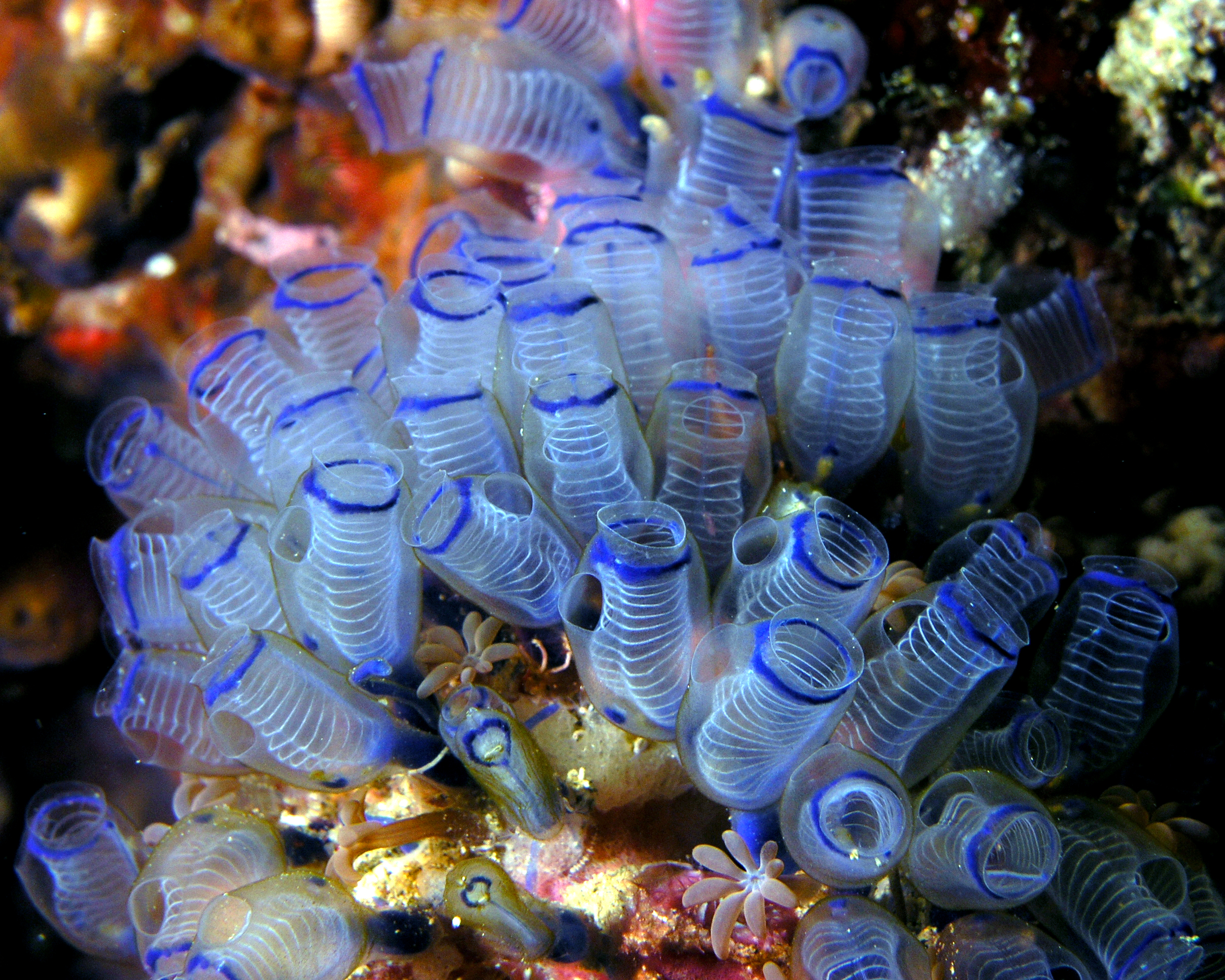
Clavelina moluccensis, the bluebell tunicate

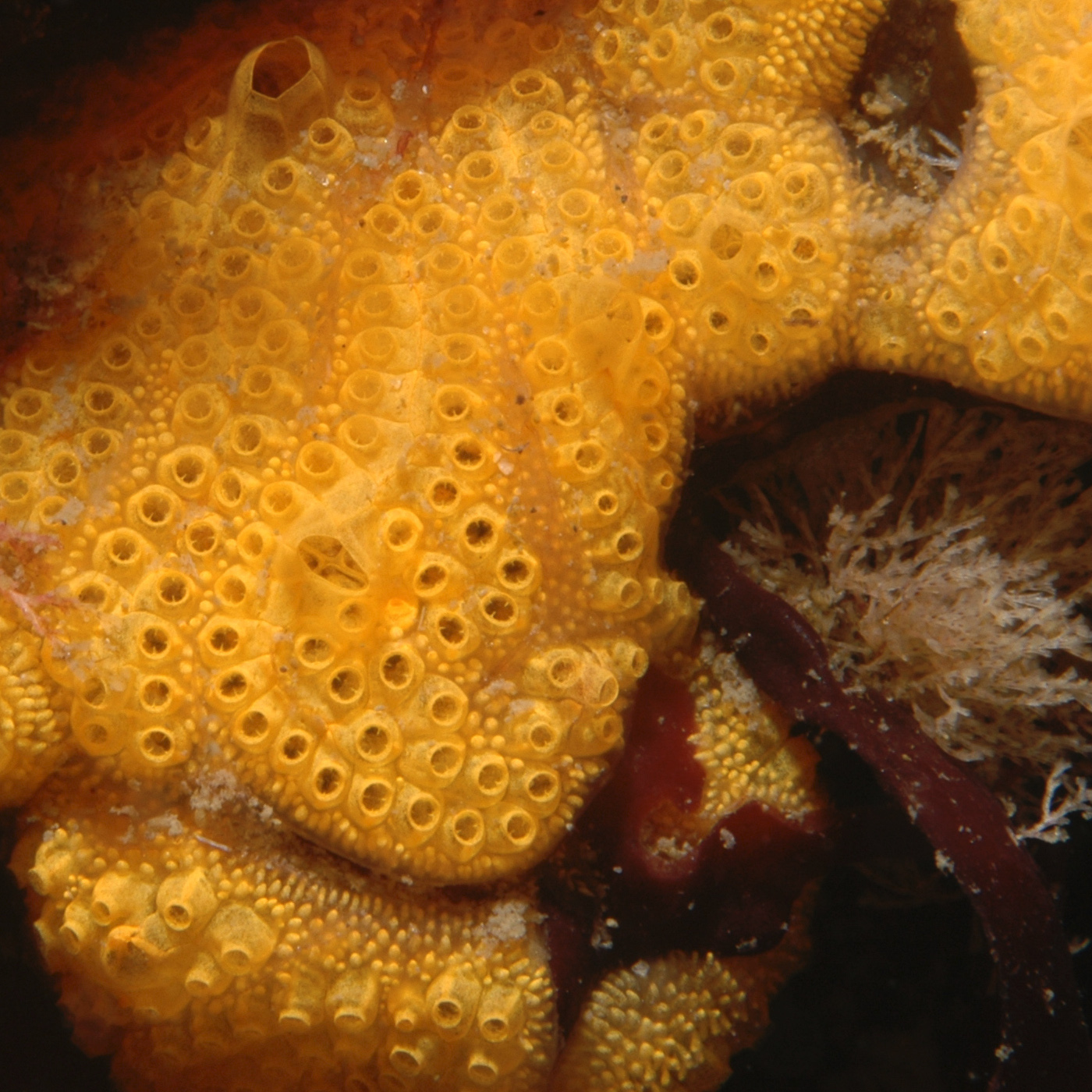
Botrylloides violaceus showing oral tentacles at openings of buccal siphons

About 3,000 species of tunicate exist in the world's oceans, living mostly in shallow water. The most numerous group is the ascidians; fewer than 100 species of these are found at depths greater than 200 m (660 ft). Some are solitary animals leading a sessile existence attached to the seabed, but others are colonial and a few are pelagic. Some are supported by a stalk, but most are attached directly to a substrate, which may be a rock, shell, coral, seaweed, mangrove root, dock, piling, or ship's hull. They are found in a range of solid or translucent colours and may resemble seeds, grapes, peaches, barrels, or bottles. One of the largest is a stalked sea tulip, Pyura pachydermatina, which can grow to be over 1 metre (3.3 ft) tall.

The Tunicata were established by Jean-Baptiste Lamarck in 1816. In 1881, Francis Maitland Balfour introduced another name for the same group, "Urochorda", to emphasize the affinity of the group to other chordates. No doubt largely because of his influence, various authors supported the term, either as such, or as the slightly older "Urochordata", but this usage is invalid because "Tunicata" has precedence, and grounds for superseding the name never existed. Accordingly, the current (formally correct) trend is to abandon the name Urochorda or Urochordata in favour of the original Tunicata, and the name Tunicata is almost invariably used in modern scientific works. It is accepted as valid by the World Register of Marine Species but not by the Integrated Taxonomic Information System.

Various common names are used for different species. Sea tulips are tunicates with colourful bodies supported on slender stalks. Sea squirts are so named because of their habit of contracting their bodies sharply and squirting out water when disturbed. Sea liver and sea pork get their names from the resemblance of their dead colonies to pieces of meat.

=== Classification ===
Tunicates are more closely related to craniates (including hagfish, lampreys, and jawed vertebrates) than to lancelets, echinoderms, hemichordates, Xenoturbella or other invertebrates.

The clade consisting of tunicates and vertebrates is called Olfactores.

The Tunicata contain roughly 3,051 described species, traditionally divided into these classes:

- Ascidiacea (Aplousobranchia, Phlebobranchia, and Stolidobranchia)
- Thaliacea (Pyrosomida, Doliolida, and Salpida)
- Appendicularia (Copelata)

Members of the Sorberacea were included in Ascidiacea in 2011 as a result of rDNA sequencing studies. Although the traditional classification is provisionally accepted, newer evidence suggests the Ascidiacea are an artificial group of paraphyletic status. A close relationship between Thaliacea and Ascidiacea, with the former possibly emerging from the latter, had already been proposed since the early 20th century under the name of Acopa.

The following cladogram is based on the 2018 phylogenomic study of Delsuc and colleagues.

- Tunicata
  - Appendicularia
    - Oikopleuridae
    - - Kowalevskiidae
      - Fritillariidae
  - Acopa
    - - Thaliacea
        - Pyrosomida
        - Salpida
        - Doliolida
      - Enterogona
        - Phlebobranchia
        - Aplousobranchia
    - - Stolidobranchia
        - Molgulidae
        - - Styelidae
          - Pyuridae

=== Fossil record ===
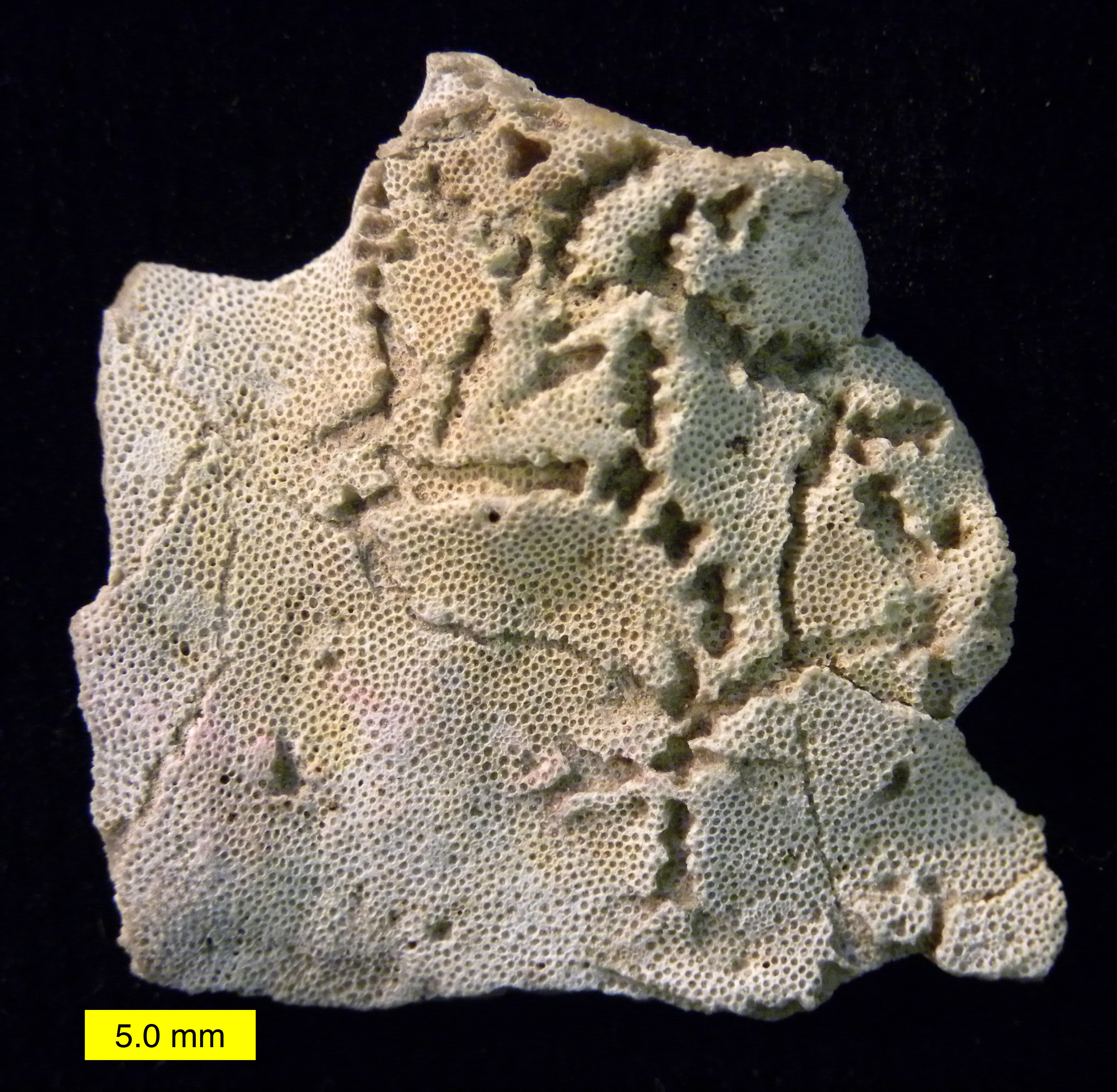
The star-shaped holes (Catellocaula vallata) in this Upper Ordovician bryozoan may represent a tunicate preserved by bioimmuration in the bryozoan skeleton.

Undisputed fossils of tunicates are rare. The well-preserved Middle Cambrian fossil, Megasiphon thylakos, shows that the tunicate basic body design had already been established 500 million years ago.

Two earlier putative tunicate species, Shankouclava shankouense and Cheungkongella ancestralis are known from the Lower Cambrian Maotianshan Shale. There is also a common bioimmuration, (Catellocaula vallata), of a possible tunicate found in Upper Ordovician bryozoan skeletons of the upper midwestern United States.

Three enigmatic species were also found from the Ediacaran period – Ausia fenestrata from the Nama Group of Namibia, the sac-like Yarnemia ascidiformis, and one from a second new Ausia-like genus from the Onega Peninsula of northern Russia, Burykhia hunti. Results of a new study have shown possible affinity of these Ediacaran organisms to the ascidians. Ausia and Burykhia lived in shallow coastal waters slightly more than 555 to 548 million years ago, and are believed to be the oldest evidence of the chordate lineage of metazoans. The Russian Precambrian fossil Yarnemia is identified as a tunicate only tentatively, because its fossils are nowhere near as well-preserved as those of Ausia and Burykhia, so this identification has been questioned.

Fossils of tunicates are rare because their bodies decay soon after death, but in some tunicate families, microscopic spicules are present, which may be preserved as microfossils. These spicules have occasionally been found in Jurassic and later rocks, but, as few palaeontologists are familiar with them, they may have been mistaken for sponge spicules.

In the Permian and the Triassic, there were also forms with a calcareous exoskeleton. At first, they were mistaken for corals.

=== Hybridization studies ===
A multi-taxon molecular study in 2010 proposed that sea squirts are descended from a hybrid between a chordate and a protostome ancestor (before the divergence of panarthropods and nematodes). This study was based on a quartet partitioning approach designed to reveal horizontal gene transfer events among metazoan phyla.

== Anatomy ==
=== Body form ===
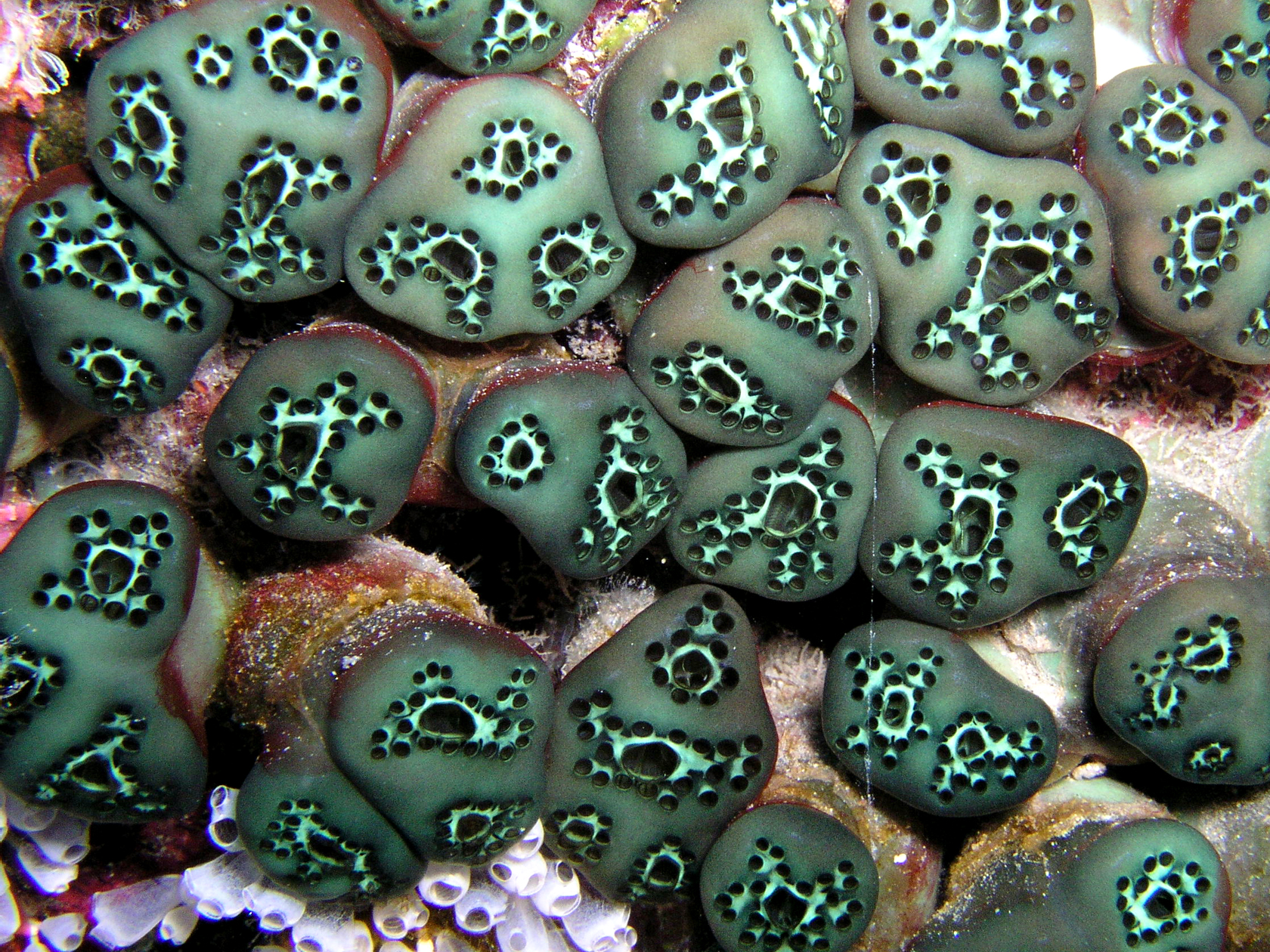
Colonial tunicate with multiple openings in a single tunic

Colonies of tunicates occur in a range of forms, and vary in the degree to which individual organisms, known as zooids, integrate with one another. In the simplest systems, the individual animals are widely separated, but linked together by horizontal connections called stolons, which grow along the seabed. Other species have the zooids growing closer together in a tuft or clustered together and sharing a common base. The most advanced colonies involve the integration of the zooids into a common structure surrounded by the tunic. These may have separate buccal siphons and a single central atrial siphon and may be organized into larger systems, with hundreds of star-shaped units. Often, the zooids in a colony are tiny but very numerous, and the colonies can form large encrusting or mat-like patches.

=== Body structure ===
By far the largest class of tunicates is the Ascidiacea. The body of an ascidiacean is surrounded by a test or tunic, from which the subphylum derives its name. This varies in thickness between species but may be tough, resembling cartilage, thin and delicate, or transparent and gelatinous. The tunic is composed of proteins, crosslinked by phenoloxidase reaction, and complex carbohydrates, and includes tunicin, a variety of cellulose. The tunic is unique among invertebrate exoskeletons in that it can grow as the animal enlarges and does not need to be periodically shed. Inside the tunic is the body wall or mantle composed of connective tissue, muscle fibres, blood vessels, and nerves. Two openings are found in the body wall: the buccal siphon at the top through which water flows into the interior, and the atrial siphon on the ventral side through which it is expelled. A large pharynx occupies most of the interior of the body. It is a muscular tube linking the buccal opening with the rest of the gut. It has a ciliated groove known as an endostyle on its ventral surface, and this secretes a mucous net which collects food particles and is wound up on the dorsal side of the pharynx. The gullet, at the lower end of the pharynx, links it to a loop of gut which terminates near the atrial siphon. The walls of the pharynx are perforated by several bands of slits, known as stigmata, through which water escapes into the surrounding water-filled cavity, the atrium. This is criss-crossed by various rope-like mesenteries which extend from the mantle and provide support for the pharynx, preventing it from collapsing, and also hold up the other organs.

The Thaliacea, the other main class of tunicates, is characterised by free-swimming, pelagic individuals. They are all filter feeders using a pharyngeal mucous net to catch their prey. The pyrosomes are bioluminous colonial tunicates with a hollow cylindrical structure. The buccal siphons are on the outside and the atrial siphons inside. About ten species are known, and all are found in the tropics. The 23 species of doliolids are small, mostly under 2 cm (0.79 in) long. They are solitary, have the two siphons at opposite ends of their barrel-shaped bodies, and swim by jet propulsion. The 40 species of salps are also small, under 4 cm (1.6 in) long, and found in the surface waters of both warm and cold seas. They also move by jet propulsion, and often form long chains by budding off new individuals.

A third class, the Larvacea (or Appendicularia), is the only group of tunicates to retain their chordate characteristics in the adult state, a product of extensive neoteny. The 70 species of larvaceans superficially resemble the tadpole larvae of amphibians, although the tail is at right angles to the body. The notochord is retained, and the animals, mostly under 1 cm long, are propelled by undulations of the tail. They secrete an external mucous net known as a house, which may completely surround them and is very efficient at trapping planktonic particles.

=== Physiology and internal anatomy ===
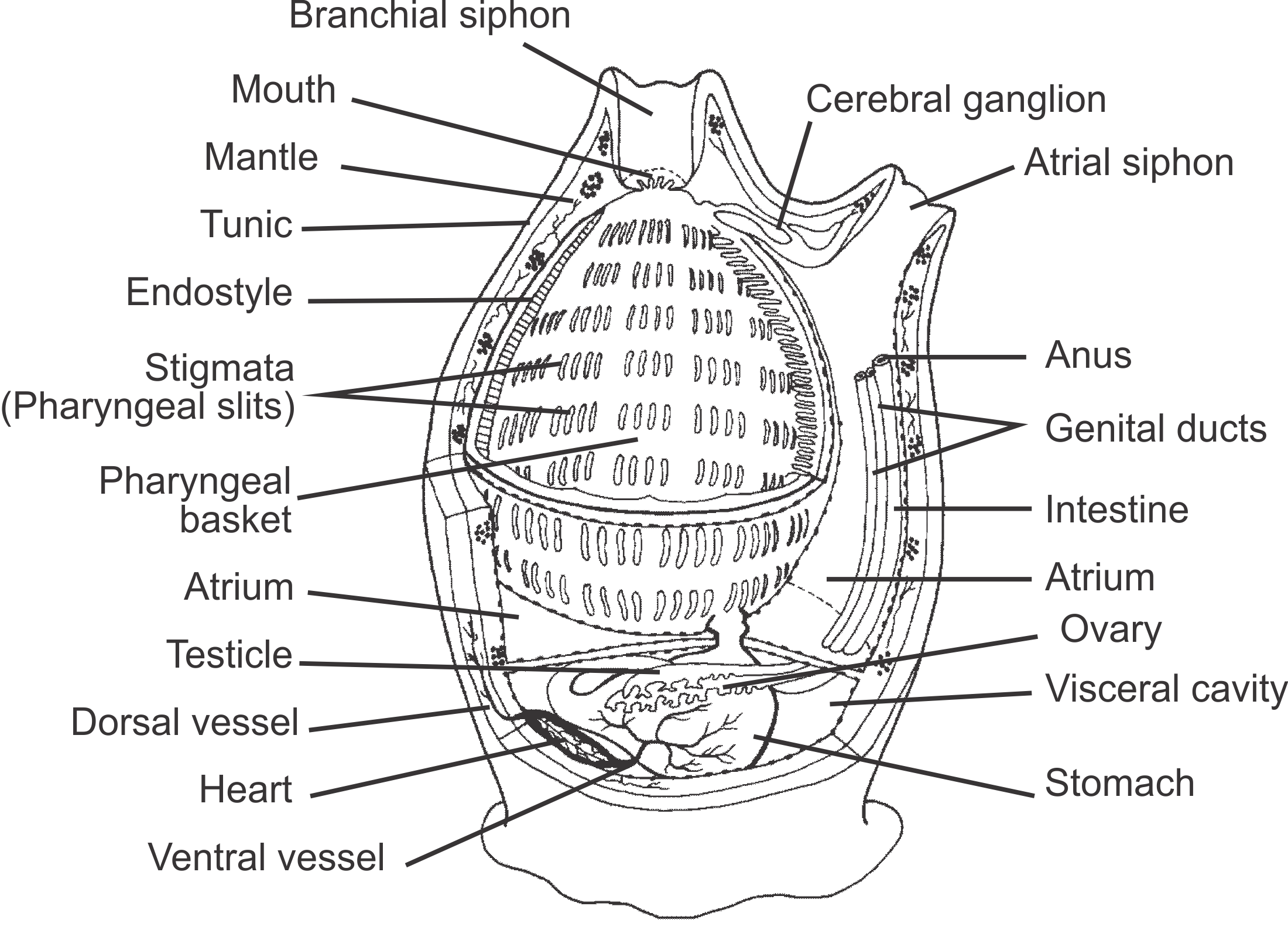
Internal anatomy of a generalised tunicate

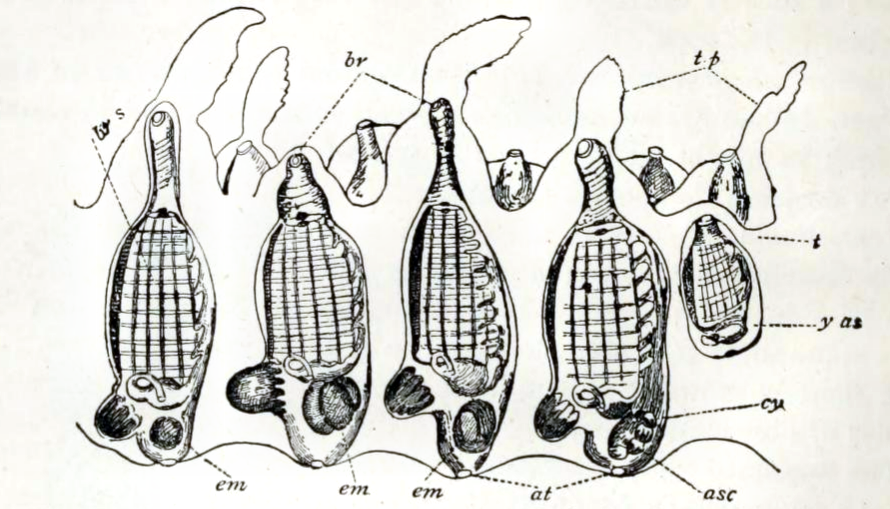
Section through the wall of an ascidian pyrosoma showing several zooids; (br) buccal siphon; (at) atrial siphon; (tp) test process; (br s) pharynx

Like all other chordates, tunicates have a notochord during their early development, but it is lost by the time they have completed their metamorphosis. As members of the Chordata, they are true Coelomata with endoderm, ectoderm, and mesoderm, but they do not develop very clear coelomic body cavities, if any at all. Whether they do or not, by the end of their larval development, all that remain are the pericardial, renal, and gonadal cavities of the adults. Except for the heart, gonads, and pharynx (or branchial sac), the organs are enclosed in a membrane called an epicardium, which is surrounded by the jelly-like mesenchyme.

Ascidian tunicates begin life as a lecithotrophic (non-feeding) mobile larva that resembles a tadpole, with the exception of some members of the families Styelidae and Molgulidae which has direct development. The latter also have several species with tail-less larval forms. The ascidian larvae very rapidly settle down and attach themselves to a suitable surface, later developing into a barrel-like and usually sedentary adult form. The species in the class Appendicularia are pelagic, and the general larval form is kept throughout life. Also the class Thaliacea is pelagic throughout their lives and may have complex lifecycles. In this class a free living larval stage is absent: Doliolids and pyrosomatids are viviparous–lecithotrophic, and salpids are viviparous–matrotrophic. Only some species of doliolids still have a rudimentary tailed tadpole stage, which is never free-living and lacks a brain.

Tunicates have a well-developed heart and circulatory system. The heart is a double U-shaped tube situated just below the gut. The blood vessels are simple connective tissue tubes, and their blood has several types of corpuscle. The blood may appear pale green, but this is not due to any respiratory pigments, and oxygen is transported dissolved in the plasma. Exact details of the circulatory system are unclear, but the gut, pharynx, gills, gonads, and nervous system seem to be arranged in series rather than in parallel, as happens in most other animals. Every few minutes, the heart stops beating and then restarts, pumping fluid in the reverse direction.

Tunicate blood has some unusual features. In some species of Ascidiidae and Perophoridae, it contains high concentrations of the transitional metal vanadium and vanadium-associated proteins in vacuoles in blood cells known as vanadocytes. Some tunicates can concentrate vanadium up to a level ten million times that of the surrounding seawater. It is stored in a +3 oxidation form that requires a pH of less than 2 for stability, and this is achieved by the vacuoles also containing sulfuric acid. The vanadocytes are later deposited just below the outer surface of the tunic, where their presence is thought to deter predation, although it is unclear whether this is due to the presence of the metal or low pH. Other species of tunicates concentrate lithium, iron, niobium, and tantalum, which may serve a similar function. Other tunicate species produce distasteful organic compounds as chemical defenses against predators.

Tunicates lack the kidney-like metanephridial organs typical of deuterostomes. Most have no excretory structures, but rely on the diffusion of ammonia across their tissues to rid themselves of nitrogenous waste, though some have a simple excretory system. The typical renal organ is a mass of large clear-walled vesicles that occupy the rectal loop, and the structure has no duct. Each vesicle is a remnant of a part of the primitive coelom, and its cells extract nitrogenous waste matter from circulating blood. They accumulate the wastes inside the vesicles as urate crystals, and do not have any obvious means of disposing of the material during their lifetimes.

Adult tunicates have a hollow cerebral ganglion, equivalent to a brain, and a hollow structure known as a neural gland. Both originate from the embryonic neural tube and are located between the two siphons. Nerves arise from the two ends of the ganglion; those from the anterior end innervate the buccal siphon and those from the posterior end supply the rest of the body, the atrial siphon, organs, gut and the musculature of the body wall. There are no sense organs but there are sensory cells on the siphons, the buccal tentacles and in the atrium.

Tunicates are unusual among animals in that they produce a large fraction of their tunic and some other structures in the form of cellulose. The production in animals of cellulose is so unusual that at first some researchers denied its presence outside of plants, but the tunicates were later found to possess a functional cellulose synthesizing enzyme, encoded by a gene horizontally transferred from a Actinobacterium. When, in 1845, Carl Schmidt first announced the presence in the test of some ascidians of a substance very similar to cellulose, he called it "tunicine", but it is now recognized as cellulose rather than any alternative substance.

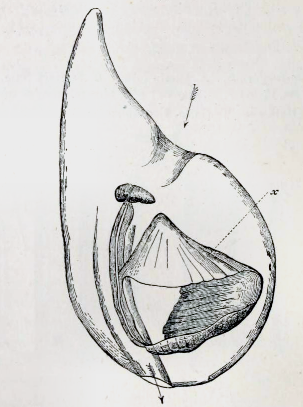
Oikopleura cophocerca in its "house". Arrows indicate water movement and (x) the lateral reticulated parts of the house.

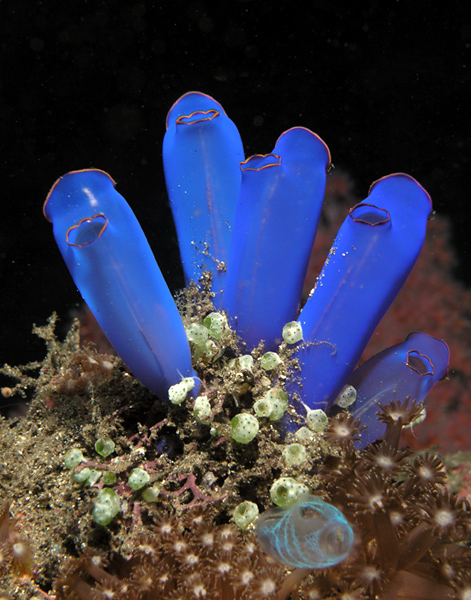
Blue sea squirts from the genus Rhopalaea

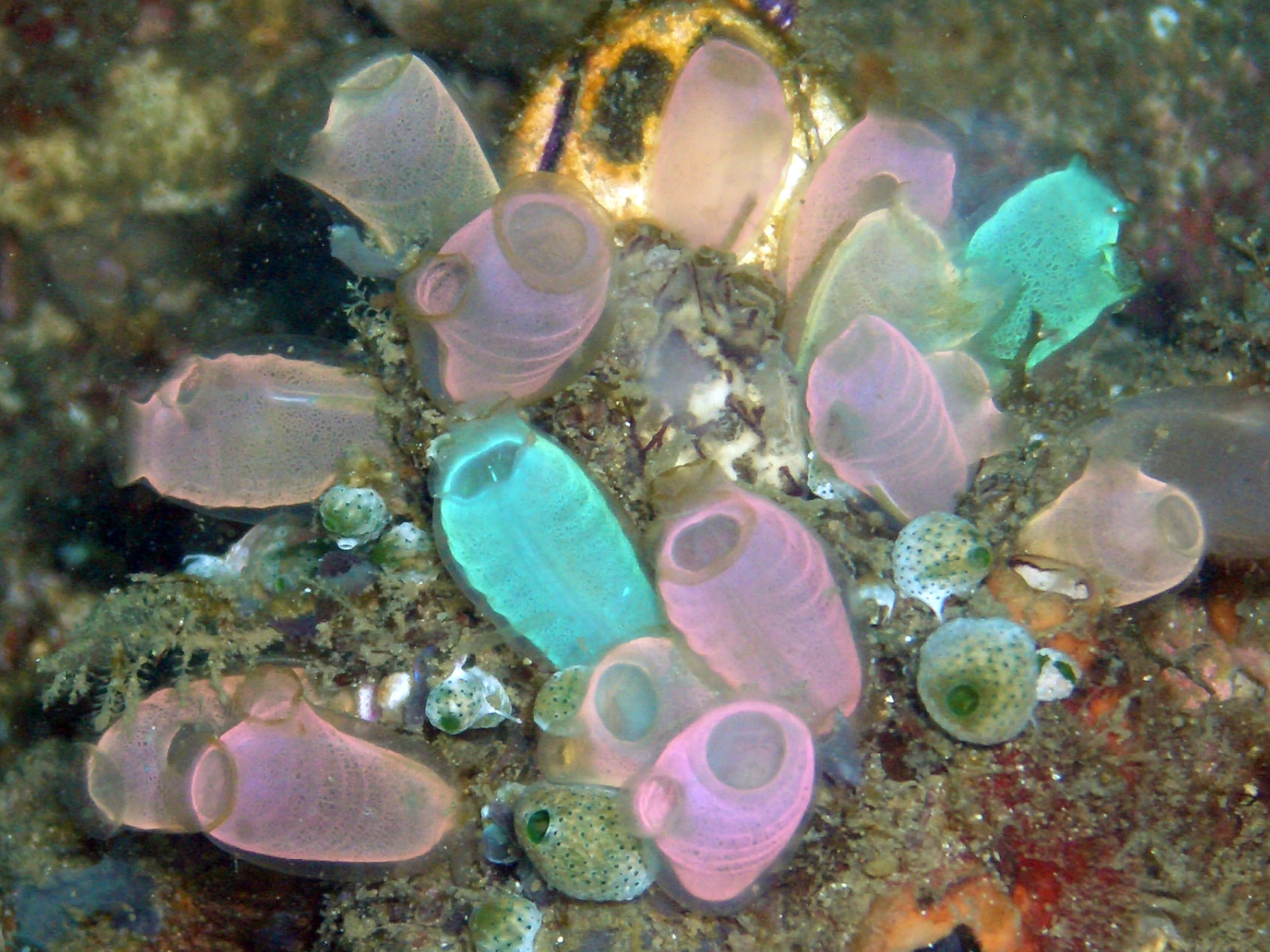
Fluorescent-colored sea squirts, Rhopalaea crassa

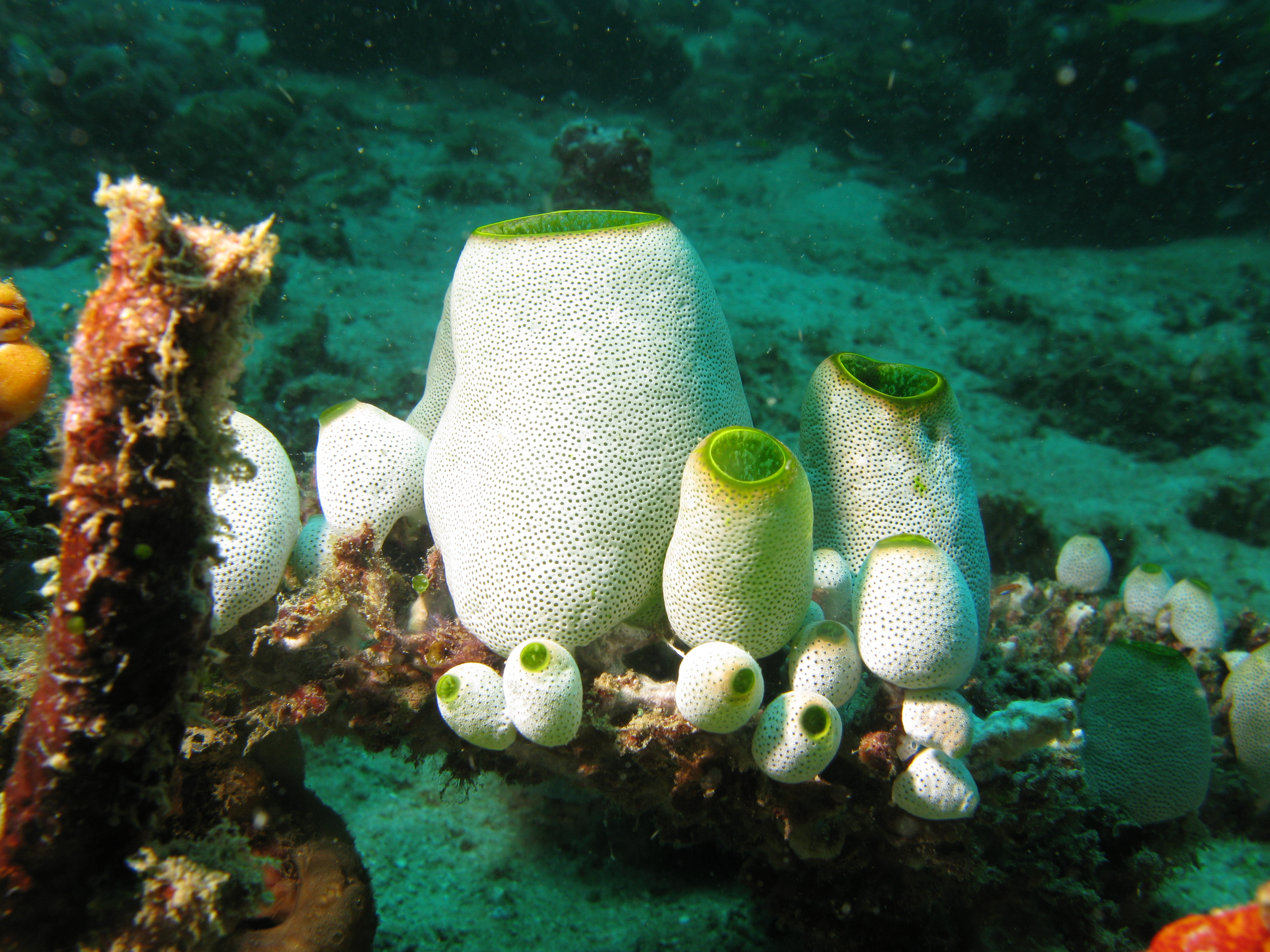
Didemnum molle

== Feeding ==
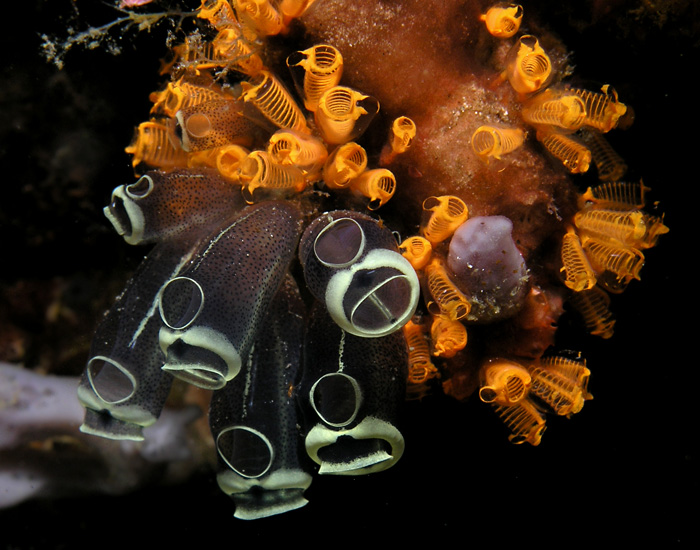
Clavelina robusta (black and white) and Pycnoclavella flava (orange) showing siphons

Nearly all adult tunicates are suspension feeders (the larval form usually does not feed), capturing planktonic particles by filtering sea water through their bodies. Ascidians are typical in their digestive processes, but other tunicates have similar systems. Water is drawn into the body through the buccal siphon by the action of cilia lining the gill slits. To obtain enough food, an average ascidian needs to process one body-volume of water per second. This is drawn through a net lining the pharynx which is being continuously secreted by the endostyle. The net is made of sticky mucus threads with holes about 0.5 μm in diameter which can trap planktonic particles including bacteria. The net is rolled up on the dorsal side of the pharynx, and it and the trapped particles are drawn into the esophagus. The gut is U-shaped and also ciliated to move the contents along. The stomach is an enlarged region at the lowest part of the U-bend. Here, digestive enzymes are secreted and a pyloric gland (absent in appendicularians) adds further secretions. After digestion, the food is moved on through the intestine, where absorption takes place, and the rectum, where undigested remains are formed into faecal pellets or strings. The anus opens into the dorsal or cloacal part of the peribranchial cavity near the atrial siphon. Here, the faeces are caught up by the constant stream of water which carries the waste to the exterior. The animal orientates itself to the current in such a way that the buccal siphon is always upstream and does not draw in contaminated water.

Some ascidians that live on soft sediments are detritivores. A few deepwater species, such as Megalodicopia hians, are sit-and-wait predators, trapping tiny crustacea, nematodes, and other small invertebrates with the muscular lobes which surround their buccal siphons. Certain tropical species in the family Didemnidae have symbiotic green algae or cyanobacteria in their tunics, and one of these symbionts, Prochloron, is unique to tunicates. Excess photosynthetic products are assumed to be available to the host.

== Life cycle ==
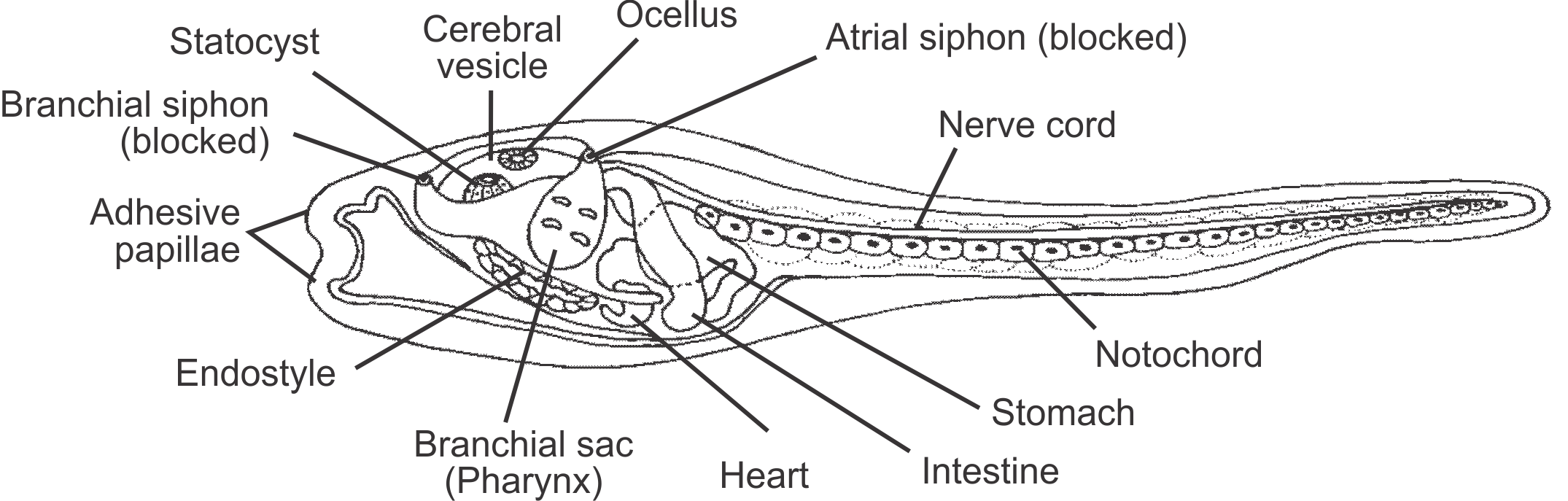
Anatomy of a larval tunicate

Tunicates are almost all hermaphrodites (Oikopleura dioica being a rare exception), and each has a single ovary and testis, either near the gut or on the body wall. All larvaceans are semelparous and have external fertilization, and all thaliaceans have internal fertilization. In solitary ascidians, sperm and eggs are generally shed into the sea and the larvae are planktonic. In colonial ascidians, fertilization is internal; sperm is released into the water and drawn into the atria of other individuals with the incoming water current. Fertilization takes place here and the eggs are brooded through their early developmental stages. Some larval forms appear very much like primitive chordates with a notochord (stiffening rod) and superficially resemble small tadpoles. These swim by undulations of the tail and may have a simple eye, an ocellus, and a balancing organ, a statocyst.

When sufficiently developed, the larva of the sessile species finds a suitable rock and cements itself in place. The larval form is not capable of feeding, though it may have a rudimentary digestive system, and is only a dispersal mechanism. Many physical changes occur to the tunicate's body during metamorphosis, one of the most significant being the reduction of the cerebral ganglion, which controls movement and is the equivalent of the vertebrate brain. From this comes the common saying that the sea squirt "eats its own brain". However, the adult does possess a cerebral ganglion adapted to lack of self-locomotion. In the Thaliacea, the larval stage is rudimentary or suppressed, and the adults are pelagic (swimming or drifting in the open sea). Colonial forms also increase the size of the colony by budding off new individuals to share the same tunic.

Pyrosome colonies grow by budding off new zooids near the posterior end of the colony. Sexual reproduction starts within a zooid with an internally fertilized egg. This develops directly into an oozooid without any intervening larval form. This buds precociously to form four blastozooids which become detached in a single unit when the oozooid disintegrates. The atrial siphon of the oozooid becomes the exhalent siphon for the new, four-zooid colony.

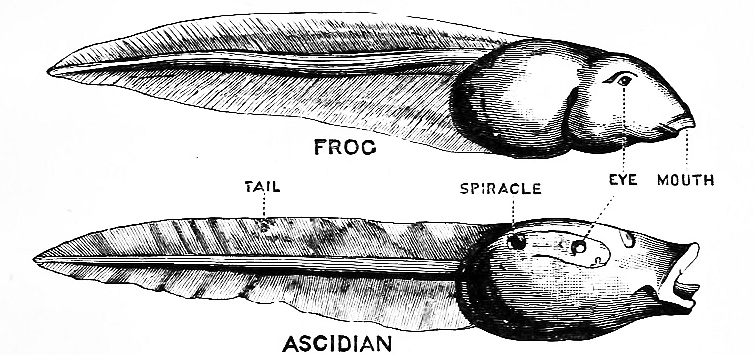
A 1901 comparison of frog tadpole and a tunicate larva

Doliolids have a very complex life cycle that includes various zooids with different functions. The sexually reproducing members of the colony are known as gonozooids. Each one is a hermaphrodite with the eggs being fertilised by sperm from another individual. The gonozooid is viviparous, and at first, the developing embryo feeds on its yolk sac before being released into the sea as a free-swimming, tadpole-like larva. This undergoes metamorphosis in the water column into an oozooid. This is known as a "nurse" as it develops a tail of zooids produced by budding asexually. Some of these are known as trophozooids, have a nutritional function, and are arranged in lateral rows. Others are phorozooids, have a transport function, and are arranged in a single central row. Other zooids link to the phorozooids, which then detach themselves from the nurse. These zooids develop into gonozooids, and when these are mature, they separate from the phorozooids to live independently and start the cycle over again. Meanwhile, the phorozooids have served their purpose and disintegrate. The asexual phase in the lifecycle allows the doliolid to multiply very rapidly when conditions are favourable.

Salps also have a complex lifecycle with an alternation of generations. In the solitary life history phase, an oozooid reproduces asexually, producing a chain of tens or hundreds of individual zooids by budding along the length of a stolon. The chain of salps is the 'aggregate' portion of the lifecycle. The aggregate individuals, known as blastozooids, remain attached together while swimming and feeding and growing larger. The blastozooids are sequential hermaphrodites. An egg in each is fertilized internally by a sperm from another colony. The egg develops in a brood sac inside the blastozooid and has a placental connection to the circulating blood of its "nurse". When it fills the blastozooid's body, it is released to start the independent life of an oozooid.

Larvaceans only reproduce sexually. They are protandrous hermaphrodites, except for Oikopleura dioica which is gonochoric, and a larva resembles the tadpole larva of ascidians. Once the trunk is fully developed, the larva undergoes "tail shift", in which the tail moves from a rearward position to a ventral orientation and twists through 90° relative to the trunk. The larva consists of a small, fixed number of cells, and grows by enlargement of these rather than cell division. Development is very rapid and only takes seven hours for a zygote to develop into a house-building juvenile starting to feed.

During embryonic development, tunicates exhibit determinate cleavage, where the fate of the cells is set early on with reduced cell numbers and genomes that are rapidly evolving. In contrast, the amphioxus and vertebrates show cell determination relatively late in development and cell cleavage is indeterminate. The genome evolution of amphioxus and vertebrates is also relatively slow.

=== Promotion of out-crossing ===
Ciona intestinalis (class Ascidiacea) is a hermaphrodite that releases sperm and eggs into the surrounding seawater almost simultaneously. It is self-sterile, and thus has been used for studies on the mechanism of self-incompatibility. Self/non-self-recognition molecules play a key role in the process of interaction between sperm and the vitelline coat of the egg. It appears that self/non-self recognition in ascidians such as C. intestinalis is mechanistically similar to self-incompatibility systems in flowering plants. Self-incompatibility promotes out-crossing, and thus provides the adaptive advantage at each generation of the masking of deleterious recessive mutations (i.e. genetic complementation) and the avoidance of inbreeding depression.

Botryllus schlosseri (class Ascidiacea) is a colonial tunicate, a member of the only group of chordates that are able to reproduce both sexually and asexually. B. schlosseri is a sequential (protogynous) hermaphrodite, and in a colony, eggs are ovulated about two days before the peak of sperm emission. Thus self-fertilization is avoided, and cross-fertilization is favored. Although avoided, self-fertilization is still possible in B. schlosseri. Self-fertilized eggs develop with a substantially higher frequency of anomalies during cleavage than cross-fertilized eggs (23% vs. 1.6%). Also a significantly lower percentage of larvae derived from self-fertilized eggs metamorphose, and the growth of the colonies derived from their metamorphosis is significantly lower. These findings suggest that self-fertilization gives rise to inbreeding depression associated with developmental deficits that are likely caused by expression of deleterious recessive mutations.

=== A model tunicate ===
Oikopleura dioica (class Appendicularia) is a semelparous organism, reproducing only once in its lifetime. It employs an original reproductive strategy in which the entire female germ-line is contained within an ovary that is a single giant multinucleate cell termed the "coenocyst". O. dioica can be maintained in laboratory culture, and is of growing interest as a model organism because of its phylogenetic position within the closest sister group to vertebrates.

== Invasive species ==
Over the past few decades, tunicates (notably of the genera Didemnum and Styela) have been invading coastal waters in many countries. The carpet tunicate (Didemnum vexillum) has taken over a 6.5 mi^{2} (17 km^{2}) area of the seabed on the Georges Bank off the northeast coast of North America, covering stones, molluscs, and other stationary objects in a dense mat. D. vexillum, Styela clava and Ciona savignyi have appeared and are thriving in Puget Sound and Hood Canal in the Pacific Northwest.

Invasive tunicates usually arrive as fouling organisms on the hulls of ships, but may also be introduced as larvae in ballast water. Another possible means of introduction is on the shells of molluscs brought in for marine cultivation. Current research indicates many tunicates previously thought to be indigenous to Europe and the Americas are, in fact, invaders. Some of these invasions may have occurred centuries or even millennia ago. In some areas, tunicates are proving to be a major threat to aquaculture operations.

== Use by humans ==
=== Medical uses ===
Tunicates contain a host of potentially useful chemical compounds, including:

- Plitidepsin, a didemnin effective against various types of cancer; as of late January 2021 undergoing Phase III trials as a treatment for COVID-19
- Trabectedin, an FDA approved anticancer drug.

Tunicates are able to correct their own cellular abnormalities over a series of generations, and a similar regenerative process may be possible for humans. The mechanisms underlying the phenomenon may lead to insights about the potential of cells and tissues to be reprogrammed and to regenerate compromised human organs.

=== As food ===
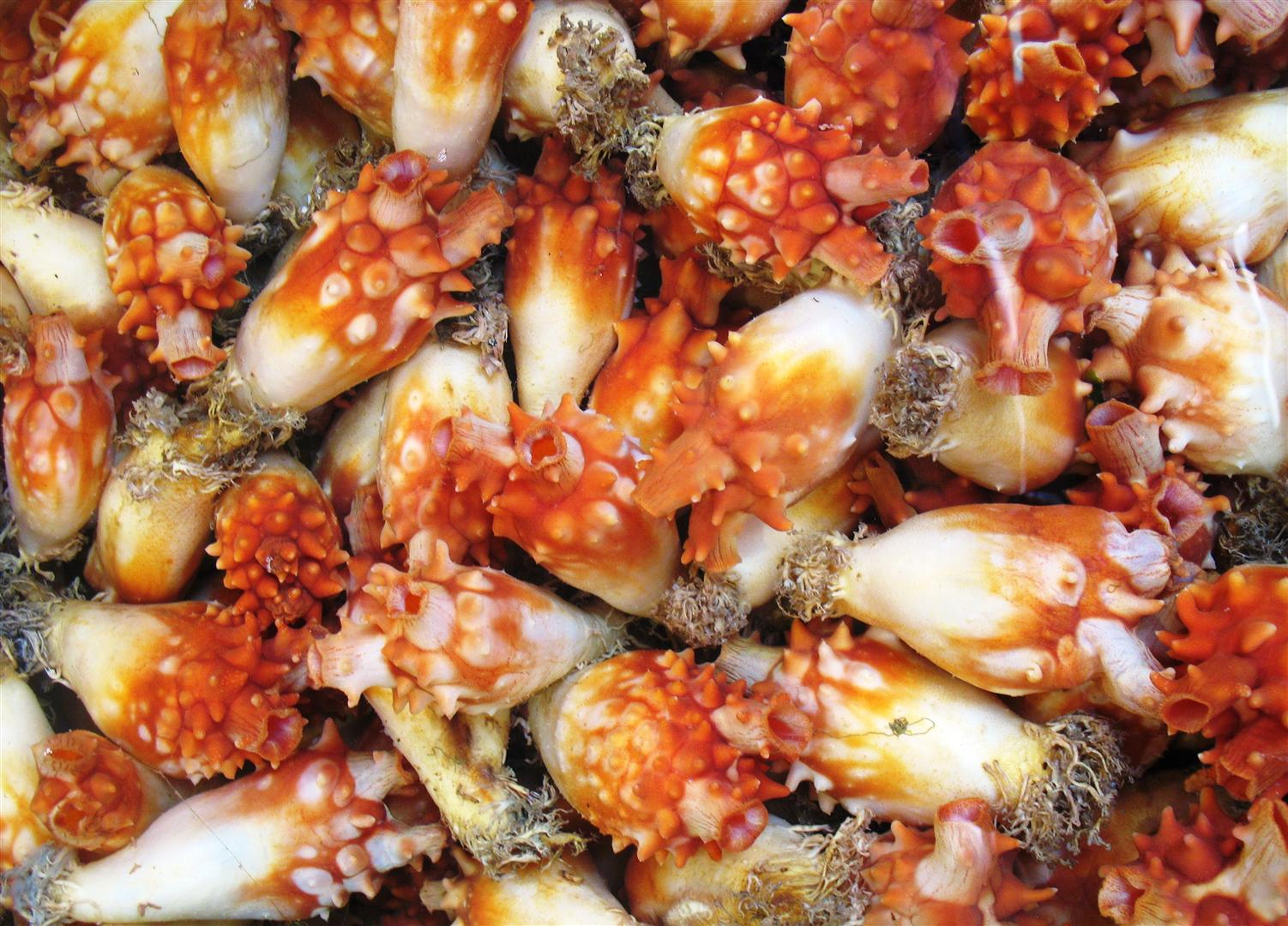
Halocynthia tunicates for sale at a market, Busan, South Korea

Various Ascidiacea species are consumed as food around the world. The piure (Pyura chilensis) is used in the cuisine of Chile, both raw and in seafood stews. In Japan and Korea, the sea pineapple (Halocynthia roretzi) is the main species eaten. It is cultivated on dangling cords made of palm fronds. In 1994, over 42,000 tons were produced, but since then, mass mortality events have occurred among the farmed sea squirts (the tunics becoming soft), and only 4,500 tons were produced in 2004.

=== Other uses ===
The use of tunicates as a source of biofuel is being researched. The cellulose body wall can be broken down and converted into ethanol, and other parts of the animal are protein-rich and can be converted into fish feed. Culturing tunicates on a large scale may be possible and the economics of doing so are attractive. As tunicates have few predators, their removal from the sea may not have profound ecological impacts. Being sea-based, their production does not compete with food production as does the cultivation of land-based crops for biofuel projects.

Some tunicates are used as model organisms. Ciona intestinalis and Ciona savignyi have been used for developmental studies. Both species' mitochondrial and nuclear genomes have been sequenced. The nuclear genome of the appendicularian Oikopleura dioica appears to be one of the smallest among metazoans and this species has been used to study gene regulation and the evolution and development of chordates.

== See also ==
- Vetulicolia – early deuterostomes which are possibly the sister group of modern tunicates
- Donald I. Williamson – claimed hybridization
- Glossary of tunicate anatomy
