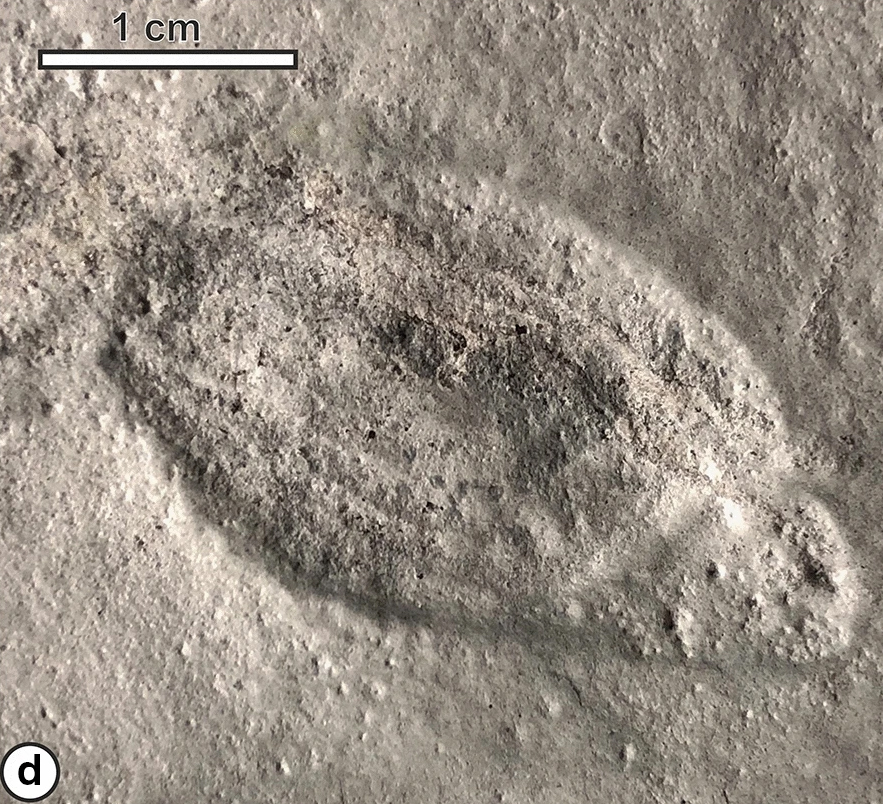
- The holotype of F. oblonga, scale bar 2 cm (0.79 in)

Scientific classification
- Kingdom: Animalia
- Phylum: Chordata
- Subphylum: Tunicata
- Class: Ascidiacea (?)
- Family: †Ausiidae
- Genus: †Finkoella; Martyshyn and Uchman, 2021

Species
- †F. ukrainica Martyshyn and Uchman, 2021 (type species); †F. oblonga Martyshyn and Uchman, 2021

= Finkoella =

Finkoella Temporal range: Ediacaran, 557–542 Ma

Small, Tunicate-like animal of the Ediacaran Period

Finkoella is a genus of sack-like body fossils of an Ediacaran tunicate-like organism that was first described from a spot in Ukraine in 2021. In the same paper that described the genus Finkoella, another organism was described named Pharyngomorpha, being a reticulate, possibly being a fragment of the pharyngeal basket of a Finkoella. This fossil is also described from the Marwar Super Group [MSG] of rocks of Sonia Sandstone at Jodhpur region in Sursagar area. The genus contains two species, F. ukrainica and F. oblonga, with the former of which being the type species of this genus, with its name referring to where it was described from, Ukraine.

It is also worth noting the similarities of Finkoella ukrainica to fossilised clay pebbles, that are also seen within the Cambrian, that also showed up with the holotype of F. ukrainica. These double siphon tunicate organism Finkoella shows a distinct organic layer compared to the surrounding rock of the Marwar Supergroup.

== Description ==
=== F. ukrainica ===
F. ukrainica seems to be represented by oval- elliptical-shaped fossils, that rarely ever become the same shape as F. oblonga, which are thought to show a short, protruding neck-like structure and/or a shallow sinus. Often, a low or shallow circular protrusion/depression can be spotted in the convex or concave structure of the fossil. Smaller specimens of this species can be present without the protruding neck as well as the other multiple protrusions/depressions within the fossils. Specimens which are less than 25 mm (0.98 in) are thought of as being juveniles, with its holotype being selected from a number of adult individuals that have been completely developed and show signs of the best preservation of the organism.

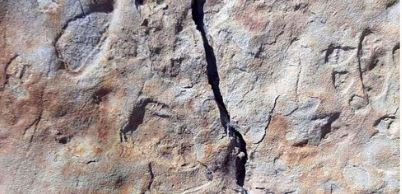
The image above shows the upper surface of the finely grained sandstone slab from the Yampol member of the Mogilev formation that was located inside a quarry near the DHPS. The slab showed in the image is a general view of Finkoella ukrainica specimens that also includes the paratype. Although these could simply just be rounded clay pebbles fossilised.

The holotype for F. ukrainica is described as a convex oval-shaped form on the lower surface of a micaceous clayey, with very finely grained sandstone making up its slab. The holotype was measured as being 95 mm (3.7 in) long and up to 55 mm (2.2 in) wide, with there also being a round protrusion roughly 5 mm (0.20 in) in diameter located slightly eccentrically towards one of the ends of the fossil. One of the aforementioned ends being more elongated, with the other end being more rounded in nature. The latter of the ends shows a short, protruding neck that becomes wider when reaching its termination. With the termination that ends the neck being rather unevenly lobate, with the terminations margins being sharp and even in appearance. The structures surface is generally smooth, except for the local grain-sized corrugations, the thin and short grooves and a longer, narrower groove that runs obliquely throughout three-quarters of the width that is closer to the wider end of the holotype's body.

=== F. oblonga ===
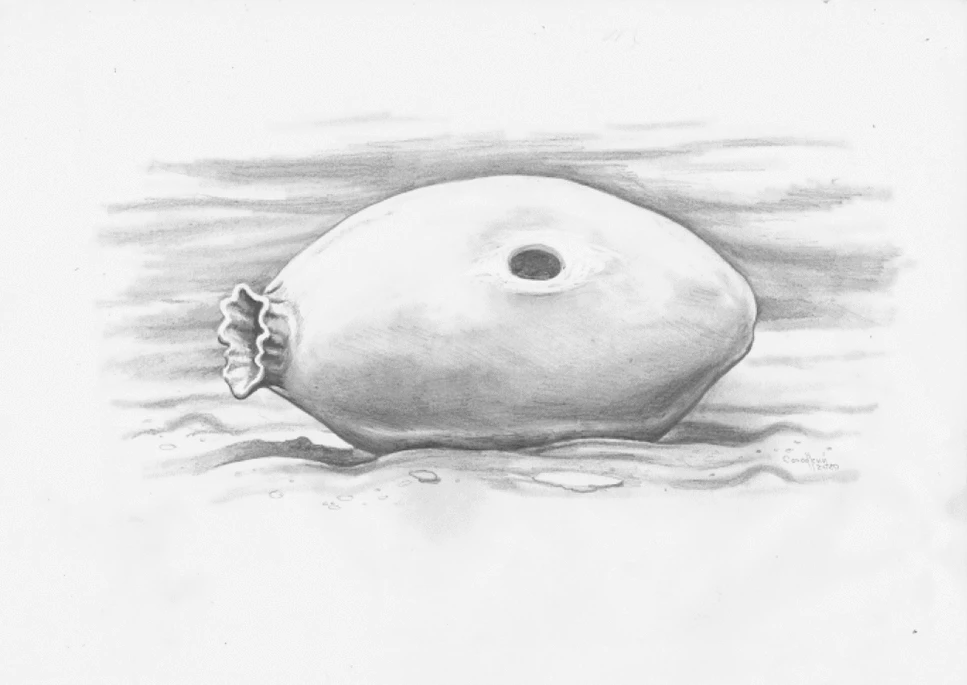
Artist restoration

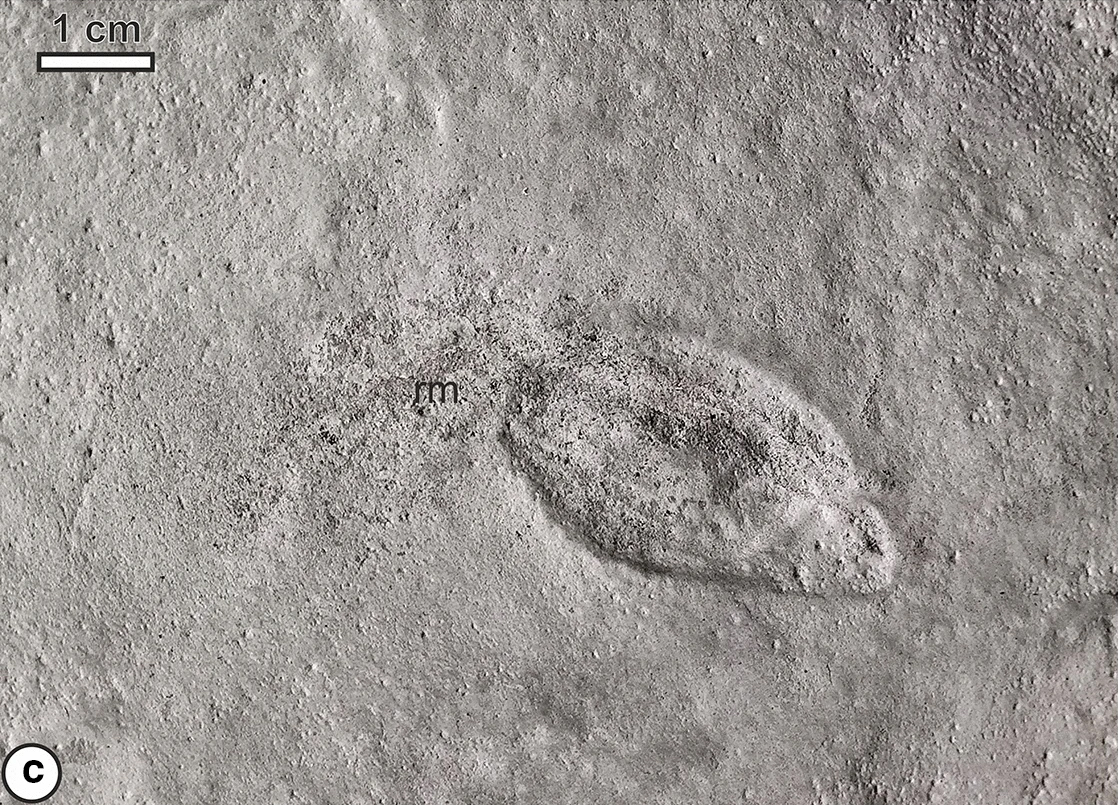
A fossil of F. oblonga, showing the winding margins across its body. The fossil was found in the Mogilev formation within a quarry.

F. oblonga represents itself as a more elongated Finkoella that shows winding margins across its body, alongside longitudinal furrows/ridges which tend to run parallel to the fossil's margin. The holotype of this form shows an elongated, cucumber-like structure that is 120 mm (4.7 in) long and 42 mm (1.7 in) wide which is visible as a positive part (its convex) with its negative counterpart being visible in a horizontally split slab (its concave). The holotype for F. oblonga also shows six longitudinal, low grooves and ridges across its body that also manifest gentle slopes about 3–4 mm (0.12–0.16 in) wide that run parallel to the margin of its structure and turn accordingly when they reach the terminations in the fossil. And as a result of that, tend to form concentric rings around the terminations. These concentric rings are more continuous on one side than the opposite side, where on the latter only fragments of them are visible instead of the full ring. This structure also shows a multitude of small corrugations, although these corrugations do not form any pattern whatsoever. The edges of the structure are remarkably either elevated or depressed and more often than not show a double ridge which is 1.5–3 mm (0.059–0.118 in).

== Etymology ==
The generic epithet, Finkoella, honours the amateur palaeontologist S.V. Finko who helped provide the holotype for F. ukrainica, as well as the sandstone slab that had the paratype of F. oblonga fossilised onto it. The specific epithet, ukrainica, refers to Ukraine, the country where both species are found. The specific epithet oblonga, feminine form of the Latin word oblongus meaning "elongate," refers to the elongated appearance of the second species, F. oblonga.

== See also ==
- List of Ediacaran genera
- Burykhia
- Yarnemia
