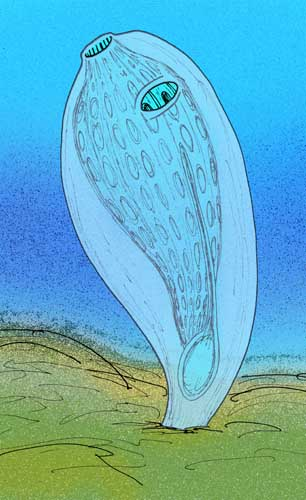
- Ausia fenestrata

Scientific classification
- Kingdom: Animalia
- Phylum: Chordata
- Subphylum: Tunicata
- Class: Ascidiacea (?)
- Family: †Ausiidae; Hahn and Pflug, 1985

Genera
- See text

= Ausiidae =

Ausiidae Temporal range: Ediacaran, 557–542 Ma

Extinct family of possible tunicates

Ausiidae is a proposed family of extinct animals, possibly ascidian tunicates.

== Genera ==
Ausiidae contains 4 genera.

- †Ausia Hahn and Pflug, 1985
- †Burykhia Fedonkin, Vickers-Rich, Swalla, Trusler & Hall, 2012
- †Finkoella Martyshyn and Uchman, 2021
- †Pharyngomorpha Martyshyn and Uchman, 2021

== See also ==
- Yarnemia, another possible Ediacaran tunicate
