= Khmeria =

Khmeria Temporal range: Middle Permian–Late Triassic

Scientific classification
- Kingdom: Animalia
- Phylum: Chordata
- Subphylum: Tunicata
- Class: Ascidiacea
- Order: †Khmeriamorpha
- Family: †Khmeriidae
- Genus: †Khmeria; Mansuy, 1914

Species
- Khmeria minima Wendt, 2018; Khmeria problematica Mansuy, 1914; Khmeria stolonifera Wendt, 2018

Extinct genus of tunicates

Khmeria is a fossil genus of controversial affiliation, known from the Middle Permian to Late Triassic. Originally described as putative anthozoan corals, it is now believed to be a genus of ascidian tunicates.

== History ==
Khmeria problematica was first described in 1914 by Henri Mansuy from Productus-bearing limestone in Cambodia. It was stated to be similar in morphology to operculate rugose corals, sharing features such as a curved, wrinkled body shape with a thin pedicle. However, such an affiliation was rejected due to the morphological variability exhibited by Khmeria and its less defined internal structure compared to these corals, and Khmeria was left unclassified. In 1932, specimens of K. problematica found in Nagato, Japan, provided visible evidence of internal deposits, including tabulae.

The genus Osium was described in 1930 from specimens discovered in the Sosio Valley of Sicily. It was later found to be a subjective junior synonym of Khmeria, and its only described species was reclassified as Khmeria importans. The name has since been argued to be invalid due to the poor quality of the description and the lack of surviving material.

The eponymous family Khmeriidae was erected in 1954 inside the order Rugosa. The rugosan affiliation of the genus was supported by the presence of tabulae and vesiculae, and a relationship with "cystiphylloid" corals was suggested.

In 2018, Khmeria minima was described from the Upper Triassic San Cassiano Formation in central Italy, alongside the putatively related Zardinisoma. At the same time, specimens of Khmeria problematica exhibiting colonial growth were reclassified as the separate species Khmeria stolonifera. Khmeria importans was reclassified as a synonym of K. problematica.

The same 2018 study argued for a tunicate identity for Khmeria, and established the order Khmeriamorpha as part of the class Ascidiacea. The structures previously identified as vesiculae were stated to be misidentified cement crystals. A rugosan affiliation was deemed unlikely based on the lack of septa and vesiculae, as well as the presence of multiple opercula and an aragonitic mineralogy in some species.

== Description ==
Khmeria is a bilaterally symmetric, sessile organism. It has a bivalved shell, made of a conical body covered by an operculum. Known specimens vary from 4 to 35 millimetres (0.16 to 1.38 in) in height and 4 to 17 millimetres (0.16 to 0.67 in) in width.

The shell grows along the margins, displaying concentric growth lines along both the body and operculum. The margins are covered in indented grooves, called crenellae by analogy with the similar structures present in crinoid ossicles. Internal compartments, or tabulae, are rare, but may form through endoskeletal biomineralization.
