= Khmeriamorpha =

Khmeriamorpha Temporal range: Late Permian–Late Triassic

Scientific classification
- Domain: Eukaryota
- Kingdom: Animalia
- Phylum: Chordata
- Subphylum: Tunicata
- Class: Ascidiacea
- Order: †Khmeriamorpha; Wendt, 2018

Genera and species
- Khmeria; K. minima; K. problematica; K. stolonifera; Zardinisoma; Z. cassianum; Z. japonicum; Z. pauciplacophorum; Z. polyplacophorum; Z. pyriforme

Extinct order of sea squirts

Khmeriamorpha is an order of extinct ascidians, characterized by a composite calcareous exoskeleton. It is known from the Late Permian to Late Triassic, and comprises the genera Khmeria and Zardinisoma.
