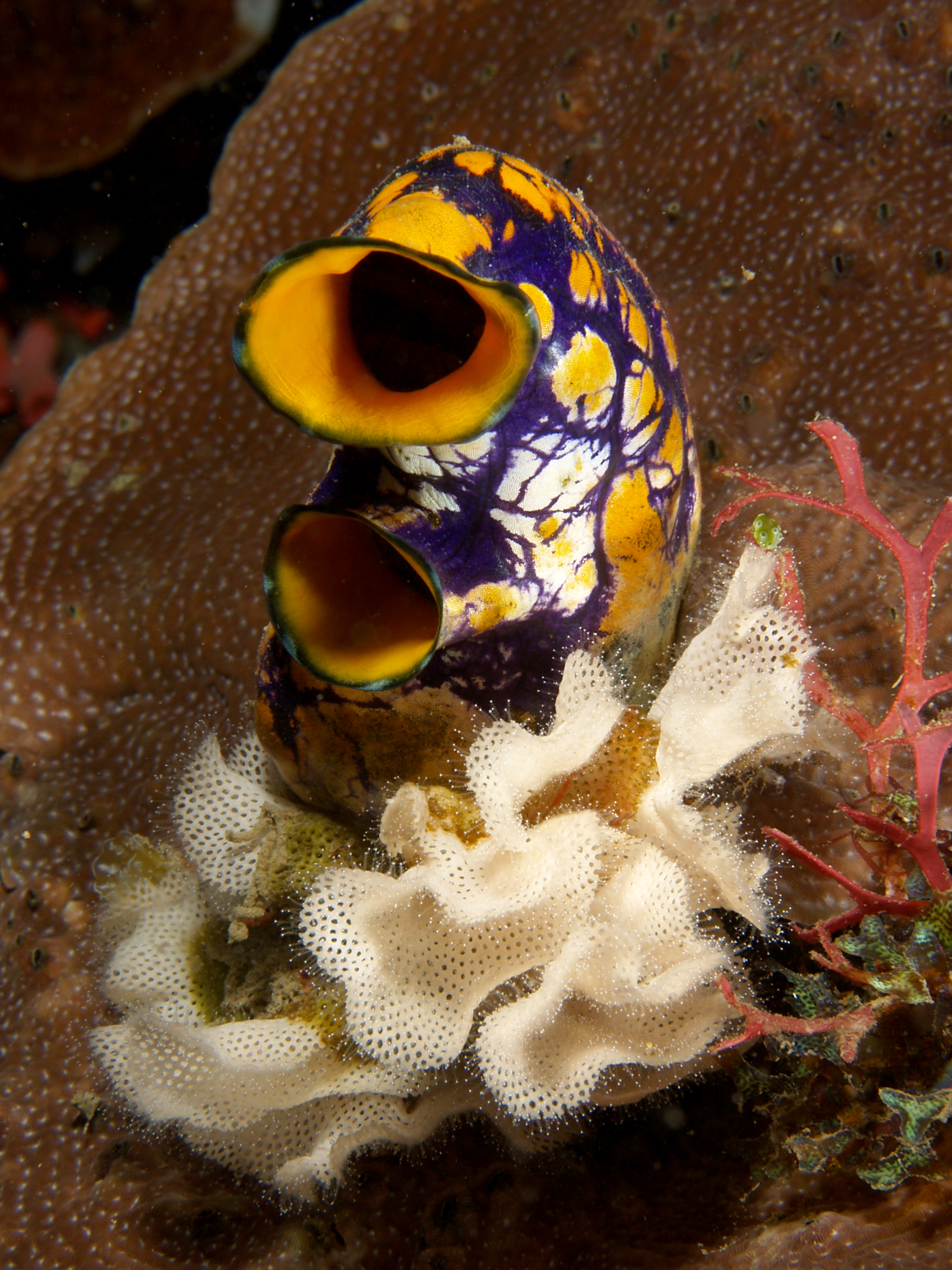
- Polycarpa aurata showing its pair of siphons
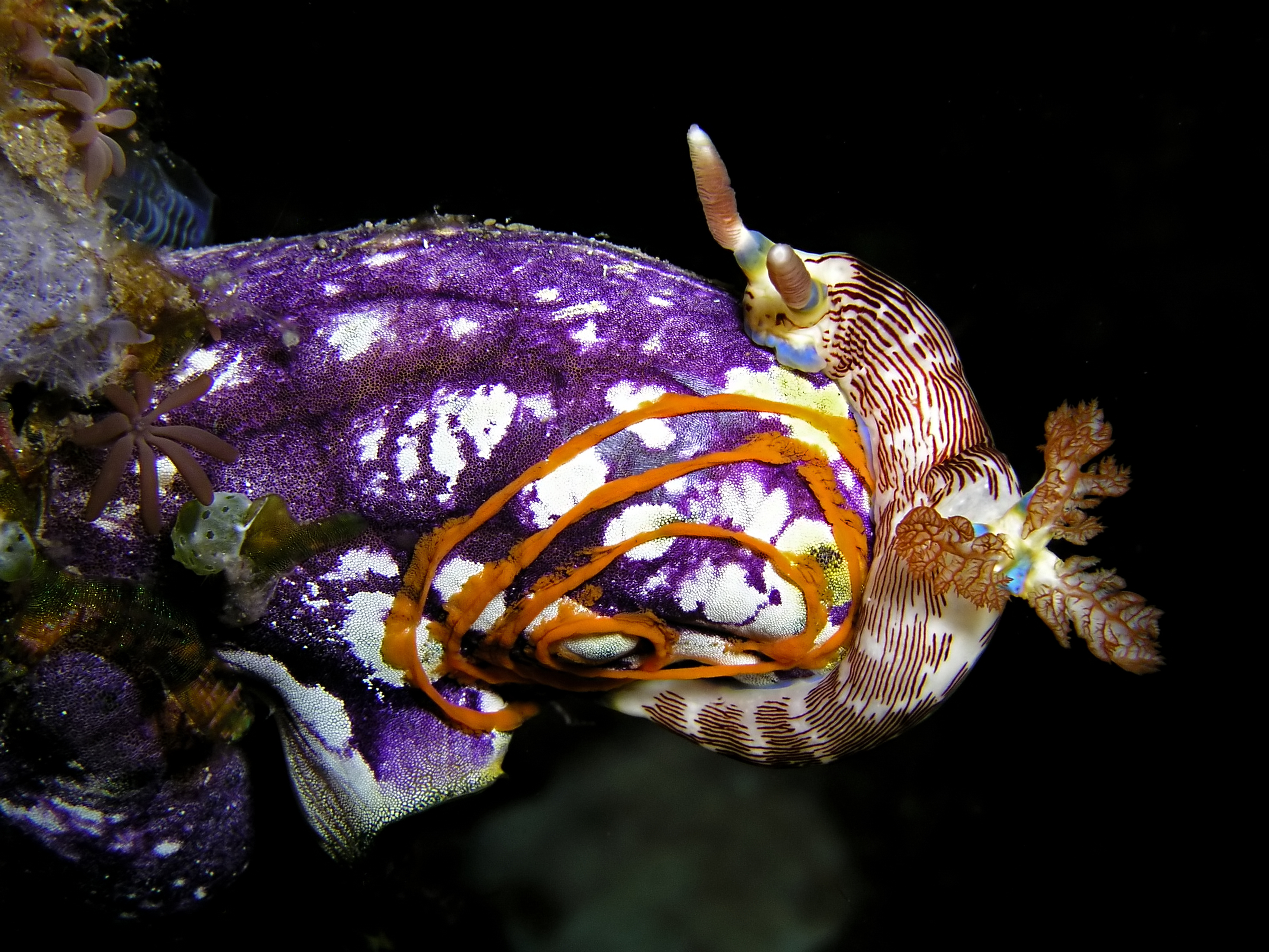
- Nudibranch (Nembrotha lineolata) laying an egg spiral on a Polycarpa aurata off the coast of Metinaro, East Timor.

Scientific classification
- Kingdom: Animalia
- Phylum: Chordata
- Subphylum: Tunicata
- Class: Ascidiacea
- Order: Stolidobranchia
- Family: Styelidae
- Genus: Polycarpa
- Species: P. aurata

Binomial name
- Polycarpa aurata (Quoy & Gaimard, 1834)

Synonyms
- Ascidia aurata Quoy & Gaimard, 1834; Pandocia aurata (Quoy & Gaimard, 1834); Pandocia botryllifera Michaelsen, 1912; Pandocia pizoni Hartmeyer, 1909; Polycarpa sulcata Herdman, 1882; Styela aurata (Quoy & Gaimard, 1834); Styela pneumonodes Sluiter, 1895; Styela psoloessa Sluiter, 1890

= Polycarpa aurata =

Species of sea squirt

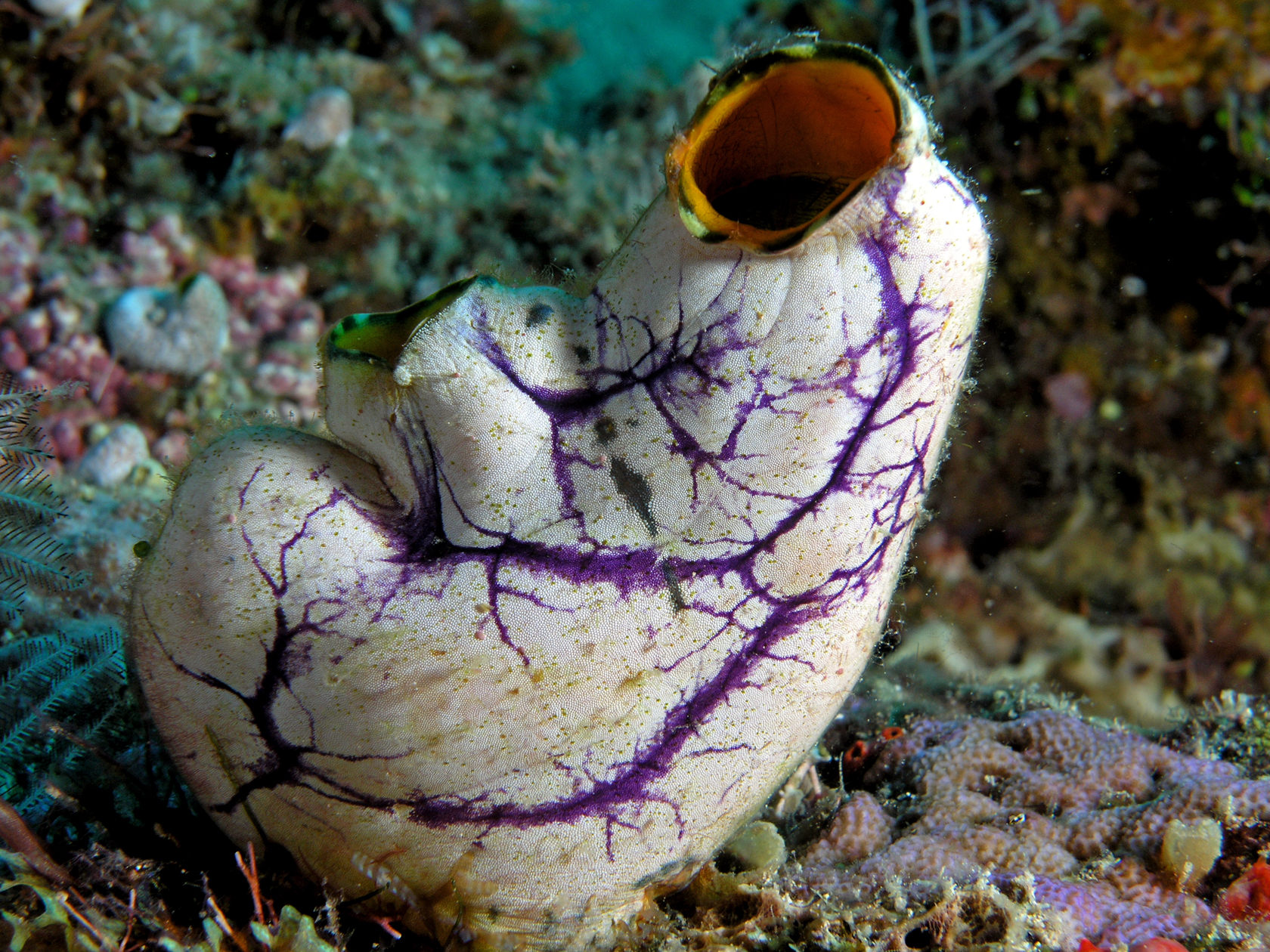
Gold-mouth sea squirt

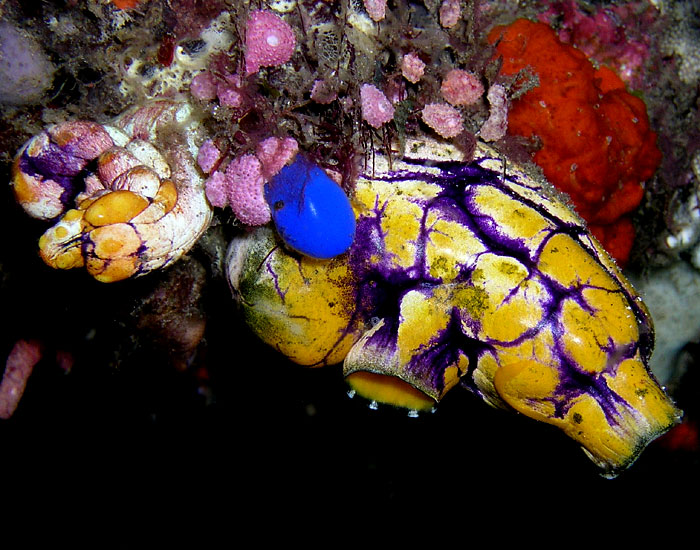
Polycarpa aurata, purple and yellow variant

Polycarpa aurata, also known as the ox heart ascidian, the gold-mouth sea squirt or the ink-spot sea squirt, is a species of tunicate in the family Styelidae.

== Description ==
Polycarpa aurata grows to a height of 5 to 15 cm (2 to 6 in). It has an urn-shaped, hollow body with two siphons, one at the top and the other on the side. The body colour of this tunicate is white with purple and orange patches and purple lines. The inside is yellow or orange, and is visible around the rim of the siphons.

== Distribution ==
This species is found in the tropical eastern Indian Ocean and the western Pacific Ocean. Its range includes the Philippines, Indonesia, Timor-Leste, and northern Australia. Its depth range is 5 to 50 m (16 to 164 ft).

== Biology ==
Tunicates feed by drawing water in through the branchial siphon at the top, filtering out phytoplankton, bacteria and other food particles, before expelling the water through the atrial siphon at the side. Hydroids and algae may grow on the outside of the tunicate and nudibranchs such as Nembrotha lineolata sometimes feed on them.
