= Ausia fenestrata =

Ausia fenestrata Temporal range: Ediacaran, 549–543 Ma

- Fossil and M. Fedonkin reconstruction of Ausia as sponge-like organism

Scientific classification
- Kingdom: Animalia
- Phylum: Chordata
- Subphylum: Tunicata
- Class: Ascidiacea (?)
- Family: †Ausiidae
- Genus: †Ausia; Hahn and Pflug, 1985
- Species: †A. fenestrata

Binomial name
- †Ausia fenestrata Hahn and Pflug, 1985

Genus of marine filter feeders

Ausia fenestrata is an Ediacaran fossil represented by only one specimen 5 cm long from the Nama Group, a Vendian to Cambrian group of stratigraphic sequences deposited in the Nama foreland basin in central and southern Namibia. It has similarity to Burykhia from Ediacaran (Vendian) siliciclastic sediments exposed on the Syuzma River of Arkhangelsk Oblast, northwest Russia. This fossil is of the form of an elongate bag-like sandstone cast (Nama-type preservation) tapering to a cone on one end. The surface of the fossil is covered with oval depressions ("windows") regularly spaced over the surface in the manner of concentric/parallel rows. The taxonomic identity of Ausia is unresolved.

== Interpretations ==
G. Hahn and H. D. Pflug suggested that Ausia is a pennatulacean coral from the family Veretillidae, but there are no signs of secondary polyps on the fossil, which are nonetheless represented in Hahn and Pflug's reconstruction. No veretillids are represented in the fossil record as far as is known.

Some researchers have assumed that these depressions are pores and interpreted Ausia as an ancestor of archeocyathans and other sponge-like organisms or true sponge. But Adolf Seilacher has argued that the "windows" are merely dimples.

Ausia may represent ascidians (sea squirts), an invertebrate group related to the chordates. Results of a new study of a Burykhia from Russia have shown a possible affinity of these organisms to the ascidians, which are urochordates. The Russian species is more than 90 mm across, and the rows of oval depressions are separated by structures which were probably grooves in the internal wall surface of the living organism. The study's authors interpret these fossils as the internal sand casts of a vast bag-like cavity, possibly a pharynx or branchial basket. The animals represented by these two genera were thought to live in the shallow waters of an epicontinental sea, slightly more than 555-548 million years ago, and the authors feel this is probably the oldest evidence of the chordate lineage of metazoans.

Jerzy Dzik has suggested that Ausia bears some similarity to the halkieriids, and resembles the body plan that might be expected of halkieriid ancestors under the coeloscleritophoran hypothesis.

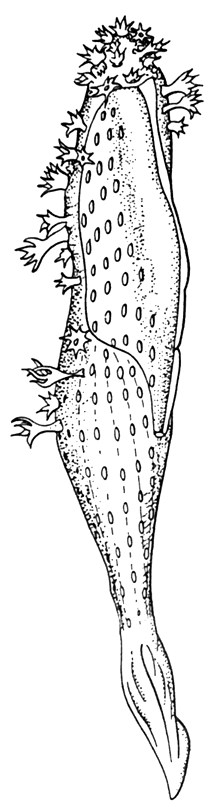
Hahn and Pflug reconstruction of Ausia as a pennatulacean

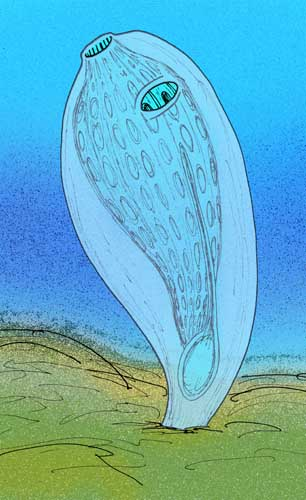
Reconstructed as a tunicate

== See also ==
- List of Ediacaran genera
- Yarnemia, another Ediacaran thought to be a tunicate.
