= Chordate genomics =

Study of the evolution of the chordate clade

Chordate genomics is the study of the evolution of the chordate clade based on a comparison of the genomes of several species within the clade. The field depends on whole genome data (the entire DNA sequence) of organisms. It uses comparisons of synteny blocks, chromosome translocation, and other genomic rearrangements to determine the evolutionary history of the clade, and to reconstruct the genome of the founding species.

== Results ==
=== Phylogeny ===
The deep branching of chordate phylogeny has been clarified by chordate genomics. Chordate genomics demonstrates that the Lancelets are the most basal living clade within the chordates, while the Tunicates are the sister clade to the Craniata.

=== Synteny ===
A comparison of the genomes of the Lancelet Branchiostoma floridae, a fish, the chicken Gallus gallus, and humans Homo sapiens revealed extensive macro-synteny with little or no micro-synteny. That is, across the Chordate clade the same genes are found clustered near each other although the order of the genes within the clusters has been shuffled. There are 135 identifiable segments in the human genome which retain synteny with the ancestral chordate karyotype.

Synteny analysis indicates that there were 17 chromosomes in the last common ancestor to the Chordates.

=== Genome Duplication ===
Multiple lines of experimental evidence strongly suggest that twice in the lineage leading to the teleost fish the ancestral Chordate genome was duplicated. A comparison of the genomes of the Lancelet Branchiostoma floridae, the Tunicates Ciona intestinalis and Oikopleura dioica, the lamprey Petromyzon marinus, the fish Fugu rubripes and Gasterosteus aculeatus, the chicken Gallus gallus, and human Homo sapiens confirmed that two whole-genome duplications occurred in the early history of the Vertebrata clade.
