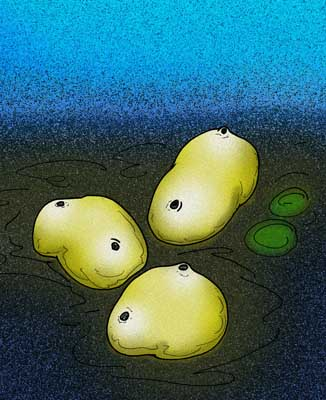
- Reconstruction as a tunicate-like animal

Scientific classification
- Kingdom: Animalia
- Phylum: Chordata
- Subphylum: Tunicata (?)
- Genus: †Yarnemia; Nesov in Chistyakov et al., 1984
- Species: †Y. ascidiformis

Binomial name
- †Yarnemia ascidiformis Nesov in Chistyakov et al., 1984

= Yarnemia =

Yarnemia Temporal range: Late Ediacaran ~552–550 Ma

Extinct genus of possible tunicates

Yarnemia ascidiformis is a fossil tentatively classified as a tunicate. If this classification is correct, it would significantly extend the range of the tunicate fossil record from the Cambrian back into the Ediacaran.

== Discovery and name ==
The holotype fossil of Yarnemia was found from the Ustʹ Pinega Formation between 1976 and 1978, and described in 1984.

The generic name Yarnemia comes from the village of Yarnema near which the first specimens were found. The specific epithet, ascidiformis, refers to the likeness to ascidians.

== Description ==
Yarnemia ascidiformis is a possible tunicate, growing up to 30 mm (1.2 in) in length, with the standard oblong body and two openings, or siphons, on the top of the body to allow water to flow through them.

== See also ==
Other Ediacaran biota tentatively identified as tunicates include

- Ausia fenestrata
- Burykhia hunti
