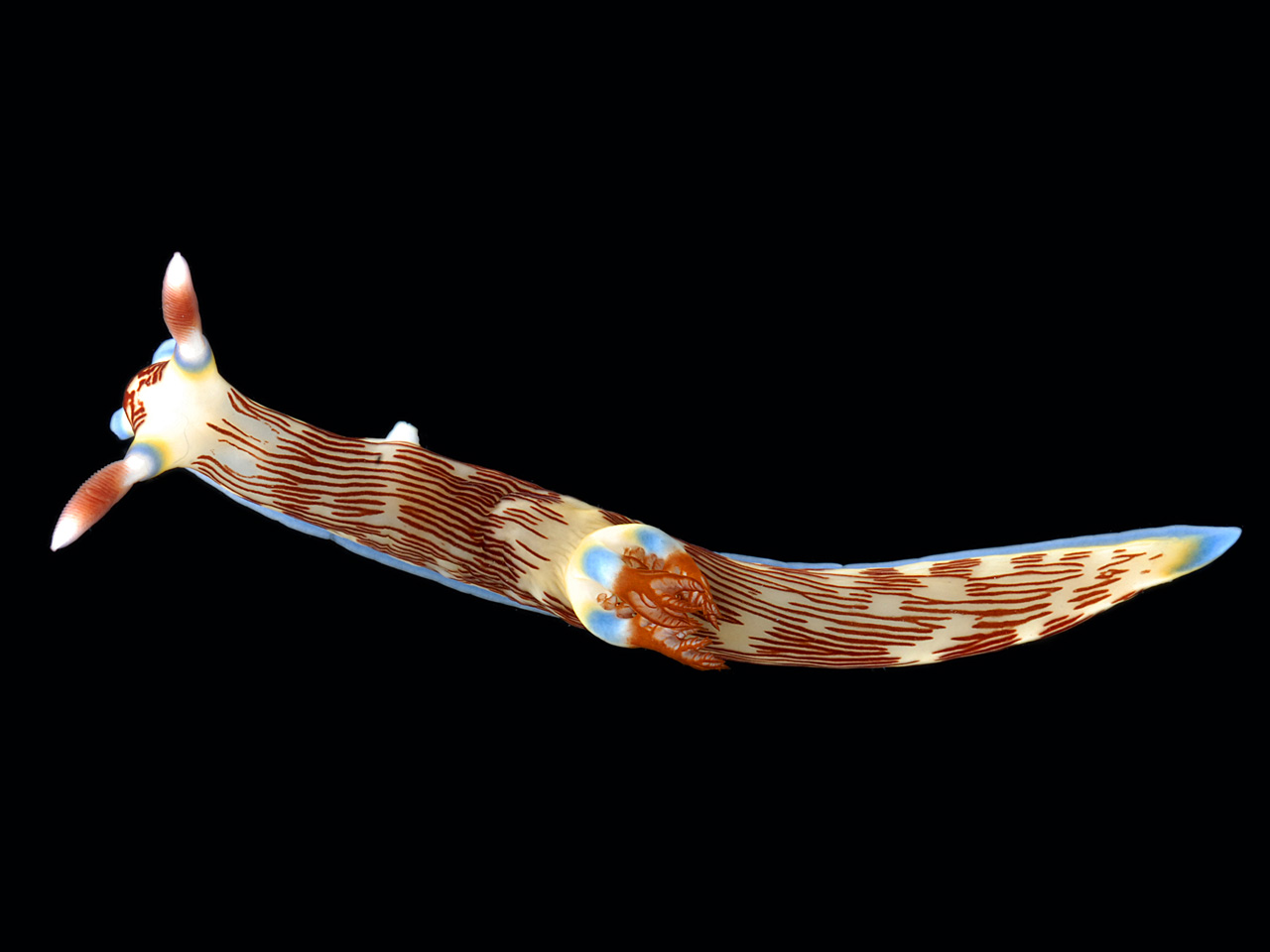
- At Diani Beach, Kenya

Scientific classification
- Kingdom: Animalia
- Phylum: Mollusca
- Class: Gastropoda
- Order: Nudibranchia
- Family: Polyceridae
- Genus: Nembrotha
- Species: N. lineolata

Binomial name
- Nembrotha lineolata Bergh, 1905

= Nembrotha lineolata =

Species of gastropod

Nembrotha lineolata is a species of nudibranch, a sea slug, a marine gastropod mollusk in the family Polyceridae. It is found in shallow water in the Indo-Pacific. It was first described in 1905 by the Danish malacologist Rudolph Bergh. The type locality is Selayar Island, Indonesia.

== Description ==
Nembrotha lineolata grows to a length of about 70 millimetres (2.8 in). The body is slender with a rounded head at one end and a pointed tip to the foot at the other. The exterior of the body is covered with longitudinal wrinkles and there is no sharp demarcation between the dorsal surface and the lateral surfaces. The oral tentacles are thick and long and the large conical rhinophores bear about thirty lamellae and can be retracted. The three large pinnate branchial plumes on the dorsal surface are non-retractile and the anus is located between them. The colouring of this nudibranch is variable across the animal's range. The body colour is creamy-white with narrow longitudinal lines, some broken, in varying shades of brown. Sometimes these lines merge in places giving transverse bands of colour. There is a blue or purple stripe running round the margin of the foot and often a yellow one as well. The oral tentacles are blue or purple with a yellow band and the rhinophores are red (sometimes yellow in the Comoros Islands) with blue or purple sheaths.

== Distribution ==
This is a widespread Indo-Pacific species occurring from the East African coast to Australia, Fiji and the Solomon Islands. Its range includes Bali, Fiji, Palau, Papua New Guinea, Malaysia, Japan, Kerama Islands, Ryukyu Islands, the Philippines, Australia, the Indian Ocean, the Seychelles, Tanzania and the Comoros Islands.

== Biology ==
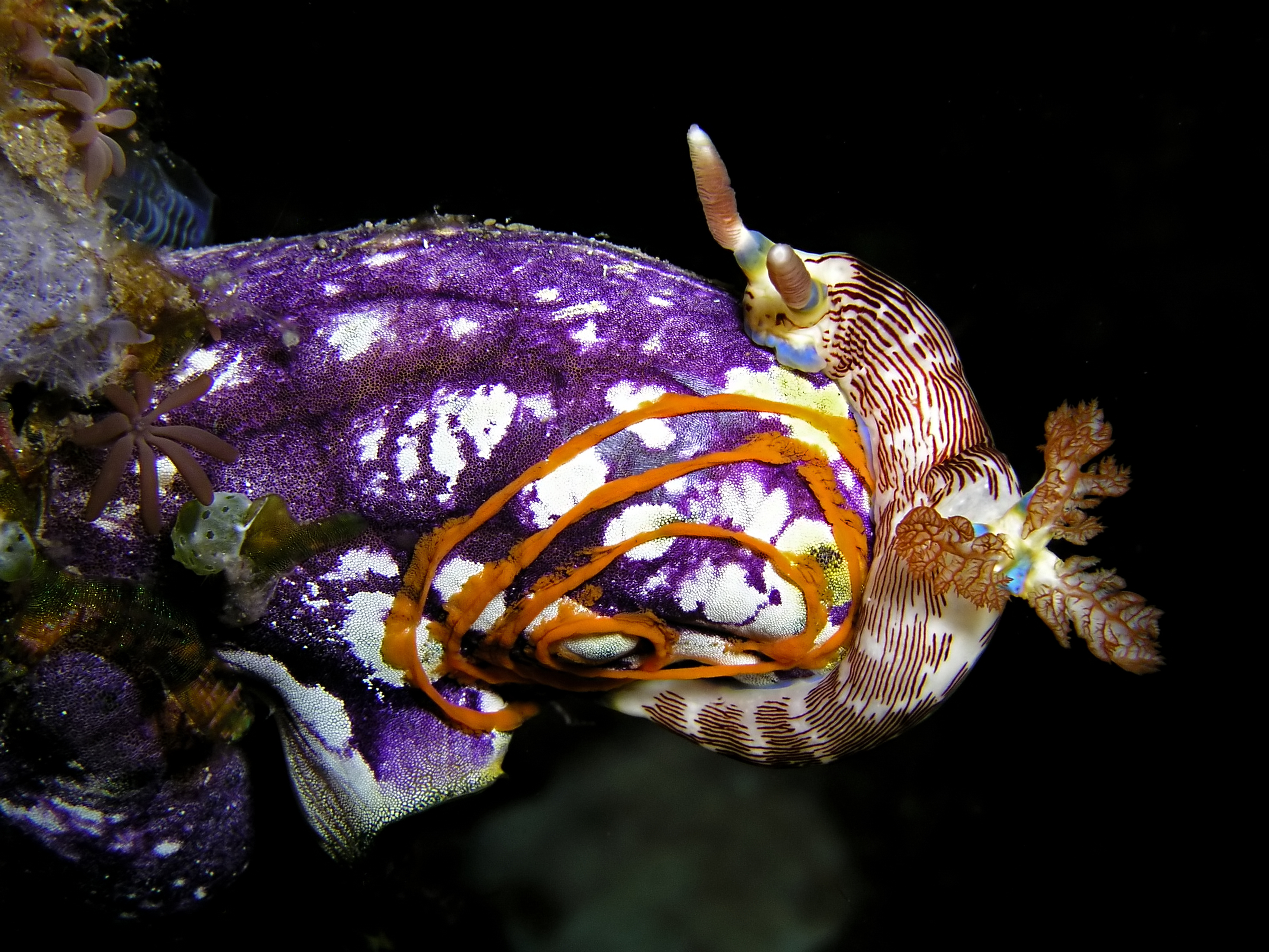
Nembrotha lineolata laying an egg spiral on a sea squirt (Polycarpa aurata)

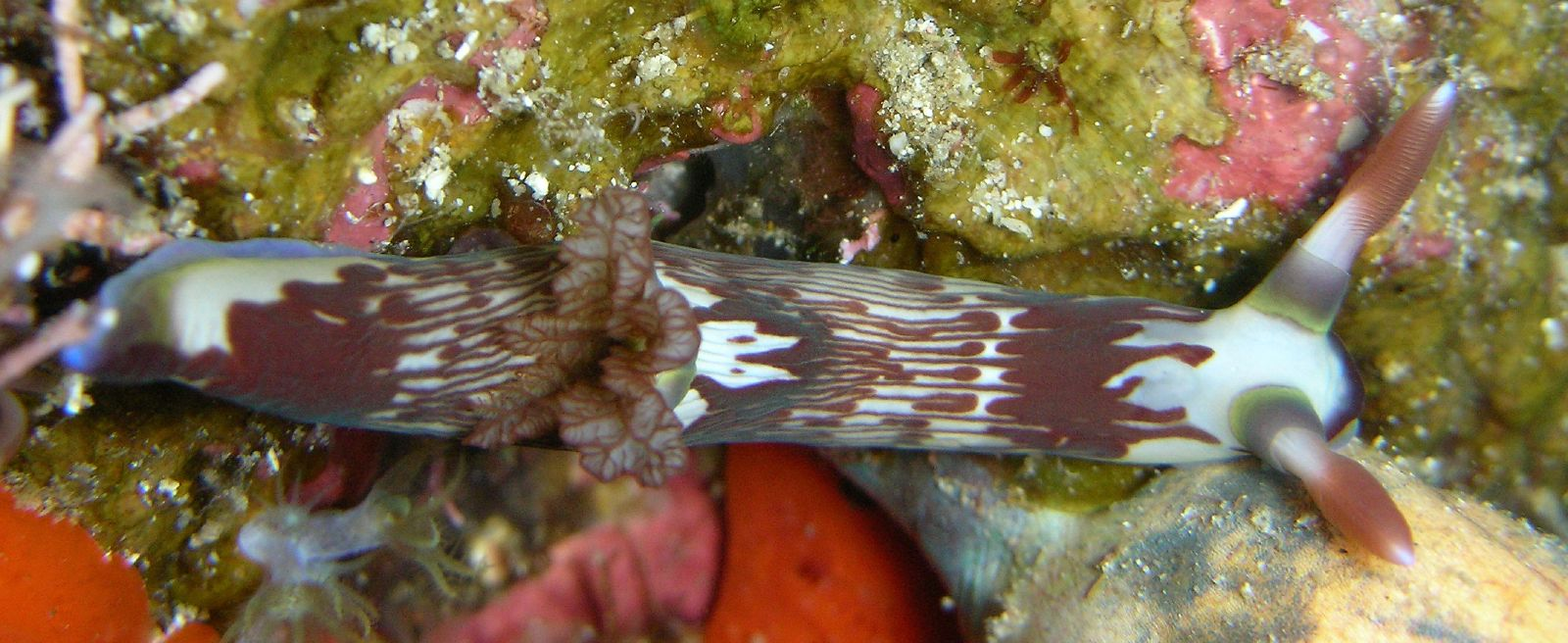
Nembrotha lineolata

Nembrotha lineolata has been observed feeding on tunicates such as Oxycorynia fascicularis, Clavelina spp. and Rhopalaea spp.. It can insert its extensible oral tube through the tunicate's siphon and suck out the soft interior.

It lays its eggs in a yellowish-brown spiral ribbon and it is likely that the larvae that hatch out of these are free-swimming veliger larvae and form part of the plankton. Known predators of nudibranchs include fish, crabs, sea spiders and polychaete worms. There have been two instances when a sea anemone in the Edwardsiidae family has been observed attempting to feed on nudibranchs. In one attack on Nembrotha lineolata, the sea slug flinched whenever it was touched by a tentacle but oozed a great deal of mucus and managed to struggle out of reach. It is unclear whether sea anemones normally prey on sea slugs or whether these are unusual occurrences.
