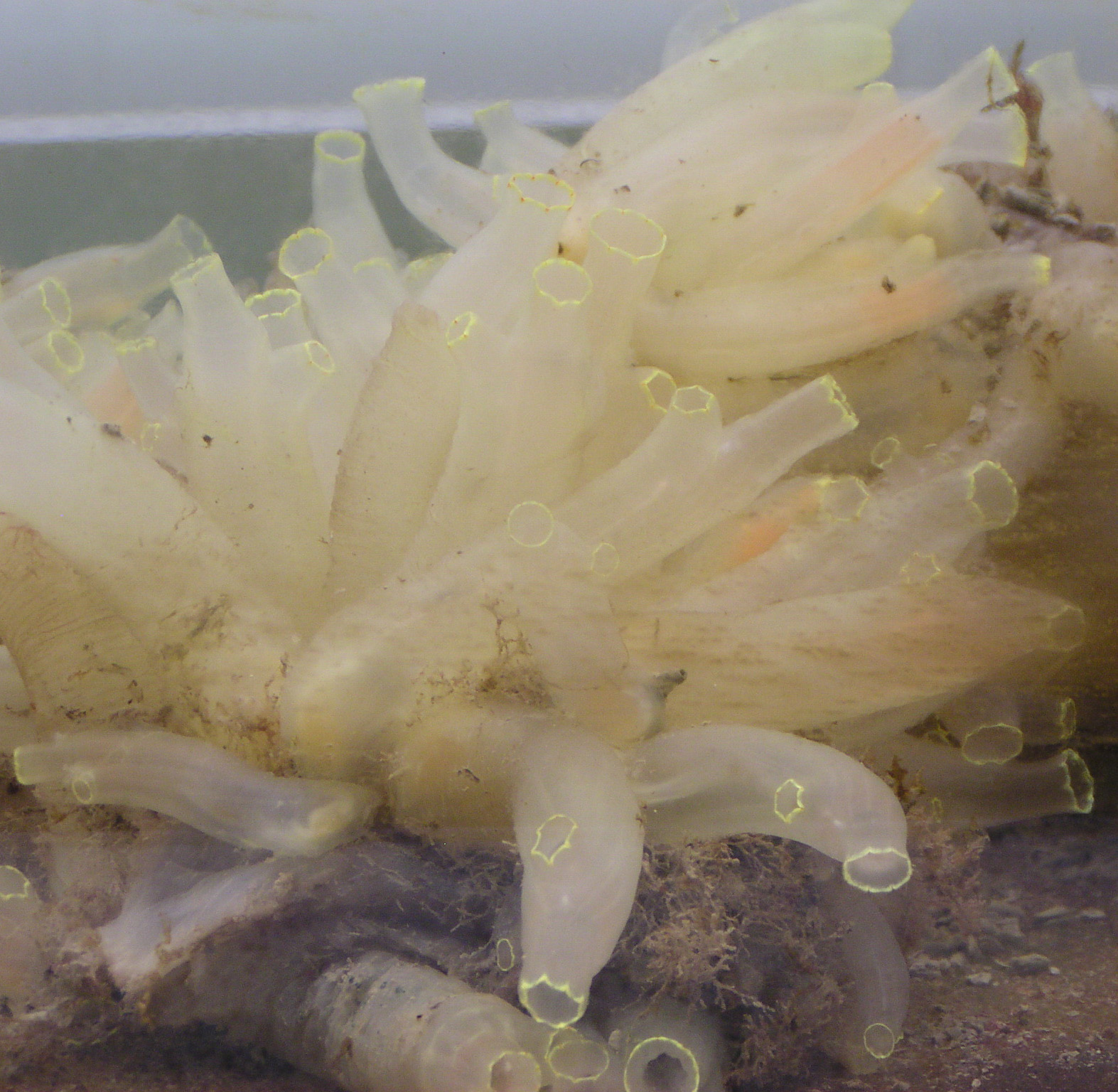
- Ciona intestinalis, commonly known as the vase tunicate or as a sea squirt

Scientific classification
- Kingdom: Animalia
- Phylum: Chordata
- Subphylum: Tunicata
- Clade: Acopa
- Class: Ascidiacea; Blainville, 1824

Groups included
- Aplousobranchia Lahille, 1887; Phlebobranchia Lahille, 1887; Stolidobranchia Lahille, 1886; †Cassianomorpha Wendt, 2020; †Cheungkongella? Shu et al., 2001; †Khmeriamorpha Wendt, 2018; †Ausiidae?; †Ausia?; †Burykhia?; †Finkoella?; †Pharyngomorpha?

Cladistically included but traditionally excluded taxa
- Thaliacea Nielsen, 1995; Appendicularia? Lahille, 1890

= Ascidiacea =

Ascidiacea Temporal range: Cambrian Stage 3–Present, 518–0 Ma

Paraphyletic class of tunicates comprising sea squirts

Ascidiacea, commonly known as the ascidians or sea squirts, is a paraphyletic class in the subphylum Tunicata of sac-like marine invertebrate filter feeders. Ascidians are characterized by a tough outer test or "tunic" made of the polysaccharide cellulose.

Ascidians are found all over the world, usually in shallow water with salinities over 2.5%. While members of the Thaliacea (salps, doliolids and pyrosomes) and Appendicularia (larvaceans) swim freely like plankton, sea squirts are sessile animals after their larval phase: they then remain firmly attached to their substrate, such as rocks and shells.

There are 2,300 species of ascidians and three main types: solitary ascidians, social ascidians that form clumped communities by attaching at their bases, and compound ascidians that consist of many small individuals (each individual is called a zooid) forming large colonies.

Sea squirts feed by taking in water through a tube, the oral siphon. The water enters the mouth and pharynx, flows through mucus-covered gill slits (also called pharyngeal stigmata) into a water chamber called the atrium, then exits through the atrial siphon.

Some authors now include the thaliaceans in Ascidiacea, making it monophyletic.

== Anatomy ==
Sea squirts are rounded or cylindrical animals ranging from about 0.5 to 10 cm (0.20 to 3.94 in) in size. One end of the body is always firmly fixed to rock, coral, or some similar solid surface. The lower surface is pitted or ridged, and in some species has root-like extensions that help the animal grip the surface. The body wall is covered by a smooth thick tunic, which is often quite rigid. The tunic consists of cellulose, along with proteins and calcium salts. Unlike the shells of molluscs, the tunic is composed of living tissue and often has its own blood supply. In some colonial species, the tunics of adjacent individuals are fused into a single structure.

The upper surface of the animal, opposite to the part gripping the substratum, has two openings, or siphons. When removed from the water, the animal often violently expels water from these siphons, hence the common name of "sea squirt". The body itself can be divided into up to three regions, although these are not clearly distinct in most species. The pharyngeal region contains the pharynx, while the abdomen contains most of the other bodily organs, and the postabdomen contains the heart and gonads. In many sea squirts, the postabdomen, or even the entire abdomen, is absent, with its respective organs being located more anteriorly.

As its name implies, the pharyngeal region is occupied mainly by the pharynx. The large buccal siphon opens into the pharynx, acting like a mouth. The pharynx itself is ciliated and contains numerous perforations, or stigmata, arranged in a grid-like pattern around its circumference. The beating of the cilia sucks water through the siphon, and then through the stigmata. A long ciliated groove, or endostyle, runs along one side of the pharynx, and a projecting ridge along the other. The endostyle may be homologous with the thyroid gland of vertebrates, despite its differing function.

The pharynx is surrounded by an atrium, through which water is expelled through a second, usually smaller, siphon. Cords of connective tissue cross the atrium to maintain the general shape of the body. The outer body wall consists of connective tissue, muscle fibres, and a simple epithelium directly underlying the tunic.

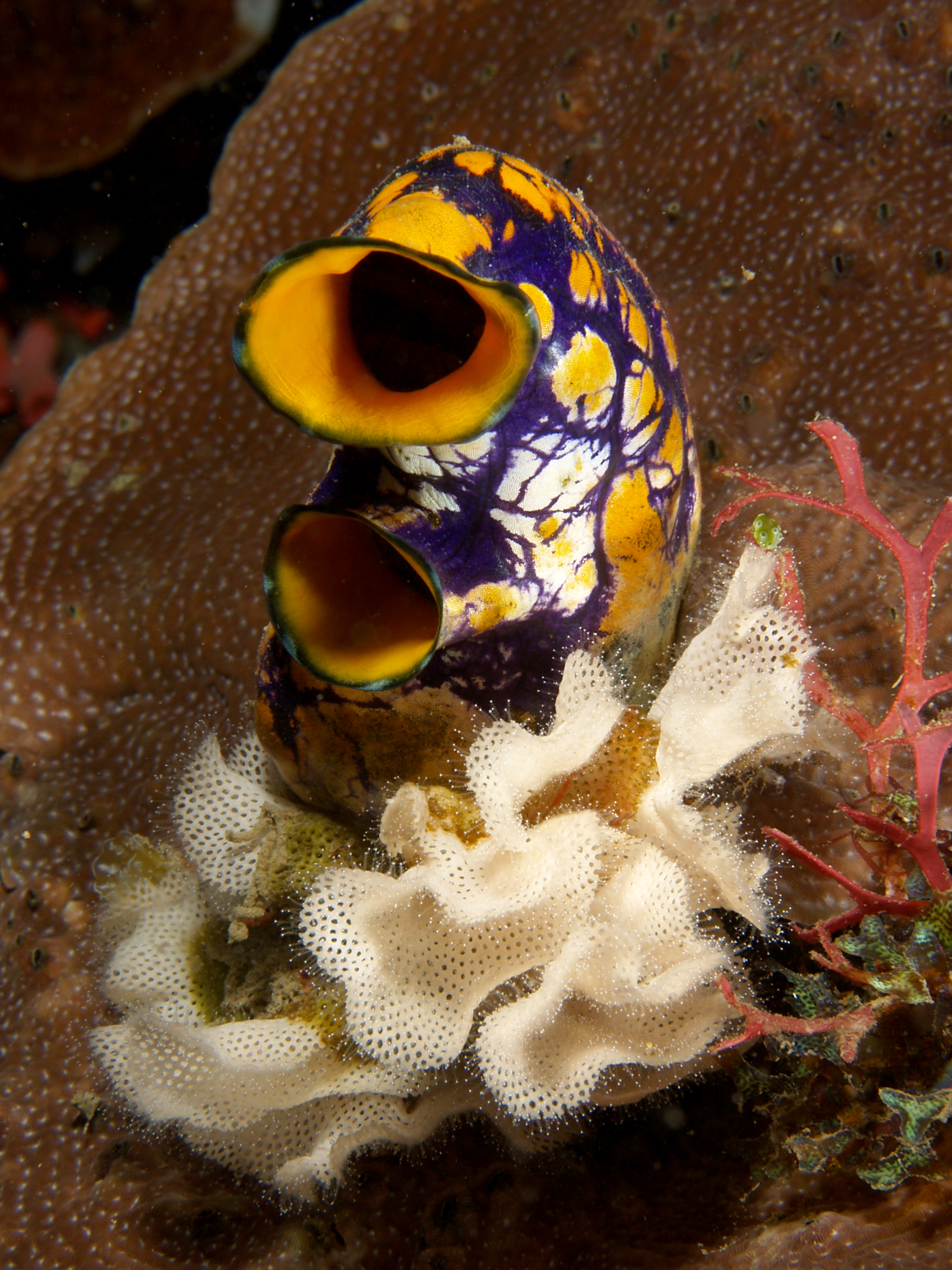
The colorful Polycarpa aurata sits in a bed of white bryozoans (Triphyllozoon inornatum).

=== Digestive system ===
The pharynx forms the first part of the digestive system. The endostyle produces a supply of mucus which is then passed into the rest of the pharynx by the beating of flagella along its margins. The mucus then flows in a sheet across the surface of the pharynx, trapping planktonic food particles as they pass through the stigmata, and is collected in the ridge on the dorsal surface. The ridge bears a groove along one side, which passes the collected food downwards and into the oesophageal opening at the base of the pharynx.

The esophagus runs downwards to a stomach in the abdomen, which secretes enzymes that digest the food. An intestine runs upwards from the stomach parallel to the oesophagus and eventually opens, through a short rectum and anus, into a cloaca just below the atrial siphon. In some highly developed colonial species, clusters of individuals may share a single cloaca, with all the atrial siphons opening into it, although the buccal siphons all remain separate. A series of glands lie on the outer surface of the intestine, opening through collecting tubules into the stomach, although their precise function is unclear.

=== Circulatory system ===
The heart is a curved muscular tube lying in the postabdomen, or close to the stomach. Each end opens into a single vessel, one running to the endostyle, and the other to the dorsal surface of the pharynx. The vessels are connected by a series of sinuses, through which the blood flows. Additional sinuses run from that on the dorsal surface, supplying blood to the visceral organs, and smaller vessels commonly run from both sides into the tunic. Nitrogenous waste, in the form of ammonia, is excreted directly from the blood through the walls of the pharynx, and expelled through the atrial siphon.

Unusually, the heart of sea squirts alternates the direction in which it pumps blood every three to four minutes. There are two excitatory areas, one at each end of the heart, with first one being dominant, to push the blood through the ventral vessel, and then the other, pushing it dorsally.

There are four different types of blood cell: lymphocytes, phagocytic amoebocytes, nephrocytes and morula cells. The nephrocytes collect waste material such as uric acid and accumulate it in renal vesicles close to the digestive tract. The morula cells help to form the tunic, and can often be found within the tunic substance itself. In some species, the morula cells possess pigmented reducing agents containing iron (hemoglobin), giving the blood a red colour, or vanadium (hemovanadin) giving it a green colour. In that case that cell is also referred to as a vanadocyte.

=== Nervous system ===
The ascidian central nervous system is formed from a plate that rolls up to form a neural tube. The number of cells within the central nervous system is very small. The neural tube is composed of the sensory vesicle, the neck, the visceral or tail ganglion, and the caudal nerve cord. The anteroposterior regionalization of the neural tube in ascidians is comparable to that in vertebrates.

Although there is no true brain, the largest ganglion is located in the connective tissue between the two siphons, and sends nerves throughout the body. Beneath this ganglion lies an exocrine gland that empties into the pharynx. The gland is formed from the nerve tube, and is therefore homologous to the spinal cord of vertebrates.

Sea squirts lack special sense organs, although the body wall incorporates numerous individual receptors for touch, chemoreception, and the detection of light.

== Life history ==
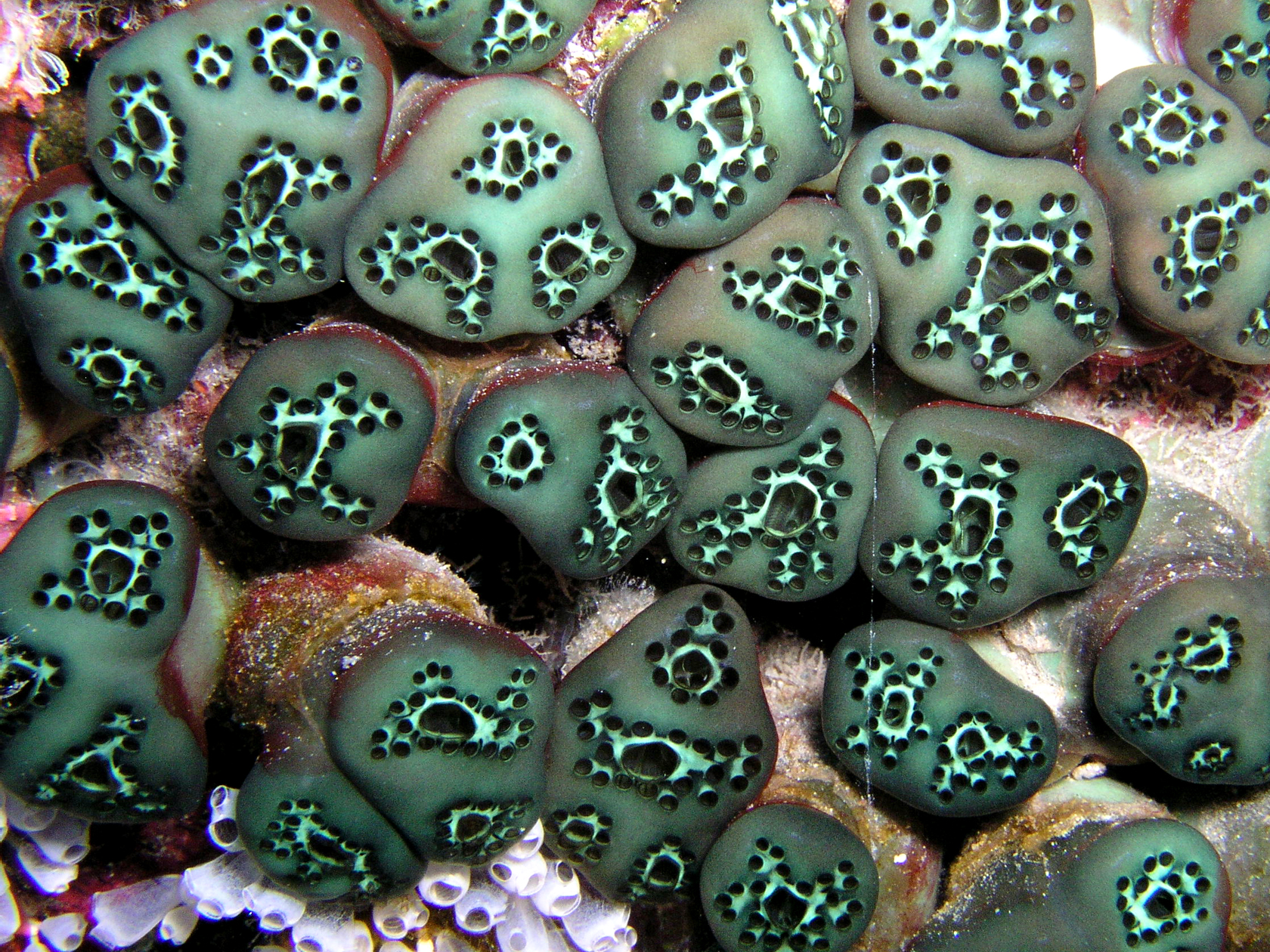
A tunicate group from East Timor

Almost all ascidians are hermaphrodites and conspicuous mature ascidians are sessile. The gonads are located in the abdomen or postabdomen, and include one testis and one ovary, each of which opens via a duct into the cloaca. Broadly speaking, the ascidians can be divided into species which exist as independent animals (the solitary ascidians) and those which are interdependent (the colonial ascidians). Different species of ascidians can have markedly different reproductive strategies, with colonial forms having mixed modes of reproduction.

Solitary ascidians release many eggs from their atrial siphons; external fertilization in seawater takes place with the coincidental release of sperm from other individuals. A fertilized egg spends 12 hours to a few days developing into a free-swimming tadpole-like larva, which then takes no more than 36 hours to settle and metamorphose into a juvenile.

As a general rule, the larva possesses a long tail, containing muscles, a hollow dorsal nerve tube and a notochord, both features clearly indicative of the animal's chordate affinities. One group though, the molgulid ascidians, have evolved tailless species on at least four separate occasions, and even direct development. A notochord is formed early in development and always consists of a row of exactly 40 cells. The nerve tube enlarges in the main body, and will eventually become the cerebral ganglion of the adult. The tunic develops early in embryonic life and extends to form a fin along the tail in the larva. The larva also has a statocyst and a pigmented cup above the mouth, which opens into a pharynx lined with small clefts opening into a surrounding atrium. The mouth and anus are originally at opposite ends of the animal, with the mouth only moving to its final (posterior) position during metamorphosis.

The larva selects and settles on appropriate surfaces using receptors sensitive to light, orientation to gravity, and Touch stimuli. When its anterior end touches a surface, papillae (small, finger-like nervous projections) secrete an adhesive for attachment. Adhesive secretion prompts an irreversible metamorphosis: various organs (such as the larval tail and fins) are lost while others rearrange to their adult positions, the pharynx enlarges, and organs called ampullae grow from the body to permanently attach the animal to the substratum. The siphons of the juvenile ascidian become orientated to optimise current flow through the feeding apparatus. Sexual maturity can be reached in as little as a few weeks. Since the larva is more advanced than its adult, this type of metamorphosis is called 'retrogressive metamorphosis'. This feature is a landmark for the 'theory of retrogressive metamorphosis or ascidian larva theory'; the true chordates are hypothesized to have evolved from sexually mature larvae.

== Direct development in ascidians ==
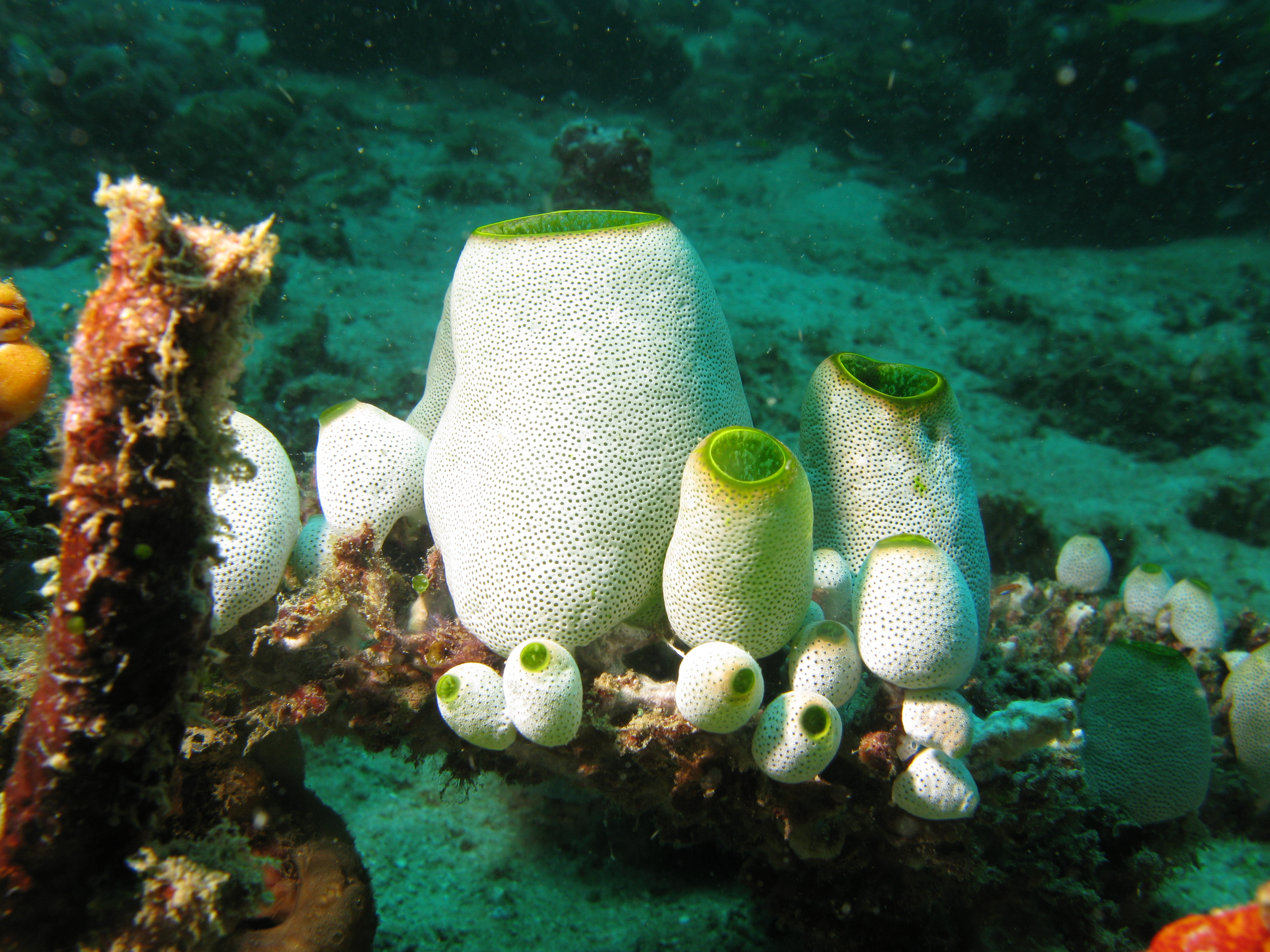
A colony of Didemnum molle, with budding juveniles

Some ascidians, especially in Molgulidae family, have direct development in which the embryo develops directly into the juvenile without developing a tailed larva.

== Colonial species ==
Colonial ascidians reproduce both asexually and sexually. Colonies can survive for decades. An ascidian colony consists of individual elements called zooids. Zooids within a colony are usually genetically identical and some have a shared circulation.

The colonial forms are as follows:

Order Aplousobranchia: The last common ancestor was probably colonial, as all species in this order forms colonies through epicardial budding, except for the two solitary genera Pseudorhopalaea and Rhopalaea in the family Diazonidae, which evolved into solitary forms secondarily.

Order Phlebobranchia: A solitary order, except for the family Perophoridae (genera Ecteinascidia and Perophora) and genus Plurella. The ability to form colonies evolved twice; once in Plurella and once in Perophoridae.

Order Stolidobranchia: Colonial species are only found in family Styelidae, where coloniality evolved twice; once in the common ancestor of genera Botryllinae and Polyzoinae and once in genus Polyandrocarpa.

=== Sexual reproduction ===
Different colonial ascidian species produce sexually derived offspring by one of two dispersal strategies – colonial species are either broadcast spawners (long-range dispersal) or philopatric (very short-range dispersal). Broadcast spawners release sperm and ova into the water column and fertilization occurs near to the parent colonies. Some species are also viviparous. Resultant zygotes develop into microscopic larvae that may be carried great distances by oceanic currents. The larvae of sessile forms which survive eventually settle and complete maturation on the substratum- then they may bud asexually to form a colony of zooids.

The picture is more complicated for the philopatrically dispersed ascidians: sperm from a nearby colony (or from a zooid of the same colony) enter the atrial siphon and fertilization takes place within the atrium. Embryos are then brooded within the atrium where embryonic development takes place: this results in macroscopic tadpole-like larvae. When mature, these larvae exit the atrial siphon of the adult and then settle close to the parent colony (often within meters). The combined effect of short sperm range and philopatric larval dispersal results in local population structures of closely related individuals/inbred colonies. Generations of colonies which are restricted in dispersal are thought to accumulate adaptions to local conditions, thereby providing advantages over newcomers.

Trauma or predation often results in fragmentation of a colony into subcolonies. Subsequent zooid replication can lead to coalescence and circulatory fusion of the subcolonies. Closely related colonies which are proximate to each other may also fuse if they coalesce and if they are histocompatible. Ascidians were among the first animals to be able to immunologically distinguish self from non-self as a mechanism to prevent unrelated colonies from fusing to them and parasitizing them.

=== Fertilization ===
Sea squirt eggs are surrounded by a fibrous vitelline coat and a layer of follicle cells that produce sperm-attracting substances. In fertilization, the sperm passes through the follicle cells and binds to glycosides on the vitelline coat. The sperm's mitochondria are left behind as the sperm enters and drives through the coat; this translocation of the mitochondria might provide the necessary force for penetration. The sperm swims through the perivitelline space, finally reaching the egg plasma membrane and entering the egg. This prompts rapid modification of the vitelline coat, through processes such as the egg's release of glycosidase into the seawater, so no more sperm can bind and polyspermy is avoided. After fertilization, free calcium ions are released in the egg cytoplasm in waves, mostly from internal stores. The temporary large increase in calcium concentration prompts the physiological and structural changes of development.

The dramatic rearrangement of egg cytoplasm following fertilization, called ooplasmic segregation, determines the dorsoventral and anteroposterior axes of the embryo. There are at least three types of sea squirt egg cytoplasm: ectoplasm containing vesicle (biology) and fine particles, endoderm containing yolk platelets, and myoplasm containing pigment granules, mitochondria, and endoplasmic reticulum. In the first phase of ooplasmic segregation, the myoplasmic actin-filament network contracts to rapidly move the peripheral cytoplasm (including the myoplasm) to the vegetal pole, which marks the Dorsum (biology) side of the embryo. In the second phase, the myoplasm moves to the subequatorial zone and extends into a crescent, which marks the future posterior of the embryo. The ectoplasm with the zygote nucleus ends up at the animal hemisphere while the endoplasm ends up in the vegetal hemisphere.

=== Promotion of out-crossing ===
Ciona intestinalis is a hermaphrodite that releases sperm and eggs into the surrounding seawater almost simultaneously. It is self-sterile, and thus has been used for studies on the mechanism of self-incompatibility. Self/non-self-recognition molecules play a key role in the process of interaction between sperm and the vitelline coat of the egg. It appears that self/non-self recognition in ascidians such as C. intestinalis is mechanistically similar to self-incompatibility systems in flowering plants. Self-incompatibility promotes out-crossing, and thus provides the adaptive advantage at each generation of masking deleterious recessive mutations (i.e. genetic complementation).

Ciona savignyi is highly self-fertile. However, non-self sperm out-compete self-sperm in fertilization competition assays. Gamete recognition is not absolute allowing some self-fertilization. It was speculated that self-incompatibility evolved to avoid inbreeding depression, but that selfing ability was retained to allow reproduction at low population density.

Botryllus schlosseri is a colonial tunicate able to reproduce both sexually and asexually. B. schlosseri is a sequential (protogynous) hermaphrodite, and in a colony, eggs are ovulated about two days before the peak of sperm emission. Thus self-fertilization is avoided, and cross-fertilization is favored. Although avoided, self-fertilization is still possible in B. schlosseri. Self-fertilized eggs develop with a substantially higher frequency of anomalies during cleavage than cross-fertilized eggs (23% vs. 1.6%). Also, a significantly lower percentage of larvae derived from self-fertilized eggs metamorphose, and the growth of the colonies derived from their metamorphosis is significantly lower. These findings suggest that self-fertilization gives rise to inbreeding depression associated with developmental deficits that are likely caused by expression of deleterious recessive mutations.

=== Asexual reproduction ===
Many colonial sea squirts are also capable of asexual reproduction, although the means of doing so are highly variable between different families. In the simplest forms, the members of the colony are linked only by rootlike projections from their undersides known as stolons. Buds containing food storage cells can develop within the stolons and, when sufficiently separated from the 'parent', may grow into a new adult individual.

In other species, the postabdomen can elongate and break up into a string of separate buds, which can eventually form a new colony. In some, the pharyngeal part of the animal degenerates, and the abdomen breaks up into patches of germinal tissue, each combining parts of the epidermis, peritoneum, and digestive tract, and capable of growing into new individuals.

In yet others, budding begins shortly after the larva has settled onto the substrate. In the family Didemnidae, for instance, the individual essentially splits into two, with the pharynx growing a new digestive tract and the original digestive tract growing a new pharynx.

=== DNA repair ===
Apurinic/apyrimidinic (AP) sites are a common form of DNA damage that inhibit DNA replication and transcription. AP endonuclease 1 (APEX1), an enzyme produced by C. intestinalis, is employed in the repair of AP sites during early embryonic development. Lack of such repair leads to abnormal development. C. intestinalis also has a set of genes that encode proteins homologous to those employed in the repair of DNA interstrand crosslinks in humans.

== Ecology ==
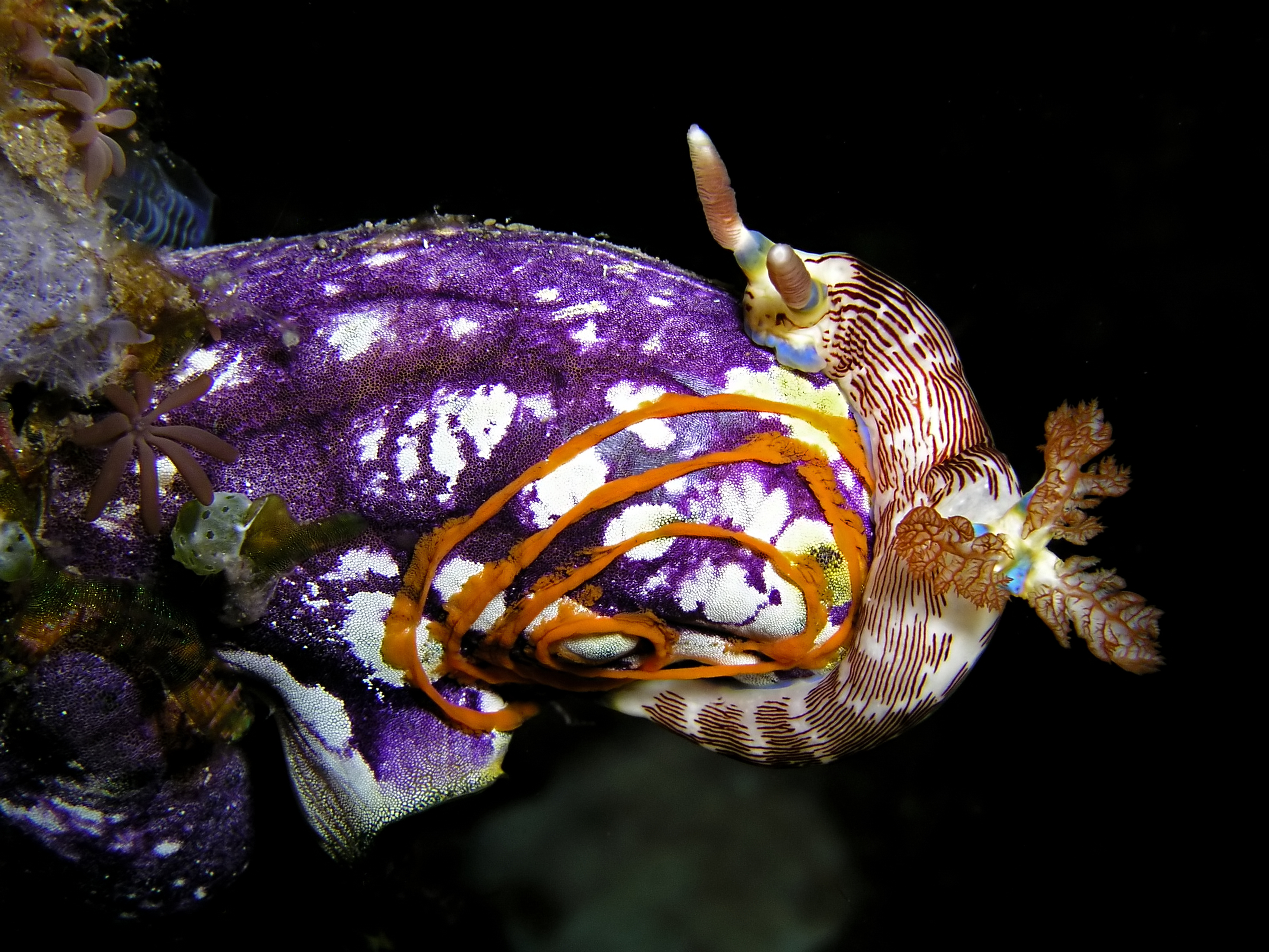
A gold-mouth sea squirt (Polycarpa aurata) being used as a substrate for a nudibranch's (Nembrotha lineolata) egg spiral

The exceptional filtering capability of adult sea squirts causes them to accumulate pollutants that may be toxic to embryos and larvae as well as impede enzyme function in adult tissues. This property has made some species sensitive indicators of pollution.

Over the last few hundred years, most of the world's harbors have been invaded by non-native sea squirts that have been introduced by accident from the shipping industry. Several factors, including quick attainment of sexual maturity, tolerance of a wide range of environments, and a lack of predators, allow sea squirt populations to grow rapidly. Unwanted populations on docks, ship hulls, and farmed shellfish cause significant economic problems, and sea squirt invasions have disrupted the ecosystem of several natural sub-tidal areas by smothering native animal species.

Sea squirts are the natural prey of many animals, including nudibranchs, flatworms, molluscs, rock crabs, sea stars, fish, birds, and sea otters. Some are also eaten by humans in many parts of the world, including Japan, Korea, Chile, and Europe (where they are sold under the name "sea violet"). As chemical defenses, many sea squirts intake and maintain an extremely high concentration of vanadium in the blood, have a very low pH of the tunic due to acid in easily ruptured urinary bladder cells, and (or) produce secondary metabolites harmful to predators and invaders. Some of these metabolites are toxic to cells and are of potential use in pharmaceuticals.

== Evolution ==
=== Fossil record ===
Ascidians are soft-bodied animals, and for this reason, their fossil record is almost entirely lacking. The earliest reliable ascidians is Shankouclava shankouense from the Lower Cambrian Maotianshan Shale (Yunnan, South China). There are also two enigmatic species from the Ediacaran period with some affinity to the ascidians – Ausia (animal) from the Nama Group of Namibia and Burykhia from the Onega Peninsula, White Sea of northern Russia. They are also recorded from Lower Jurassic (Bonet and Benveniste-Velasquez, 1971; Buge and Monniot, 1972) and the Tertiary from France (Deflandre-Riguard, 1949, 1956; Durand, 1952; Deflandre and Deflandre-Rigaud, 1956; Bouche, 1962; Lezaud, 1966; Monniot and Buge, 1971; Varol and Houghton, 1996). Older (Triassic) records are ambiguous. From the Early Jurassic, the species Didemnum cassianum, Quadrifolium hesselboi, Palaeoquadrum ullmanni and other indet genera are recorded. The representatives of the genus Cystodytes (family Polycitoridae) have been described from the Pliocene of France by Monniot (1970, 1971) and Deflandre-Rigaud (1956), and from Eocene of France by Monniot and Buge (1971), and lately from the Late Eocene of S Australia by Łukowiak (2012).

=== Phylogeny ===
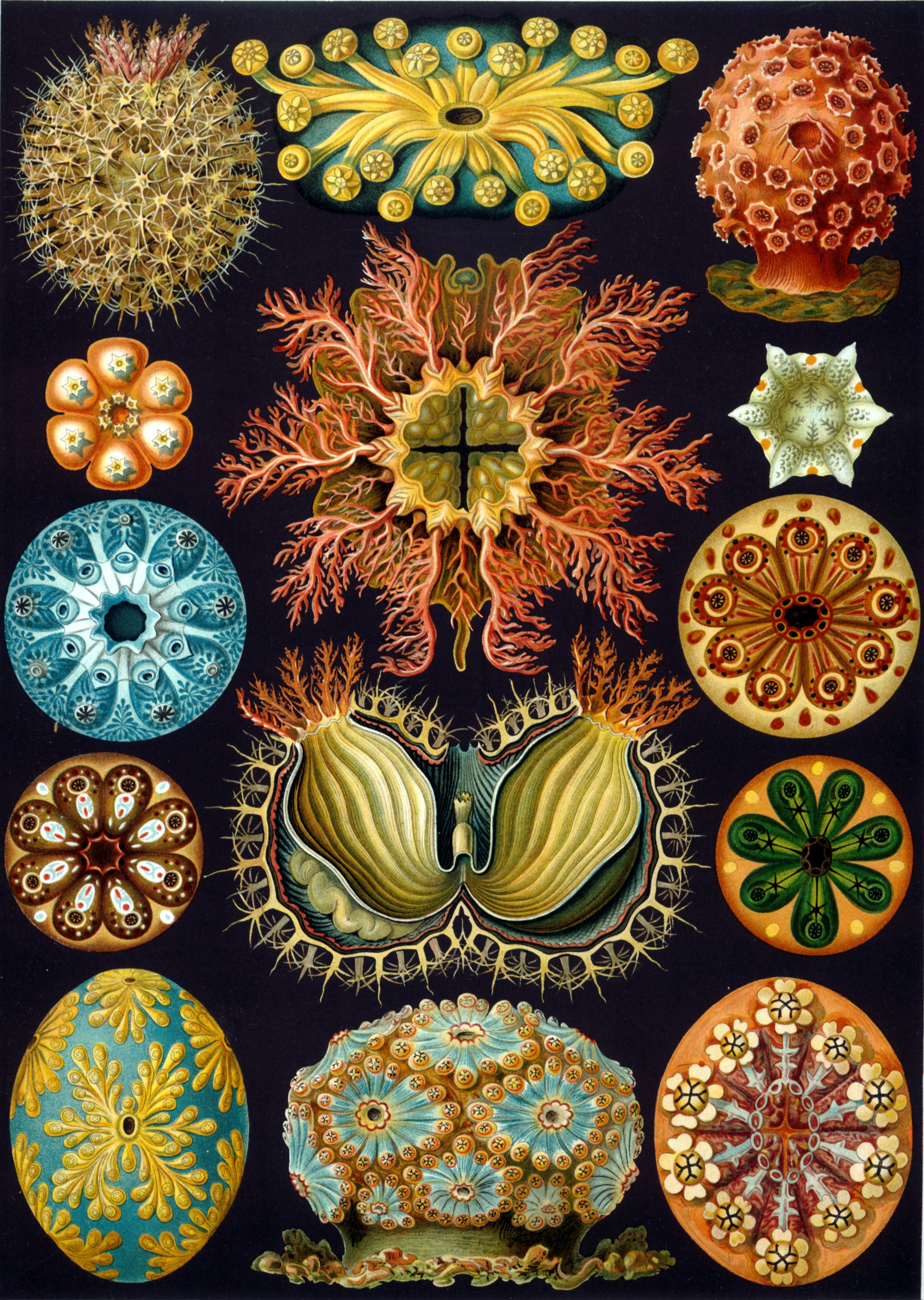
Ernst Haeckel's interpretation of several ascidians from Kunstformen der Natur, 1904

The ascidians were on morphological evidence treated as sister to the Thaliacea and Larvacea, but molecular evidence has suggested that ascidians could be polyphyletic within the Tunicata, as shown in the following cladogram.

- Tunicata
  - Aplousobranchia (ascidians)
  - - Appendicularia
    - - Stolidobranchia (ascidians)
      - - Phlebobranchia (ascidians)
        - Thaliacea

In 2017 and 2018, two studies were published, which suggested an alternate phylogeny, placing Larvacea as sister to the rest of Tunicata, and Thaliacea nested inside Ascidiacea. A grouping of Thaliacea and Ascidiacea to the exclusion of Appendicularia had already been suggested for a long time, under the name of Acopa. Brusca et al. treat Ascidiacea as a monophyletic group including pelagic Thaliacea.

- Tunicata
  - Appendicularia
  - Acopa
    - Stolidobranchia (ascidians)
    - - Thaliacea
      - Enterogona
        - Phlebobranchia (ascidians)
        - Aplousobranchia (ascidians)

== Uses ==
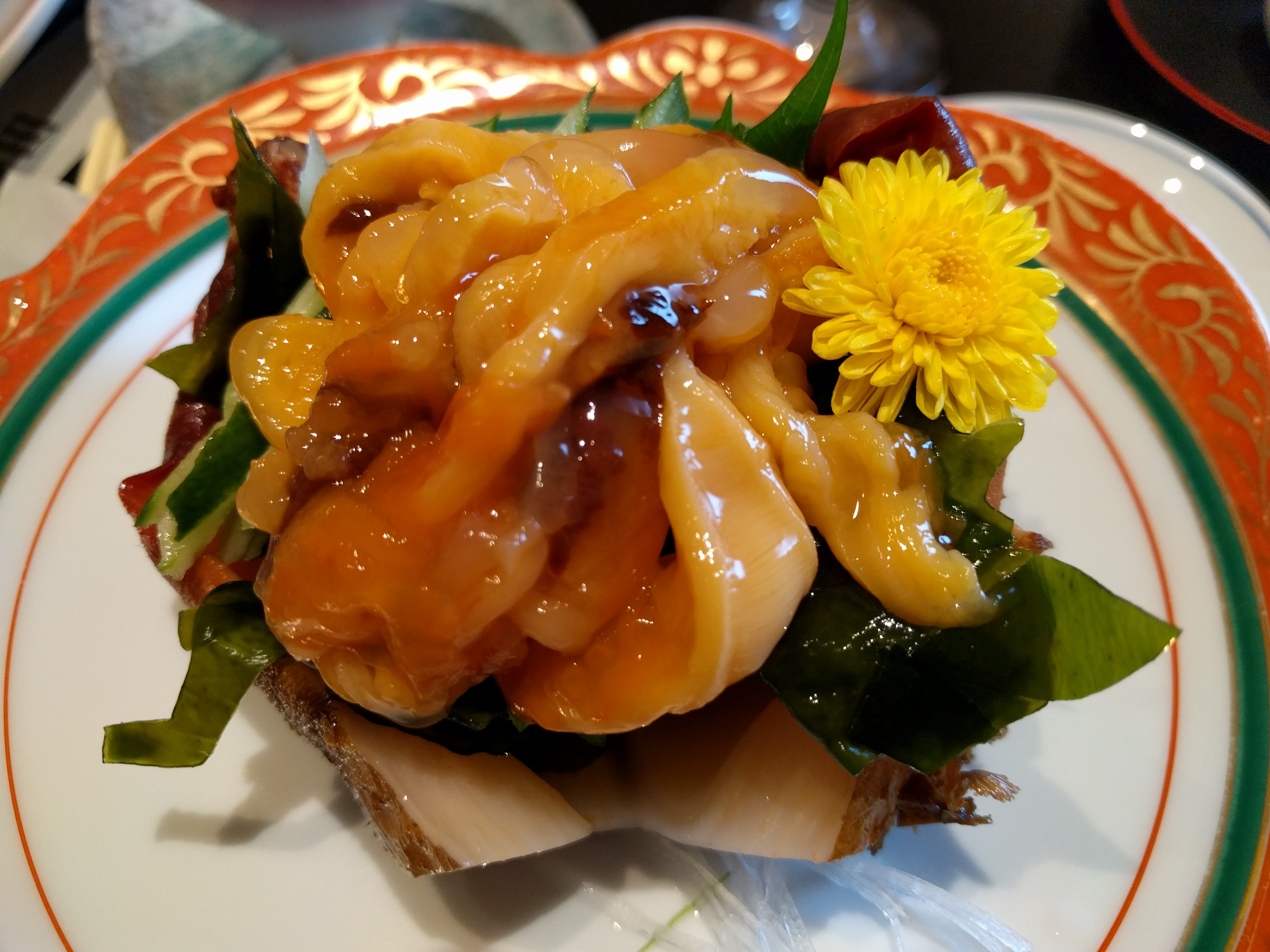
Sea pineapple (hoya) served raw as sashimi.

=== Culinary ===
Various ascidians are eaten by humans around the world as delicacies.

Sea pineapple (Halocynthia roretzi) is cultivated in Japan (hoya, maboya) and Korea (meongge). When served raw, they have a chewy texture and peculiar flavor likened to "rubber dipped in ammonia" which has been attributed to a naturally occurring chemical known as cynthiaol. Sea peach (Halocynthia aurantium) and false sea squirt (Halocynthia hilgendorfi) are also eaten in Korea, where they are known as bidan meongge (silk meongge) and dol meonggae (stone meongge) respectively. Styela clava is farmed in parts of Korea where it is known as mideoduk and is added to various seafood dishes such as agujjim. Tunicate bibimbap is a specialty of Geoje Island, not far from Masan.

Microcosmus species from the Mediterranean Sea are eaten in France (figue de mer, violet), Italy (limone di mare, uova di mare) and Greece (fouska, φούσκα), for example, raw with lemon, or in salads with olive oil, lemon and parsley.

The piure (Pyura chilensis) is used in the cuisine of Chile – it is consumed both raw and in seafood stews similar to bouillabaisse.

Pyura praeputialis is known as cunjevoi in Australia. It was once used as a food source by Australian Aborigines living around Botany Bay, but is now used mainly for fishing bait.

Ciona is being developed in Norway as a potential substitute meat protein, after processing to remove its 'marine taste' and to make its texture less 'squid-like'.

=== Model organisms for research ===
Several factors make sea squirts good models for studying the fundamental developmental processes of chordates, such as cell-fate specification. The embryonic development of sea squirts is simple, rapid, and easily manipulated. Because each embryo contains relatively few cells, complex processes can be studied at the cellular level, while remaining in the context of the whole embryo. The eggs of some species contain little yolk and are therefore transparent making them ideal for fluorescent imaging. Its maternally-derived proteins are naturally associated with pigment (in a few species only), so cell lineages are easily labeled, allowing scientists to visualize embryogenesis from beginning to end.

Sea squirts are also valuable because of their unique evolutionary position: as an approximation of ancestral chordates, they can provide insight into the link between chordates and ancestral non-chordate deuterostomes, as well as the evolution of vertebrates from simple chordates. The sequenced genomes of the related sea squirts Ciona intestinalis and Ciona savignyi are small and easily manipulated; comparisons with the genomes of other organisms such as flies, nematodes, pufferfish and mammals provides valuable information regarding chordate evolution. A collection of over 480,000 cDNAs have been sequenced and are available to support further analysis of gene expression, which is expected to provide information about complex developmental processes and regulation of genes in vertebrates. Gene expression in embryos of sea squirts can be conveniently inhibited using Morpholino oligos.
