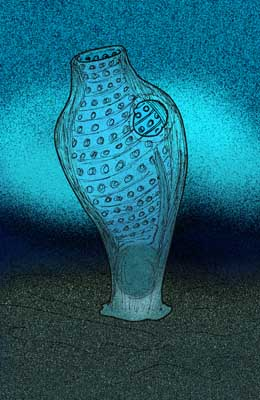
- Reconstruction as a tunicate-like organism

Scientific classification
- Kingdom: Animalia
- Phylum: Chordata
- Subphylum: Tunicata
- Class: Ascidiacea (?)
- Family: †Ausiidae
- Genus: †Burykhia; Fedonkin, Vickers-Rich, Swalla, Trusler & Hall, 2012
- Species: †B. hunti

Binomial name
- †Burykhia hunti Fedonkin, Vickers-Rich, Swalla, Trusler & Hall, 2012

= Burykhia =

Burykhia Temporal range: Ediacaran, 555 Ma

Extinct genus of animals

Burykhia hunti is an Ediacaran fossil from the White Sea region of Russia dating to 555 million years ago. It is considered of possibly ascidian affinity, due to the sac-like morphology and a series of distinctly perforated bands reminiscent of a tunicate pharynx. If B. hunti is a tunicate, it could be the oldest ascidian fossil known as of its publication in 2012. It is also possibly related to the slightly younger Ausia, another putative ascidian from the Vendian biota in Namibia.

== Discovery and Naming ==
The fossil material of Burkyhia was found in the Syuz'ma River, in the middle part of the Verkhovka Formation (the Ust' Pinega Formation according to A.F. Stankovskiy's stratigraphic scheme) in Arkhangelsk Oblast, Northwestern Russia, during 1995 and 2003 field seasons; the formation's age is constrained by two volcanic ash dates of 557.28 ± 0.6 and 552.96 ± 0.7 million years.

The generic name Burykhia derives from the Latinised surnames of Andreevna and Timofey Antonovich Burykh, residents who lived near the fossil site that helped with the expedition. The specific name hunti derives from the surname of Nathan Hunt, who has contributed to the study of Neoproterozoic rocks in Russia.

== Description ==
Burykhia hunti is possibly the earliest, and oldest, known ascidian tunicate, alongside Ausia from the younger Nama Group.

It has a sac-like form, which grew up to 135 mm (5.3 in) in height, and a width of 97 mm (3.8 in). The body itself is made up of bands, which contain evenly spaced openings, which are also equal in size. There is also a longitudinal zig-zag ridge running down the length of the body, supporting a possible affinity with the suborder Phlebobranchia, and was most likely sessile. The fossil material of Burykhia also clearly shows that it was highly elastic, due to the deformation of the bands and fossils themselves. It has also been noted that in all material, there is preserved a spherical feature within or adjacent to Burykhia, which could be infilled internal structures, such as a digestive tract.

It has been noted to share many similarities with Ausia, although it is much better preserved, and has a few key details which differentiate it as its own genus. Even when taking deformational processes into account, openings of Burykhia are set further apart than the openings seen in Ausia, and are not as elongated. The longitudinal ridge seen in Burykhia is also a lot more distinct than in Ausia. Although it has been noted that if better examples of Ausia or Burykhia are found that show both are the same, there is a chance Burykhia could be synonymized with Ausia, but until then, they remain as separate genera.

== Affinities ==
Due to the preservation of Burykhia, thanks to the possible rapid infilling of its internals from sand, something common to the area Burykhia was found, it was possible to do an in depth look at to what Burykhia may have affinities to, unlike the possibly related Ausia, which has been though many reinterpretations.

It has already been noted that the longitudinal ridge that runs down the length of Burykhia suggest affinities with the Phlebobranchia, a suborder with in class Ascidiacea, which itself sits within the subphylum of Tunicata. The arrangement of the openings is also similar to that of the gill sacs seem in adult tunicates. However, the banding that runs around Burykhia joins the longitudinal ridge with a noticeable glide reflection, similar to other Ediacaran forms like the Proarticulata or Petalonamae, although the paper also notes that it is known that some chordate relatives do show glide reflection during developmental stages, like hemichordates, which show a glide reflection in their gill apparatus during growth. Burkhia also has a similar size range to most tunicates.

If Burykhia is indeed a tunicate, alongside Ausia, both would also lend credence and help calibrate the debated molecular clock estimates of chordates, with one molecular clock study estimating that protochordates separated some 900 million years ago, although some have disputed this, putting the time-interval of separation at 794 million years ago.

== See also ==
- List of Ediacaran genera
