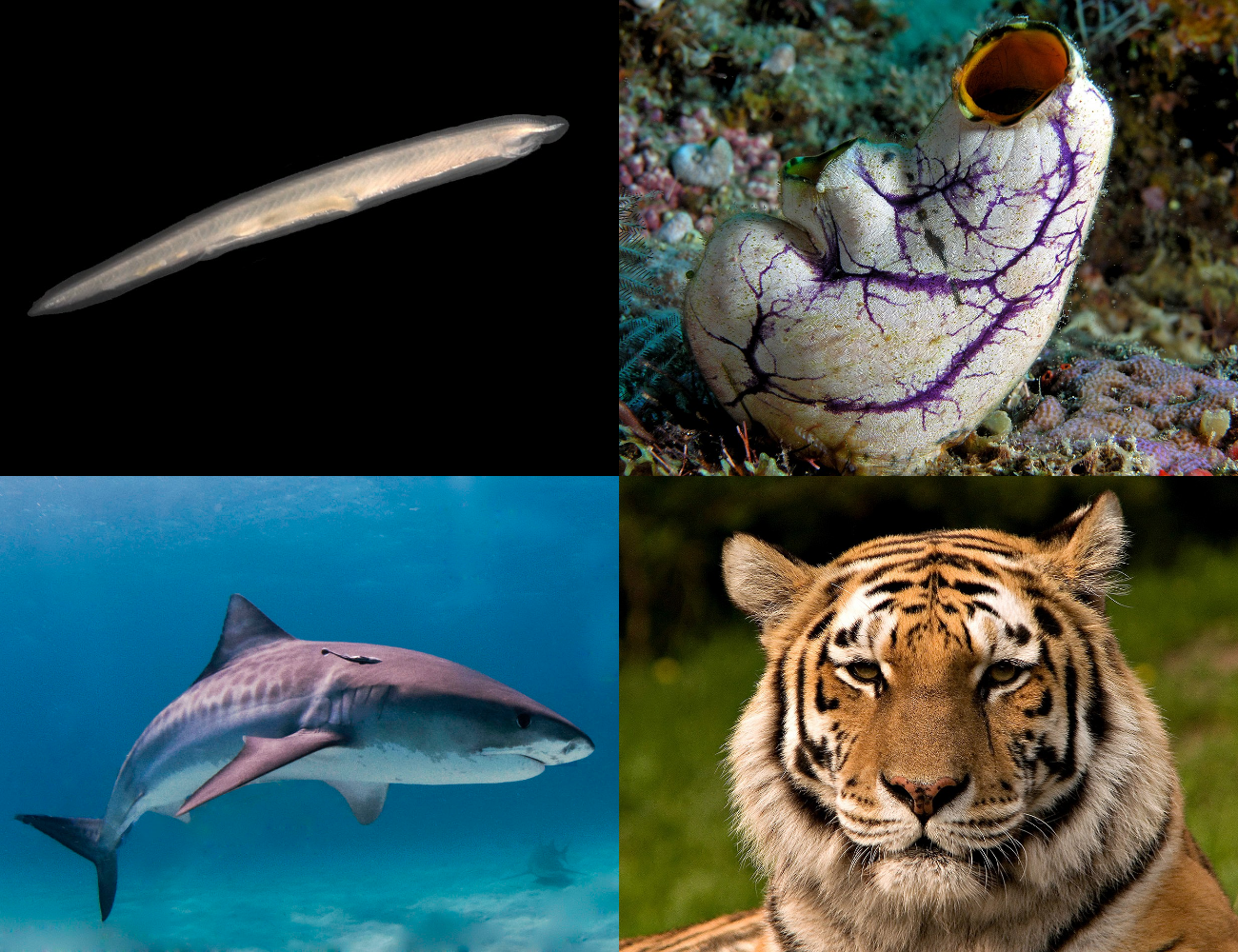
- Clockwise: lancelet, tunicate, tiger, shark

Scientific classification
- Kingdom: Animalia
- Subkingdom: Eumetazoa
- Clade: ParaHoxozoa
- Clade: Bilateria
- Clade: Nephrozoa
- Superphylum: Deuterostomia
- Phylum: Chordata; Haeckel, 1874

Subgroups
- Cephalochordata; Olfactores; Tunicata; Appendicularia; Acopa; †Megasiphon; †Shankouclava; Total group Vertebrata; †Emmonsaspis; †Metaspriggina; †Nuucichthys; †Myllokunmingiidae; †Conodonta?; Vertebrata sensu stricto; †Cathaymyrus; †Pikaia; †Vetulocystidae?; †Vetulicolia? (paraphyletic?); And see text

= Chordate =

Chordates Temporal range: Cambrian–Present525–0 Ma

Phylum of animals having a dorsal nerve cord

A chordate (/ˈkɔːrdeɪt/ KOR-dayt) is a bilaterian animal belonging to the phylum Chordata (/kɔːrˈdeɪtə/ kor-DAY-tə). All chordates possess, at some point during their larval or adult stages, five distinctive physical characteristics (synapomorphies) that distinguish them from other taxa: a notochord, a hollow dorsal nerve cord, an endostyle or thyroid, pharyngeal slits, and a post-anal tail.

In addition to the morphological characteristics used to define chordates, analysis of genome sequences has identified two conserved signature indels (CSIs) in their proteins: cyclophilin-like protein and inner mitochondrial membrane protease ATP23, which are exclusively shared by all vertebrates, tunicates, and cephalochordates. These CSIs provide molecular means to reliably distinguish chordates from all other animals.

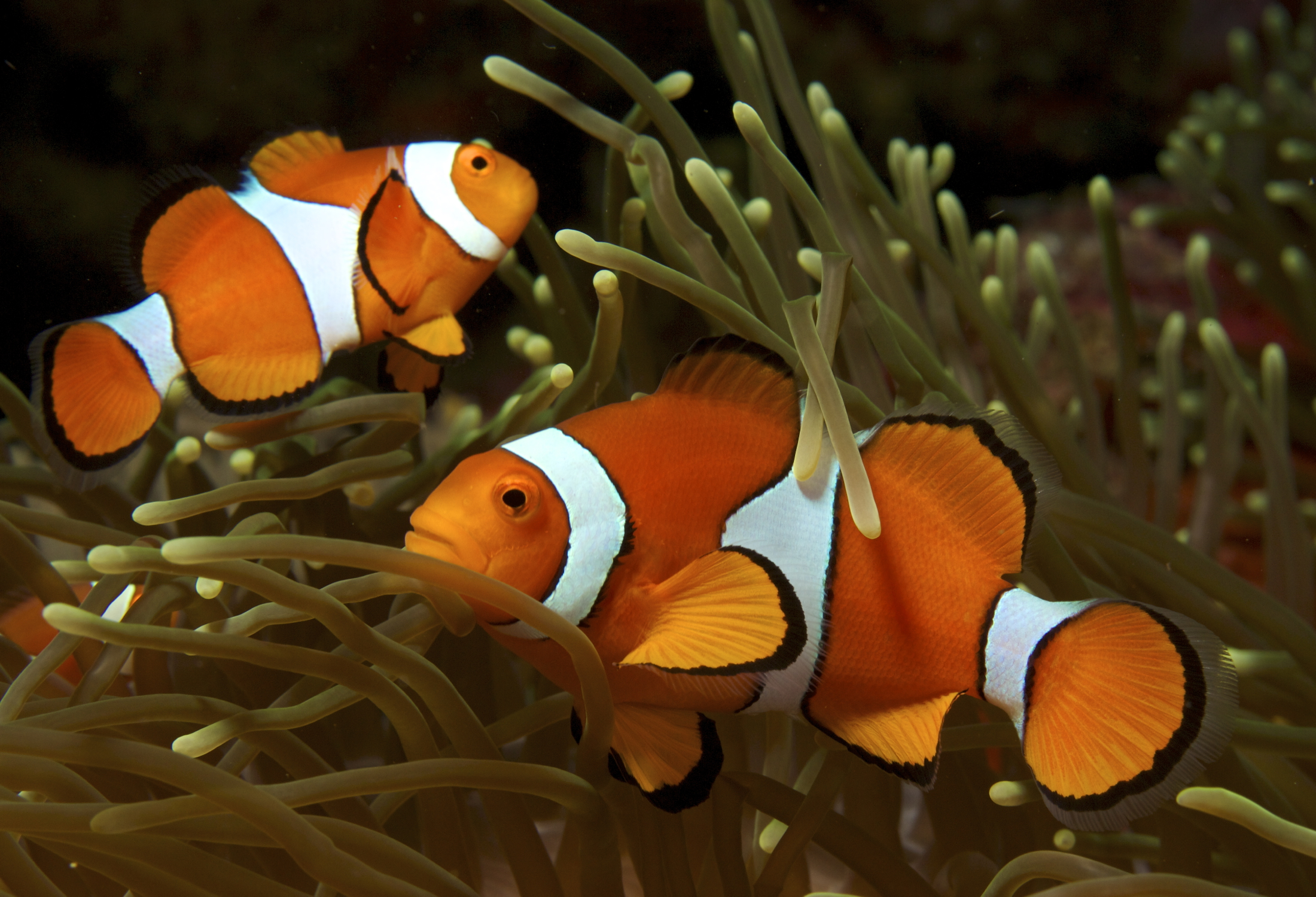
Clownfishes are an example of a Chordate

Chordates are divided into three subphyla: Vertebrata (fish, amphibians, reptiles, birds and mammals), which possess a skull and whose notochords are replaced by a cartilaginous/bony axial endoskeleton (spine); Tunicata or Urochordata (sea squirts, salps, and larvaceans), which only retain the synapomorphies during their larval stage; and Cephalochordata (lancelets), which resemble jawless fish but have no gills or a distinct head. The vertebrates and tunicates compose the clade Olfactores (see diagram under Phylogeny), which is characterized by the presence of an advanced olfactory system and is sister to Cephalochordata. Extinct taxa such as the conodonts are chordates, but their internal placement is less certain. Hemichordata (which includes the acorn worms) was previously considered a fourth chordate subphylum but now is treated as a separate phylum, which is now thought to be closer to the echinoderms, and together they form the clade Ambulacraria. The sister phylum of the chordates, Ambulacraria, and possibly Xenacoelomorpha are believed to form the superphylum Deuterostomia, although this is called into doubt in a 2021 publication.

Chordata is the third-largest phylum of the animal kingdom (behind only the protostomal phyla Arthropoda and Mollusca) and is also one of the most ancient animal taxa. Chordate fossils have been found from as early as the Cambrian explosion, over 539 million years ago. Of the more than 81,000 living species of chordates, about half are ray-finned fishes (class Actinopterygii) and the vast majority of the rest are tetrapods, a terrestrial clade of lobe-finned fishes (Sarcopterygii) that evolved air-breathing using lungs.

== Etymology ==
The name "chordate" comes from the first of these synapomorphies, the notochord, which plays a significant role in chordate body plan structuring and movements. Chordates are bilaterally symmetric, possess a coelom and a closed circulatory system, and exhibit metameric segmentation. Although the name Chordata is attributed to William Bateson (1885), it was already in prevalent use by 1880. Ernst Haeckel described a taxon comprising tunicates, cephalochordates, and vertebrates in 1866. Though he used the German vernacular form, it is allowed under the ICZN Code because of its subsequent Latinization.

== Anatomy ==
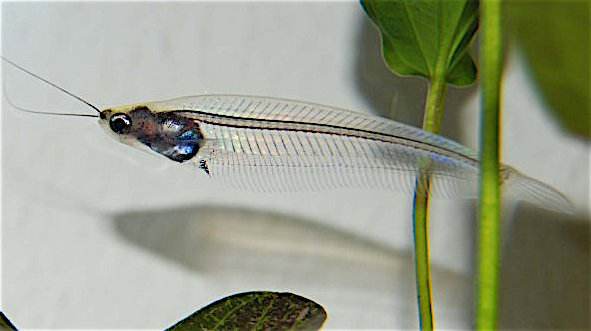
The glass catfish (Kryptopterus vitreolus) is one of the few chordates with a visible backbone. The spinal cord is housed within its backbone.

Chordates form a phylum of animals that are defined by having, at some stage in their lives, all the following anatomical features:

- A notochord, a stiff but elastic rod of glycoprotein wrapped in two collagen helices, which extends along the central axis of the body. Among members of the subphylum Vertebrata (vertebrates), the notochord gets replaced by hyaline cartilage and/or osseous tissue of the spine, and notochord remnants develop into the intervertebral discs, which allow adjacent spinal vertebrae to bend and twist relative to each other. In wholly aquatic species, the notochord helps the animal swim more efficiently when flexing its tail side-to-side by storing elastic energy like a cantilever spring.
- A hollow dorsal nerve cord, also known as the neural tube, which develops into the spinal cord, the main communication trunk of the nervous system. In vertebrates, the rostral end of the neural tube enlarges into several vesicles during embryonic development, which give rise to the brain.
- Pharyngeal slits. The pharynx is the part of the throat immediately behind the mouth. In fish, the slits are modified to form gills, but in some other chordates they are part of a filter-feeding system that extracts food particles from ingested water. In tetrapods, they are only present during embryonic stages of development.
- A post-anal tail. A muscular tail that extends backwards beyond the location of the anus. In some chordates, such as hominids, this is only present in the embryonic stage.
- An endostyle. This is a groove in the ventral wall of the pharynx. In filter-feeding species, it produces mucus to gather food particles, which helps in transporting food to the esophagus. It also stores iodine, and may be a precursor of the vertebrate thyroid gland.

There are soft constraints that separate chordates from other biological lineages, but are not part of the formal definition:

- All chordates are deuterostomes. This means, during embryonic development, the anus forms before the mouth does.
- All chordates are based on a bilateral body plan.
- All chordates are coelomates and have a fluid-filled body cavity (coelom) with a complete serosal lining derived from mesoderm called mesothelium (see Brusca and Brusca).
Anatomy of the cephalochordate Branchiostoma lanceolatum. Bolded items are components of all chordates at some point in their lifetimes and distinguish them from other phyla.

== Classification ==
The following schema is from the 2015 edition of Vertebrate Palaeontology. The invertebrate chordate classes are from Fishes of the World. While it is generally structured so as to reflect evolutionary relationships (similar to a cladogram), it also retains the traditional ranks used in Linnaean taxonomy.

- Phylum Chordata
  - Subphylum Cephalochordata (Acraniata) – (lancelets; 32 species)
    - Class Leptocardii (lancelets)
  - Subphylum Tunicata (Urochordata) – (tunicates; 3,000 species)
    - Class "Ascidiacea" (sea squirts; paraphyletic as thaliaceans are excluded)
    - Class Thaliacea (salps, doliolids and pyrosomes)
    - Class Appendicularia (larvaceans)
  - Subphylum Vertebrata (Craniata) (vertebrates – animals with backbones; 66,100+ species)
    - Infraphylum "Agnatha" paraphyletic (jawless vertebrates; 100+ species)
      - Superclass Cyclostomata
        - Class Myxinoidea or Myxini (hagfish; 85 species)
        - Class Petromyzontida or Hyperoartia (lampreys; 53 species)
      - Class †Conodonta
      - Class †Myllokunmingiida
      - Class †Pteraspidomorphi
      - Class †Thelodonti
      - Class †Anaspida
      - Class †Cephalaspidomorphi
    - Infraphylum Gnathostomata (jawed vertebrates)
      - Class †"Placodermi" (Paleozoic armoured forms; paraphyletic in relation to all other gnathostomes)
      - Class Chondrichthyes (cartilaginous fish; 900+ species)
      - Class †"Acanthodii" (Paleozoic "spiny sharks"; paraphyletic in relation to Chondrichthyes)
      - Class "Osteichthyes" (bony fish; 30,000+ species; paraphyletic when tetrapods are excluded)
        - Subclass Actinopterygii (ray-finned fish; about 30,000 species)
        - Clade "Sarcopterygii" (35,100+ species; paraphyletic when tetrapods are excluded – 8 species of lobe-finned fish)
          - Class Actinistia (2 species)
          - Class Dipnoi (6 species)
          - Superclass Tetrapoda (four-limbed vertebrates; 35,100+ species) (Note: The classification below follows Benton 2004, and uses a synthesis of rank-based Linnaean taxonomy and also reflects evolutionary relationships. Benton included the superclass Tetrapoda in the subclass Sarcopterygii in order to reflect the direct descent of tetrapods from lobe-finned fish, despite the former being assigned a higher taxonomic rank)
          - Class Amphibia (amphibians; 8,100+ species)
          - Class Sauropsida (reptiles (including birds); 21,300+ species – 10,000+ species of birds and 11,300+ species of reptiles)
          - Class Synapsida (mammals; 5,700+ species)
  - Genus †Cathaymyrus
  - Genus †Pikaia

== Subphyla ==
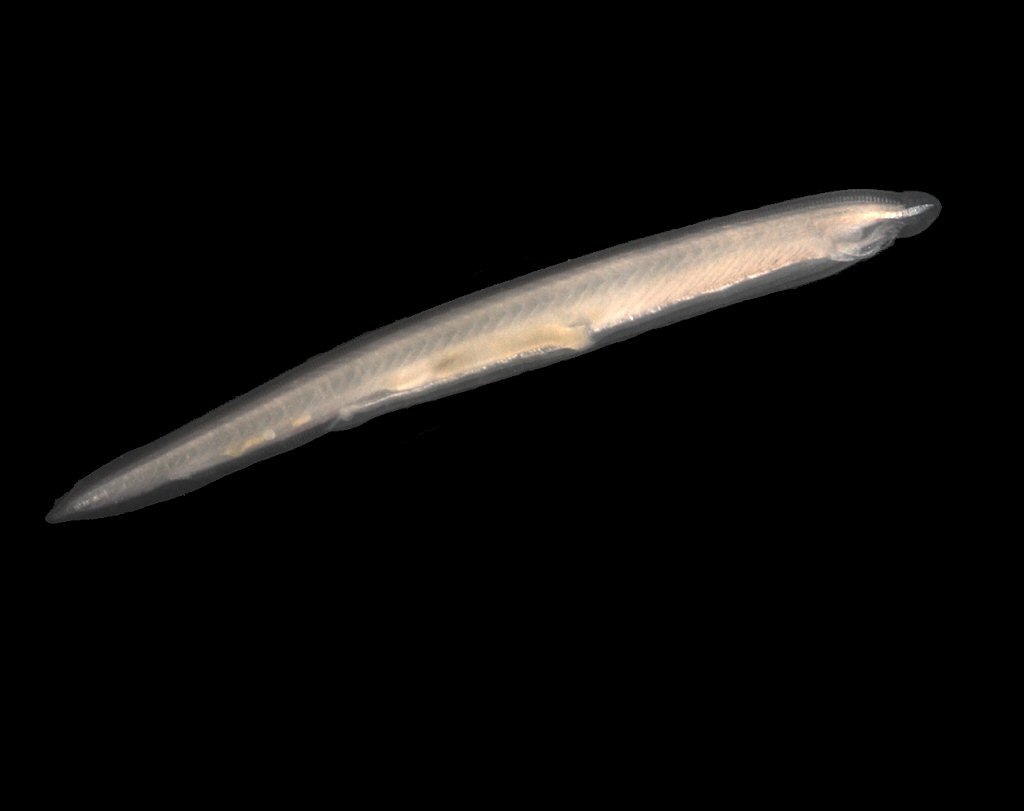
Cephalochordate: lancelet. Pictured species: Branchiostoma lanceolatum.

=== Lancelets (Cephalochordata) ===
The cephalochordates are small, "vaguely fish-shaped" animals that lack brains and clearly defined heads, as well as lacking specialized sensory organs. These burrowing filter-feeders compose the earliest-branching chordate subphylum.

=== Tunicates (Urochordata) ===
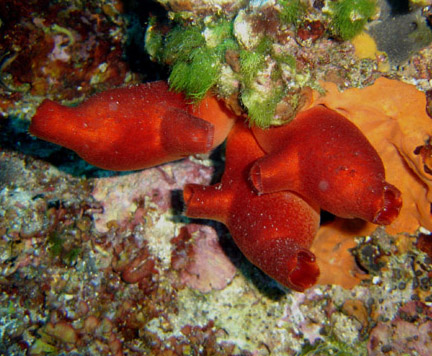
Sea squirts are an example of a tunicate

The tunicates have three distinct adult shapes. Each is a member of one of three monophyletic clades. All tunicate larvae have the standard chordate features, including long, tadpole-like tails. Their larvae also have rudimentary brains, light sensors, and tilt sensors.

The smallest of the three groups of tunicates is the Appendicularia. They retain tadpole-like shapes and active swimming all their lives and were for a long time regarded as larvae of the other two groups.

The other two groups, the sea squirts and the salps, lose the notochord, the nerve cord, and the post-anal tail as they metamorphose into adult forms. Both are soft-bodied filter feeders with multiple gill slits and feed on plankton.

Sea squirts are sessile organisms and consist mainly of water pumps and filter-feeding apparatus. Most attach firmly to the sea floor, where they remain in one place for life.

The salps float in mid-water and have a two-generation cycle in which one generation is solitary and the next forms chain-like colonies.

The etymology of the term Urochordata (Balfour 1881) is from the ancient Greek οὐρά (oura, "tail") + Latin chorda ("cord"), because the notochord is only found in the tail. The term Tunicata (Lamarck 1816) is recognised as having precedence and is now more commonly used.

Comparison of two invertebrate chordates

A. Lancelet, B. Larval tunicate, C. Adult tunicate
--------------------------------------------------------
1. Notochord, 2. Nerve chord, 3. Buccal cirri, 4. Pharynx, 5. Gill slit, 6. Gonad, 7. Gut, 8. V-shaped muscles, 9. Anus, 10. Inhalant syphon, 11. Oral/Inhalant siphon, 12. Exhalant siphon, 13. Heart, 14. Stomach, 15. Esophagus, 16. Intestines, 17. Atrium, 21. Tunic.

=== Vertebrates (Craniata) ===
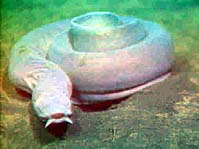
Hagfish, an unusual vertebrate that lacks a vertebral column.

All craniate species have a distinct skull. However, not all of them possess vertebrae. The notochord is accompanied or replaced by the vertebral column in most craniates. It consists of a series of cylindrical, bony or cartilaginous vertebrae and projections that link the vertebrae. These generally have neural arches that protect the spinal cord.

Hagfish have incomplete braincases and lack vertebrae. Thus, they were regarded as non-vertebrate craniates. However, the cladistic exclusion of hagfish from the vertebrates is controversial, as they may have secondarily lost their vertebral columns, making them vertebrates.

Molecular phylogenetics, which uses DNA sequences to classify organisms, has generally supported the grouping of hagfish and lampreys (which have vertebrae) in a clade named Cyclostomata, suggesting that the hagfish are indeed vertebrates. Examination of fossil hagfish also supports this conclusion. Indicating that Vertebrata is the same group as Craniata, instead of the former being a subset of the latter.

== Phylogeny ==
=== Overview ===
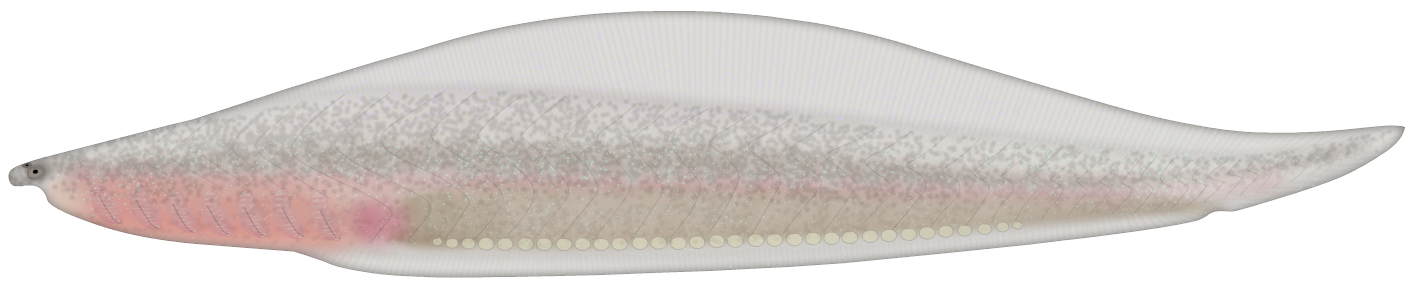
Haikouichthys ercaicunensis, from around 518 million years ago in China, may be the earliest known fish.

There is still much ongoing differential (DNA sequence-based) comparison research that is trying to separate out the simplest forms of chordates. As some lineages that lack a backbone or notochord might have lost these structures over time, this complicates the classification of chordates. Some chordate lineages may only be identified by DNA analysis, as there is no physical trace of any chordate-like structures.

Attempts to work out the evolutionary relationships of the chordates have produced several hypotheses. The current consensus is that chordates are monophyletic (meaning, all chordates are descend from a single, common ancestor, which can be considered a chordate) and that the vertebrates' nearest relatives are tunicates. In 2016, identification of two conserved signature indels (CSIs) in the proteins cyclophilin-like protein and mitochondrial inner membrane protease ATP23, which are exclusively shared by all vertebrates, tunicates, and cephalochordates, also provided strong evidence of the monophyly of Chordata.

All the earliest chordate fossils have been found in the Early Cambrian Chengjiang fauna, and include three species that are regarded as fish, and hence vertebrates. Because the fossil record of early chordates is poor, only molecular phylogenetics offers a reasonable prospect of dating their emergence. However, the use of molecular phylogenetics for dating evolutionary transitions is controversial. It has proven difficult to produce a detailed classification within the living chordates. Attempts to produce evolutionary "family trees" show that many of the traditional classes are paraphyletic.

- Deuterostomes
  - - Ambulacrarians
      - Hemichordates
      - Echinoderms
    - Chordates
      - Cephalochordates
      - Olfactores
        - Tunicates
        - Vertebrates

Diagram of the evolutionary relationships of chordates.

While this has been well known since the 19th century, an insistence on only monophyletic taxa has resulted in vertebrate classification being in a state of flux.

Most animals more complex than jellyfish and other cnidarians are split into two groups, the protostomes and deuterostomes, the latter of which contains chordates. It seems very likely the 555 million-year-old Kimberella was a member of the protostomes. If so, this means the protostome and deuterostome lineages must have split some time before Kimberella appeared—at least 558 million years ago, and hence well before the start of the Cambrian 538.8 million years ago. Three enigmatic species that are possible very early tunicates, and therefore deuterostomes, were also found from the Ediacaran period – Ausia fenestrata from the Nama Group of Namibia, the sac-like Yarnemia ascidiformis, and one from a second new Ausia-like genus from the Onega Peninsula of northern Russia, Burykhia hunti. Results of a new study have shown possible affinity of these Ediacaran organisms to the ascidians. Ausia and Burykhia lived in shallow coastal waters slightly more than 555 to 548 million years ago and are believed to be the oldest evidence of the chordate lineage of metazoans. The Russian Precambrian fossil Yarnemia is identified as a tunicate only tentatively, because its fossils are nowhere near as well-preserved as those of Ausia and Burykhia, so this identification has been questioned.

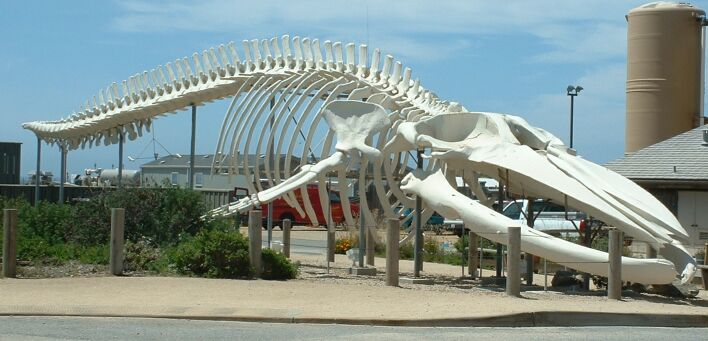
A skeleton of the blue whale, the largest animal, extant or extinct, ever discovered. Mounted outside the Long Marine Laboratory at the University of California, Santa Cruz. The largest blue whale ever reliably recorded measured 98ft (30m) long.

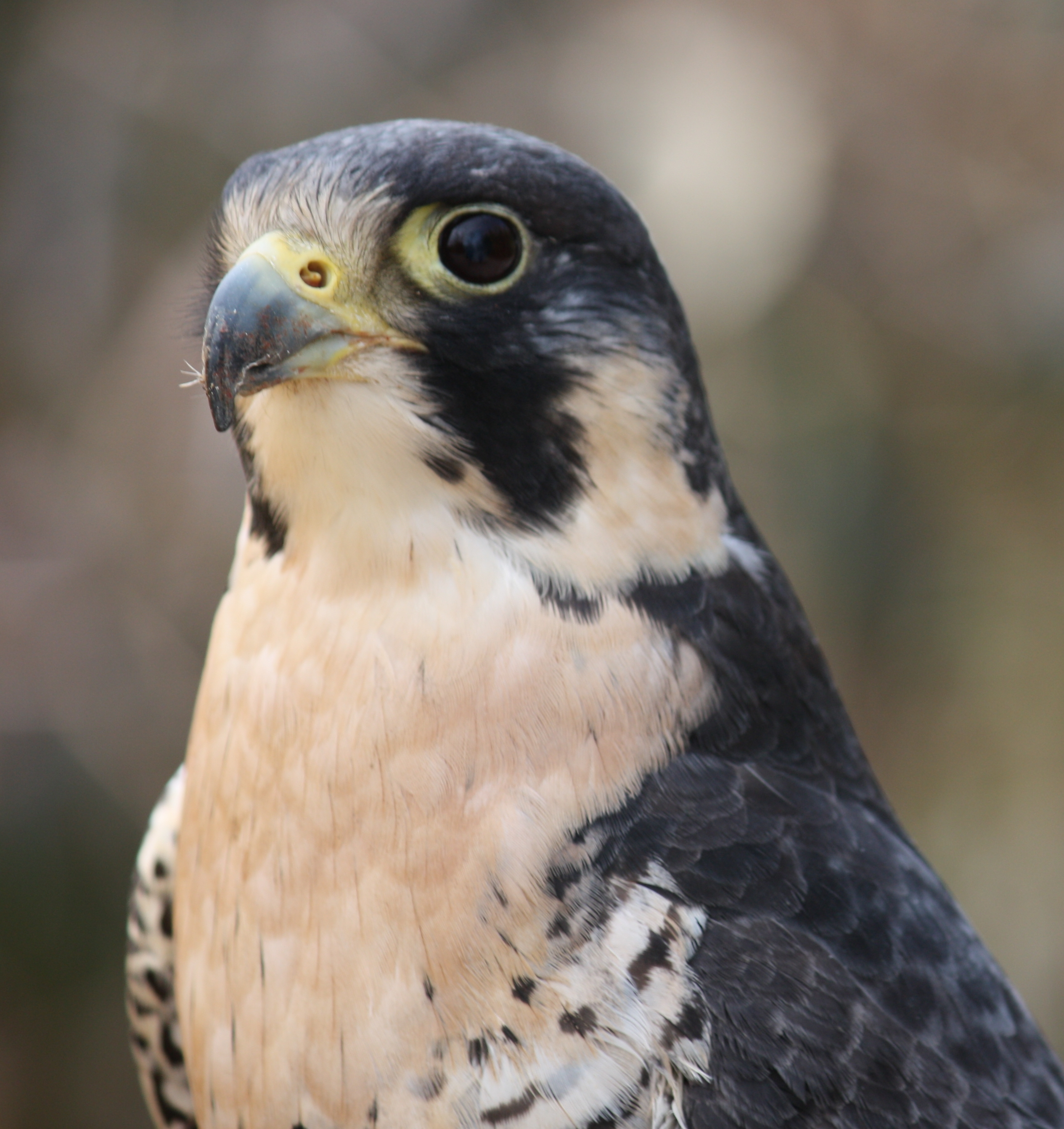
A peregrine falcon, the world's fastest animal. Peregrines use gravity and aerodynamics to achieve their top speed of around 390 km/h (242 mph), as opposed to locomotion.

Fossils of one major deuterostome group, the echinoderms (whose modern members include starfish, sea urchins and crinoids), are quite common from the start of the Cambrian, 542 million years ago. The Mid Cambrian fossil Rhabdotubus johanssoni has been interpreted as a pterobranch hemichordate. Opinions differ about whether the Chengjiang fauna fossil Yunnanozoon, from the earlier Cambrian, was a hemichordate or chordate. Another fossil, Haikouella lanceolata, also from the Chengjiang fauna, is interpreted as a chordate and possibly a craniate, as it shows signs of a heart, arteries, gill filaments, a tail, a neural chord with a brain at the front end, and possibly eyes—although it also had short tentacles around its mouth. Haikouichthys and Myllokunmingia, also from the Chengjiang fauna, are regarded as fish. Pikaia, discovered much earlier (1911) but from the Mid Cambrian Burgess Shale (505 Mya), is also regarded as a primitive chordate. On the other hand, fossils of early chordates are very rare, since invertebrate chordates have no bones or teeth, and only one has been reported for the rest of the Cambrian. The best known and earliest unequivocally identified Tunicate is Shankouclava shankouense from the Lower Cambrian Maotianshan Shale at Shankou village, Anning, near Kunming (South China).

The evolutionary relationships between the chordate groups and between chordates as a whole and their closest deuterostome relatives have been debated since 1890. Studies based on anatomical, embryological, and paleontological data have produced different "family trees". Some have closely linked chordates and hemichordates, but that idea is now rejected. Combining such analyses with data from a small set of ribosomal RNA genes eliminated some older ideas, but opened up the possibility that tunicates (urochordates) are "basal deuterostomes", surviving members of the group from which echinoderms, hemichordates and chordates evolved. Some researchers believe that, within the chordates, craniates are most closely related to cephalochordates, but there are also reasons for regarding tunicates (urochordates) as craniates' closest relatives.

Since early chordates have left a poor fossil record, attempts have been made to calculate the key dates in their evolution by molecular phylogenetics techniques—by analyzing biochemical differences, mainly in RNA. One such study suggested that deuterostomes arose before 900 million years ago and the earliest chordates around 896 million years ago. However, molecular estimates of dates often disagree with each other and with the fossil record, and their assumption that the molecular clock runs at a known constant rate has been challenged.

Traditionally, Cephalochordata and Craniata were grouped into the proposed clade "Euchordata", which would have been the sister group to Tunicata/Urochordata. More recently, Cephalochordata has been thought of as a sister group to the "Olfactores", which includes the craniates and tunicates. Studies since 2006 analyzing large sequencing datasets strongly support Olfactores as a clade.

A specific relationship between vertebrates and tunicates is also strongly supported by two CSIs found in the proteins predicted exosome complex RRP44 and serine palmitoyltransferase, that are exclusively shared by species from these two subphyla but not cephalochordates, indicating vertebrates are more closely related to tunicates than cephalochordates.

=== Cladogram ===
Below is a phylogenetic tree of the phylum. Lines of the cladogram show evolutionary relationships between the major groups of extinct taxa, which are denoted with a dagger (†), and extant taxa. (Note: Adapted from various studies: lancelet and tunicate phylogeny adapted from Delsuc and colleagues, Jawless fish phylogeny adapted from Miyashita and colleagues and Noriyuki Satoh, Placoderm and acanthodian phylogeny adapted from Brazeau and Friedman, Chondrichthyes phylogeny adapted from Amaral and colleagues, and Osteichthyes phylogeny adapted from Betancur and colleagues (non-tetrapods) and Pardo and colleagues (tetrapods).)

- Chordata
  - Cephalochordata (lancelets)
  - Olfactores
    - Tunicata
    - Vertebrata
      - Myllokunmingiida †
      - - - Anaspidomorphi †
          - - Conodonta †
            - Cyclostomi
              - Myxini (hagfish)
              - Hyperoartia (lampreys)
        - - Pteraspidomorphi †
          - - Thelodonti †
            - - Galeaspida †
              - - Pituriaspida †
                - - Osteostraci †
                  - Gnathostomata
                    - "Placodermi" † (paraphyletic)
                    - - - "Acanthodii" † (paraphyletic)
                        - Chondrichthyes
                          - Holocephali
                          - Elasmobranchii
                            - Selachii (sharks)
                            - Batoidea (rays)
                      - Osteichthyes
                        - Actinopterygii
                          - Cladistia
                          - Actinopteri
                            - Chondrostei
                            - Neopterygii
                              - Holostei
                              - Teleostei
                        - Sarcopterygii
                          - Actinistia (coelacanths)
                          - Rhipidistia
                            - Dipnoi (lungfish)
                            - Tetrapoda
                              - Amphibia
                              - Amniota
                                - Sauropsida
                                - Synapsida

Relationships of stem and early crown chordates after Mussini et al., 2024:

- Chordata (total group)
  - Banffia†
  - Heteromorphus†
  - - Skeemella†
    - - Nesonektris†
      - - Vetulicolidae†
        - - Didazoon†
          - Pomatrum†
          - Yuyuanozoon†
          - - Yunnanozoon†
            - - Cathaymyrus†
              - Pikaia†
              - Chordata (crown group)
                - Cephalochordata
                - - Tunicata
                  - - Metaspriggina†
                    - - Myllokunmingia†
                      - Vertebrata

== Closest non-chordate relatives ==
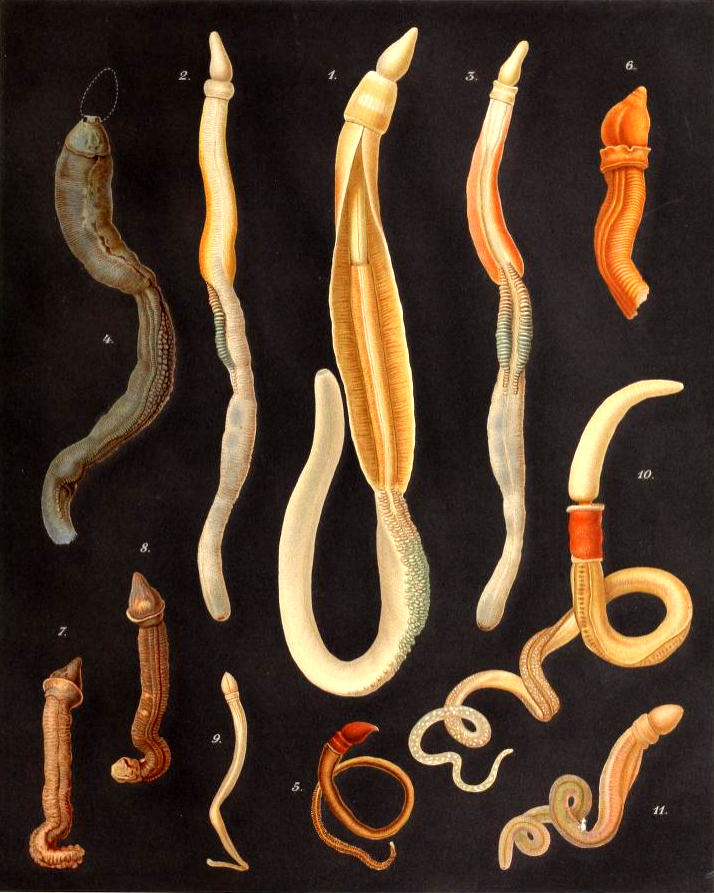
Acorn worms, or Enteropneusts, are an example of hemichordates.

The closest relatives of the chordates are believed to be the hemichordates and Echinodermata, which together form the Ambulacraria. The Chordata and Ambulacraria together form the superphylum Deuterostomia.

=== Hemichordates ===
Hemichordates ("half chordates") have some features similar to those of chordates: branchial openings that open into the pharynx and look rather like gill slits; stomochords, similar in composition to notochords, but running in a circle around the "collar", which is ahead of the mouth; and a dorsal nerve cord—but also a smaller ventral nerve cord.

There are two living groups of hemichordates. The solitary enteropneusts, commonly known as "acorn worms", have long proboscises and worm-like bodies with up to 200 branchial slits, are up to 2.5 metres (8.2 ft) long, and burrow though seafloor sediments. Pterobranchs are colonial animals, often less than 1 millimetre (0.039 in) long individually, whose dwellings are interconnected. Each filter feeds by means of a pair of branched tentacles, and has a short, shield-shaped proboscis. The extinct graptolites, colonial animals whose fossils look like tiny hacksaw blades, lived in tubes like those of pterobranchs.

=== Echinoderms ===
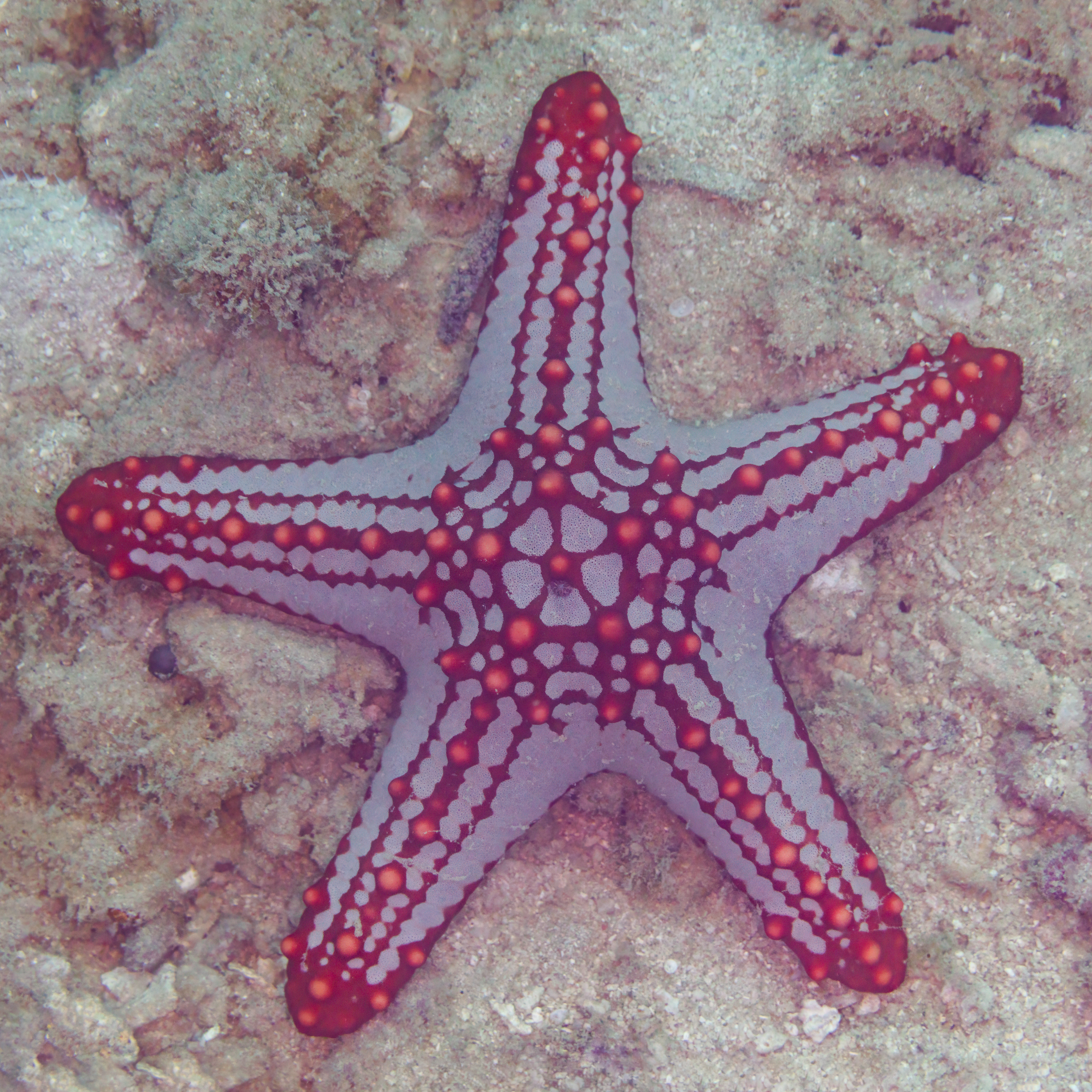
A red knob sea star Protoreaster linckii is an example of an asterozoan echinoderm.

Echinoderms differ from chordates and their other relatives in three conspicuous ways: they possess bilateral symmetry only as larvae – in adulthood they have radial symmetry, meaning that their body pattern is shaped like a wheel; they have tube feet; and their bodies are supported by dermal skeletons made of calcite, a material not used by chordates. Their hard, calcified shells keep their bodies well protected from the environment, and these skeletons enclose their bodies but are also covered by thin skins. The feet are powered by another unique feature of echinoderms, a water vascular system of canals that also functions as a "lung" and is surrounded by muscles that act as pumps. Crinoids are typically sessile and look rather like flowers (hence the common name "sea lilies") and use their feather-like arms to filter food particles out of the water; most live anchored to rocks, but a few species can move very slowly. Other echinoderms are mobile and take a variety of body shapes, for example, starfish and brittle stars, sea urchins, and sea cucumbers.

== See also ==
- Chordate genomics – Study of the evolution of the chordate clade
- List of chordate orders
