= PRR16 =

Protein-coding gene in humans

Identifiers
- Aliases: PRR16, DSC54, LARGEN, proline rich 16
- External IDs: OMIM: 615931; MGI: 1918623; GeneCards: PRR16

Gene location (Human)
Chr.	Chromosome 5 (human)
Band	5q23.1	Start	120,464,300 bp
Band	5q23.1	End	120,687,332 bp

Gene location (Mouse)
Chr.	Chromosome 18 (mouse)
Band	18|18 D1	Start	51,250,805 bp
Band	18|18 D1	End	51,553,116 bp
RNA expression pattern
Bgee	Human / Mouse (ortholog); Top expressed in: stromal cell of endometrium; Descending thoracic aorta; oocyte; ascending aorta; muscle of thigh; secondary oocyte; vastus lateralis muscle; right lung; right coronary artery; tibial arteries / Top expressed in: liver; molar; genital tubercle; left lobe of liver; embryo; superior frontal gyrus; white adipose tissue; dentate gyrus of hippocampal formation granule cell; visual cortex; primary visual cortex; More reference expression data
BioGPS	n/a
Orthologs
Databases	NCBI: entry; OMA: entry
Species	Human	Mouse
Entrez	51334	71373
Ensembl	ENSG00000184838	ENSMUSG00000073565
UniProt	Q569H4	A3KMN5
RefSeq (mRNA)	NM_001300783; NM_001308087; NM_001308088; NM_016644	NM_001081224
RefSeq (protein)	NP_001287712; NP_001295016; NP_001295017; NP_057728	NP_001074693
Location (UCSC)	Chr 5: 120.46 – 120.69 Mb	Chr 18: 51.25 – 51.55 Mb
PubMed search
- Wikidata
View/Edit Human	View/Edit Mouse

Proline-rich protein 16 (PRR16) is a protein coding gene in Homo sapiens. The protein is known by the alias Largen.

== Gene ==
=== Locus ===
PRR16 is located on the long arm of chromosome 5. It is found at position 5q23.1. It has five known transcripts.

=== Size ===
PRR16 spans 330,365 bases and encodes for a mRNA that is 1,707 nucleotides. The resulting protein is 304 amino acids long.

== mRNA ==
=== Splice Variants ===
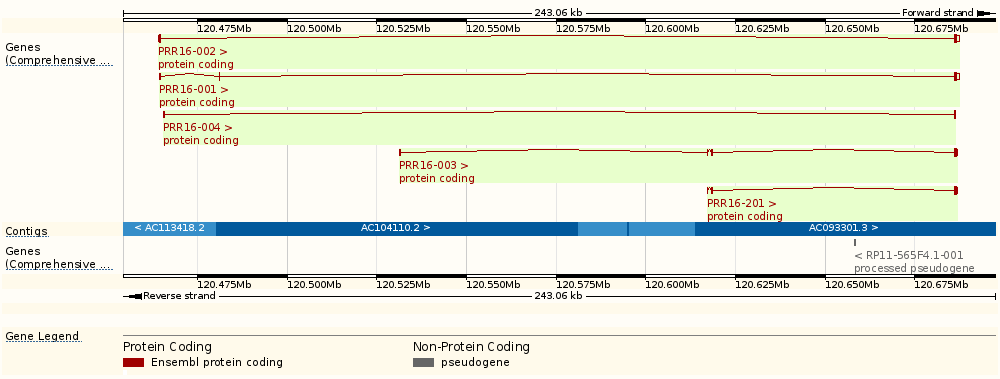
PRR16 has five known splice variants, each with a different processed transcript.

=== Isoforms ===
There are three known isoforms of PRR16. Isoform 2 contains an additional exon in the 5' region, and it thus differs in the 5' UTR and initiates translation at an alternate start codon, compared to variant 1. Isoform 3 has two variants. The first contains an alternate 5' terminal exon, and it thus differs in the 5' UTR and initiates translation at a downstream in-frame start codon, compared to variant 1. The second contains alternate 5' exon structure, and it thus differs in the 5' UTR and initiates translation at a downstream in-frame start codon, compared to variant 1. All three isoforms are shorter at the N-terminus, compared to isoform 1.

== Protein ==
=== Structure ===
==== Primary Structure ====
The PRR16 protein is 304 amino acids in length. It has a molecular weight of 32.8 kDa and an isoelectric point of 8.09. The protein does not interact with the membrane.

==== Secondary Structure ====
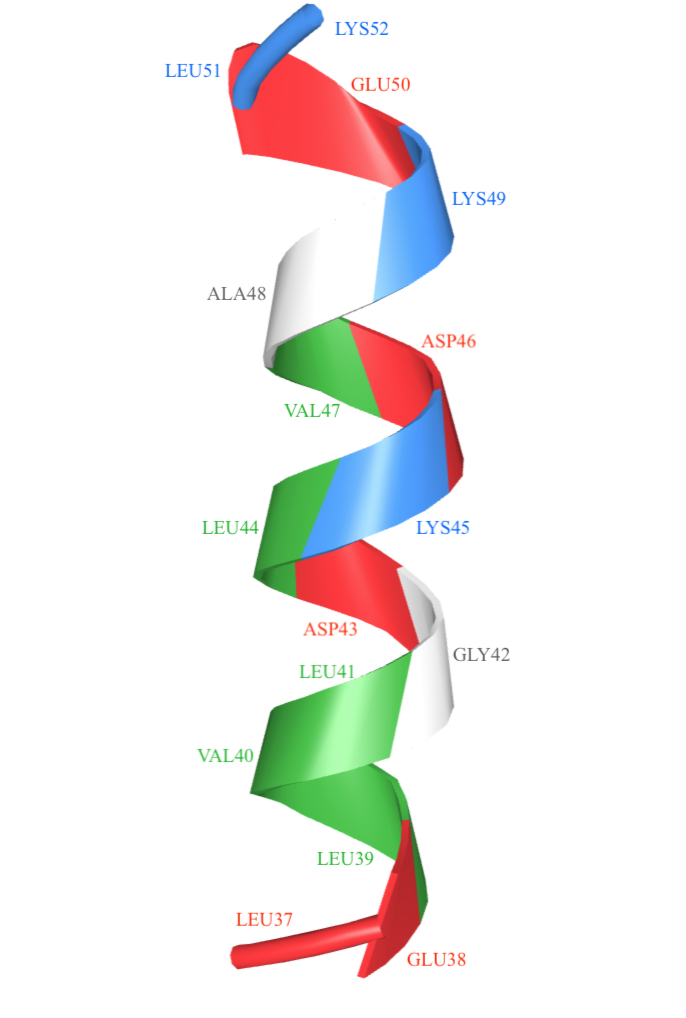
α-helix from amino acid 38 to 52 of PRR16 determined by PHYRE2

The only predictable feature of the PRR16 protein is an α-helix near the N-terminus, spanning about thirty amino acids. The remainder of the protein has a disordered structure.

==== Tertiary Structure ====
This structure was predicted by analyzing the amino acid sequence using I-TASSER. The final result can be seen below.

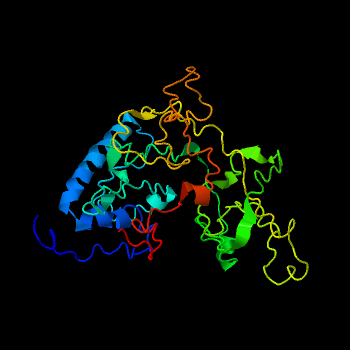
I-TASSER software was used to predict the tertiary structure of PRR16. The blue coils indicate the presence of α-helices, while the remainder is relatively disordered.

=== Post-Translational Modifications ===
- Predicted glycation at Lys 4, Lys 6, Lys 49, Lys 94, Lys 96, Lys 105, Lys 119, Lys 148, Lys 181, and Lys 290.
- Predicted nuclear export signals (NES) at Leu 39 and Leu 41.
- Predicted O-linked glycosylation sites at Ser 2, Ser 5, Ser 10, Ser 11, Ser 12, Ser 75, Thr 79, Ser 82, Ser 83, Ser 84, Ser 85, Ser 87, Thr 88, Ser 91, Ser 111, Thr 130, Thr 143, Thr 149, Glu 235, Leu 254, Ser 270, Ser 272, Ser 274, Thr 282, Thr 287, Thr 294, Ser 299, and Thr 300.
- Predicted phosphorylation at Ser 2, Ser 5, Ser 10, Ser 11, Ser 22, Ser 74, Ser 75, Ser 82, Ser 83, Ser 84, Ser 85, Ser 87, Ser 91, Thr 115, Thr 130, Thr 152, Tyr 224, Thr 254, Thr 282, Ser 299, Thr 300, and Thr 303.
- Predicted sumoylation at site Lys 133.

== Subcellular Location ==
The k-NN tool suggests the location of PRR16 in the nucleus of the cell with 52.2% certainty. The cytoplasm was predicted with 30.4% certainty, The following locations were predicted with 4.3% certainty: cytoskeleton, plasma membrane, mitochondria, and peroxisome.

== Expression ==
The PRR16 gene is expressed at very low levels throughout the body. It is expressed in the skeletal muscle, heart, lung, skin, portions of the brain, and bone marrow.

== Interacting Proteins ==
Protein	Function	Tool
Abelson-interactor 2 (ABI2)	Regulation of cell growth and actin filament reorganization	Biogrid, IntAct, Mentha
Amyloid precursor protein (APP)	Caspase activation and degeneration of both neuronal cell bodies	Biogrid, InnateDB, Mentha
Death-associated protein kinase 1 (DAPK1)	Positive mediator of programmed cell death	Biogrid, IntAct
Neural precursor cell expressed developmentally downregulated protein 4-like (NEDD4L)	E3 ubiquitin-protein ligase	Biogrid, InnateDB, Mentha
Neural precursor cell expressed developmentally downregulated protein 4 (NEDD4)	E3 ubiquitin-protein ligase	Biogrid, InnateDB
Nucleotide-binding oligomerization domain-containing protein 2 (NOD2)	Involved in gastrointestinal immunity	Biogrid
Protein phosphatase 1 catalytic subunit alpha (PPP1CA)	Cell division, regulation of glycogen metabolism, muscle contractility, and protein synthesis	Biogrid, InnateDB, IntAct, Mentha
Protein phosphatase 1 catalytic subunit gamma (PPP1CC)	Cell division, regulation of glycogen metabolism, muscle contractility, and protein synthesis	Biogrid, InnateDB, Mentha
SMAD ubiquitin regulatory factor 1 (SMURF1)	E3 ubiquitin-protein ligase	Biogrid, Mentha

== Homology ==
=== Paralogs ===
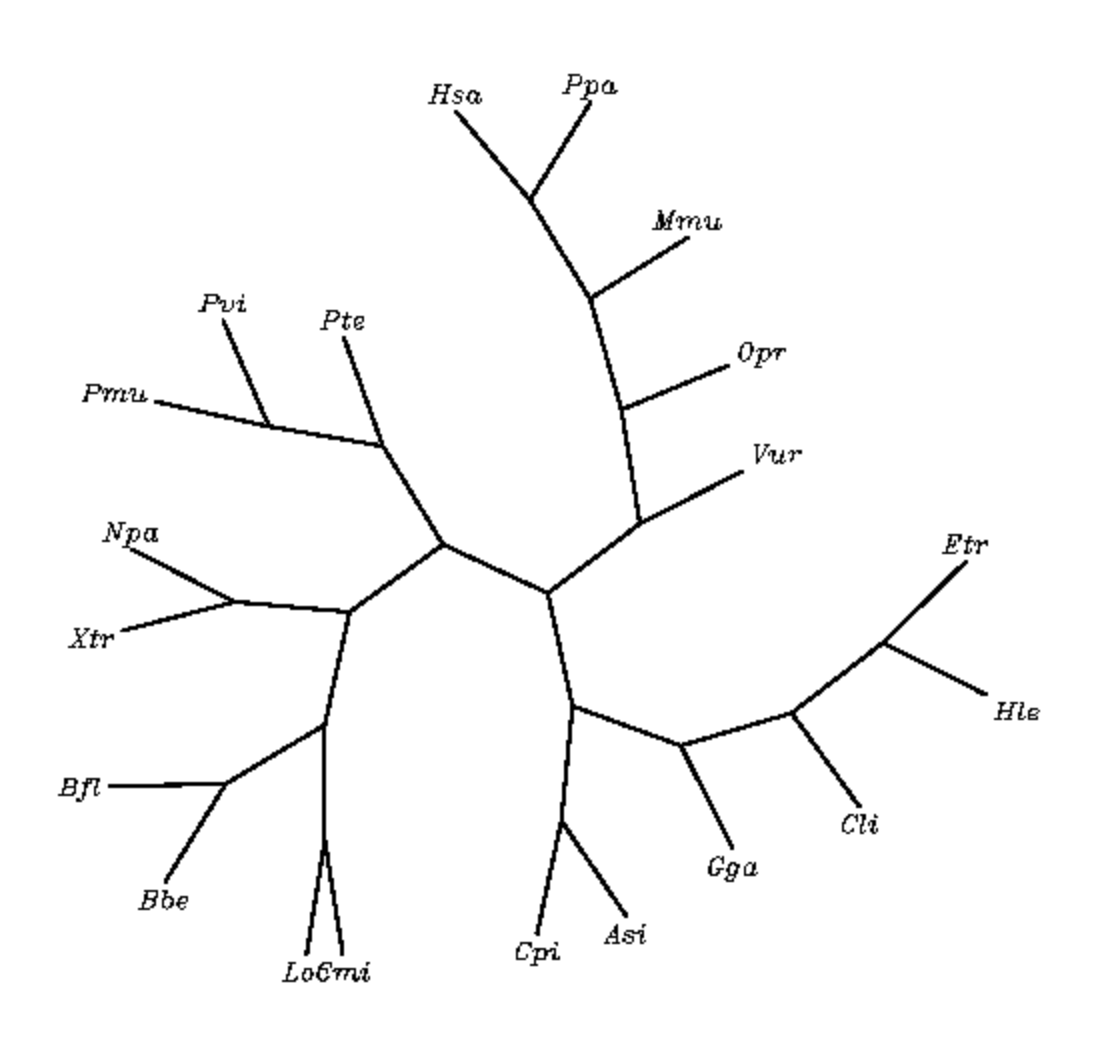
Unrooted phylogenetic tree of vertebrate and invertebrate PRR16 orthologs. All abbreviations are the first two letters of genus name and first letter of species name. Tree made with a Neighbor-Joining method using a ClustalW-formatted set of sequences as input.

There are two isoforms of Inhibitory synaptic factor 1 that are known paralogs of PRR16.

=== Orthologs ===
PRR16 is found in all classes of vertebrates, including mammals, birds, fish, reptiles and amphibians. The most distant ortholog of PRR16 is in Branchiostoma belcheri and Branchiostoma floridae, which diverged an estimated 684 million years ago. The gene has not been found in any plants, fungi or single celled organisms. The table below compares the known orthologs.

Organism	Common name	Class	Accession number	Sequence Identity	Sequence Similarity
Homo sapiens	Human	Mammalia	NP_001287712.1	100%	100%
Pan paniscus	Bonobo	Mammalia	XP_003826752.1	99%	100%
Mus musculus	House mouse	Mammalia	NP_001074693.1	93%	95%
Ochotona princeps	American pika	Mammalia	XP_004586413.1	91%	94%
Vombatus ursinus	Common wombat	Mammalia	XP_027730777.1	87%	81%
Podarcis muralis	Common wall lizard	Reptilia	XP_028604016.1	88%	91%
Alligator sinensis	Chinese alligator	Reptilia	XP_006033732.1	86%	89%
Chrysemys picta bellii	Painted turtle	Reptilia	XP_005305197.1	88%	91%
Pogona vitticeps	Central bearded dragon	Reptilia	XP_020659290.1	84%	86%
Pseudonaja textilis	Eastern brown snake	Reptilia	XP_026576168.1	81%	84%
Gallus gallus	Chicken	Aves	XP_001232593.3	81%	85%
Columba livia	Rock pigeon	Aves	XP_005506281.1	85%	89%
Haliaeetus leucocephalus	Bald eagle	Aves	XP_010560635.1	82%	86%
Empidonax traillii	Willow flycatcher	Aves	XP_027735123.1	82%	86%
Nanorana parkeri	High Himalaya frog	Amphibia	XP_018426570.1	71%	79%
Xenopus tropicalis	Western clawed frog	Amphibia	XP_017946181.1	72%	79%
Lepisosteus oculatus	Spotted gar fish	Actinopterygii	XP_006626913.1	65%	77%
Callorhinchus milii	Australian ghostshark	Chondrichthyes	XP_007897515.1	64%	75%
Branchiostoma belcheri	Lancelet	Amphioxiformes	XP_019614579.1	47%	78%
Branchiostoma floridae	Lancelet	Amphioxiformes	XP_002601582.1	47%	78%
