= Cirri =

Cirri may refer to:

- Cirri, the plural form of:
  - Cirrus (zoology), any of various thin, thread-like structures on the body of an animal including:
    - Buccal cirri, feeding structures found in the oral hood of lancets
  - Cirrus (botany), a tendril
  - Infrared cirrus, in astronomy, filamentary structures seen in infrared light
  - Cirrus cloud, a type of cloud
- CIRRI (plant), the EPPO code of Cirsium rivulare
- CIRRI (radio service), Central Indiana Radio Reading (now WFYI-FM IRIS)
- CIRRI, the Centre interuniversitaire de recherche sur la Renaissance italienne at Sorbonne University
- Cirrí Sur, a district of Costa Rica
- Giovanni Battista Cirri, an Italian cellist and composer
- Ignazio Cirri, an Italian organist and composer
