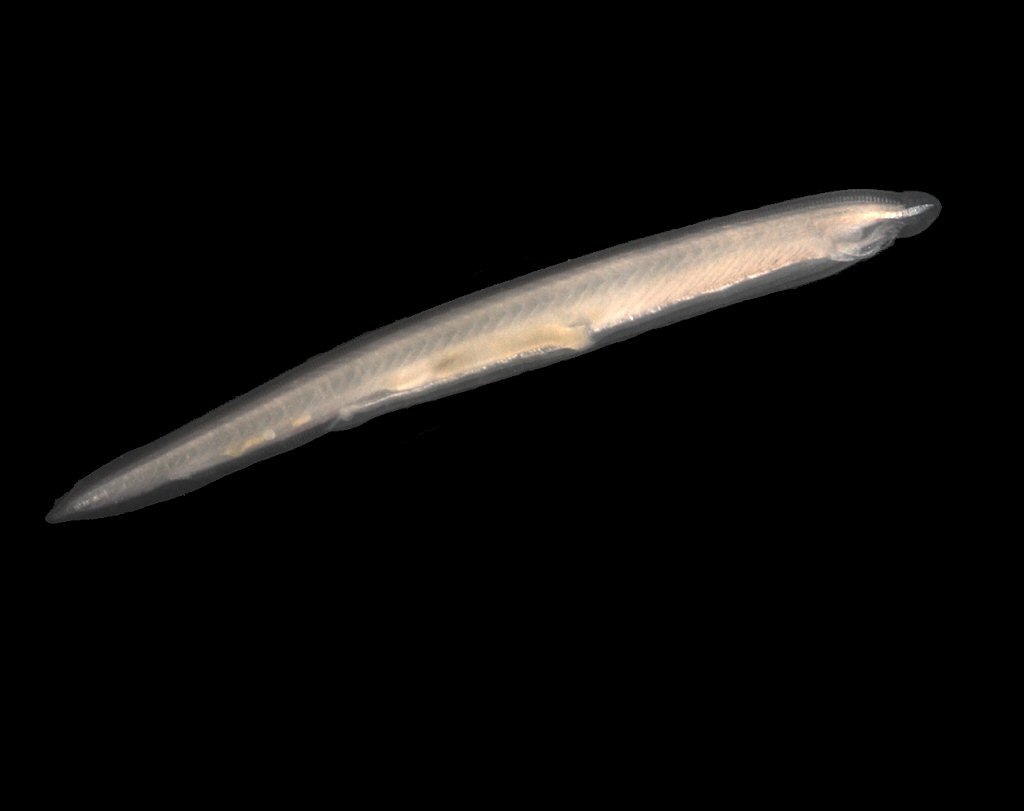
- Branchiostoma lanceolatum

Scientific classification
- Kingdom: Animalia
- Phylum: Chordata
- Subphylum: Cephalochordata
- Class: Leptocardii
- Family: Branchiostomatidae
- Genus: Branchiostoma
- Species: B. lanceolatum

Binomial name
- Branchiostoma lanceolatum (Pallas, 1774)

Synonyms
- Limax lanceolatus Pallas, 1774; Branchiostoma lubricum Costa, 1834; Amphioxus lanceolatus Yarrel, 1836; Branchiostoma haecklii Franz, 1922

= Branchiostoma lanceolatum =

Species of lancelet

Branchiostoma lanceolatum, the European lancelet or Mediterranean amphioxus is a lancelet in the subphylum Cephalochordata. It is a marine invertebrate with a notochord but no backbone and is used as a model organism to study the evolutionary development of vertebrates.

== Anatomy ==
Anatomical diagram of Branchiostoma lanceolatum

Branchiostoma lanceolatum has an elongated body, flattened laterally and pointed at both ends. A stiffening rod of tightly packed cells, the notochord, extends the whole length of the body. Unlike vertebrates, the notochord persists in the adult, in the form of a simple dorsal neural tube slightly thickened in the anterior part (the cerebral vesicle). Above it is a nerve cord with a single frontal eye. The mouth is on the underside of the body and is surrounded by a tuft of 20 or 30 cirri or slender sensory appendages. The gut runs just below the notochord from the mouth to the anus, in front of the tail. There is a flap-like, vertical fin surrounding the pointed tail. Gas exchange takes place as water passes through gill slits in the mid region, and segmented gonads lie just behind these. The animal is pearly white and semi-transparent which enables the internal organs to be seen from outside. Its appearance is similar to a "primitive fish". It can grow up to 6 cm (2.5 in) long.

== Distribution and habitat ==
Branchiostoma lanceolatum is found in shallow seas in the north-east Atlantic Ocean, from 67°N in Norway south to the Mediterranean Sea and east to the Black Sea. Its range has expanded through the Suez Canal to the northerly parts of the Indian Ocean and the coasts of East Africa. It burrows in soft substrates such as sand, gravel and shell fragments and is quite particular as to the size of the particles. It occurs from the low tide mark down to about 40 metres (130 ft).

== Biology ==
In the North Sea, breeding takes place in June and July. The mature adult Branchiostoma lanceolatum, aged 2 to 3 years, congregate in masses on the sea floor. Individuals are either male or female and spawn once a year. The eggs are laid and fertilisation takes place externally. The early larval stages take place in the substrate but a little later, the larvae become pelagic. They are elongated and flattened laterally and have a swollen region around the gill slits. These slits number 6 to 19, the number increasing as the larva passes through its various stages. The larvae have a vertical daily migration. Each evening they rise to near the surface of the sea and in the morning they sink through the water column, feeding on phytoplankton, copepods and detritus as they descend. While in these surface waters they drift with the current. The larval stage lasts for up to 200 days. Toll-like receptors (TLR's) act as important mediators of the inflammatory pathways for creating an innate immune response in chordates. Data has demonstrated evidence that amphioxus TLRs maintained a similar framework as it pertains to protein structure, while also demonstrating similar features to TLRs of invertebrates despite their lineage. In short, TLRS in amphioxus propose a paraphyletic relationship with the vertebrate TLR lineage.

== Research ==
The mitochondrial genome of Branchiostoma lanceolatum has been sequenced, and the species serves as a model organism for studying the development of vertebrates. The way the coding genes and the two rRNA genes are organised is the same as the organisational method used by the sea lamprey (Petromyzon marinus). These data, among others, suggest a close relationship between Branchiostoma lanceolatum and the vertebrates.

Adults can be induced to spawn in the laboratory with a thermal shock several times per year. Metamorphosis in the lab takes place in 1 to 3 months. Since 2015, a merged effort from different labs working on this species, the Amphiencode consortium, provides a centralized platform on which genomic data is publicly accessible.

== Molecular taxonomy ==
A recent study, using a multilocus molecular approach and comparing specimens from different European populations, confirms the presence of a single species across the range spanning the type localities of Branchiostoma lanceolatum (Atlantic Ocean) and its junior synonym Branchiostoma lubricum (Mediterranean Sea), with no evidence of geographic structuring among populations. The prolonged larval phase and the low mutation rate observed in lancelets have likely played a key role in the evolutionary history of this emblematic species.
