= Asymmetron inferum =

Scientific classification
- Kingdom: Animalia
- Phylum: Chordata
- Subphylum: Cephalochordata
- Class: Leptocardii
- Family: Branchiostomatidae
- Genus: Asymmetron
- Species: A. inferum

Binomial name
- Asymmetron inferum Nishikawa, 2004

Species of lancelet

Asymmetron inferum, the whale-fall lancelet, is a species of lancelet that is native to reducing habitats of the Northwest Pacific Ocean of Japan. A. inferum is unique among lancelets for seemingly preferring the anaerobic conditions of reducing habitats.

== Taxonomy ==
The date of divergence between Asymmetron inferum and its sister group, the Asymmetron lucayanum complex, is estimated to be between 115 and 97 million years ago, during the middle Cretaceous. Dating to well before the evolution of whales, it is likely this species relied on carcass-falls of marine reptiles and other vertebrates.
