= Branchiostoma japonicum =

Scientific classification
- Kingdom: Animalia
- Phylum: Chordata
- Subphylum: Cephalochordata
- Class: Leptocardii
- Family: Branchiostomatidae
- Genus: Branchiostoma
- Species: B. japonicum

Binomial name
- Branchiostoma japonicum (Willey, 1897)

Synonyms
- Amphioxus japonicus Willey, 1897; Branchiostoma belcheri japonicum (Willey, 1897); Branchiostoma belcheri tsingtauense Tchang-Shi & Koo, 1936; Branchiostoma nakagawae Jordan & Snyder, 1901

Species of lancelet

Branchiostoma japonicum, the Japanese lancelet, is a species of lancelet within the family Branchiostomatidae. The species grows to lengths of 50 to 60 millimeters in length and inhabits waters off the coasts of China and Japan. In Xiamen, the lancelets inhabiting the waters were originally thought to be of Branchiostoma belcheri in 1932, however recent studies revealed B. japonicum is also present in the lancelet populations.
