= DGLUCY =

Protein-coding gene in the species Homo sapiens

Identifiers
- Aliases: DGLUCY, C14orf159, chromosome 14 open reading frame 159, D-glutamate cyclase
- External IDs: MGI: 2444813; GeneCards: DGLUCY
Enzyme activity
EC #	BRENDA	ExPASy	KEGG	MetaCyc
4.2.1.48	↗	↗	↗	↗

Gene location (Human)
Chr.	Chromosome 14 (human)
Band	14q32.11	Start	91,060,333 bp
Band	14q32.11	End	91,225,632 bp

Gene location (Mouse)
Chr.	Chromosome 12 (mouse)
Band	12|12 E	Start	100,745,316 bp
Band	12|12 E	End	100,863,240 bp
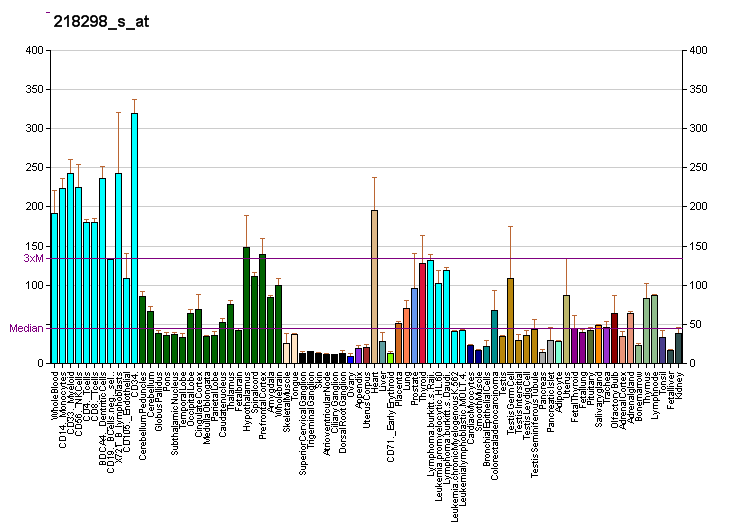
RNA expression pattern
Bgee	Human / Mouse (ortholog); Top expressed in: apex of heart; left ventricle; right auricle of heart; muscle of thigh; triceps brachii muscle; gastrocnemius muscle; body of tongue; body of stomach; fundus; granulocyte / Top expressed in: right kidney; interventricular septum; human kidney; lacrimal gland; proximal tubule; granulocyte; duodenum; muscle of thigh; left lobe of liver; right ventricle; More reference expression data
BioGPS	More reference expression data
Gene ontology
Molecular function	protein binding; D-glutamate cyclase activity; lyase activity; molecular function
Cellular component	mitochondrion; mitochondrial matrix; cellular component
Biological process	glutamate metabolic process; biological process
Sources:Amigo / QuickGO
Orthologs
Databases	NCBI: entry; OMA: entry
Species	Human	Mouse
Entrez	80017	217830
Ensembl	ENSG00000133943	ENSMUSG00000021185
UniProt	Q7Z3D6	Q8BH86
RefSeq (mRNA)	NM_024952; NM_001102366; NM_001102367; NM_001102368; NM_001102369 NM_001286470; NM_001286471; NM_001286472; NM_001286473; NM_001358310; NM_001358311; NM_001358312	NM_145448; NM_001361017; NM_001361020; NM_001361023
RefSeq (protein)	NP_001095836; NP_001095837; NP_001095838; NP_001095839; NP_001273399 NP_001273400; NP_001273401; NP_001273402; NP_079228; NP_001345239; NP_001345240; NP_001345241	NP_663423; NP_001347946; NP_001347949; NP_001347952
Location (UCSC)	Chr 14: 91.06 – 91.23 Mb	Chr 12: 100.75 – 100.86 Mb
PubMed search
- Wikidata
View/Edit Human	View/Edit Mouse

DGLUCY (D-glutamate cyclase) is a protein that in humans is encoded by the DGLUCY gene.

== Orthologs ==
The human gene, DGLUCY, is highly conserved in mammals and birds. Orthologs gathered from BLAST and BLAT searches reveal that the human DGLUCY mRNA sequence is conserved with a sequence identity of 98% in chimpanzees, 88% in mice, and 81% in platypus and chicken. The following table contains a list orthologs that were gathered from BLAST searches. Sequence alignments were performed using blastn to derive sequence identity, score, and E-values between the human c14orf159 variant 1 mRNA and its orthologs.

Human C14orf159 Orthologs-mRNA
Genus and species	Common name	NCBI accession number	Sequence length (bp)	Sequence identity	Score	E-value
Homo sapiens	Human	NM_001102366	3164	100%		0
Pan troglodytes	Chimpanzee	XM_510121	2974	98%	4281	0
Mus musculus	Mouse	NM_145448	3231	88%	495	0
Ornithorhynchus anatinus	Platypus	XM_00154336.1	1962	81%	217	0
Gallus gallus	Chicken	XM_421319	3389	81	50	0

The protein that the human gene DGLUCY encodes has been found to be highly conserved among mammals, birds, amphibians, fish, tunicates, cnidarians, and echinoderms. However, no protein orthologs have been found in nematodes, arthropods, fungi, protists, plants, bacteria, or archea. Fungi and bacteria contain the DUF1445 conserved domain which is found in human c14orf159 and its orthologs. BLAST and BLAT searches have been utilized to find orthologs to the c14orf159 protein. The following table lists protein orthologs for the human protein with sequence identity, sequence similarity, scores, and E-values derived from blastp sequence comparisons.

Human C14orf159 Orthologs-protein
Genus and species	Common name	NCBI accession number	Sequence length-amino acids	Sequence identity	Sequence similarity	Score	E-value
Homo sapiens	Human	NP_001095839.1	564	100%	100%		0
Pan troglodytes	Chimpanzee	XP_510121.2	724	557/621 (89%)	561/621 (90%)	1109	0
Ailuropoda melanoleuca	Panda	EFB15996.1	585	413/585 (70%)	461/585 (78%)	824	0
Rattus norvegicus	Rat	XP_343096.2	618	423/618 (68%)	470/618 (76%)	774	0
Mus musculus	Mouse	NP_663423.2	617	414/623 (66%)	468/621 (75%)	796	0
Equus caballus	Horse	XP_001916913.1	581	390/585 (66%)	433/585 (74%)	728	6E-115
Ornithorhynchus anatinus	Platypus	XP_001514386.1	653	358/628 (57%)	443/628 (70%)	696	0
Gallus gallus	Chicken	XP_421319.2	617	330/614 (53%)	414/614 (67%)	630	0
Xenopus tropicalis	Western clawed frog	CAJ82045.1	616	302/611 (49%)	399/611 (65%)	582	1E-170
Danio rerio	Zebrafish	AAI244131.1	621	284/607 (46%)	386/607 (63%)	530	6E-155
Branchiostoma floridae	Lancelet	XP_002612376.1	615	237/611 (38%)	334/611 (54%)	397	6E-115
Ciona intestinalis	Vase tunicate	XP_001173256	486	161/501 (32%)	241/501 (48%)	244	5E-69
Strongylocentrotus purpuratus	California purple sea urchin	XP_782739.1	631	9/33 (27%)	15/33 (45%)	320	5E-87
Nematostella vectensis	Starlet sea anemone	XP_001637867	529	134/501 (26%)	211/501 (42%)	120	1E-31

== Post-translational modification ==
The protein product of the DGLUCY gene is predicted and was found to be translocated to mitochondrion.

Post-translational modifications are predicted for the protein DGLUCY. All predicted sites in human DGLUCY were compared to orthologs using multiple sequence alignments to determine likelihood of modification.

== Regulation ==
Estrogen receptor alpha, in the presence of estradiol, binds to the DGLUCY gene and likely regulates its expression.
