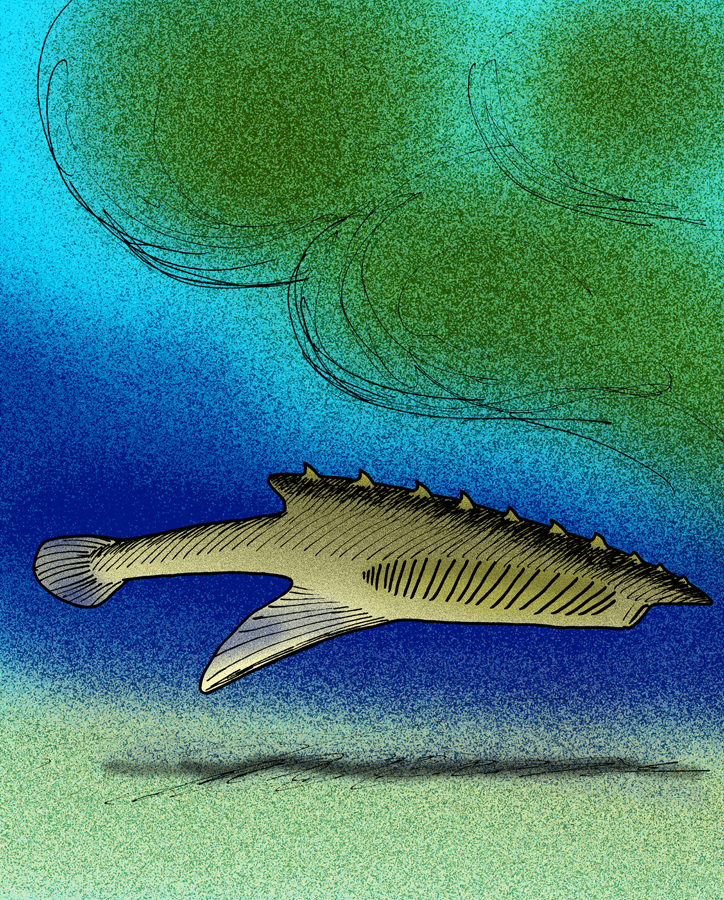
- Artist's restoration

Scientific classification
- Kingdom: Animalia
- Phylum: Chordata
- Genus: †Palaeobranchiostoma; Oelofsen & Loock 1981
- Species: †P. hamatoterga

Binomial name
- †Palaeobranchiostoma hamatoterga Oelofsen & Loock 1981

= Palaeobranchiostoma =

Palaeobranchiostoma Temporal range: Kungurian

Extinct genus of chordates

Palaeobranchiostoma hamatotergum is an extinct chordate from the Early Permian-aged Whitehill Formation in South Africa. It is known from a single, 11 mm long specimen found in black shale. The body shows the presence of a notochord-like structrure running along the length of the body, gill slits, and several unpaired fins, including a tail (caudal) fin with rays that is round and small, a pronounced pelvic fin and a humped dorsal fin covered in spikes. In its original description it was considered to be a cephalochordate (also known as a lancelet), though some other authors have considered its placement in the group as not definitive, due to a number of aspects of its anatomy like the fins being strongly divergent from living lancelets.
