= Branchiostoma bennetti =

Scientific classification
- Kingdom: Animalia
- Phylum: Chordata
- Subphylum: Cephalochordata
- Class: Leptocardii
- Family: Branchiostomatidae
- Genus: Branchiostoma
- Species: B. bennetti

Binomial name
- Branchiostoma bennetti Boschung & Gunter, 1966

Species of lancelet

Branchiostoma bennetti, the mud lancelet, is a lancelet of the genus Branchiostoma endemic to the Gulf of Mexico, where it is found in the northern part.

== Description ==
Like other lancelets in the genus Branchiostoma, B. bennetti occurs in inshore waters where it burrows into sand or muddy sand at depths down to about 12 m (40 ft). The body is laterally flattened and pointed at both ends. It has a long dorsal fin and another fin on its ventral surface, and a caudal fin at the rear end. B. bennetti differs from other western Atlantic lancelets for having the longest buccal cirri among them. These cirri are further unique in this region because of their extended lateral projections. It is presumed that these unique buccal cirri are an adaptation to living in a muddier habitat than other species.
