= Branchiostoma africae =

Scientific classification
- Kingdom: Animalia
- Phylum: Chordata
- Subphylum: Cephalochordata
- Class: Leptocardii
- Family: Branchiostomatidae
- Genus: Branchiostoma
- Species: B. africae

Binomial name
- Branchiostoma africae Hubbs, 1927.

Species of lancelet

Branchiostoma africae is a species of lancelets, a subphylum of chordates.

== Habitat & distribution ==
Branchiostoma africae is a marine lancelet, living in coastal waters, buried in sandy or muddy substrates. its habitat is in the Atlantic and Indian Oceans, though data is limited.

== Description ==
Branchiostoma africae is a filter feeder, drawing water through its mouth and trapping plankton and organic particles using cilia and mucus. It plays a role in benthic ecosystems by contributing to nutrient cycling and sediment turnover.
