= Hepatic caecum =

Hepatic caecum or hepatic cecum is a name used in describing various physiological structures in some crustaceans, insects and lancelets. "Hepatic" refers to the liver, and the hepatic caecum may perform some functions that are analogous to the functions of the liver in vertebrates (except for lancelets, whose "proto-liver" is homologous).

== Amphioxus ==
A digestive organ called the hepatic caecum is found in the cephalochordate amphioxus, or lancelet. The hepatic caecum of the amphioxus is a presumed homologue of the vertebrate liver, although it is not undisputed. This homology was first hypothesized by Müller in 1844.

== Crustaceans ==
The hepatic caecum is a name given to various digestive structures found in certain crustaceans.

== Insects ==
In some insects, such as the grasshopper, several pairs of hepatic caeca secrete enzymes into the stomach where they assist in the digestive process.
