= Epipharyngeal groove =

The epipharyngeal groove is a ciliated groove along the dorsal side of the inside of the pharynx in some plankton-feeding early chordates, such as Amphioxus. It helps to carry a stream of mucus with plankton stuck in it, through the pharynx into the gut to be digested.

The subnotochordal rod or hypochord is a transient structure that appears ventral to the notochord in the heads of embryos of some vertebrates. Its appearance is stimulated by a chemical secreted by the notochord. The subnotochordal rod helps to stimulate development of the dorsal aorta.

There is an opinion that these two structures are homologous.
