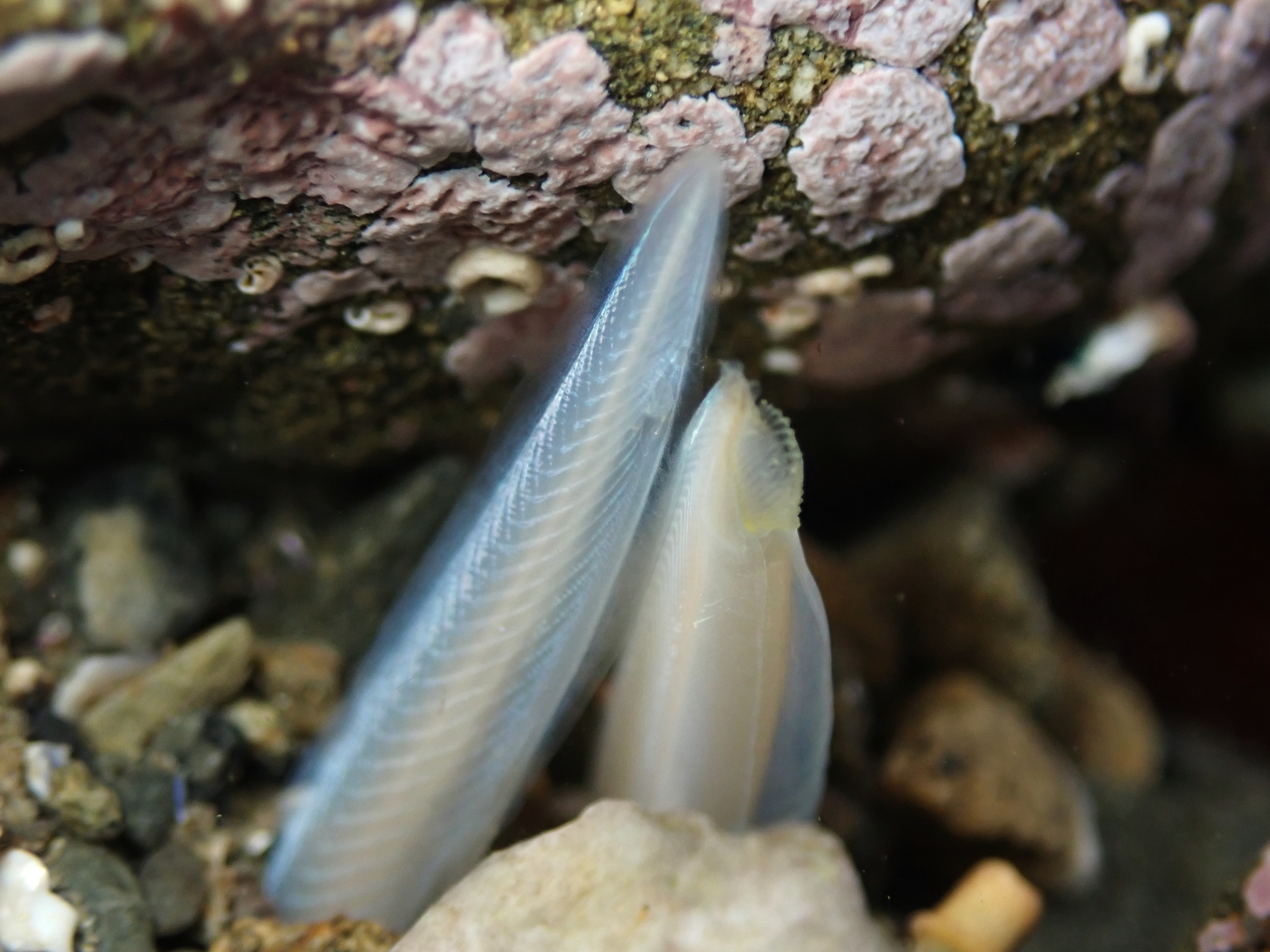

Scientific classification
- Kingdom: Animalia
- Phylum: Chordata
- Subphylum: Cephalochordata
- Class: Leptocardii
- Family: Branchiostomatidae
- Genus: Epigonichthys
- Species: E. hectori

Binomial name
- Epigonichthys hectori (Benham, 1901)

Synonyms
- Heteropleuron hectori Benham, 1901

= Epigonichthys hectori =

Species of lancelet

Epigonichthys hectori is a species of lancelet in the family Branchiostomatidae. The species is the only known lancelet species found in New Zealand, rarely being caught for having specific habitat needs of clean coarse sand. It inhabits these sandy areas around the North Island and northern parts of the South Island at depths up to 55 meters below sea level, with one recent individual being found on the coasts of Urquharts Bay near the Whangārei Heads in 2023 after being stranded in a puddle during low-tide.
