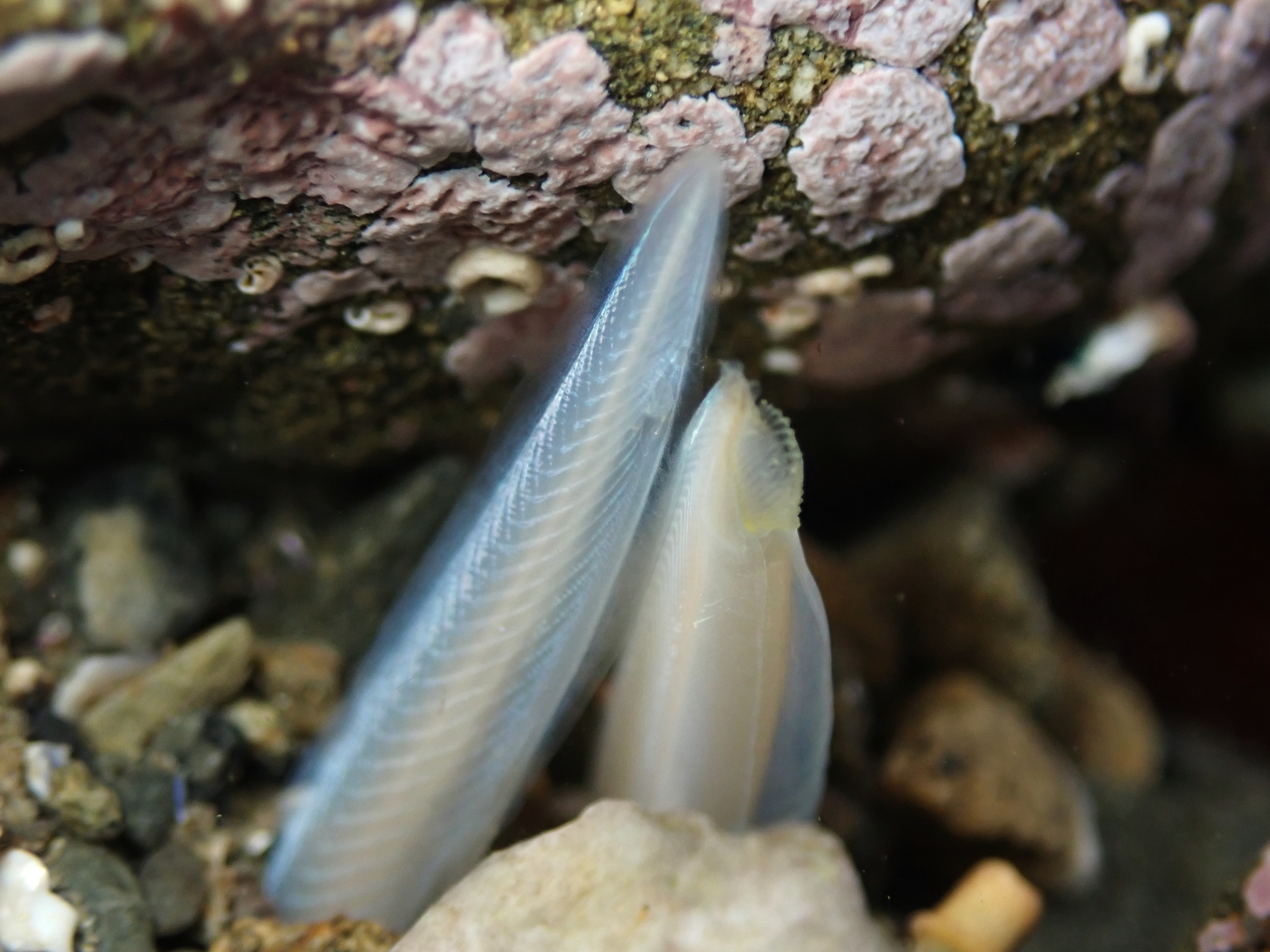
- Epigonichthys hectori

Scientific classification
- Kingdom: Animalia
- Phylum: Chordata
- Subphylum: Cephalochordata
- Class: Leptocardii
- Family: Branchiostomatidae
- Genus: Epigonichthys; Peters, 1876

Type species
- Epigonichthys cultellus

= Epigonichthys =

Genus of lancelets

Epigonichthys is a genus of lancelets belonging to the family Branchiostomatidae. The genus was first described in 1876 by Wilhelm Peters. The type species is Epigonichthys cultellus.

Epigonichthys can grow to 60 mm (2.4 in). The species of this genus are found in Central America, Malesia, Australia.

== Species ==
- Epigonichthys australis (Raffe, 1912)
- Epigonichthys bassanus (Günther, 1884)
- Epigonichthys cingalensis (Kirkaldy, 1894)
- Epigonichthys cultellus (Peters, 1876)
- Epigonichthys hectori (Benham, 1901)
- Epigonichthys maldivensis (Forster Cooper, 1903)
