= Buccal cirri =

Buccal cirri are feeding structures found in the oral hood of primitive jawless organisms called amphioxus. The word buccal is derived from the term bucca which means "cheek" and cirri is derived from the Latin word cerrus meaning a tendril or a small and flexible appendage.

== Structure ==
Cirri, plural for cirrus, are small, filament-like appendages that act like tentacles. Tentacles are elongated appendages from the cephalic region of organisms that aid in sensory and locomotive abilities. Buccal cirri extend from the oral hood on the anterior portion of the organism. The buccal cirri possess receptors, some of which are believed to be mechanoreceptors. Mechanoreceptors are sensory receptors on the surface of the body. The presence of external particles can be detected by an organism possessing buccal cirri due to the sensory abilities associated with the mechanoreceptors. Additionally, the touch and pressure sensory receptors aid in the mechanical sorting of food particles. Chemical sorting of particles occurs through the use of chemoreceptors, which are believed to be present within the buccal cirri structure. Food and fluid particles passing through buccal cirri are sorted using chemoreceptors, which respond to chemical stimuli. Responses to stimuli are sent to higher order processing centers like the brain and nerve cord. The transmission of signals to higher order processing centers allows the organism to become aware of what type of particles are in and around the mouth.

== Function ==
Buccal cirri function as a food processing organ that is used to prevent larger particles from entering the oral hood. Buccal cirri perform this function alongside velar tentacles to create a comb like feeding appendage that sifts the particles that are entering via the water stream. This allows the smaller particles to continue through to the oral hood while the larger ones are brushed away. The buccal cirri surround the buccal cavity in a ring-like structure. They are thought to have chemoreceptors and mechanoreceptors that help detect food particles in the passing water stream.

== Organisms ==
Buccal cirri are found in organisms in the group called Amphioxus, which are commonly known as Lancelets. These organisms are in the kingdom Animalia, the phylum Chordata, the class Leptocardii, and the order Amphioxiformes. Lancelets are classified in the taxonomic group cephalochordates. There are thirty two different species of Lancelets in the order of Amphioxiformes. Lancelets feed through a process of filter feeding using buccal cirri, velar tentacles, velum, wheel organ, Hatschek's pit, and the tracts in the pharynx called the endostyle and epibranchial groove.
