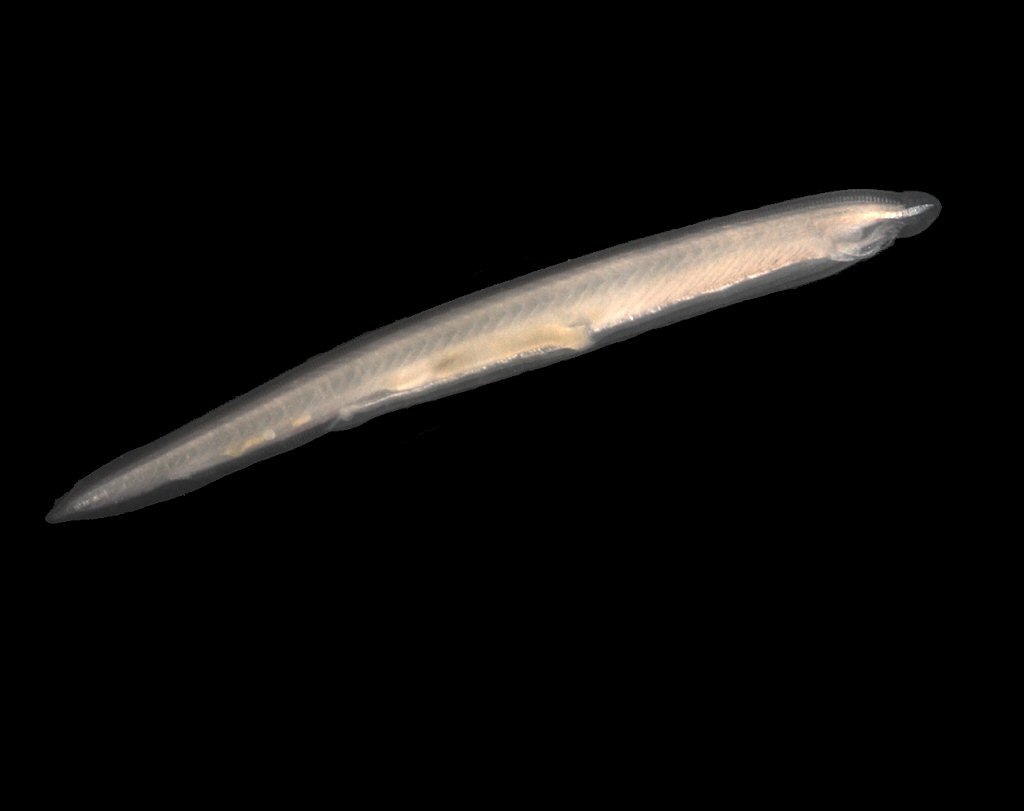
- Branchiostoma lanceolatum from Belgium

Scientific classification
- Kingdom: Animalia
- Phylum: Chordata
- Subphylum: Cephalochordata
- Class: Leptocardii
- Family: Branchiostomatidae
- Genus: Branchiostoma; Costa, 1834

Type species
- Branchiostoma lanceolatum (Pallas, 1774)

Diversity
- 24 species

Synonyms
- Amphioxus Yarrel, 1836; Limax Pallas 1774 non von Linné 1758 non Férussac 1819 non Martyn 1784; Dolichorhynchus Willey 1901 non Mulk & Jairajpuri 1974 non Hedge & Kit-Tan 1987

= Branchiostoma =

Genus of lancelets

Branchiostoma is one of the few living genera of lancelets (order Amphioxiformes). It is the type genus of family Branchiostomatidae.

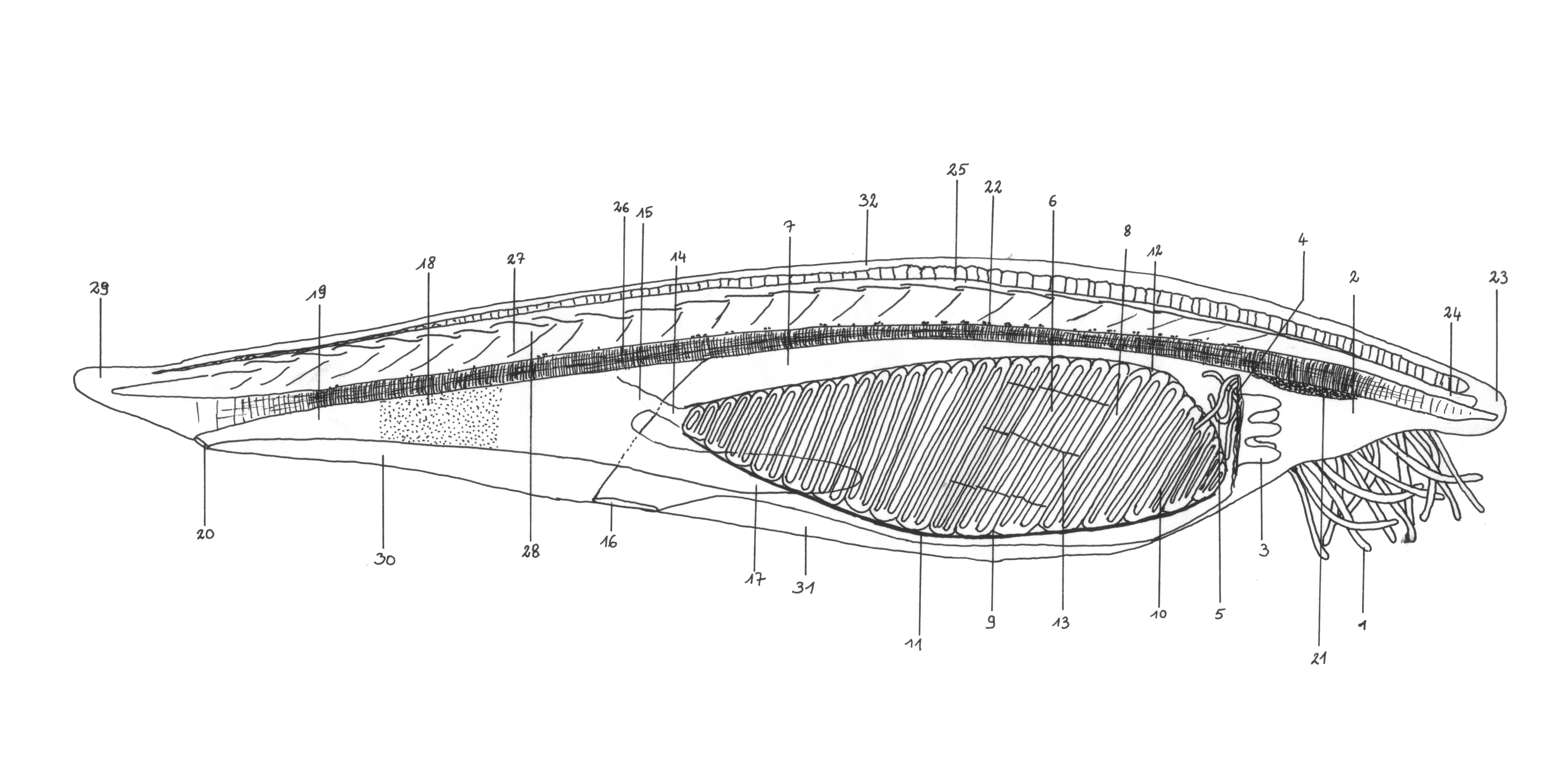
Anatomical diagram of B. lanceolatum (click for description)

These small vaguely eel- or snake-like animals are close relatives of vertebrates. The scientific name means "gill-mouth", referring to their anatomy – unlike vertebrates, they do not have a true head (with a skull capsule, eyes, nose, a well-developed brain etc.), but merely a mouth adjacent to the gill-slits, with the slightly enlarged anterior end of the dorsal nerve cord above and in front of them. It dislikes the light.

Branchiostoma grows to lengths of 50 to 60 millimeters in length.

Like all lancelets, they are filter feeders that hide in the sediment most of the time. The genus inhabits coastal waters throughout the world.

== Species ==
- Branchiostoma africae Hubbs 1927
- Branchiostoma arabiae Webb 1957
- Branchiostoma bazarutense Gilchrist 1923
- Branchiostoma belcheri (Gray 1847) (Belcher's lancelet)
- Branchiostoma bennetti Boschung & Gunter 1966 (Mud lancelet)
- Branchiostoma bermudae Hubbs 1922
- Branchiostoma californiense Andrews 1893 (Californian lancelet)
- Branchiostoma capense Gilchrist 1902
- Branchiostoma caribaeum Sundevall 1853 (Caribbean lancelet)
- Branchiostoma elongatum Sundevall 1852
- Branchiostoma floridae Hubbs 1922 (Florida lancelet)
- Branchiostoma gambiense Webb 1958
- Branchiostoma indicum (Willey 1901)
- Branchiostoma japonicum (Willey 1897) (Pacific lancelet)
- Branchiostoma lanceolatum (Pallas 1774) (European lancelet)
- Branchiostoma leonense Webb 1956
- Branchiostoma longirostrum Boschung 1983 (Shellhash lancelet)
- Branchiostoma malayanum Webb 1956
- Branchiostoma moretonense Kelly 1966; nomen dubium
- Branchiostoma nigeriense Webb 1955
- Branchiostoma platae Hubbs 1922
- Branchiostoma senegalense Webb 1955
- Branchiostoma tattersalli Hubbs 1922
- Branchiostoma virginiae Hubbs 1922 (Virginian lancelet)
