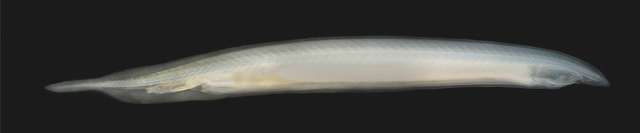
- Asymmetron lucayanum

Scientific classification
- Kingdom: Animalia
- Phylum: Chordata
- Subphylum: Cephalochordata
- Class: Leptocardii
- Family: Branchiostomatidae
- Genus: Asymmetron; Andrews, 1893

Species
- Asymmetron inferum; Asymmetron lucayanum

= Asymmetron =

Genus of lancelets

Asymmetron is one of the few living genera of lancelets (order Amphioxiformes).

Asymmetron can grow to 60 mm. The species of this genus are found in world oceans.

The genus Asymmetron currently contains only two species:

- Asymmetron inferum Nishikawa, 2004
- Asymmetron lucayanum Andrews, 1893
