= Endostyle =

Organ found in some chordates

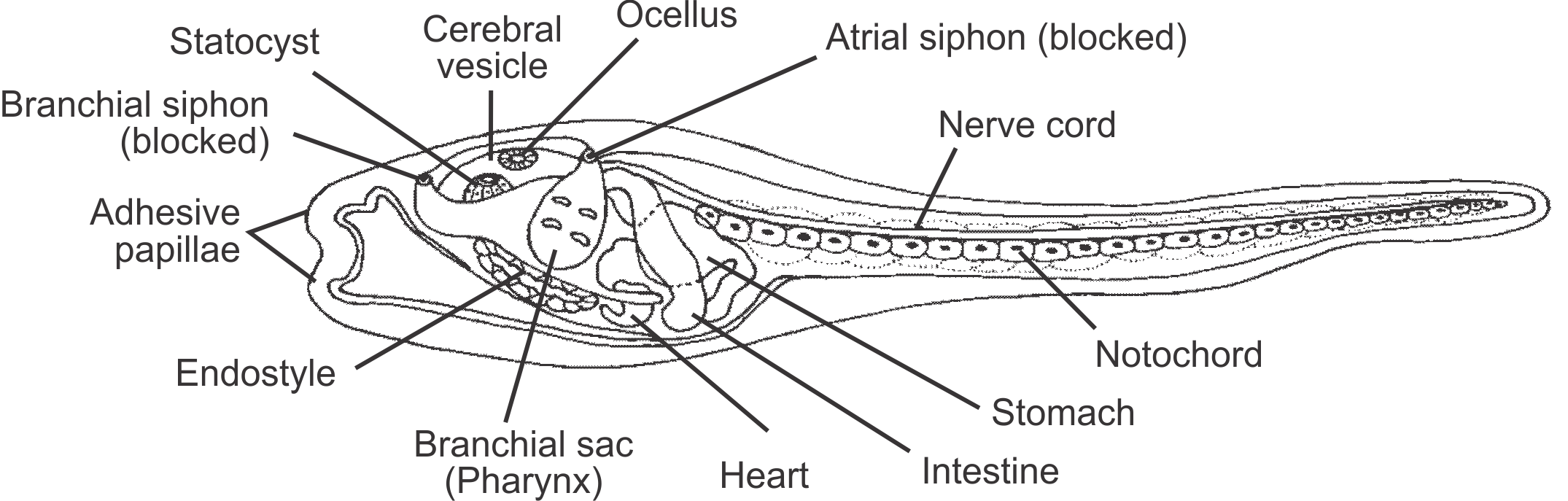
Anatomy of a larval tunicate showing the placement of the endostyle

The endostyle is an organ found in invertebrate chordate species of tunicates and lancelets, and in the larval stage of vertebrate lampreys. It assists in filter-feeding. It has evolved into the thyroid in vertebrate chordates.

Since the endostyle is found in all three chordate lineages, it is presumed to have arisen in the common ancestor of these taxa, along with a shift to internal feeding for extracting suspended food particles from the water. When feeding, food particles suspended in the water adhere to the mucus the endostyle produces. The filtered water is then expelled through the gill slits, while the food and mucus are swept into the esophagus by movements of the cilia that coat the endostyle.

The endostyle of larval lampreys (ammocoetes) metamorphoses into the thyroid gland in adults, and is regarded as being homologous to the thyroid in other vertebrates due to its iodine-concentrating activity.

One early hypothesis for the function of the endostyle, developed in 1873 by Muller, proposed that the ammocoete endostyle has extremely similar functions as the tunicate hypobranchial groove. Numerous investigations into the endostyle ensued, only for the theory to be denied by future researchers. However, during this research, it was found that ammocoete endostyles can accumulate radioactive iodine isotopes. This revived academic interest in the endostyle. Already in 1963, research had concluded that cephalochordate and tunicate endostyles have the ability to capture iodine, thus further perpetuating new research. A half century later, the homology between the thyroid in vertebrates and the endostyle in amphioxi and ascidian larvae was further supported by showing that their development involved fairly homologous transcription factors. Similar genetic studies on a hemichordate tentatively indicate that the endostyle also might share an origin with the stomochord.

== Zones of the endostyle ==
The endostyle can be recognized in transverse section by a multitude of differing zones. Zone 1 resides in the bottom portion of the endostyle, in which is easily recognizable by tall cilia and droplets of acid mucopolysaccharides. Investigations into Zone 1 have concluded that the cells contain glycogen, however, do not include mucins.

Zone 2 is classified with ventral glandular tracts. The cells identified in Zone 2 contain an acid mucous material. When using Hale's dialysed iron method, Zone 2 of the endostyle is the darkest definitive region. Zone 2 contains streaky and prominent pyroninophilia from the apical pole to the nuclei on the cell surface.

Zone 3 is classified by narrow ciliated bands nestled between glandular zones. Zone 3 contains a granulated apical border.

Zone 4 has a positively reacting granulation noticeably rougher than previous zones. The cytoplasm in Zone 4 contains large amounts of pyroninophilic material. This is similar to the consistency and appearance of the ventral glandular tracts. Zone 4 is nearly the same as the dorsal glandular tract.

Zone 5 has extremely large and abnormal amounts of granulated material at cell surfaces. This makes Zone 5 identifiable, while also drawing a comparison to the lateral edge of Zone 1. The cytoplasm of this zone contains PA/S-positive droplets which were neutralized with diastase. The surface material did not neutralize and digest PA/S-positive droplets. Does not contain pyroninophilia.

Zone 6 forms the lateral edge of the endostyle groove and is very distinct from the bands of previous zones, after undergoing the paraldehyde fuchsin procedure, small cytoplasmic granulation is seen.

Zone 7 is of particular interest because of the ability of this zone to trap radioactive iodine, which is a primary function of the thyroid. Granules of a variety of sizes exist in this zone. Thus, the granules can contribute to a variety of different functions. There is no evidence of secretory activity within this zone.

Zone 8 contains an enormous number of cilia. Zone 8 exists on the lateral edge of the endostyle groove. There has been no definitive proof of secretory ability within this zone, despite the existence of an acidic mucosal material that accumulates on the surface of the cells.

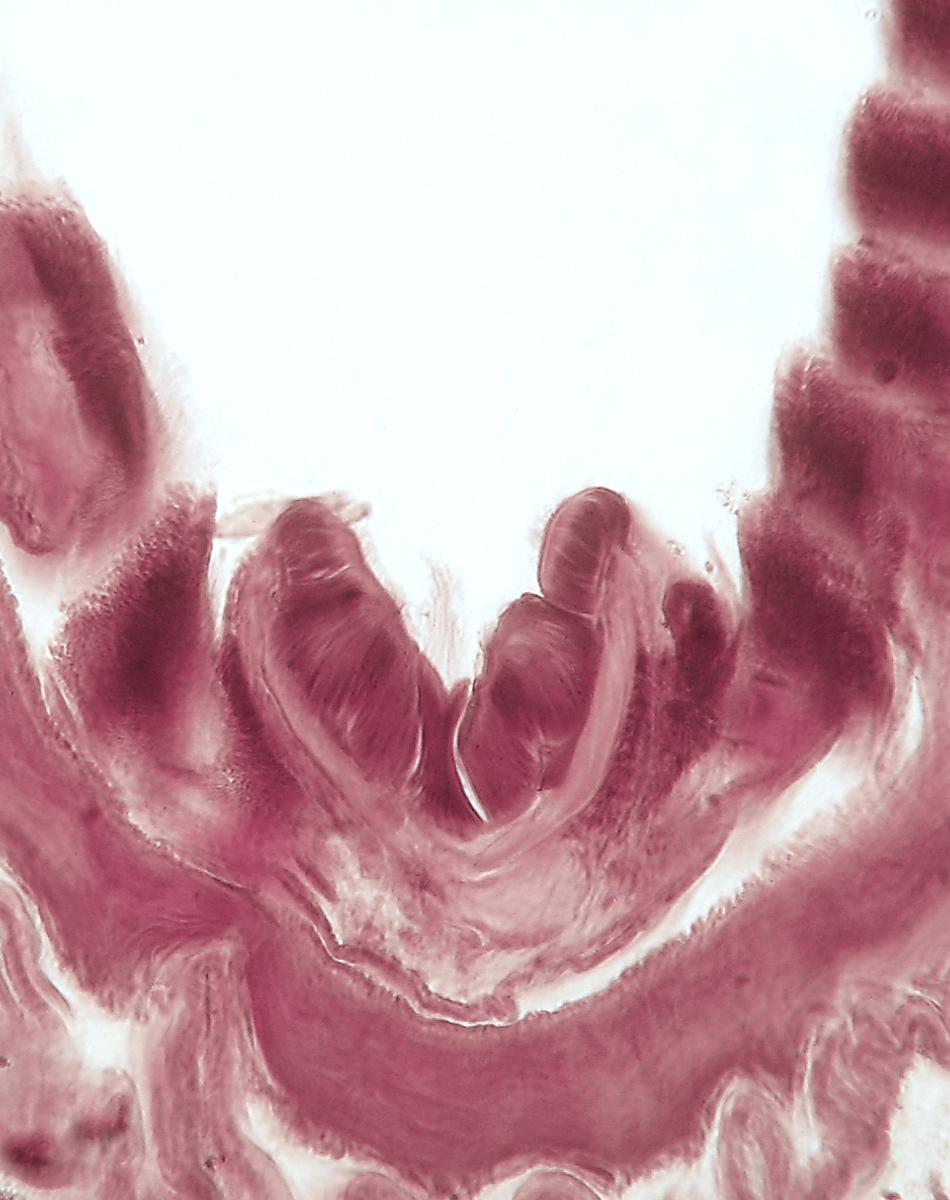
Microscopic view of the endostyle

Zone 11 has the lateral granulations of the endostyle. The band of cells in Zone 11 mimic but are vastly different from Zone 1 cells. Zone 11 cells more closely resemble the characteristics and makeup of Zone 2. There are no cilia in Zone 11 and the cells have a unique cytoplasm.

== Cellular makeup ==
Type 1 cells make up the cells of the gland cylinders. Type 1 cells in the endostyle contain enlarged, circular nuclei and a large nucleolus. They reside on the inner area of gland cylinders. There are noticeable functional and structural differences between dorsal and ventral cylinders. Ventral cylinders show a stronger cyanophile reaction, while dorsal cylinders give a weak PA/S-positive reaction.

Dorsal cylinder cells are identified by irregular strands between nuclei and the middle of the gland cylinder. Dorsal cylinder cells are basophile, as well as pyroninophile.

Ventral cylinder cells are in contrast to dorsal cylinder cells and are less characterized by basophile strands and are never phyroninophile.

Cylinder opening cells are identified as type 2 cells. Type 2 cells are subdivided in the endostyle into 2a, 2b, and 2c regions. There are no histochemical reactions regarding type 2a and 2b cells in recent studies.

2c cells, are richly granulated and very easily recognizable. It is also characterized by the pyroninophile zone close to the nucleus at the basal pole.

The gland cells of the endostyle handles all secretory activity. Because of the large number of ribonucleoproteins in the gland cells, the synthesis of protein and a protein material rich in -SS and -SH bridges. It is also releases disease-resistant carbohydrates.

The two zones in which secretory activity occurs include Zone 2 and 4. Materials for secretion is accumulated in Zone 1 and 2. Secretion accumulation and secretion may also accumulate in Zone 5.

Zones 1, 3, and 6 do not directly contribute to secretion, but contain ciliated cells.

The secretory regions in which the endostyle are known for include the ventral glandular region and the dorsal glandular region. The ventral glandular region secretes a protein and mucopolysaccharide combination mixed with either mucoproteins or glycoproteins. The dorsal glandular region is rich in either cystin, cysteine, or lipid solutions. Neither of the above glandular regions are involved in iodine metabolism. Throughout a multitude of studies, it has been believed that the ventral and dorsal gland cylinders do not form follicles of lamprey thyroid. Thus, the products derived from the endostyle's glandular region are associated with the traditional function of food collection through the secretory mucus. Future research is needed to determine if the material in the mucosal substance has any metabolic purpose more than trapping food.

The ability of the endostyle to trap radioiodine has a linear path to becoming the thyroid. Previous research has concluded the presence of an iodination center in some Zone 5 cells, which contain a multitude of substances. Contradictory to that study, other studies have instead pointed toward Zone 7 as the iodination center, whereas other studies have leaned toward the iodine center in Zone 8. The reason for the multitude of studies garnering different results could be the trapping of iodine in the more ciliated zones, instead of the trapping and breakdown of iodine materials. The presence of iodine collection and breakdown promoted the function of the endostyle as a precursor to the thyroid.
