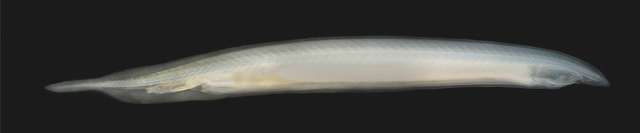

Scientific classification
- Kingdom: Animalia
- Phylum: Chordata
- Subphylum: Cephalochordata
- Class: Leptocardii
- Family: Branchiostomatidae
- Genus: Asymmetron
- Species: A. lucayanum

Binomial name
- Asymmetron lucayanum Andrews, 1893

= Asymmetron lucayanum =

Species of lancelets

Asymmetron lucayanum is a species of lancelet that is native to the Atlantic and Indo-west pacific oceans.

== Distribution ==
It is a benthic species lives in the tropical and subtropical shallow waters of the Atlantic oceans and the Indo-west pacific. They occur at a depth range of 11-915 meters.

Their environment contains sediments that have a high percentage of sand and granule, with low moisture and organic matter content.

The Asymmetron lucayanum is known to have gonads only on the right side of the body.
