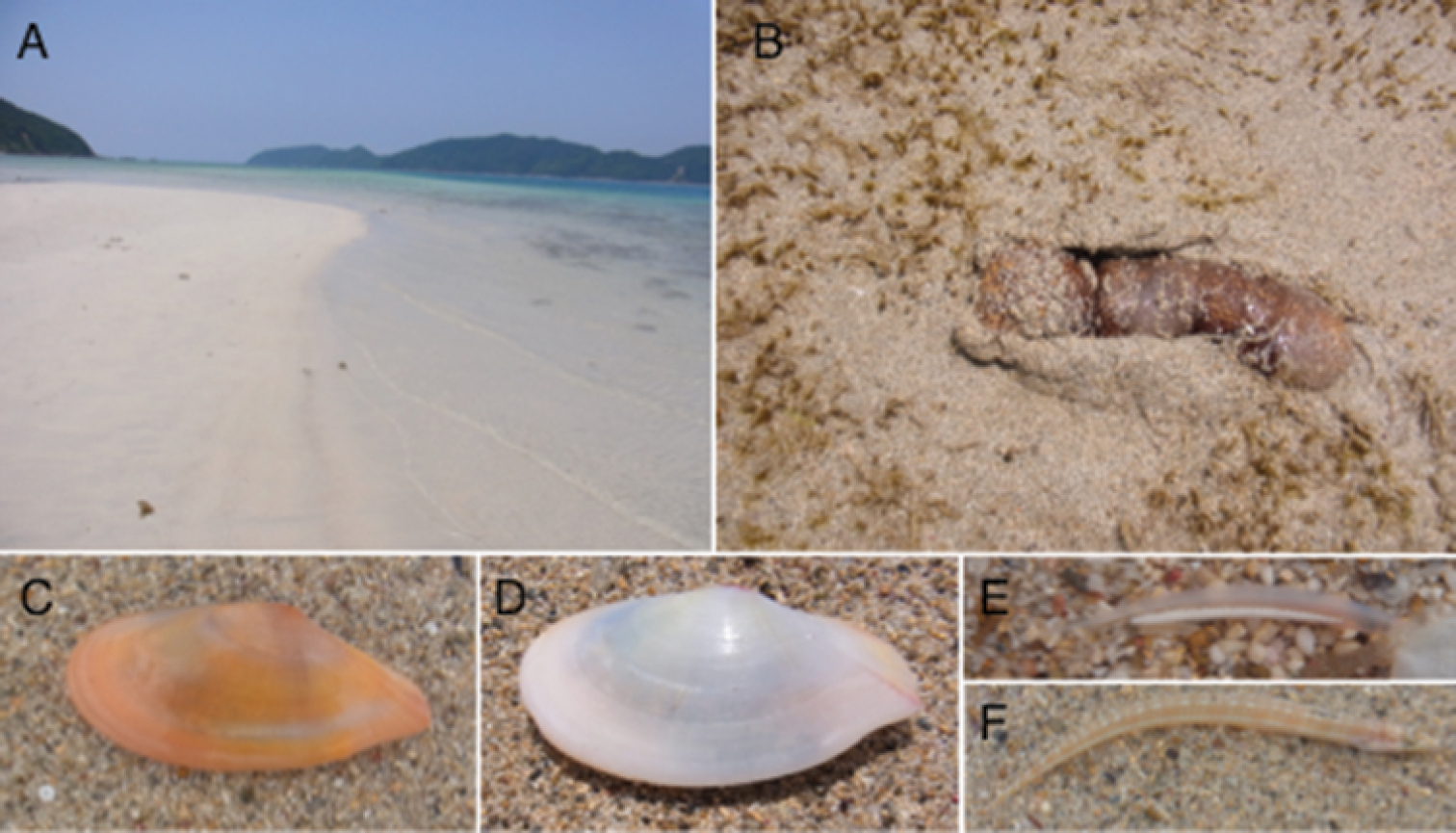
- Branchiostoma belcheri at Fig E

Scientific classification
- Kingdom: Animalia
- Phylum: Chordata
- Subphylum: Cephalochordata
- Class: Leptocardii
- Family: Branchiostomatidae
- Genus: Branchiostoma
- Species: B. belcheri

Binomial name
- Branchiostoma belcheri (Gray, 1847)

= Branchiostoma belcheri =

Species of lancelet

Branchiostoma belcheri, also known as the Belcher's lancelet, is a species of lancelet from the genus Branchiostoma. B. belcheri have a notochord, dorsal nerve cord, pharynx, buccal cavity, cirri, tail, dorsal fin, nerve cord, segmented muscle, and ocelli. They are distinguishable by a slightly round dorsal fin, eighty slender preanal fin-chambers, narrow caudal fin, and obtuse angles between fins. They obtain food by filter feeding.

The species was first reported in 1897 near the Amakusa Islands, specifically off Goshonoura Island, south of Amakusa-Kamishima Island. In addition to the location of the siting, information regarding reproductive period and morphology was also obtained.

Branchiostoma belcheri are gonochoric, reproducing via external fertilization.

Branchiostoma belcheri are an endangered species, threatened by the influx of pollutants of land-based origin into the sea such as cleaning agents, chemical waste, garbage, mining waste, pesticides, petroleum products, and sewage.

== Anatomy and morphology ==
Branchiostoma belcheri exhibit all basic characteristics of the Chordata phylum including the notochord, dorsal nerve cord, pharynx, buccal cavity, cirri, tail, dorsal fin, nerve cord, segmented muscle, and ocelli. Starting with the internal structure, said organisms have true coeloms where the critical organs develop. The notochord runs down the animal's back with a smooth layer of connective tissue on the exterior, lining an interior core of cells that are loosely packed and contain fluid-filled spaces. The outer sheath resists changes in fluid pressure in the notochord, allowing for flexibility while simultaneously withstanding contraction. In this way the notochord can be characterized as a hydrostatic organ. During muscle contraction, the notochord also plays an important role in withstanding shortening of the body. The dorsal nerve cord is located behind the notochord. The pharynx is another structure made from cartilage for feeding, found near the throat. It is composed of pharyngeal slits that are located between pharyngeal bars which are necessary for feeding.

As for the external structure, the tail extends from the body, following the end of the digestive tract. This is a distinguishing characteristic from other worm types as the anus is located all the way at the bottom, on the back side of animal. The dorsal fin is located on the back side of the animal and is made rigid by cartilage. The nerve cord is found in a similar region and originates as a hollow tube. Within the nerve cord are small clusters of light-sensitive cells called ocelli. Finally, muscle allows for movement and maintenance of bodily position, which can be found in discrete segments along the sides of the body.

Aside from the internal and external structures of B. belcheri, it is worth noting their movement. While typically sedentary, B. belcheri has swimming capabilities, moving in the upward direction. This is done via contractions that originate from the anterior end and move down longitudinal muscle one myotome at a time. Contractions alternate between the left and right side of the body, prompting side-to-side twisting that pushes the body forward and allows for spiral swimming about its axis. In addition to these structures are those which produce eggs or sperm, also known as the gonads as well as organs homologous to those of vertebrates such as the pronephric kidney or an endostyle (ciliated, grooved organ that aids in filter feeding via production of mucoproteins). It can be seen that B. belcheri exhibit a genome similar to that of vertebrates, however it is simpler as their genomes did not undergo entire duplications as did that of vertebrate lineages.

Branchiostoma belcheri have three major morphological characteristics that distinguish them from other Branchiostoma. Firstly, they are identifiable by their slightly round dorsal fin that has an obtuse end. Secondly, B. belcheri consist of more than eighty slender preanal fin-chambers. Thirdly, B. belcheri have a narrow caudal fin, as well as an obtuse angle between the dorsal and super-caudal fins, likewise between the prenatal and sub-caudal fins.

== Behavior ==
Branchiostoma belcheri are gonochoric, reproducing via external fertilization. B. belcheri eggs initially develop into planktotrophic larva, later maturing to benthic adults. They reproduce during the spawning season, which takes place every year for approximately three to six month, and occurs during the spring and summer. Males and females release gametes in the water column. The gametes undergo development such that they exhibit ten distinct periods: zygote, cleavage, blastula, gastrula, neurula, talibud, larva, metamorphosis, juvenile, and adult. Those starting from zygote and ending with metamorphosis are identified as planktonic periods, while the juvenile and adult periods are benthic and live buried into the substrate.

Evolution begins with the embryonic period, followed by a larval period, ceasing with the process of metamorphosis, which lasts anywhere from a few weeks to several months post-fertilization. Post-metamorphic juveniles closely resemble adults, differing only in the fact that juveniles require growth prior to gonad formation. This growth period varies in duration depending on the species, ranging from a few weeks in those characterized as "tropical" to several years for those identified as "temperate". Once gonads evolve, the organisms become sexually mature adults.

== Feeding ==
Branchiostoma belcheri reside in the ocean, specially digging its tail into the sand. They use their mouths to suck in large amounts of water, forcing it out via the slits and holding onto small food particles in the process. The space inside the mouth is known as the buccal cavity, while the outside of the mouth is surrounded by small tentacles called cirri. The mouth, buccal cavity, and cirri are all part of the digestive tract, as is the hepatic cecum which, in tandem with the intestine, functions to secrete digestive juices as well as aid in nutrient absorption. B. belcheri depend on the process of filter feeding to obtain nutrients. Thus, they feed on microorganisms existing in the water taken up by ciliary action during respiration and brought into the pharyngeal cavity. The cilia take in the water, and also act to isolate the food particles.

== Distribution and habitat ==
Present distribution of B. belcheri is in the southern Ariake Sea. Early reports mark them near the Amakusa Islands. Later, they were found on the opposite side of the Amakusa-Kamishima Island in the Ariake Sea. Another occurrence was reported in later accounts, placing the species in the northern Ariake Sea. Once again, the species were observed in another distinct area; on the southern coast of Saga Prefecture. Later observations concluded that amphioxus in waters other than the Ariake Sea and the Amakusa belonged to B. belcheri var. tsingtauense, while those in those regions were an intermediate form between this type and B. belcheri. Amphioxus distribution shows large population numbers in the central portion of Ariake sea, as well as four locations surrounding the Amakusa Islands. They mostly live in sand shores as well as dilute sea waters (15.4% to 33.1% salinities).

As of 1998, Japan Fisheries Resource Conservation Association labeled B. belcheri endangered, listing the species in "Endangered Animals of Japanese Marine and Fresh Water Organisms". Populations have been threatened by the influx of pollutants of land-based origin into the sea such as cleaning agents, chemical waste, garbage, mining waste, pesticides, petroleum products, and sewage. Additionally, aquacultural expansion, illegal fishing, sand mining and sediment transportation, and increasing maritime traffic all contribute to the elimination of amphioxus, as well as destruction of their habitat.

== Taxonomy ==
The occurrence of the amphioxus in the Ariake Sea was reported upon discovery of a small animal, similar to that of a fish, that was referred to as "itachi-uo" by the locals. Further investigation involved obtaining samples from Saga Prefecture. These were originally named "Aratsu" or "Gnadotsu", but were later added to B. belcheri.

Branchiostoma belcheri is related to other species of Branchiostoma as it is marine, distributed in shallow waters, positioned with its anterior end in the sand, mostly sedentary, has a small, slender body, is segmented and transparent, has a trunk, tail, median fins, myotomes, notochord, complete digestive tract, and dorsal nerve cord, is enterocoelous, respirates across body surface, uses protonephridia with solenocytes for excretion, performs external fertilization, has separate sexes and exhibits indirect development.

Branchiostoma belcheri differ in number of genetic mutations. Mutations in at least one of the sequenced samples are present in twelve percent of genomic sites of the B. belcheri total genome. Approximately thirteen million variations were identified in each B. belcheri genome. Studies show that the ratio of number of transition to transversions for a pair of sequences was very low, suggesting a majority of mutations are recent with high mutation per generation. This data, along with high polymorphism rates, confirms the large-scale genetic diversity exhibited by B. belcheri. In this same study, over six-hundred variations were identified in the B. belcheri mitochondrial genome. Additionally, mutations in genes associated with phagocytic intracellular digestion likely influence the ability of organisms to phagocytize and digest food particles.
