= Stomochord =

Flexible, hollow tube found in hemichordates

The stomochord is a flexible, hollow tube found in hemichordates. Stomochords arise in embryonic development as an outpocketing from the roof of the embryonic gut anterior to the pharynx. In adults, they extend dorsally from the pharynx into the proboscis, and it communicates with the oral cavity. Their walls are composed primarily of epithelial cells, including ciliated and glandular cells.

== Relationship to chordate anatomy ==
Stomochords were initially considered a variant of a primitive notochord, a defining feature of chordates. However, they are now recognized to not share histological composition to that of the notochord found in chordates, lacking the fibrous sheath characteristic of a notochord. Also, it is derived from they endoderm while the notochord is derived from the mesoderm.

In addition, gene expression studies have failed to provide any evidence for homology between the notochord and the stomochord, or between the notochord and any hemichordate structure. The Brachyury (T) gene, which is expressed in ascidian and other chordate notochords, is not expressed in the stomochord, and collagen is absent.
