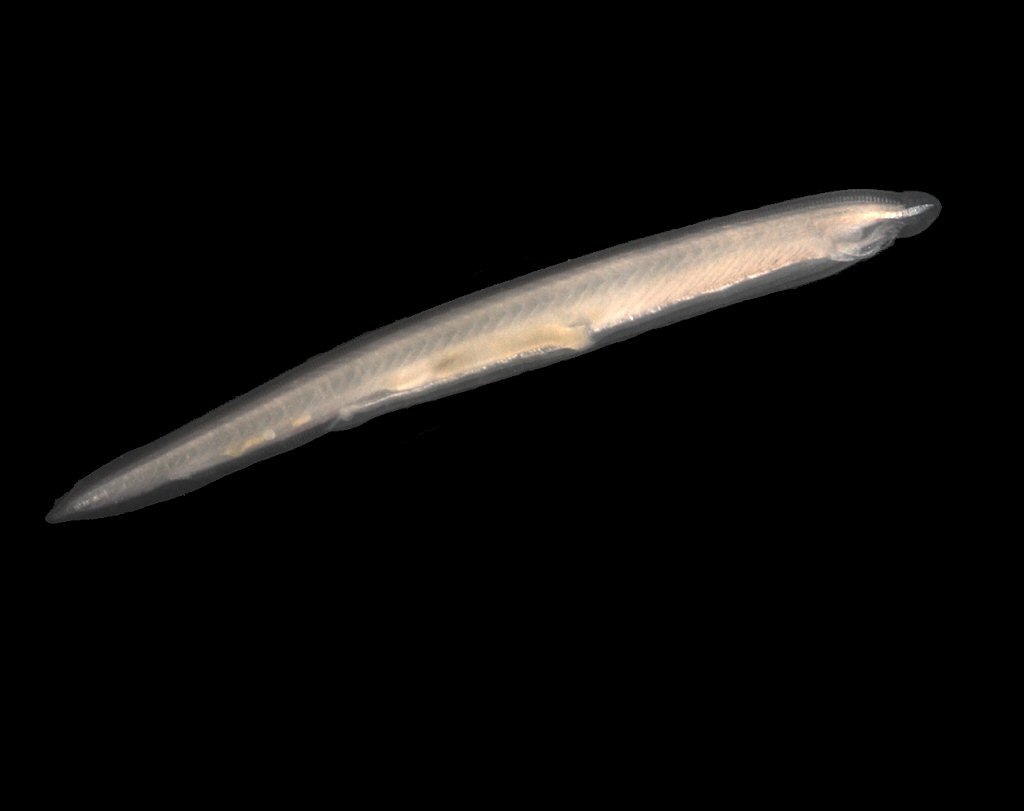
- Branchiostoma lanceolatum

Scientific classification
- Kingdom: Animalia
- Phylum: Chordata
- Subphylum: Cephalochordata; Haeckel, 1866
- Class: Leptocardii; Müller, 1845

Genera
- †Cathaymyrus?; †Palaeobranchiostoma?; Branchiostomatidae Bonaparte, 1846; Asymmetron; Branchiostoma; Epigonichthys

Synonyms
- Subphylum or class: Acrania Haeckel, 1866; Order: Amphioxi Bonaparte, 1846; Amphioxiformes Berg, 1937; Branchiostomiformes Fowler, 1947; Family: Amphioxidae Gray, 1842; Asymmetrontidae Whitley, 1932; Epigonichthyidae Hubbs, 1922

= Lancelet =

Cephalochordata (Lancelets) Temporal range: Recent Possible Cambrian and Permian records

Subphylum of chordates

The lancelets (/ˈlænslɪt, ˈlɑːn-/ LA(H)N-slit), also known as amphioxi (sing.: amphioxus /ˌæmfiˈɒksəs/ AM-fee-OK-səs), consist of 32 described species of somewhat fish-like benthic filter-feeding chordates in the subphylum Cephalochordata, class Leptocardii, and family Branchiostomatidae.

Lancelets diverged from other chordates during or prior to the Cambrian period. A number of fossil chordates have been suggested to be closely related to lancelets, including Pikaia and Cathaymyrus from the Cambrian and Palaeobranchiostoma from the Permian, but their close relationship to lancelets has been doubted by other authors. Molecular clock analysis suggests that modern lancelets probably diversified much more recently, during the Cretaceous or Cenozoic.

They are of interest to zoologists as lancelets contain many organs and organ systems that are homologous to those of modern fish. Therefore, they provide a number of examples of possible evolutionary exaptation. For example, the gill-slits of lancelets are used for feeding only, and not for respiration. The circulatory system carries food throughout their body, but does not have red blood cells or hemoglobin for transporting oxygen.

Comparing the genomes of lancelets and vertebrates and their differences in gene expression, function, and number can shed light on the origins of vertebrates and their evolution. The genome of a few species in the genus Branchiostoma have been sequenced: B. floridae, B. belcheri, and B. lanceolatum.

In Asia, lancelets are harvested commercially as food for humans. In Japan, the amphioxus (B. belcheri) has been listed in the registry of "Endangered Animals of Japanese Marine and Fresh Water Organisms".

== History ==
The first representative organism of the group to be described was Branchiostoma lanceolatum. It was described by Peter Simon Pallas in 1774 as a molluscan slug in the genus Limax. It was not until 1834 that Oronzio Gabriele Costa brought the phylogenetic position of the group closer to the agnathan vertebrates (hagfish and lampreys), including it in the new genus Branchiostoma (from the Greek, branchio- = "gills", -stoma = "mouth"). In 1836, William Yarrell renamed the genus as Amphioxus (from the Greek: "pointed on both sides"), now considered an obsolete synonym of the genus Branchiostoma. The term "amphioxus" is still used as a common name along with "lancelet", especially in the English language. All extant lancelets are all placed in the family Branchiostomatidae, class Leptocardii, and subphylum Cephalochordata.

Observations of amphioxus anatomy began in the middle of the 19th century. Alexander Kovalevsky first described the key anatomical features of the adult amphioxus (hollow dorsal nerve tube, endostyle, segmented body, post-anal tail). Armand De Quatrefages first completely described the nervous system of amphioxus.

Kovalevsky also released the first complete description of amphioxus embryos, while Max Schultze was the first to describe the larvae.

== Anatomy ==
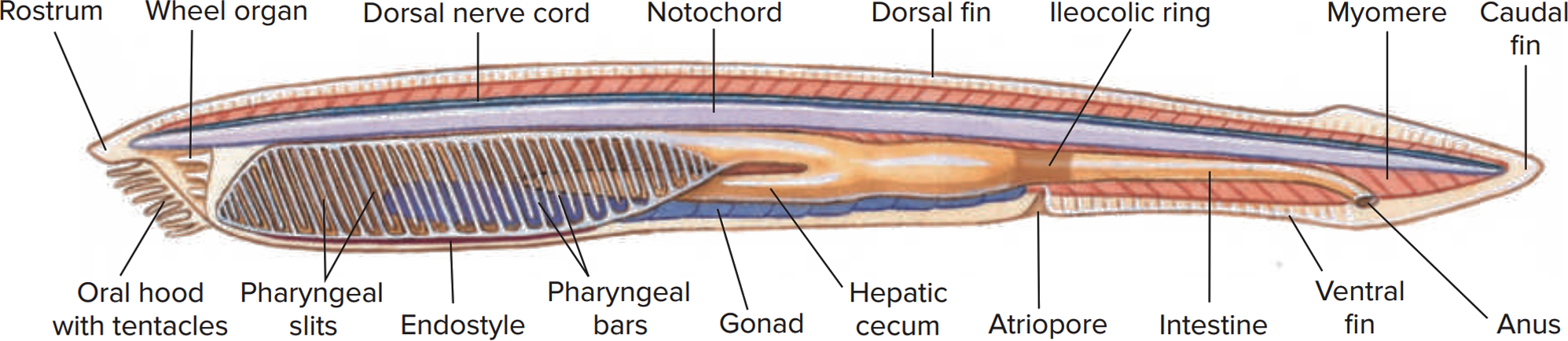
Anatomy of the lancelet

The larvae are extremely asymmetrical, with the mouth and anus on the left side, and the gill slits on the right side. Organs associated with the pharynx are positioned either exclusively on the left or on the right side of the body. In addition, segmented muscle blocks and parts of the nervous system are asymmetrical. After metamorphosis the anatomy becomes more symmetrical, but some asymmetrical traits are still present also as adults, such as the nervous system and the location of the gonads which are found on the right side in the genera Asymmetron and Epigonichthys (in Branchiostoma, gonads develop on both sides of body).

Depending on the exact species involved, the maximum length of lancelets is typically 2.5 to 8 cm (1.0–3.1 in). Branchiostoma belcheri and B. lanceolatum are among the largest. Except for the size, the species are very similar in general appearance, differing mainly in the number of myotomes and the pigmentation of their larvae. They have a translucent, somewhat fish-like body, but without any paired fins or other limbs. A relatively poorly developed tail fin is present, so they are not especially good swimmers. While they do possess some cartilage material stiffening the gill slits, mouth, and tail, they have no true complex skeleton.

=== Nervous system and notochord ===
In common with vertebrates, lancelets have a hollow nerve cord running along the back, pharyngeal slits and a tail that runs past the anus. Also like vertebrates, the muscles are arranged in blocks called myomeres.

Unlike vertebrates, the dorsal nerve cord is not protected by bone but by a simpler notochord made up of a cylinder of cells that are closely packed in collagen fibers to form a toughened rod. The lancelet notochord, unlike the vertebrate spine, extends into the head. This gives the subphylum Cephalochordata its name (κεφαλή, kephalē means 'head'). The fine structure of the notochord and the cellular basis of its adult growth are best known for the Bahamas lancelet, Asymmetron lucayanum

The nerve cord is only slightly larger in the head region than in the rest of the body, so that lancelets do not appear to possess a true brain. However, developmental gene expression and transmission electron microscopy indicate the presence of a diencephalic forebrain, a possible midbrain, and a hindbrain. Recent studies involving a comparison with vertebrates indicate that the vertebrate thalamus, pretectum, and midbrain areas jointly correspond to a single, combined region in the amphioxus, which has been termed di-mesencephalic primordium (DiMes).

=== Visual system ===
Lancelets have four known kinds of light-sensing structures: Three are respectively called Joseph cells, Hesse organs and lamellar body. The fourth is an unpaired anterior eye. All of them utilize opsins as light receptors. All of these organs and structures are located in the neural tube, with the frontal eye at the front, followed by the lamellar body, the Joseph cells, and the Hesse organs.

==== Joseph cells and Hesse organs ====
Joseph cells are bare photoreceptors surrounded by a band of microvilli. These cells bear the opsin melanopsin. The Hesse organs (also known as dorsal ocelli) consist of a photoreceptor cell surrounded by a band of microvilli and bearing melanopsin, but half enveloped by a cup-shaped pigment cell. The peak sensitivity of both cells is ~470 nm (blue).

Both the Joseph cells and Hesse organs are in the neural tube, the Joseph cells forming a dorsal column, the Hesse organs in the ventral part along the length of the tube. The Joseph cells extend from the caudal end of the anterior vesicle (or cerebral vesicle) to the boundary between myomeres three and four, where the Hesse organs begin and continue nearly to the tail.

==== Frontal eye ====
The frontal eye consists of a pigment cup, a group of photoreceptor cells (termed Row 1), three rows of neurons (Rows 2–4), and glial cells. The frontal eye, which expresses the PAX6 gene, has been proposed as the homolog of either the paired eyes or the pineal eye on vertebrates, the pigment cup as the homolog of the RPE (retinal pigment epithelium), the putative photoreceptors as homologs of vertebrate rods and cones, and Row 2 neurons as homologs of the retinal ganglion cells. The pigment cup is oriented concave dorsally. Its cells contain the pigment melanin.

The putative photoreceptor cells, Row 1, are arranged in two diagonal rows, one on either side of the pigment cup, symmetrically positioned with respect to the ventral midline. The cells are flask-shaped, with long, slender ciliary processes (one cilium per cell). The main bodies of the cells lie outside of the pigment cup, while the cilia extend into the pigment cup before turning and exiting. The cells bear the opsin c-opsin 1, except for a few which carry c-opsin 3.

The Row 2 cells are serotonergic neurons in direct contact with Row 1 cells. Row 3 and 4 cells are also neurons. Cells of all four rows have axons that project into the left and right ventrolateral nerves. For Row 2 neurons, axon projections have been traced to the tegmental neuropil. The tegmental neuropil has been compared with locomotor control regions of the vertebrate hypothalamus, where paracrine release modulates locomotor patterns such as feeding and swimming.

=== Fluorescent proteins ===
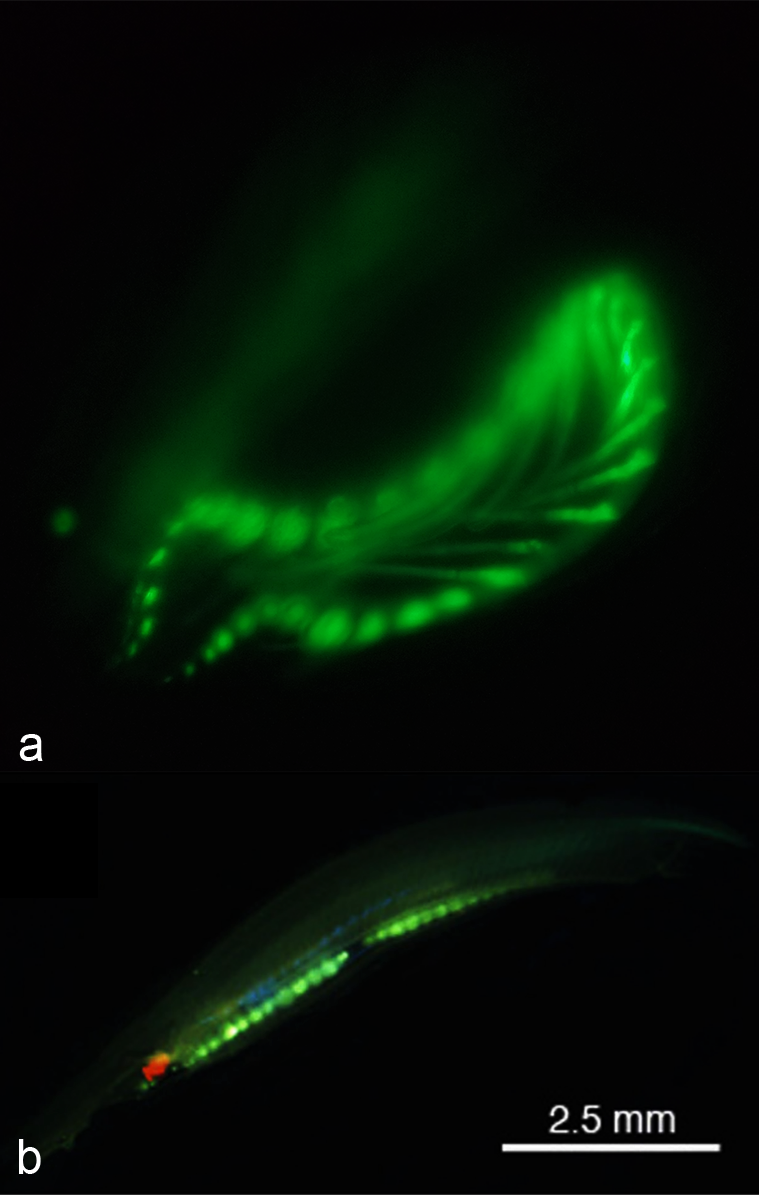
Green fluorescence in Lancelets. (a. Branchiostoma floridae GFP near the eye spot and in the oral tentacles.) (b. Asymmetron lucayanum green fluorescence in the gonads.)

Lancelets naturally express green fluorescent proteins (GFP) inside their oral tentacles and near the eye spot. Depending on the species, it can also be expressed in the tail and gonads, though this is only reported in the Asymmetron genus. Multiple fluorescent protein genes have been recorded in lancelet species throughout the world. Branchiostoma floridae alone has 16 GFP-encoding genes. However, the GFP produced by lancelets is more similar to GFP produced by copepods than jellyfish (Aequorea victoria).

It is suspected GFP plays multiple roles with lancelets such as attracting plankton towards their mouth. Considering that lancelets are filter feeders, the natural current would draw nearby plankton into the digestive tract. GFP is also expressed in larvae, signifying it may be used for photoprotection by converting higher energy blue light to less harmful green light.

Live lancelet (B. floridae) under a fluorescent microscope.

The fluorescent proteins from lancelets have been adapted for use in molecular biology and microscopy. The yellow fluorescent protein from Branchiostoma lanceolatum exhibits unusually high quantum yield (~0.95). It has been engineered into a monomeric green fluorescent protein known as mNeonGreen, which is the brightest known monomeric green or yellow fluorescent protein.

=== Feeding and digestive system ===
Lancelets are passive filter feeders, spending most of the time half-buried in sand with only their frontal part protruding. They eat a wide variety of small planktonic organisms, such as bacteria, fungi, diatoms, and zooplankton, and they will also take detritus. Little is known about the diet of the lancelet larvae in the wild, but captive larvae of several species can be maintained on a diet of phytoplankton, although this apparently is not optimal for Asymmetron lucayanum.

Lancelets have oral cirri, thin tentacle-like strands that hang in front of the mouth and act as sensory devices and as a filter for the water passing into the body. Water passes from the mouth into the large pharynx, which is lined by numerous gill-slits. The ventral surface of the pharynx contains a groove called the endostyle, which, connected to a structure known as Hatschek's pit, produces a film of mucus. Ciliary action pushes the mucus in a film over the surface of the gill slits, trapping suspended food particles as it does so. The mucus is collected in a second, dorsal groove, known as the epipharyngeal groove, and passed back to the rest of the digestive tract. Having passed through the gill slits, the water enters an atrium surrounding the pharynx, then exits the body via the atriopore.

Both adults and larvae exhibit a "cough" reflex to clear the mouth or throat of debris or items too large to swallow. In larvae the action is mediated by the pharyngeal muscles while in the adult animal it is accomplished by atrial contraction.

The remainder of the digestive system consists of a simple tube running from the pharynx to the anus. The hepatic caecum, a single blind-ending caecum, branches off from the underside of the gut, with a lining able to phagocytize the food particles, a feature not found in vertebrates. Although it performs many functions of a liver, it is not considered a true liver but a homolog of the vertebrate liver.

=== Other systems ===
Lancelets have no respiratory system, breathing solely through their skin, which consists of a simple epithelium. Despite the name, little if any respiration occurs in the "gill" slits, which are solely devoted to feeding. The circulatory system does resemble that of primitive fish in its general layout, but is much simpler, and does not include a heart. There are no blood cells, and no hemoglobin.

The excretory system consists of segmented "kidneys" containing protonephridia instead of nephrons, and quite unlike those of vertebrates. Also unlike vertebrates, there are numerous, segmented gonads.

== Ecology ==
=== Habitat ===
External videos
- Footage of a lancelet burrowing from Roscoff Biological Station

Adult amphioxi typically inhabit the seafloor, burrowing into well-ventilated substrates characterized by a soft texture and minimal organic content. While various species have been observed in different types of substrate, such as fine sand, coarse sand, and shell deposits, most exhibit a distinct preference for coarse sand with low levels of fine particles. For instance, Branchiostoma nigeriense along the west coast of Africa, Branchiostoma caribaeum in the Mississippi Sound and along the coast from South Carolina to Georgia, B. senegalense in the Atlantic Ocean on the shelf region off North West Africa, and B. lanceolatum along the Mediterranean coast of southern France all demonstrate this preference. Branchiostoma floridae from Tampa Bay, Florida, appears to be an exception to this trend, favoring fine sand bottoms instead.

=== Feeding ===
Their habitat preference reflects their feeding method: they only expose their front ends to the water and filter-feed on plankton by means of a branchial ciliary current that passes water through a mucous sheet. Branchiostoma floridae is capable of trapping particles from microbial to small phytoplankton size, while B. lanceolatum preferentially traps bigger particles (>4 μm).

=== Reproduction and spawning ===
Lancelets are gonochoric animals, i.e. having two sexes, and they reproduce via external fertilisation. They only reproduce during their spawning season, which varies slightly between species — usually corresponding to spring and summer months. All lancelets species spawn shortly after sunset, either synchronously (e.g. Branchiostoma floridae, about once every two weeks during spawning season) or asynchronously (Branchiostoma lanceolatum, gradual spawning through the season). Rare instances of hermaphroditism have been reported in Branchiostoma lanceolatum and B. belcheri, where a small number of female gonads were observed within male individuals, typically ranging from 2 to 5 gonads out of a total of 45–50.

Nicholas and Linda Holland were the first researchers to describe a method of obtaining amphioxus embryos by induction of spawning in captivity and in vitro fertilization. Spawning can be artificially induced in the lab by electric or thermal shock.

== Model organism ==
Lancelets became famous in the 1860s when Ernst Haeckel began promoting them as a model for the ancestor of all vertebrates. By 1900, lancelets had become a model organism. By the mid-20th century, they had fallen out of favor for a variety of reasons, including a decline in comparative anatomy and embryology, and due to the belief that lancelets were more derived than they appeared, e.g., the profound asymmetry in the larval stage. More recently, the fundamental symmetry and twisted development of vertebrates is the topic of the axial twist theory. According to this theory, there is a deep agreement between vertebrates and cephalochordates, and even all chordates.

With the advent of molecular genetics, lancelets are once again regarded as a model of vertebrate ancestors and are used again as a model organism.

As a result of their use in science, methods of keeping and breeding lancelets in captivity have been developed for several species, initially the European Branchiostoma lanceolatum, but later also the West Pacific Branchiostoma belcheri and Branchiostoma japonicum, the Gulf of Mexico and West Atlantic Branchiostoma floridae, and the circumtropical (however, genetic evidence suggests the Atlantic and Indo-Pacific populations should be recognized as separate) Asymmetron lucayanum. They can reach an age of up to 7–8 years.

== As human food ==
The animals are edible and harvested in some parts of the world. They are eaten both fresh, tasting like herring, and as a food additive in dry form after being roasted in oil. When their gonads start to ripen in the spring it affects their flavor, making them taste bad during their breeding season.

== Phylogeny and taxonomy ==
Phylogeny of Chordata after Mussini et al, 2024.

- Chordata (total group)
  - †Banffia
  - †Heteromorphus
  - - †Skeemella
    - - †Nesonektris
      - - †Vetulicolidae
        - - †Didazoon
          - †Pomatrum
          - †Yuyuanozoon
          - - †Yunnanozoon
            - - †Cathaymyrus
              - †Pikaia
              - Chordata (crown group)
                - Cephalochordata
                - - Tunicata
                  - - †Metaspriggina
                    - - †Myllokunmingia
                      - Vertebrata

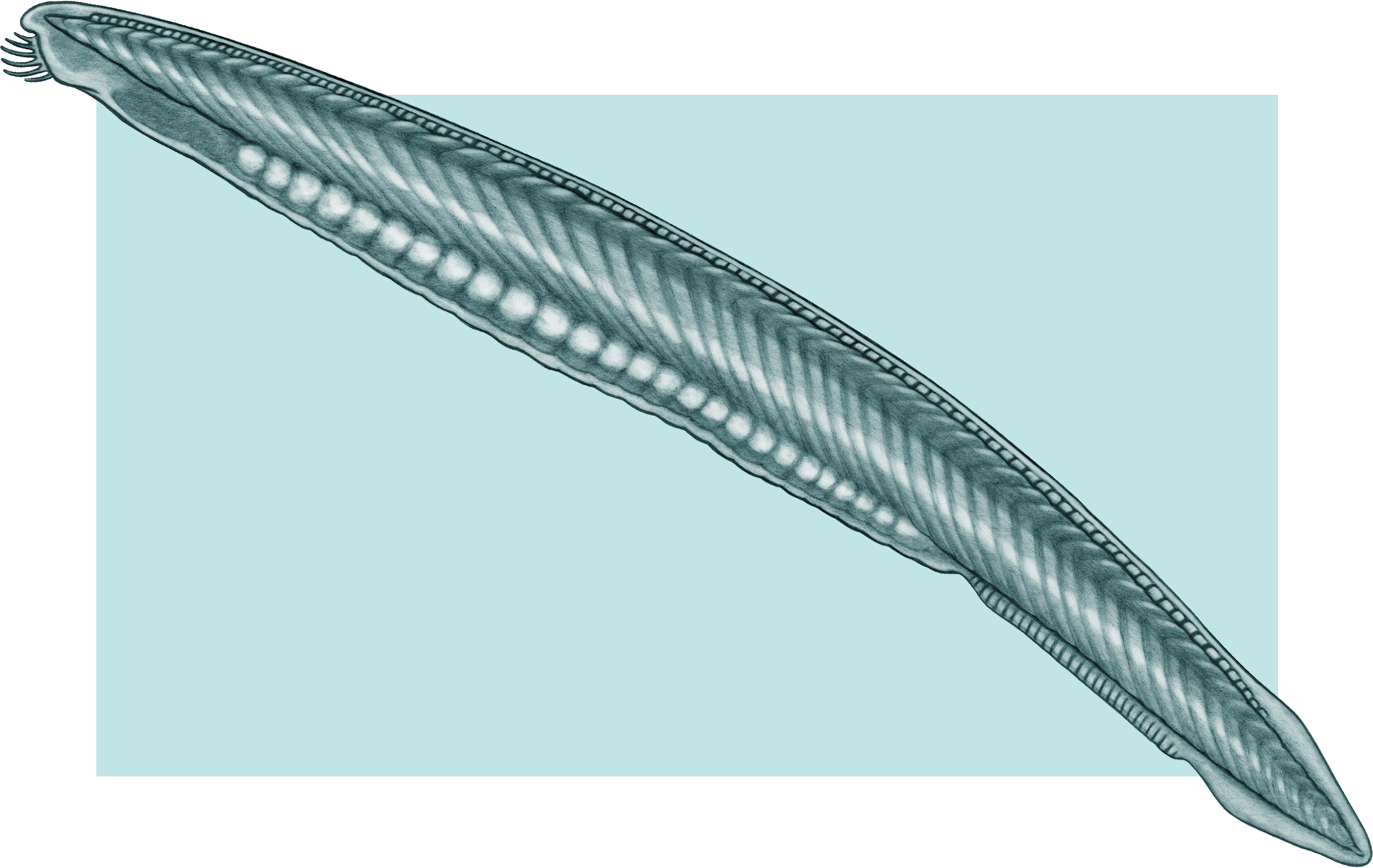
The lancelet is a small, translucent, fish-like animal that is one of the closest living invertebrate relatives of the vertebrates.

The lancelets were traditionally seen as the sister lineage to the vertebrates; in turn, these two groups together (sometimes called Notochordata) were considered the sister group to the Tunicata (also called Urochordata and including sea squirts). Consistent with this view, at least ten morphological features are shared by lancelets and vertebrates, but not tunicates. Newer research suggests this pattern of evolutionary relationship is incorrect. Extensive molecular phylogenetic analysis has shown convincingly that the Cephalochordata is the most basal subphylum of the chordates, with tunicates being the sister group of the vertebrates. This revised phylogeny of chordates suggests that tunicates have secondarily lost some of the morphological characters that were formerly considered to be synapomorphies (shared, derived characters) of vertebrates and lancelets. Lancelets have turned out to be among the most genetically diverse animals sequenced to date, due to high rates of genetic changes like exon shuffling and domain combination.

Among the three extant (living) genera, Asymmetron is basal. Molecular clock studies have come to different conclusions on their divergence, with some suggesting that Asymmetron diverged from other lancelets more than 100 million years ago while others have suggested that it occurred about 46 million years ago. According to the younger estimation, Branchiostoma and Epigonichthys have been estimated to have diverged from each other about 38.3 million years ago. Despite this deep separation, hybrids between Asymmetron lucayanum and Branchiostoma floridae are viable (among the deepest split species known to be able to produce such hybrids).

The following are the species recognised by WoRMS. Other sources recognize about thirty species. It is likely that currently unrecognized cryptic species remain.

- Class Leptocardii
  - Family Branchiostomatidae Bonaparte 1846
    - Genus Asymmetron Andrews 1893 [Amphioxides Gill 1895]
      - Asymmetron inferum Nishikawa 2004
      - Asymmetron lucayanum Andrews 1893 (Sharptail lancelet)
    - Genus Branchiostoma Costa 1834 non Newport 1845 non Banks 1905 [Amphioxus Yarrell 1836; Limax Pallas 1774 non Linnaeus 1758 non Férussac 1819 non Martyn 1784; Dolichorhynchus Willey 1901 non Mulk & Jairajpuri 1974]
      - Branchiostoma africae Hubbs 1927
      - Branchiostoma arabiae Webb 1957
      - Branchiostoma bazarutense Gilchrist 1923
      - Branchiostoma belcheri (Gray 1847) (Belcher's lancelet)
      - Branchiostoma bennetti Boschung & Gunter 1966 (Mud lancelet)
      - Branchiostoma bermudae Hubbs 1922
      - Branchiostoma californiense Andrews 1893 (Californian lancelet)
      - Branchiostoma capense Gilchrist 1902
      - Branchiostoma caribaeum Sundevall 1853 (Caribbean lancelet)
      - Branchiostoma elongatum (Sundevall 1852)
      - Branchiostoma floridae Hubbs 1922 (Florida lancelet)
      - Branchiostoma gambiense Webb 1958
      - Branchiostoma indicum (Willey 1901)
      - Branchiostoma japonicum (Willey 1897) (Pacific lancelet)
      - Branchiostoma lanceolatum (Pallas 1774) (European lancelet)
      - Branchiostoma leonense Webb 1956
      - Branchiostoma longirostrum Boschung 1983 (Shellhash lancelet)
      - Branchiostoma malayanum Webb 1956
      - Branchiostoma moretonense Kelly 1966; nomen dubium
      - Branchiostoma nigeriense Webb 1955
      - Branchiostoma platae Hubbs 1922
      - Branchiostoma senegalense Webb 1955
      - Branchiostoma tattersalli Hubbs 1922
      - Branchiostoma virginiae Hubbs 1922 (Virginian lancelet)
    - Genus Epigonichthys Peters 1876 [Amphipleurichthys Whitley 1932; Bathyamphioxus Whitley 1932; Heteropleuron Kirkaldy 1895; Merscalpellus Whitley 1932; Notasymmetron Whitley 1932; Paramphioxus Haekel 1893; Zeamphioxus Whitley 1932]
      - Epigonichthys australis (Raff 1912)
      - Epigonichthys bassanus (Günther 1884)
      - Epigonichthys cingalensis (Kirkaldy 1894); nomen dubium
      - Epigonichthys cultellus Peters 1877
      - Epigonichthys hectori (Benham 1901) (Hector's lancelet)
      - Epigonichthys maldivensis (Foster Cooper 1903)

The cladogram presented here illustrates the phylogeny (family tree) of lancelets, and follows a simplified version of the relationships found by Igawa and colleagues (2017):

- Chordata
  - Olfactores
  - Lancelet? 518 mya ?
    - †Cathaymyrus? († 518 mya)
    - †Palaeobranchiostoma? († 273.01 mya)
    - Lancelet (crown group) 46.0 mya
      - Asymmetron
        ⊞
        ⊟
        - Asymmetron inferum
        - Asymmetron lucayanum
        - Asymmetron maldivense
      - - Epigonichthys
          ⊞
          ⊟
          - Epigonichthys cultellus
          - Epigonichthys maldivensis
        - Branchiostoma
          ⊞
          ⊟
          - - Branchiostoma lanceolatum
            - Branchiostoma floridae
          - - Branchiostoma japonicum
            - Branchiostoma belcheri

== See also ==
- Phylliroe
