= Notochord =

Flexible rod-shaped structure in all chordates

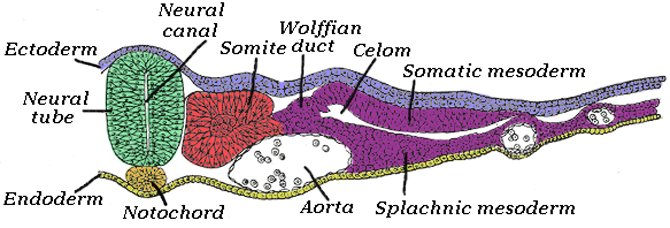
- Transverse section of a chick embryo of forty-five hours' incubation.

Details
- Precursor: Axial mesoderm
- Gives rise to: Nucleus pulposus

Identifiers
- Latin: notochorda
- MeSH: D009672
- TE: E5.0.1.1.0.0.8
- FMA: 85521

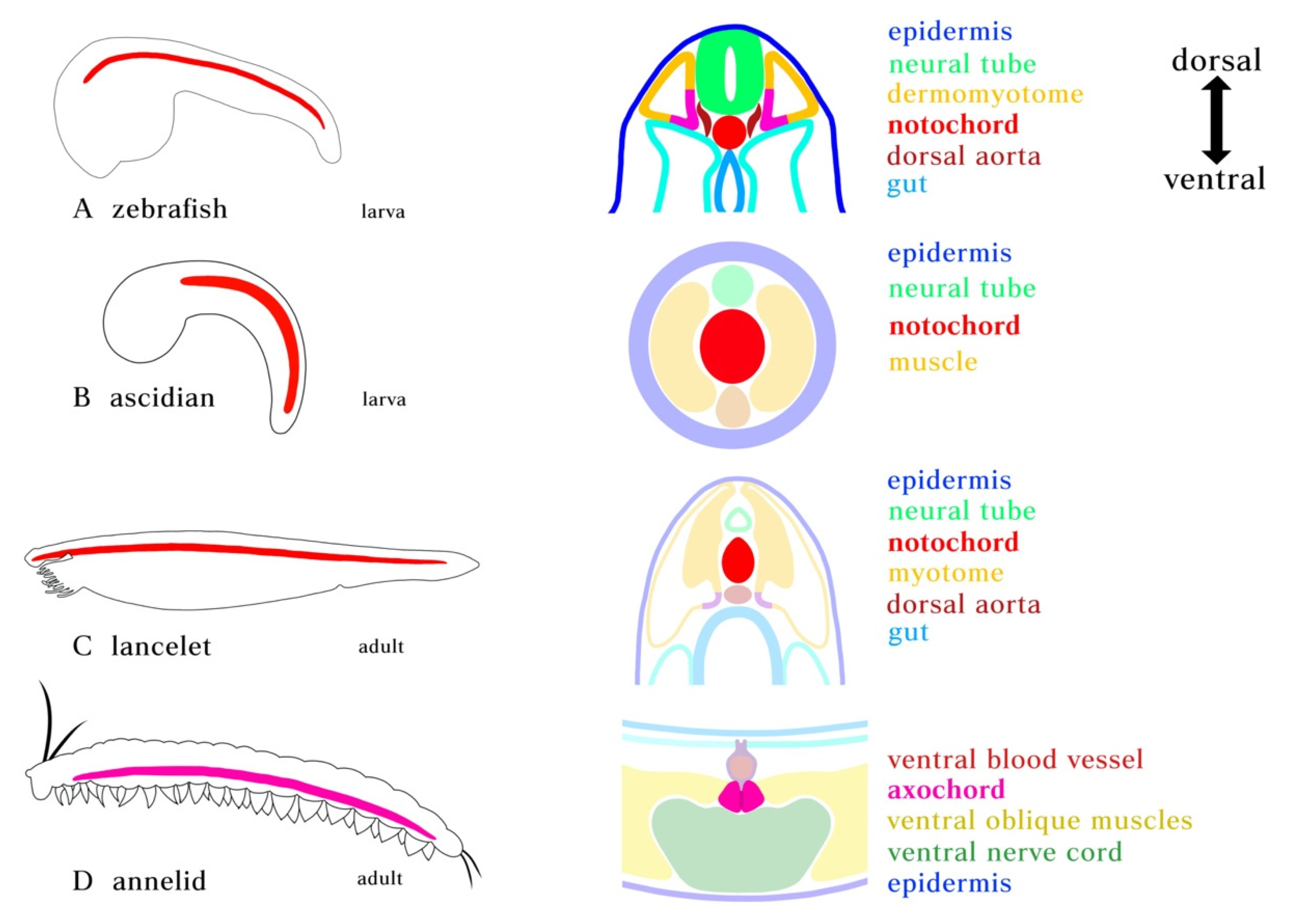
Position of notochords and axochords in bilaterians. (A) Zebrafish notochord. (B) Ascidian notochord. (C) Lancelet notochord. Notochord is positioned just ventral to the neural tube and dorsal to the gut, flanked by myotome. (D) Notochord homolog in annelid. Cross-section showing the position of the proposed axochord to the ventral mesentery, blood vessel, and nerve chord. Axochord is found to be dorsal to the nerve chord and ventral to gut of the animal. Red: notochord; Magenta: axochord; Green: nerve chord; Blue: epidermis; Yellow: mesoderm.

The notochord is an elastic, rod-like structure found in chordates. In vertebrates the notochord is an embryonic structure that disintegrates, as the vertebrae develop, to become the nucleus pulposus in the intervertebral discs of the vertebral column. In non-vertebrate chordates, the notochord persists during development.

The notochord is derived from the embryonic mesoderm and consists of an inner core of vacuolated cells filled with glycoproteins, covered by two helical collagen-elastin sheaths. It lies longitudinally along the rostral-caudal (head to tail) axis of the body, dorsal to the gut tube, and ventral to the dorsal nerve cord. Some chordate invertebrates, such as tunicates, develop a notochord during the larval stage but lose it through subsequent stages into adulthood.

The notochord is important for signaling the dorso-ventral patterning of cells coming from the mesodermal progenitors. This helps form the precursors needed for certain organs and the embryo to develop. In summary, the notochord plays essential roles in embryonic development.

The notochord provides a directional reference to the surrounding tissue as a midline structure during embryonic development, acts as a precursor for vertebrae and a primitive axial endoskeleton. In aquatic animals it can facilitate tail motion when swimming.

== Presence ==
In cephalochordates (lancelets), the notochord persists throughout life as the main structural support of the body.

In tunicates, the notochord is present only in the larval stage, becoming completely absent in the adult animal, and the notochord is not vacuolated.

In all vertebrates other than the hagfish, the notochord is present only during early embryonic development and is later replaced by the bony and/or cartilaginous vertebral column, with its original structure being integrated into the intervertebral discs as the nucleus pulposus.

== Structure ==
The notochord is a long, rod-like midline structure that develops dorsal to the gut tube and ventral to the neural tube. The notochord is composed primarily of a glycoproteins core that is encased in a sheath of collagen fibers. This is wound into two opposing helices. The glycoproteins are stored in vacuolated, turgid cells, which are covered with caveolae on their cell surface. The angle between these fibers determines whether increased pressure in the core will result in shortening and thickening versus lengthening and thinning.

Alternating contraction of muscle fibers attached to each side of the notochord result in a side-to-side motion resembling stern sculling, which allows locomotion. The stiffened notochord prevents movement through telescoping motion such as that of an earthworm.

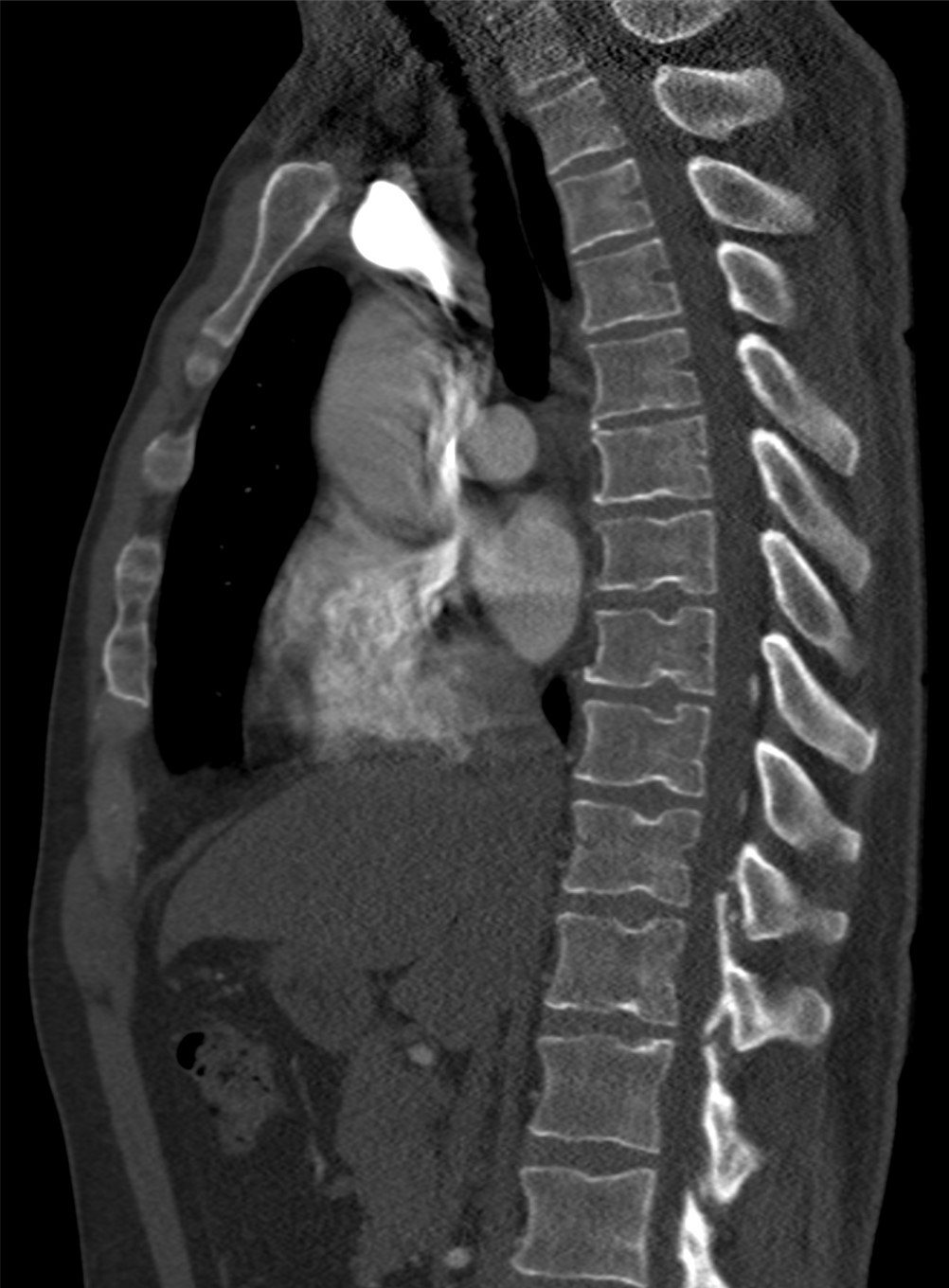
Notochord regression anomaly: linear pattern of indentations in vertebral discs.

== Role in signaling and development ==
The notochord plays a key role in signaling and coordinating development. Embryos of modern vertebrates form transient notochord structures during gastrulation. The notochord is found ventral to the neural tube.

Notogenesis is the development of the notochord by epiblasts that form the floor of the amnion cavity. The progenitor notochord is derived from cells migrating from the primitive node and pit. The notochord forms during gastrulation and soon after induces the formation of the neural plate (neurulation), synchronizing the development of the neural tube. On the ventral aspect of the neural groove, an axial thickening of the endoderm takes place. (In bipedal chordates, e.g. humans, this surface is properly referred to as the anterior surface). This thickening appears as a furrow (the chordal furrow) the margins of which anastomose (come into contact), and so convert it into a solid rod of polygonal-shaped cells (the notochord) which is then separated from the endoderm.

In vertebrates, it extends throughout the entire length of the future vertebral column, and reaches as far as the anterior end of the midbrain, where it ends in a hook-like extremity in the region of the future dorsum sellae of the sphenoid bone. Initially, it exists between the neural tube and the endoderm of the yolk-sac; soon, the notochord becomes separated from them by the mesoderm, which grows medially and surrounds it. From the mesoderm surrounding the neural tube and notochord, the skull, vertebral column, and the membranes of the brain and medulla spinalis are developed. Because it originates from the primitive node and is ultimately positioned with the mesodermal space, it is considered to be derived from mesoderm.

A postembryonic vestige of the notochord is found in the nucleus pulposus of the intervertebral discs. Isolated notochordal remnants may escape their lineage-specific destination in the nucleus pulposus and instead attach to the outer surfaces of the vertebral bodies, from which notochordal cells largely regress.

=== In amphibians and fish ===
During development of amphibians and fish, the notochord induces development of the hypochord through secretion of vascular endothelial growth factor. The hypochord is a transient structure ventral to the notochord, and is primarily responsible for correct development of the dorsal aorta.

Notochord flexion, when the notochord bends to form a part of the developing caudal fin, is a hallmark of an early growth stage of some fish.

=== In humans ===
By the age of 4, all notochord residue is replaced by a population of chondrocyte-like cells of unclear origin. Persistence of notochordal cells within the vertebra may cause a pathologic condition: persistent notochordal canal. If the notochord and the nasopharynx do not separate properly during embryonic development, a depression (Tornwaldt bursa) or Tornwaldt cyst may form. The cells are the likely precursors to a rare cancer called chordoma.

== Neurology ==
Research into the notochord has played a key role in understanding the development of the central nervous system. By transplanting and expressing a second notochord near the dorsal neural tube, 180 degrees opposite of the normal notochord location, one can induce the formation of motor neurons in the dorsal tube. Motor neuron formation generally occurs in the ventral neural tube, while the dorsal tube generally forms sensory cells.

The notochord secretes a protein called sonic hedgehog (SHH), a key morphogen regulating organogenesis and having a critical role in signaling the development of motor neurons. The secretion of SHH by the notochord establishes the ventral pole of the dorsal-ventral axis in the developing embryo.

== Evolution in chordates ==
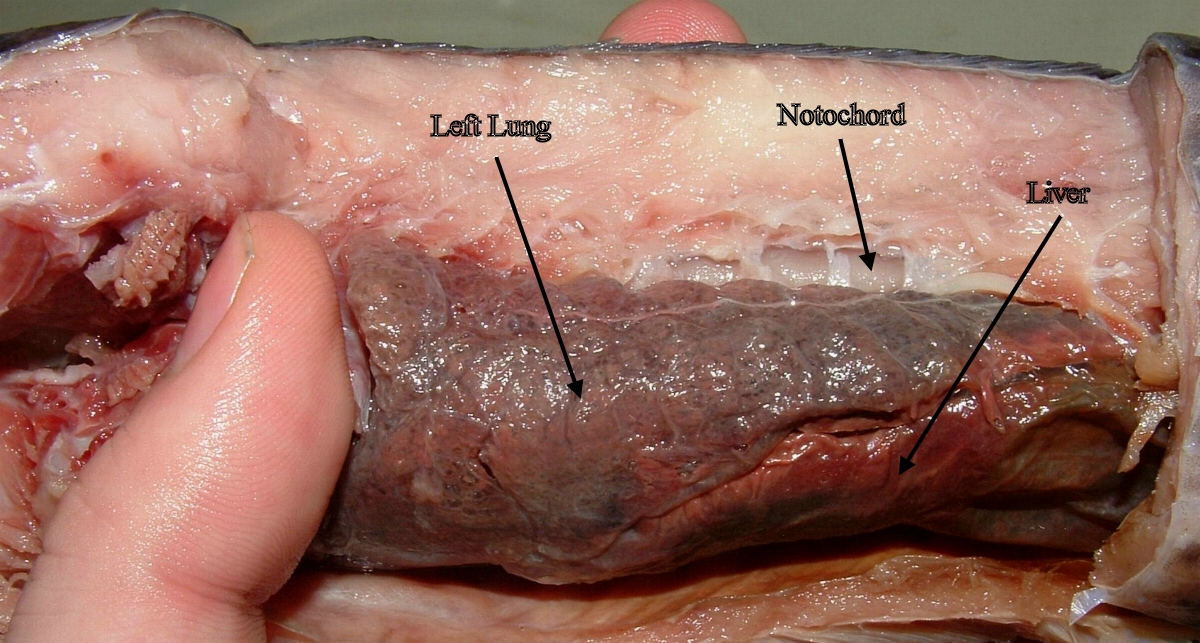
A dissected spotted African lungfish showing the notochord

The notochord is the defining feature (synapomorphy) of chordates, and was present throughout life in many of the earliest chordates. Although the stomochord of hemichordates was once thought to be homologous or from a common lineal origin, it is now viewed as analogous, convergent, or from a different lineal origin. Pikaia appears to have a proto-notochord, and notochords are present in several basal chordates such as Haikouella, Haikouichthys, and Myllokunmingia, all from the Cambrian.

The Ordovician oceans included many diverse species of Agnatha and early Gnathostomata which possessed notochords, either with attached bony elements or without, most notably the conodonts, placoderms, and ostracoderms. Even after the evolution of the vertebral column in chondrichthyes and osteichthyes, these taxa remained common and are well represented in the fossil record. Several species (see list below) have reverted to the primitive state, retaining the notochord into adulthood, though the reasons for this are not well understood.

Scenarios for the evolutionary origin of the notochord were comprehensively reviewed by Annona, Holland, and D'Aniello (2015). They point out that, although many of these ideas have not been well supported by advances in molecular phylogenetics and developmental genetics, two of them have actually been revived under the stimulus of modern molecular approaches:

1. That the notochord evolved de novo in chordates by combining development programs in new ways.
2. That the notochord derives from a homologous muscular structure, the axochord, that was present in annelid-like ancestors of the chordates. Supported by gene expression patterns and identification of said muscular structures in various inveterates, but cannot fully rule out the possibility of homoplasy.

Deciding between these two scenarios (or possibly another yet to be proposed) should be facilitated by much more thorough studies of gene regulatory networks in a wide spectrum of animals.

=== Post-embryonic retention ===
In most vertebrates, the notochord develops into secondary structures. In other chordates, the notochord is retained as an essential anatomical structure. The evolution of the notochord within the phylum Chordata is considered in detail by Holland and Somorjai (2020). Vertebrates now have spines so they do not need a notochord.

The following organisms retain a post-embryonic notochord:

- Acipenseriformes (paddlefish and sturgeon)
- Lancelet (Amphioxus)
- Tunicate (larval stage only)
- Hagfish
- Lamprey
- Coelacanth
- Lungfish
- Tadpoles
- Ostracoderms (extinct)

=== Within lancelets ===
The notochord of the lancelet (amphioxus) protrudes beyond the anterior end of the neural tube. This projection serves a second purpose in allowing the animal to burrow within the sediment of shallow waters. There, amphioxus is a filter feeder and spends most of its life partially submerged within the sediment.

== Additional images ==
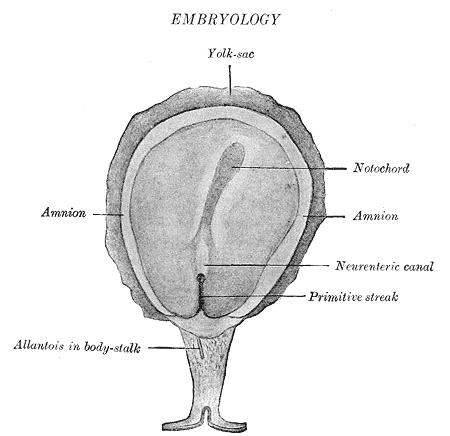
Surface view of embryo of Concolor gibbon (Hylobates concolor).

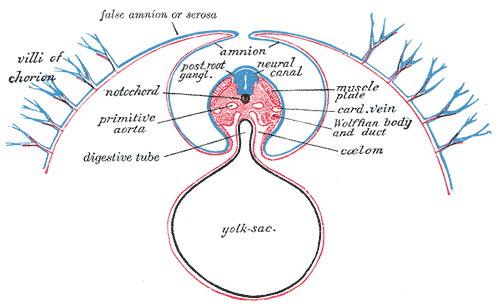
Diagram of a transverse section, showing the mode of formation of the amnion in the chick.

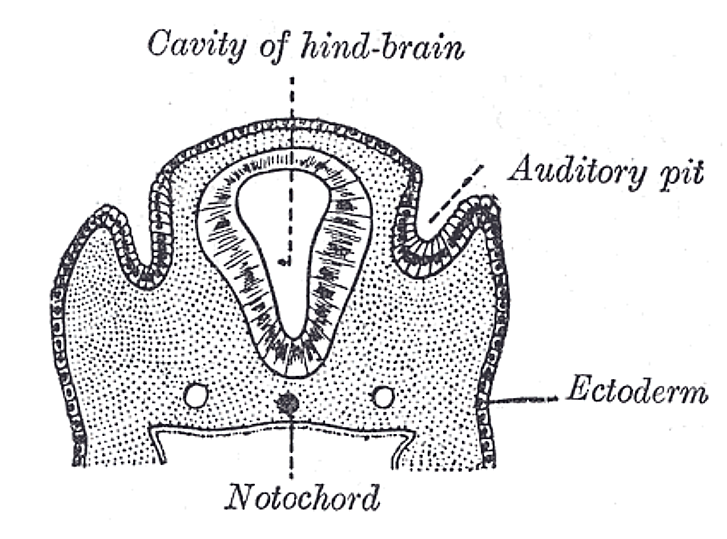
Section through the head of a human embryo, about twelve days old, in the region of the hind-brain.

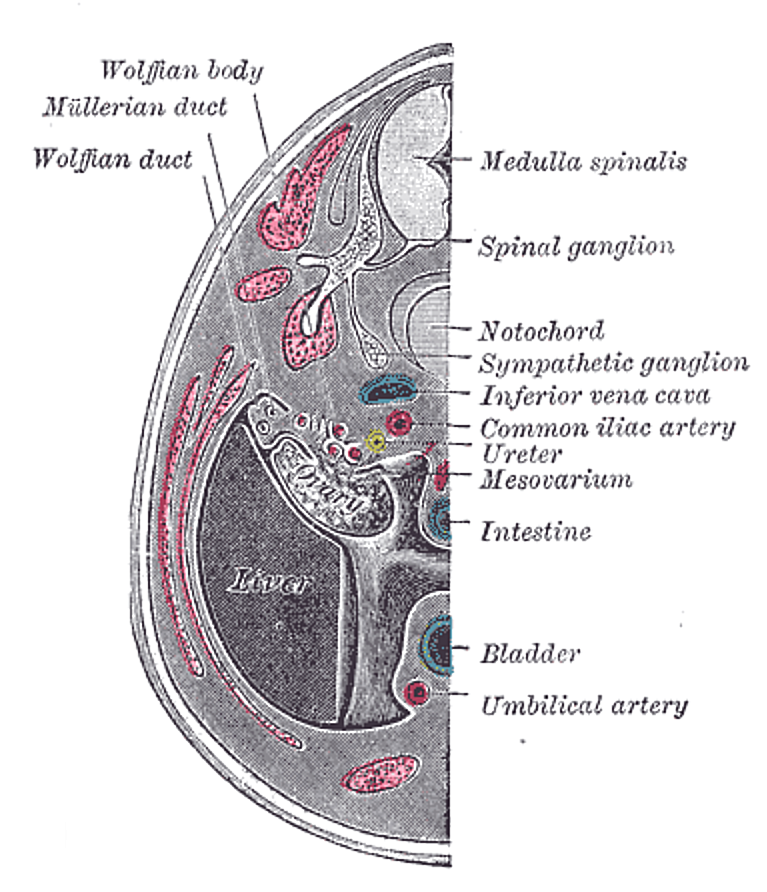
Transverse section of human embryo eight and a half to nine weeks old.
