= Branchiostoma floridae =

- Microscopy observation of a living Branchiostoma floridae exhibiting its natural GFP expression

Scientific classification
- Kingdom: Animalia
- Phylum: Chordata
- Subphylum: Cephalochordata
- Class: Leptocardii
- Family: Branchiostomatidae
- Genus: Branchiostoma
- Species: B. floridae

Binomial name
- Branchiostoma floridae Hubbs, 1922

Species of lancelet

Branchiostoma floridae, the Florida lancelet, is a lancelet of the genus Branchiostoma. The genome of this species has been sequenced, revealing that among the chordates, the morphologically simpler tunicates are actually more closely related to vertebrates than lancelets. An embryo of a Florida amphioxus (Branchiostoma floridae) has a larval pharynx with gill slits that is asymmetrical. The gill slits in the larval pharynx form in the center of the embryo when it is in its earliest stage of development (primordial) meaning the thick layer of endoderm is overlapped by a thin layer; which aids into making the B. floridae asymmetrical from left to right. The lancelet Branchiostoma floridae maintains a high level of Fox transcription factor gene diversity, with 32 distinct Fox genes in its genome, and 21,229 clusters of cDNA clones, making it very useful to the research community.

== Life and physiology ==
The breeding season for Branchiostoma floridae typically spans from late spring to late summer, with spawning occurring every 1 to 15 days. Sexual maturity also occurred similarly in both males and females.
