= List of Panamanian monkey species =

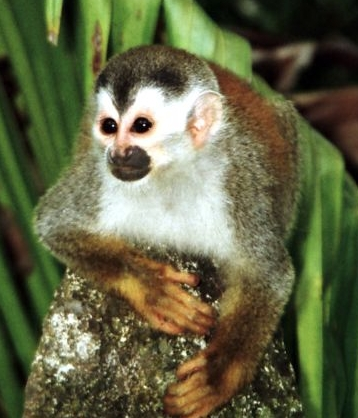
The range of the Central American squirrel monkey within Panama no longer includes its type locality of David.

At least six monkey species are native to Panama. A seventh species, the Coiba Island howler (Alouatta coibensis) is often recognized, but some authors treat it as a subspecies of the mantled howler, (A. palliata). An eighth species, the black-headed spider monkey is also often recognized, but some authorities regard it as a subspecies of Geoffroy's spider monkey. All Panamanian monkey species are classified taxonomically as New World monkeys, and they belong to four families. The Coiba Island howler, mantled howler, black-headed spider monkey and Geoffroy's spider monkey all belong to the family Atelidae. The white-faced capuchins and Central American squirrel monkey belong to the family Cebidae. the family that includes the capuchin monkeys and squirrel monkeys. The Panamanian night monkey belongs to the family Aotidae, and Geoffroy's tamarin belongs to the family Callitrichidae.

The mantled howler, the Panamanian night monkey, Geoffroy's spider monkey and the Panamanian white-faced capuchin all have extensive ranges within Panama. Geoffroy's tamarin also has a fairly wide range within Panama, from west of the Panama Canal to the Colombian border. The range of the black-headed spider monkey and Colombian white-faced capuchin within Panama are limited to the eastern portion of the country near the Colombian border. The Central American squirrel monkey only occurs within Panama in the extreme western portion of the country, near Costa Rica. It now has a smaller range within Panama than in the past, and is no longer found in its type locality, the city of David. As its name suggests, the Coiba Island howler is restricted to Coiba Island. The Azuero howler monkey (Alouatta coibensis trabeata or Alouatta palliata trabeata), which is considered a subspecies of either the Coiba Island howler or the mantled howler, is restricted to the Azuero Peninsula.

The black-headed spider monkey is the largest Panamanian monkey, with an average size of 8.89 kilograms (19.6 lb) for males and 8.8 kilograms (19 lb) for males. Geoffroy's spider monkey is the next largest, followed by the howler monkey species. Geoffroy's tamarin is the smallest Panamanian monkey, with an average size of about 0.5 kilograms (1.1 lb).

One Panamanian monkey, the black-headed spider monkey, is considered to be critically endangered by the International Union for Conservation of Nature (IUCN), and Geoffroy's spider monkey is considered to be endangered. The Central American squirrel monkey was once considered endangered, but its conservation status was upgraded to vulnerable in 2008. The Coiba Island howler is also considered to be vulnerable. Three species, the mantled howler, the white-faeced capuchin and Geoffroy's tamarin are rated as "least concern" from a conservation standpoint.

== Key ==
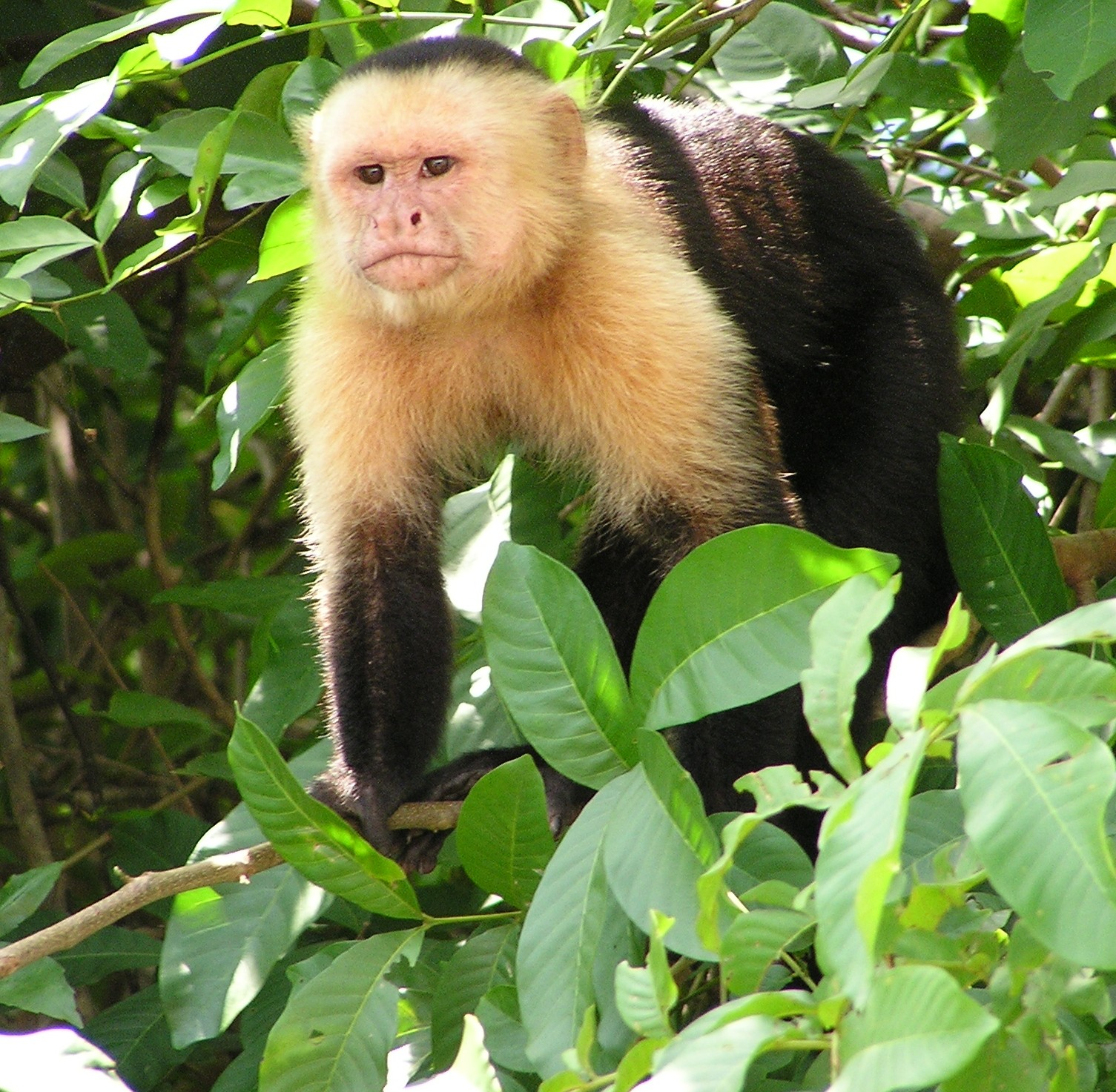
The Panamanian white-faced capuchin is found throughout Panama, except the easternmost portion where it is replaced by the similar Colombian white-faced capuchin.

Latin name	Latin binomial name, or scientific name, of the species
Common name	Common name of the species, per Wilson, et al. Mammal Species of the World (2005)
Family	Family within New World monkeys to which the species belongs
Average size – male	Average size of adult male members of the species, in kilograms and pounds
Average size – female	Average size of adult female members of the species, in kilograms and pounds
Conservation status	Conservation status of the species, per IUCN as of 2008

== Panamanian monkey species ==
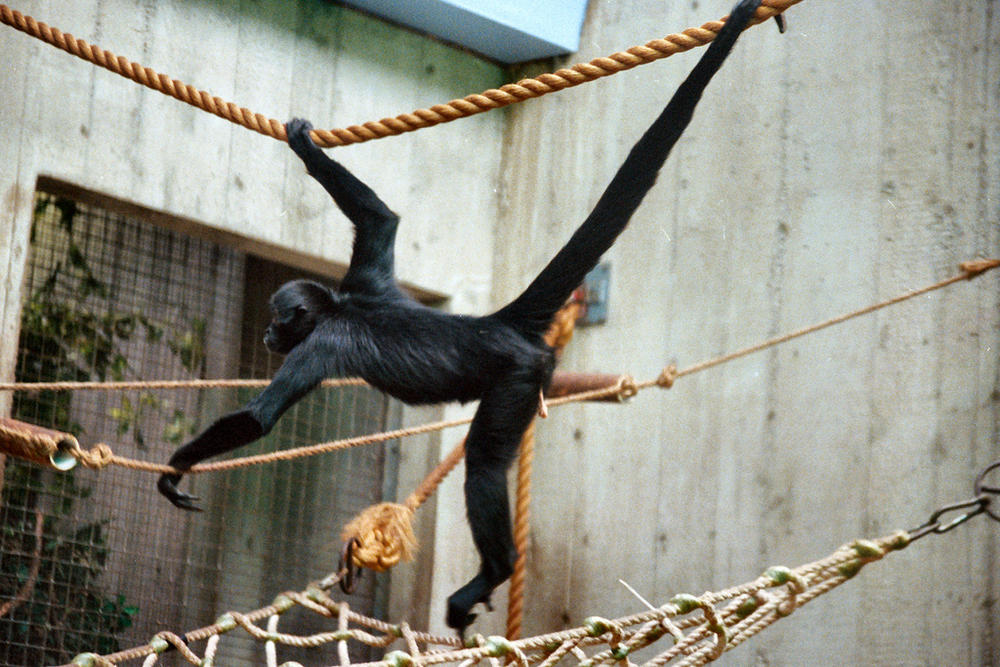
The critically endangered black-headed spider monkey (Ateles fusciceps) is the largest Panamanian monkey.

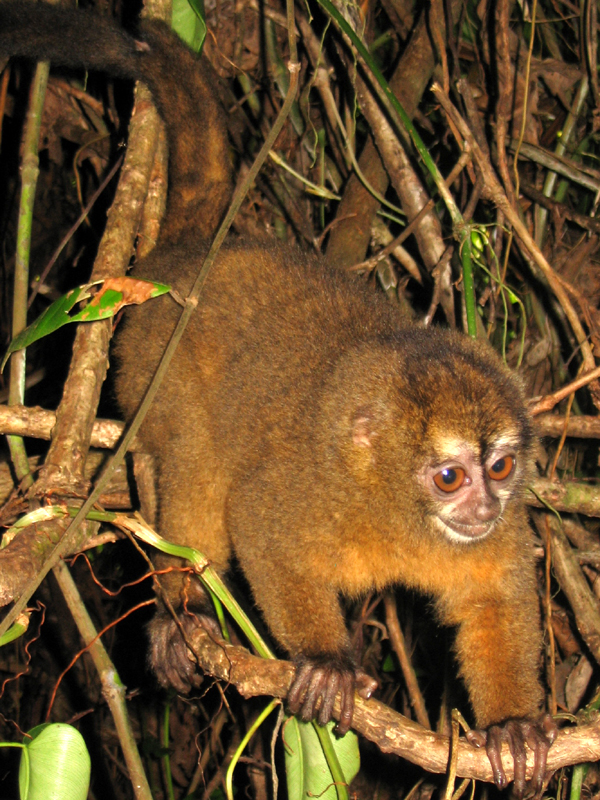
The Panamanian night monkey (Aotus zonalis) is the only nocturnal Panamanian monkey.

Latin name	Common name	Family	Average size – male	Average size – female	Conservation status	References
Alouatta coibensis^{[a]}	Coiba Island howler	Atelidae	7.150 kg (15.76 lb)	5.350 kg (11.79 lb)	Vulnerable	
Alouatta palliata	Mantled howler	Atelidae	7.150 kg (15.76 lb)	5.350 kg (11.79 lb)	Least Concern	
Aotus zonalis^{[b]}	Panamanian night monkey	Aotidae	0.889 kg (1.96 lb)	0.916 kg (2.02 lb)	Data Deficient	
Ateles fusciceps^{[c]}	Black-headed spider monkey	Atelidae	8.890 kg (19.60 lb)	8.800 kg (19.40 lb)	Critically Endangered	
Ateles geoffroyi	Geoffroy's spider monkey	Atelidae	8.210 kg (18.10 lb)	7.700 kg (16.98 lb)	Endangered	
Cebus capucinus^{[d]}	Colombian white-faced capuchin	Cebidae	3.668 kg (8.09 lb)	2.666 kg (5.88 lb)	Least Concern	
Cebus imitator	Panamanian white-faced capuchin	Cebidae	3.668 kg (8.09 lb)	2.666 kg (5.88 lb)	Least Concern	
Saguinus geoffroyi	Geoffroy's tamarin	Callitrichidae	0.486 kg (1.07 lb)	0.507 kg (1.12 lb)	Least Concern	
Saimiri oerstedii	Central American squirrel monkey	Cebidae	0.829 kg (1.83 lb)	0.695 kg (1.53 lb)	Vulnerable	

== Footnotes ==
- ^{a} Sometimes regarded as a subspecies of Alouatta palliata. Sizes given are for Alouatta palliata.
- ^{b} Sometimes regarded as a subspecies of Aotus lemurinus, in which case its trinomial name is Aotus lemurinis zonalis.
- ^{c} Sometimes regarded as a subspecies of Ateles geoffroyi.
- ^{d} Formerly regarded to be conspecific with Cebus imitator. Sizes given are for Cebus imitator.
