= The Americas (TV series) =

American documentary series

- Genre: Nature documentary
- Narrated by: Tom Hanks
- Theme music composer: Hans Zimmer
- Composers: Hans Zimmer; Anže Rozman; Kara Talve
- Country of origin: United States
- Original language: English
- No. of seasons: 1
- No. of episodes: 10 (and 2 specials)

Production
- Executive producer: Mike Gunton
- Editor: Holly Spearing
- Production companies: BBC Studios Natural History Unit; Universal Television Alternative Studio

Original release
- Network: NBC; BBC One
- Release: February 23, 2025 – present

The Americas is a 2025 NBC television nature documentary series narrated by Tom Hanks which highlights two of the world's continents, North America and South America. Made by the BBC Studios Natural History Unit, the series premiered on February 23, 2025, and received mixed to positive reviews. In June 2026, the series was renewed for a second season, which is set to premiere in 2028.

== Episodes ==
=== Season 1 (2025) ===
No.	Title	Original release date	Prod. code	U.S. viewers (millions)	Rating (18-49)
1	"The Atlantic Coast"	February 23, 2025	101	4.67	0.43/6
On the East Coast of the United States, a Banker horse defends his territory against an intruding stallion on the Outer Banks of North Carolina; sand tiger sharks gather among shipwrecks and interact with jacks and scad in the Graveyard of the Atlantic off the Outer Banks; a bald eagle battles with an osprey over a fish along the Chesapeake Bay; after 17 years underground, vast numbers of periodical cicadas emerge in suburban Maryland; a raccoon family lives in New York City and evades attack by a red-tailed hawk; fireflies light up an Appalachian forest on a summer night; an American black bear and her cubs look for cherries in the Great Smoky Mountains of Tennessee; a red oak tree in Massachusetts sheds its leaves in the autumn, part of a transformation of eastern forests to fall colors that are visible from space.
2	"Mexico"	February 23, 2025	102	5.24	0.42/6
In Mexico, saguaro cacti grow in the Sonoran Desert; a mother cactus pygmy owl nesting in a saguaro encourages her chicks to fly for the first time while protecting them from attack by snakes, including a coachwhip snake; marine life thrives in the Sea of Cortez, where a family of orcas hunts bottlenose dolphins and blue-footed boobies mate and nest on San Pedro Mártir Island; a variety of orchids grow in the mountainous jungles of southern Mexico, where a male orchid bee creates a perfume to attract mates by gathering scents from a variety of sources and competes with a rival for scent from a Stanhopea orchid; Mexican spider monkeys live in the treetops of the tropical forest of the Yucatán Peninsula; turquoise-browed motmots live around cenotes, which provide entrances to an extensive flooded subterranean cave system under the Yucatán that is home to blind cave fish, cave brittle stars, and remipedes, and where haloclines create optical illusions; jaguars hunt in the mangrove forests along the coast of the Yucatán, where local people observe the Day of the Dead holiday; monarch butterflies hibernate in the forests of central Mexico during the winter.
3	"The Wild West"	March 2, 2025	103	3.71	0.28/3
In the western United States, a coyote seeks food in Yellowstone in the Rocky Mountains of Wyoming during winter, encountering a red fox and competing with otters to catch cutthroat trout near the Grand Prismatic Spring; a prairie rattlesnake spends her pregnancy in the mountains before finally giving birth; acorn woodpeckers gather acorns in the foothills of the Sierra Nevada in California during the autumn; in the Sonoran Desert of Arizona, honeypot ants store water and nectar and raise flying ants that swarm to found new colonies; a bobcat mother seeks water in the Sonoran Desert; on the Great Plains, American bison in South Dakota graze and fight for mates, and sandhill cranes stop in Nebraska to feed and mate around the Platte River during their annual migration .
4	"The Amazon"	March 2, 2025	104	3.64	0.30/3
In South America, the Amazon rainforest is home to jaguars, anacondas, and capybara; giant river turtles lay their eggs on a riverbank and their hatchlings must run a gauntlet of black caiman to reach the river; during annual floods piranha and pink botos swim onto the submerged floor of the rainforest while hoatzin nest overhead; giant otters hunt peacock bass in the rivers while one of their young encounters a tapir; in a search for prey, army ants swarm across the floor of the forest, where the trees generate water vapor and seed the air with chemicals to create rain; in the jungle canopy, a family of emperor tamarins seeks food and a pair of nesting harpy eagles raises a chick; hyacinth macaws, green anacondas, and jaguar live in the Pantanal — the world's largest wetland — where yacare caiman fight over mating grounds and court females.
5	"The Frozen North"	March 9, 2025	105	3.95	0.35/5
In Canada, a polar bear must wait for a late freeze in November to hunt seals on the ice in Hudson Bay; after failing to kill a moose, a pack of wolves competes with a polar bear over a carcass along the coast; the aurora borealis lights the night sky; a Canada lynx hunts a snowshoe hare in the forests of the Yukon Territory; skiers and snowboarders must beware of spring avalanches in the mountains of Alberta; and in late April, male sharp-tailed grouse dance to attract mates on the Canadian Prairies. In Alaska, caribou cross a raging river as they migrate across the Arctic National Wildlife Refuge; male walruses make a "chiming" sound while basking in July on Round Island; and pink salmon swim upstream to mate, lay their eggs, and die.
6	"The Gulf Coast"	March 16, 2025	106	3.65	0.35/5
Along the Gulf Coast of the United States, a Louisiana black bear and her cubs emerge in the spring from their den in the Atchafalaya Swamp of Louisiana, and one adventurous cub faces danger; in the Okefenokee Swamp of southern Georgia, an American alligator protects her hatchlings from a great blue heron and helps them feed through the recently discovered behavior of "facilitated foraging"; a Georgia blind salamander hunts a worm in the darkness of the flooded subterranean caves of the Floridan Aquifer; manatees gather in warm-water springs in Crystal River, Florida, to engage in the social behavior of "cavorting"; in the Everglades of Florida, a Florida applesnail must climb a stalk of saw grass and risk predation by Everglade snail kites to lay her eggs; a large mangrove forest grows along the coast of the Everglades; burrowing owls court, mate, dig their burrows, and raise their chicks on suburban lawns in Marco Island, Florida; barrier islands — including the longest in the world, Padre Island on the southern coast of Texas — protect the coast from hurricanes but are in danger of becoming submerged by sea level rise; during a night at the southern tip of Texas, an ocelot and her kittens play together and prey on a woodrat in a thorn scrub thicket.
7	"The Andes"	March 23, 2025	107	3.45	0.30/3
In the Andes of South America, a spectacled bear and her two cubs make a treacherous descent down a steep forested mountainside in tropical Ecuador to reach the fruit of lobelia-draped higuerón trees; hummingbirds compete for food and mates in an Andean cloud forest; a marvelous spatuletail fights with other males and courts a female in a forested valley in Peru; marbled four-eyed frogs living at an altitude of 18,000 feet (5,490 m) in southern Peru can survive freezing solid at night but are endangered by the retreat of glaciers; torrent ducks and their young brave the rapids of a geothermally superheated river in Argentina to hunt aquatic fly larvae; a once-in-a-decade rainstorm creates a brief superbloom in the Atacama Desert — the world's driest desert — attracting coruros, giant caterpillar-hunting wasps, and burrowing owls; a rare rainstorm transforms Salar de Uyuni, the world's largest salt flat, into a huge, temporary, mirror-like lake; after the lake evaporates, a male salt flat lizard hunts brine flies and battles to establish a territory and find a mate; James's flamingos, Andean flamingos, and Chilean flamingos gather at Laguna Colorada, a caustic lake at an altitude of over 19,000 feet (5,790 m), to engage in group strutting dances to attract mates.
8	"The Caribbean"	March 30, 2025	108	3.76	0.35/5
In the Caribbean, a shoal of Spanish sardines feeding on plankton comes under attack by hungry sailfish; a sperm whale dives to the seabed at a depth of 2,500 feet (762 m) off Dominica to hunt squid before returning to the surface to suckle her calf; coral reefs bustle with life, especially when adjacent to mangrove forests; a lemon shark returns to the shallow water of a bay in the Bahamas where she was born to give birth to her own pups, which then swim into an inland lagoon in a mangrove forest to avoid predators and develop their hunting skills; millions of red crabs make a mass migration from the lowland forests of Cuba to the coast, mating along the way and braving death in the hot sun or while crossing the coastal highway before reaching the sea to lay their eggs; intense hurricanes can strip Caribbean islands virtually clean of vegetation, but plants have adapted to restore the landscape quickly; while the population of purple-throated caribs on Dominica recovers from huge losses it sustained during 2017's Hurricane Maria, a male defends Heliconia flowers — which he relies on for food and to attract females — from interloping bananaquits and Antillean bullfinches and succeeds in finding a mate; on Isla Jicarón off Panama, white-faced capuchins use rocks to smash open sea almonds for food.
9	"The West Coast"	April 6, 2025	109	4.50	0.39/5
Along the British Columbia Coast of Canada, a lone female sea wolf hunts butterfish, scavenges the washed-up carcass of a humpback whale, evades attack by hostile wolfpacks, and finds a lone male with which to form a new pack. Along the West Coast of the United States, fogs rolling in off the Pacific Ocean bring nutrients to coastal redwood forests of Northern California, where a wandering salamander makes a 200-foot (61 m) leap from one redwood to the forest floor and scales other redwoods to search for food and a mate among the fern mats in the canopy; sea otters hunt mussels and raise pups both in the 20-foot (6.1 m) surf along the Central Coast of California and amid boat traffic in the harbor at Monterey, California; deep-sea creatures such as the barreleye and giant larvacean live in darkness at depths of 2 to 3 miles (3.2 to 4.8 km) in Monterey Canyon; on cold-water reefs, a giant Pacific octopus preys on red rock crabs, mates, and barricades herself in a den to lay and nurture her eggs; vast numbers of seals and sea lions haul up on the beach on San Miguel Island off Southern California each summer; sea lions, skipjack tuna, seabirds, and humpback whales attack a bait ball of anchovies; farther out to sea, four migrating blue whales engage in as-yet unexplained activities such as racing, making a barrel roll, and breaching.
10	"Patagonia"	April 13, 2025	110	3.76	0.33/5
In Patagonia, a female rockhopper penguin braves surf breaking on a rocky coast, predation by a sea lion, and a climb up a steep slope to feed her chick on Isla de los Estados; a female puma hunts guanacos in highly changeable mountain weather to feed her cubs; the San Rafael Glacier calves into the sea; a male Chilean stag beetle climbs a 100-foot (30 m) tree in the Valdivian temperate forest and battles other males to mate with a female; a male Darwin's rhea incubates a clutch of eggs and raises a brood of chicks on the Patagonian Steppe; dust storms blow nutrients into the waters off the eastern coast; bull southern elephant seals battle for territory and a harem of females on a beach on the Valdés Peninsula; in Caleta Valdés, the matriarch of a family of orcas teaches her family how to hunt young elephant seals by snatching them off the beach.

=== Specials (2025–2026) ===
No.	Title	Original release date	Prod. code	U.S. viewers (millions)	Rating (18-49)
1	"The Making of The Americas"	April 20, 2025	100	3.15	0.25/4
A behind-the-scenes look at the making of the series, including the challenges production crews faced — and their successes — in filming flamingoes on Bolivia's Laguna Colorada, pumas in the mountains of Chile, spectacled bears in a cloud forest in Ecuador, harpy eagles in a rainforest in Venezuela, and red crabs migrating in Cuba; filming firsts that the crews achieved in the series, including a gathering of blue whales off California, a wandering salamander's leap from a redwood in Northern California, and a sperm-whale's-eye view of its dive to the sea bottom in the Caribbean; and the search for a rare ocelot and her kittens in Texas using camera traps.
2	"The Americas: A Wild 250th"	July 2, 2026	TBA	N/A	TBA

== Production ==
According to NBC Universal, production of the series took five years and involved 180 expeditions. The BBC Studios Natural History Unit produced The Americas in association with Universal Television Alternative Studio. Describing his motivation for making the series, executive producer Mike Gunton said, "I had this idea for many years that there was one place on the planet that, for some reason, no one had ever really done a full job on, which is the whole of the Americas." The president of Universal Television Alternative Studio, Toby Gorman, said "It is the most expensive unscripted project in NBC's history, as far as I know."

Drone technology played an important role in allowing the production team to film areas previously inaccessible to explorers. On several occasions the filmmakers captured creatures or animal behaviors never filmed before, including a whale's-eye view of a sperm whale diving into the deep ocean, an achievement which required a two-year effort to develop new technology to film a behavior that previously was a mystery to naturalists. The production team filmed wild Banker horses on the Outer Banks of North Carolina for three years before capturing a dramatic fight between two stallions.

While filming The Americas, the production team sought to limit its impact on the natural environment. Measures it took included tracking animals on foot, using donkeys rather than motor vehicles to transport equipment, using portable solar arrays to recharge batteries for electronic equipment, reducing travel by hiring locally whenever possible, sharing vehicles, and camping instead of staying in hotels. For these efforts, the production team earned a Gold Seal from the Environmental Media Association.

Holly Spearing of the BBC was the series's editor. Hans Zimmer composed the original score.

An event billed as "The Americas: Worldwide Preview and Fireside Chat" took place at the Palais des Festivals et des Congrès in Cannes, France, on April 9, 2024, as part of the 2024 MIPTV Media Market. It included a preview of footage shot for the episode "The Andes" and a discussion with Gorman, Gunton, and Spearing of the series and the technology used to film it.

== Broadcast ==
The Americas premiered with two episodes aired back-to-back on NBC at 7:00 p.m. and 8:00 p.m. Eastern Time on Sunday, February 23, 2025, and also simulcasted on E!, SYFY, Bravo, CNBC, and USA Network. The next two aired back-to-back at the same times on Sunday, March 2, and after that one episode aired at 8:00 pm. Eastern Time each Sunday from March 9 through April 13. The series concluded with a "Making of The Americas" episode that aired at 8:00 pm. Eastern Time on Sunday, April 20, and consisted of behind-the-scenes footage showing viewers how the filmmakers made spectacular shots seen in the series. On the day after it premiered on NBC, each episode began streaming on Peacock.

In the United Kingdom, The Americas was broadcast on BBC One.

In conjunction with the premiere of another NBC documentary miniseries, Surviving Earth, encore episodes of The Americas will air in 2026 on Thursday evenings, from June 4 to July 30. This expanded version of the series, labeled as The Americas: Fun Fact Edition, will feature additional behind-the-scenes material and "fun facts".

== Reception ==
The series received mixed to positive reviews, with reviewers—such as Daniel Fienberg for The Hollywood Reporter, Robert Daniels for RogerEbert.com, and Mary Kassell for Screen Rant—highlighting some of the cinematography as exceptional and critiquing repetitive sequences, anthropomorphism, and a perceived irresponsible absence of environmental urgency.

On the review aggregator website Rotten Tomatoes, the series holds an approval rating of 86%, based on 7 reviews, with an average rating of 6.5/10.

=== Accolades ===
Year	Award	Category	Nominee(s)	Result	Ref.
2025	Emmy Awards	Outstanding Narrator	Tom Hanks (for "The Andes")	Nominated	
2025	Emmy Awards	Outstanding Music Composition for a Documentary Series or Special (Original Dramatic Score)	Hans Zimmer, Anže Rosman, Kara Talve (for "The Andes")	Nominated	
