= Jicarita =

Pacific island of Panama

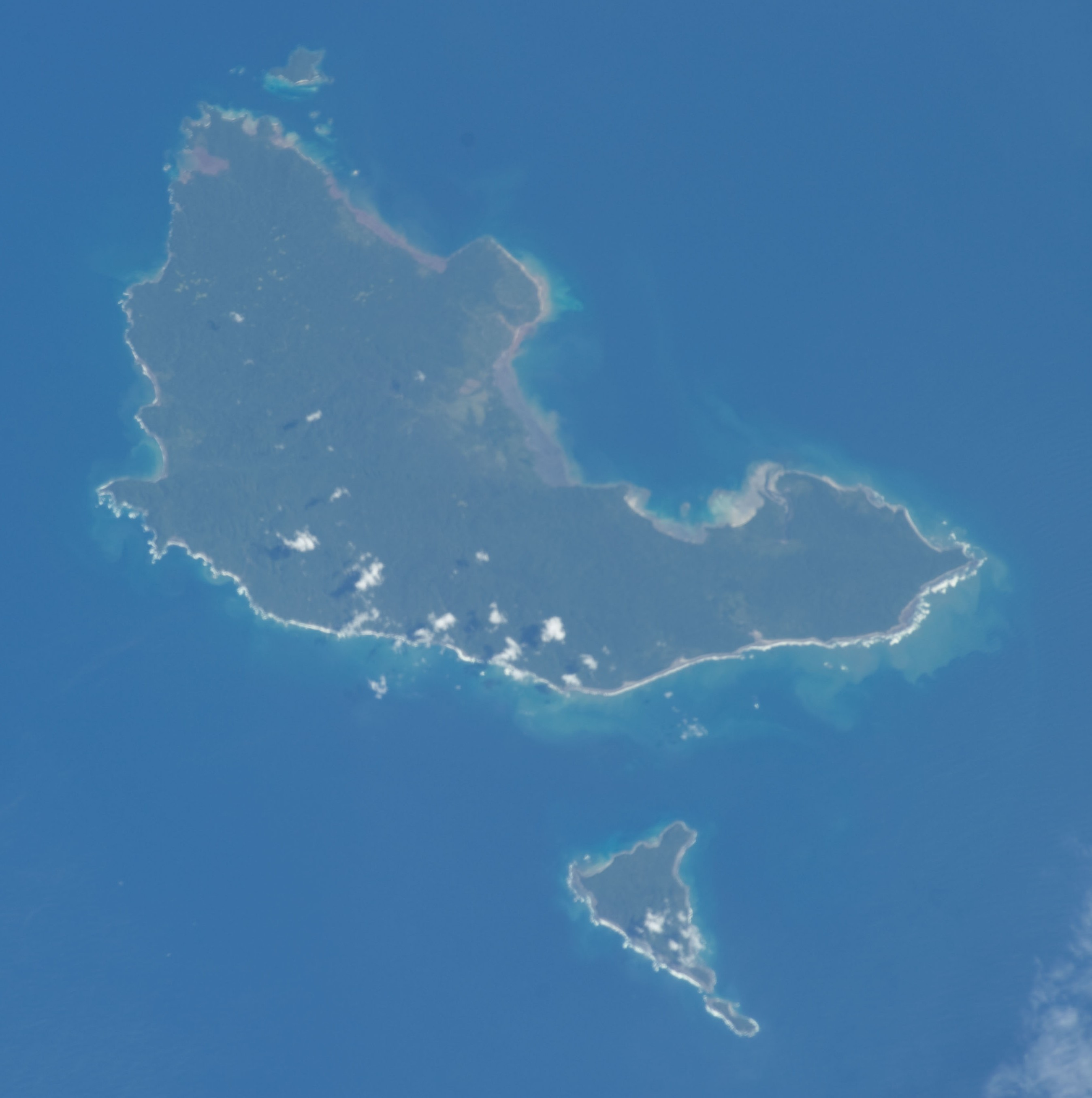
- View of the islands of Coiba (large island at top) and Jicarón (to its south) and the small island of Jicarita (off the southern tip of Jicarón) from the International Space Station in 2011.

- Location within Panama Location within Central America Location within North America

Geography
- Location: Pacific Ocean
- Coordinates: 7.2125°N 81.8025°W
- Area: 0.136 km^{2} (0.053 sq mi)
- Highest elevation: 122 m (400 ft)

Administration
- Panama
- Province: Veraguas Province
- District: Montijo District

Demographics
- Population: 0

Additional information
- Time zone: UTC−5 (EST)
- Part of Coiba National Park

Jicarita is an uninhabited island of Panama located in Montijo District in Veraguas Province. It lies off the southernmost tip of Jicarón in the Gulf of Chiriquí, an arm of the Pacific Ocean, and is part of Coiba National Park.

== Geography ==
Jicarita lies off the southernmost tip of the island of Jicarón, which in turn is located 6 to 7 kilometres (3.7 to 4.3 mi; 3.2 to 3.8 nmi) off the southernmost tip of the island of Coiba in the Gulf of Chiriquí, an arm of the Pacific Ocean, and is part of Coiba National Park. The southern tip of Jicarita is the southernmost point of Panama.

Jicarita has an area of 0.136 square kilometres (0.053 sq mi) or 136 hectares (340 acres). Its terrain is steep, with an average elevation of 25 metres (82 ft), and its highest point is at an elevation of 122 metres (400 ft). Jicarita's 6.26-kilometre (3.89 mi) coastline is mostly steep and rocky and subject to large swells from the Pacific Ocean. A continuous rocky cliff runs along the island's southernmost coast.

== Climate ==
Like the other islands of Coiba National Park, Jicarita has a tropical monsoon climate with an average temperature of 26.4 °C (79.5 °F), high humidity, and an average annual rainfall of 3,403 millimetres (133.98 in). Although rainfall is heavy during the wet season, the islands have a marked seasonality due to an annual shift in prevailing winds, with a dry season from mid-December to mid-April.

== Flora and fauna ==
Jicarita is covered in lush vegetation, with 84 percent tree cover. Jicarita and the other islands of Coiba National Park contain some of the last lowland humid forests in the southwestern Pacific coastal region of Panama.

Although the first checklist of birds found in Coiba National Park was published in 1957, finding 133 species on Coiba, it did not include any observations of bird life on Jicarita or Jicarón. Information on the birds of Jicarita and Jicarón finally was gathered between 2004 and 2019 and was published in 2020 as the first checklist of birds on the islands. It included 115 species observed on Jicarón and 53 on Jicarita, with all of the species on Jicarita also found on Jicarón. Eighty-seven of the species also had been found on Coiba, but among the birds found on Jicarita and Jicarón were 23 species never before reported in Coiba National Park. Ten of the birds on the checklist are subspecies endemic to Jicarita and Jicarón that are found nowhere else, while 29 species — seven of them warblers — are migratory birds that travel through Coiba National Park during the winter. The most common species recorded on Jicarita and Jicarón between 2004 and 2019 were the grey-headed dove, the rufous-tailed hummingbird, and the bananaquit. Colonies of seabirds — brown boobies and brown pelicans — nest on the cliffs along Jicarita's southern coast, and the over 200 brown boobies noted for the 2020 checklist represented the largest colony of the species ever recorded in Coiba National Park.

The continental shelf ends just off the southern coast of Jicarita, and the steep-sided submarine canyons that lie beyond it in waters near Jicarita serve as avenues for sea creatures migrating along the coast of Central America. Rays, sharks, sailfish, marlin, yellowfin tuna, spinner dolphins, spotted dolphins, orcas, humpback whales, and pilot whales are found off Jicarita.

== History ==
The islands of Coiba National Park became isolated from the mainland of Panama sometime between 18,000 and 10,000 BCE, when sea level rise took place at the end of the Last Glacial Period. Presumably, Jicarita and Jicarón also have been separate from Coiba since then.

On 22 July 1930, the United States annexed 25 hectares (62 acres) on Jicarita for incorporation into the Panama Canal Zone. It used the land to erect the Isla Jicarita Lighthouse as a navigational aid for ships making transits of the Panama Canal. The lighthouse, located at 07°12′19.4″N 081°47′56.6″W, has a focal height of 102 metres (335 ft). The United States transferred the Panama Canal Zone to Panama on 1 October 1979 and completed the transfer of all operation of the canal and its related facilities to Panama on 31 December 1999.

In 1992, Panama created Coiba National Park, encompassing over 2,699 square kilometres (1,042 sq mi) of islands, forests, beaches, mangroves, and coral reefs. Jicarita was included in the park, which UNESCO declared a World Heritage Site in July 2005.

== Recreational activities ==
Scuba diving and snorkeling are popular in the waters off Jicarita. The island is uninhabited, and has steep terrain, no trails into its interior, and few landing sites along its steep, rocky coast, making access difficult for human visitors.
