= Jicarón =

Pacific island of Panama

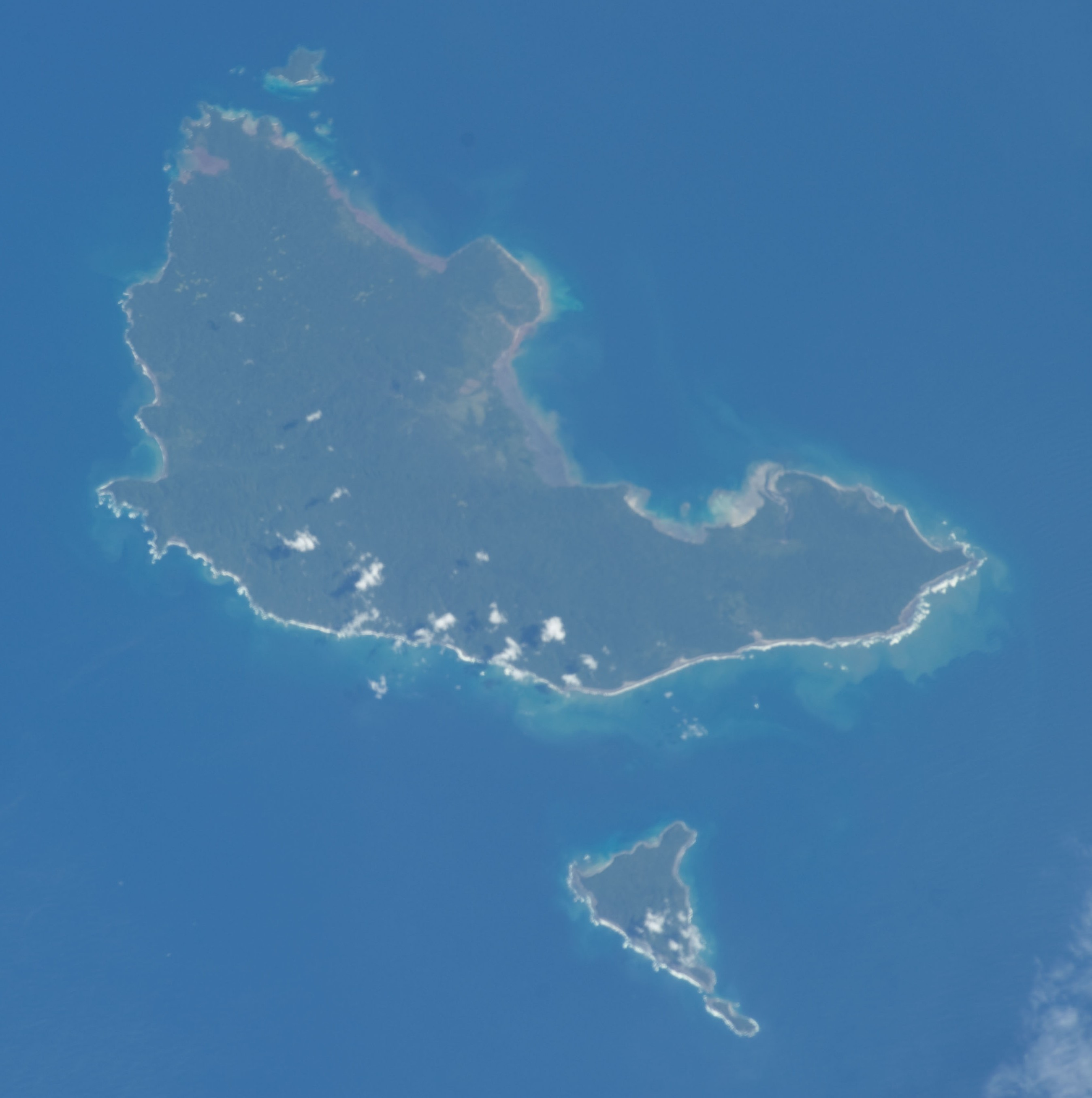
- View from the International Space Station in 2011 of the islands of Coiba (large island at top), Jicarón (to its south), and the small island of Jicarita (off the southern tip of Jicarón).

- Location within Panama Location within Central America Location within North America

Geography
- Location: Pacific Ocean
- Coordinates: 07°16′14″N 081°48′00″W
- Area: 18.68 km^{2} (7.21 sq mi)
- Highest elevation: 392 m (1286 ft)

Administration
- Panama
- Province: Veraguas Province
- District: Montijo District

Demographics
- Population: 0

Additional information
- Time zone: UTC−5 (EST)
- Part of Coiba National Park

Jicarón is an uninhabited island of Panama located in Montijo District in Veraguas Province. It lies off the southernmost tip of the island of Coiba in the Gulf of Chiriquí, an arm of the Pacific Ocean, and is part of Coiba National Park.

== Geography ==
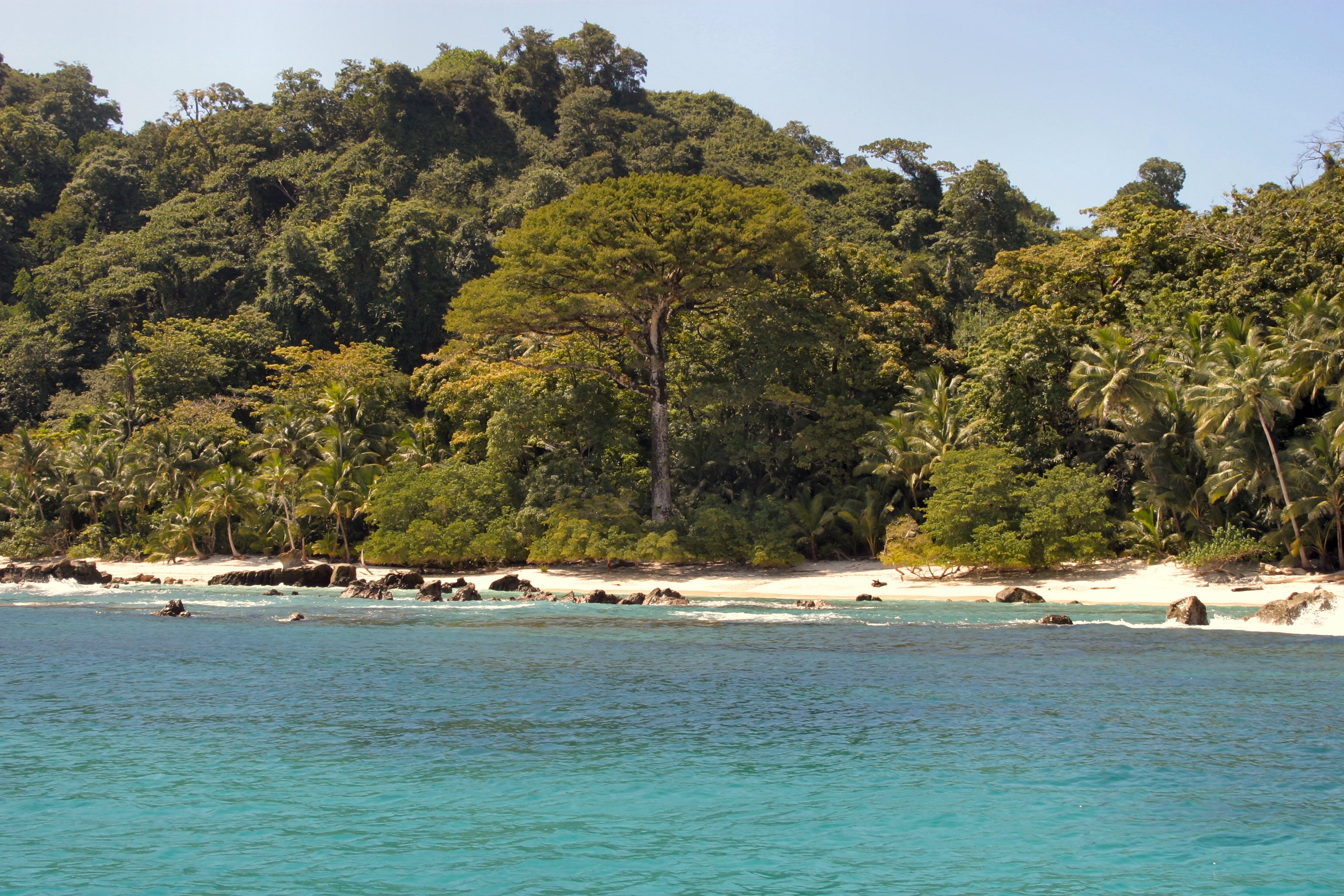
The northwestern coast of Jicarón at 7°17′25.92″N 81°49′2.08″W on 4 December 2004.

Jicarón lies 6 to 7 kilometres (3.7 to 4.3 mi; 3.2 to 3.8 nmi) off the southernmost tip of the island of Coiba in the Gulf of Chiriquí, an arm of the Pacific Ocean, and is part of Coiba National Park. The small island of Jicarita, which lies just off the southern tip of Jicarón, is the southernmost point of Panama.

Jicarón is the second-largest island in Coiba National Park, with an area of 18.68 square kilometres (7.21 sq mi), but is only a twenty-seventh the size of Coiba, which is the park's largest island. Its terrain is steep, with an average elevation of 33 metres (108 ft), and its highest point — located at 07.269°N 081.799°W — is at an elevation of 392 metres (1,286 ft). Jicarón's 25.62-kilometre (15.92 mi) coastline mostly is steep and rocky, although some pocket beaches also exist. The coast is subject to large swells from the Pacific Ocean.

== Climate ==
Like the other islands of Coiba National Park, Jicarón has a tropical monsoon climate with an average temperature of 26.4 °C (79.5 °F), high humidity, and an average annual rainfall of 3,403 millimetres (133.98 in). Although rainfall is heavy during the wet season, the islands have a marked seasonality due to an annual shift in prevailing winds, with a dry season from mid-December to mid-April.

== Flora and fauna ==
Jicarón is covered in lush vegetation, with 84 percent tree cover. Jicarón and the other islands of Coiba National Park contain some of the last lowland humid forests in the southwestern Pacific coastal region of Panama.

Both Jicarón and Coiba are home to populations of Panamanian white-faced capuchins that use stone tools to break open the seeds of Terminalia catappa (known as sea almonds or tropical almonds, among other names) for food, but scientists have noted that while both males and females use tools on Coiba, it appears that only males do on Jicarón. The difference appears to arise because of differences in socially learned behaviors between the populations on the two islands, resulting in a different sex bias regarding tool use on Jicarón than on Coiba.

Another species of monkey, the Coiba Island howler, also lives on both Jicarón and Coiba. In early 2022, motion-triggered cameras on Jicarón — operating there since 2017 to observe capuchin tool use — detected male capuchins carrying infant howlers on their backs while walking or smashing seeds with rocks. Further research indicated that during 2022 and 2023, at least five male capuchins abducted at least 11 infant howler monkeys and carried them on their backs. Although the capuchins did not harm the baby howlers, they were unable to properly care for or feed them, and at least four — and probably most or all — of the baby howlers died. By the time they announced their findings in May 2025, researchers had concluded that the cameras had captured a behavior that had only recently arisen as a "fashion fad" among a single population of male capuchins, and described the capuchins' behavior as "the first known documentation of a social tradition in which animals repeatedly abduct and carry infants of another species — without any clear benefit to themselves."

Although the first checklist of birds found in Coiba National Park was published in 1957, finding 133 species on Coiba, it did not include any observations of bird life on Jicarón or Jicarita. Information on the birds of Jicarón and Jicarita finally was gathered between 2004 and 2019 and was published in 2020 as the first checklist of birds on the islands. It included 115 species observed on Jicarón and 53 on Jicarita, with all of the species on Jicarita also found on Jicarón. Eighty-seven of the species also had been found on Coiba, but among the birds found on Jicarón were 23 species never before reported in Coiba National Park. Ten of the birds on the checklist are subspecies endemic to Jicarón and Jicarita that are found nowhere else, while 29 species — seven of them warblers — are migratory birds that travel through Coiba National Park during the winter. The most common species recorded on Jicarón and Jicarita between 2004 and 2019 were the grey-headed dove, the rufous-tailed hummingbird, and the bananaquit. Scarlet macaws, although nearly extinct on the Panamanian mainland, also were present in significant numbers on Jicarón on occasion, apparently flying in from Coiba to forage for sea almonds. A western kingbird, rarely seen in Panama, was noted on Jicarón on 20 December 2017, the southernmost observation of the species, and a yellow-crowned night heron observed on the island was the southernmost record of that species in Panama.

The continental shelf ends just off the southern coast of Jicarita, and the steep-sided submarine canyons that lie beyond it in waters near Jicarón and Jicarita serve as avenues for sea creatures migrating along the coast of Central America. Rays, sharks, sailfish, marlin, yellowfin tuna, spinner dolphins, spotted dolphins, orcas, humpback whales, and pilot whales are found off Jicarón.

== History ==
The islands of Coiba National Park became isolated from the mainland of Panama sometime between 18,000 and 10,000 BCE, when sea level rise took place at the end of the Last Glacial Period. Presumably, Jicarón also has been separate from Coiba since then.

In 1992, Panama created Coiba National Park, encompassing over 2,699 square kilometres (1,042 sq mi) of islands, forests, beaches, mangroves, and coral reefs. Jicarón was included in the park, which UNESCO declared a World Heritage Site in July 2005.

== Recreational activities ==
Scuba diving and snorkeling are popular in the waters off Jicarón. The island is uninhabited, and has steep terrain, no trails into its interior, and few landing sites along its steep, rocky coast, making access difficult for human visitors.

== In popular culture ==
Although Jicarón does not lie in the Caribbean, tool use by its population of Panamanian white-faced capuchins is featured in the final segment of Episode 8 ("The Caribbean") of the 2025 NBC television series The Americas.
