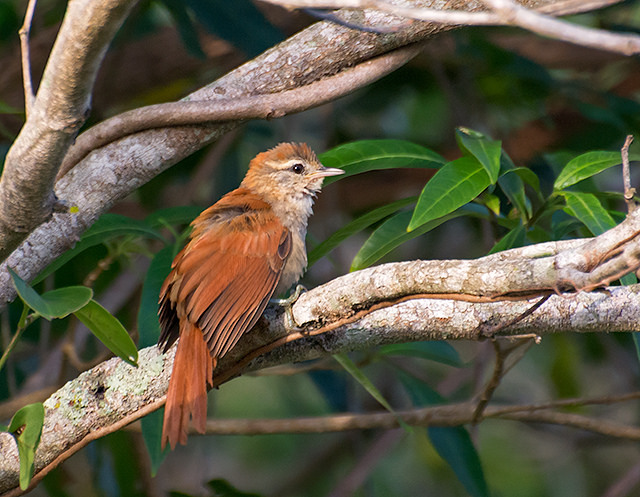

Conservation status
- Least Concern (IUCN 3.1)

Scientific classification
- Kingdom: Animalia
- Phylum: Chordata
- Class: Aves
- Order: Passeriformes
- Family: Furnariidae
- Genus: Cranioleuca
- Species: C. vulpina

Binomial name
- Cranioleuca vulpina (Pelzeln, 1856)

Synonyms
- Cranioleuca dissita Wetmore, 1957

= Rusty-backed spinetail =

Species of bird

The rusty-backed spinetail (Cranioleuca vulpina) is a Neotropical species of bird in the Furnariinae subfamily of the ovenbird family Furnariidae. It is found in Bolivia, Brazil, Colombia, Paraguay, Peru, Venezuela, and possibly Guyana.

== Taxonomy and systematics ==
The rusty-backed spinetail was formally described in 1856 by the Austrian ornithologist August von Pelzeln under the binomial name Synallaxis vulpina. Its specific epithet is from Latin vulpinus meaning "fox-like" (ie reddish-brown above and white beneath). The rusty-backed spinetail is now placed in the genus Cranioleuca that was introduced in 1853 by Ludwig Reichenbach.

Four subspecies are recognized:

- C. v. apurensis Zimmer, JT & Phelps, WH, 1948
- C. v. vulpina (Pelzeln, 1856)
- C. v. foxi Bond, J & Meyer de Schauensee, 1940
- C. v. reiseri (Reichenberger, 1922)

What are now the Coiba spinetail (C. dissita) and Parker's spinetail (C. vulpecula) were previously treated as subspecies of the rusty-backed spinetail. Other subspecies have been proposed but have not been accepted as valid.

== Description ==
The rusty-backed spinetail is 15 to 16 cm (5.9 to 6.3 in) long and weighs 14 to 17 g (0.49 to 0.60 oz). The sexes have the same plumage. Adults of the nominate subspecies C. v. vulpina have a buff supercilium and a narrow dark brownish line behind the eye on an otherwise light brownish face that has faint streaks and spots. Their forehead is brown, their crown and back reddish chestnut, their rump brown, and their uppertail coverts reddish chestnut. Their tail is also reddish chestnut. Their wings are reddish chestnut with duskier tips on the flight feathers. Their chin is buff-white and their throat buff. Their breast is light brown with faint paler streaks, their belly plain light brown, and their flanks and undertail coverts a slightly darker brown. Their iris is dark reddish brown, their maxilla black, their mandible dull horn to silvery horn, and their legs and feet dull greenish olive or grayish. Juveniles have more grayish upperparts than adults, with a variable ochraceous wash and faint mottling on their underparts.

Subspecies C. v. apurensis is the darkest subspecies overall, especially on the crown, wings, and tail. C. v. foxi has darker rufous upperparts than the nominate. C. v. reiseri is paler than the other subspecies but with more rufescent upperparts; its underparts are more buffy than the nominate's and have no streaking.

== Distribution and habitat ==
The subspecies of the rusty-backed spinetail are found thus:

- C. v. apurensis: western Venezuela's Apure state
- C. v. vulpina: northeastern Colombia, central and southern Venezuela, western Guyana, northern and central Brazil, extreme eastern Bolivia, and extreme northeastern and eastern Paraguay (but see below)
- C. v. foxi: central Bolivia's Cochabamba Department and possibly Beni Department
- C. v. reiseri: northeastern Brazil

The South American Classification Committee of the American Ornithological Society has only sight records from Guyana and so classes the species as hypothetical in that country.

The rusty-backed spinetail inhabits a variety of landscapes, all of which are on or near water. These include gallery forest, scrub on river islands, thickets along rivers, várzea forest, and shrubby areas around lakes and streams. In elevation it ranges from near sea level to 400 m (1,300 ft).

== Behavior ==
=== Movement ===
The rusty-backed spinetail is a year-round resident throughout its range.

=== Feeding ===
The rusty-backed spinetail feeds on arthropods. It typically forages singly or in pairs and occasionally joins mixed-species feeding flocks. It mostly feeds in the forest's lower levels but is known to feed higher in riverside forest. It acrobatically gleans prey from bark and dead leaves (and occasionally live ones) while hitching along small branches.

=== Breeding ===
The rusty-backed spinetail's breeding season has not been defined but appears to vary geographically. Eggs have been noted in June and July in Venezuela and in November in eastern Brazil. Its nest is a globe of grass, roots, and sticks with its interior lined with bark shreds and lichens. It is often wedged in a low tree or shrub fork above water, where it resembles flood debris. The clutch size is two to three eggs. Nothing else is known about the species' breeding biology.

=== Vocalization ===
The rusty-backed spinetail's song has variously been described as "a rapid series of emphatic notes gradually accelerating but fading, lasting c. 2·5–3 seconds, 'ch-ch-ch-chchchchchewewewewewew' ", "a series of descending, complaining notes 'scew-scew-scew- -", and a "rattly trill, descending, last 2-3 secs". Its call is "a soft, nasal, rising 'choy', 'choy-choy' or 'kuee-kweek' ".

== Status ==
The IUCN has assessed the rusty-backed spinetail as being of Least Concern. It has a very large range but its population size and trend are not known. No immediate threats have been identified. It is considered fairly common to common throughout its range.
