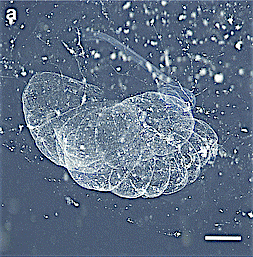
- Bathochordaeus charon, scale bar ~ 2 cm

Scientific classification
- Kingdom: Animalia
- Phylum: Chordata
- Subphylum: Tunicata
- Class: Appendicularia
- Order: Copelata
- Family: Oikopleuridae
- Genus: Bathochordaeus
- Species: B. charon

Binomial name
- Bathochordaeus charon (Chun, 1900)

= Bathochordaeus charon =

Species of marine filter feeder

Bathochordaeus charon is a species of giant larvacean, a solitary, free-swimming tunicate that filter feeds in surface waters. The species was named after Charon, the mythical Greek ferryman who carried the souls of the dead across the rivers dividing the world of the living from the world of the dead.

First description of this very large larvacean was provided in 1900 by Carl Chun from two specimens collected during the Valdivia expedition in 1898–1899. The first definitive record of Bathochordaeus charon since its original description was obtained in 2016 by R. E. Sherlock, K. R. Walz and B. H. Robison, using a ROV in the Monterey Bay, California, USA.

A small number of Bathochordaeus have been found near Bermuda, in the Indian Ocean, or off the Nansei islands but they differ significantly from B. charon.
