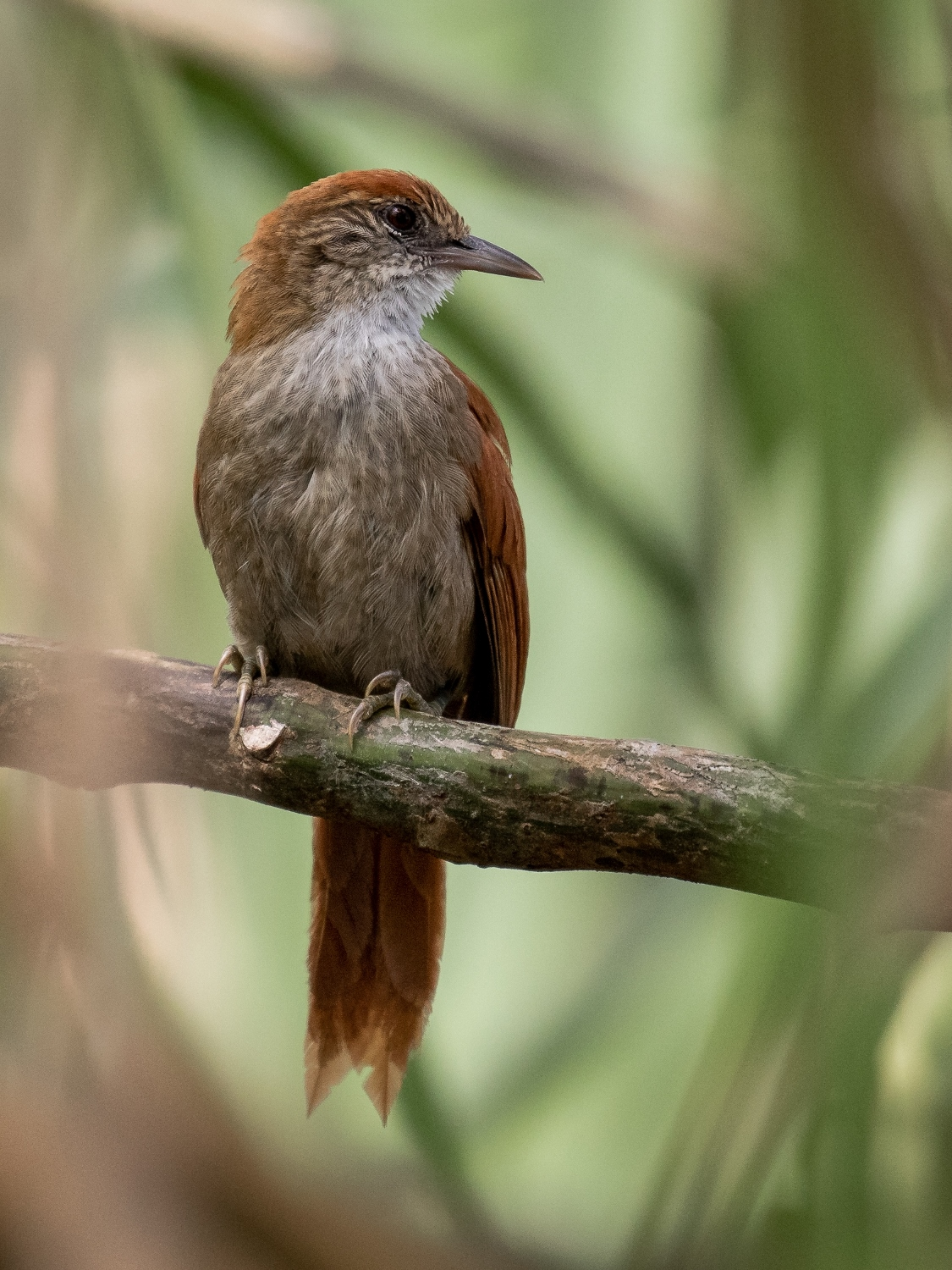
- At Marchantaria island, Iranduba, Amazonas state, Brazil

Conservation status
- Least Concern (IUCN 3.1)

Scientific classification
- Kingdom: Animalia
- Phylum: Chordata
- Class: Aves
- Order: Passeriformes
- Family: Furnariidae
- Genus: Cranioleuca
- Species: C. vulpecula

Binomial name
- Cranioleuca vulpecula (Sclater, PL & Salvin, 1866)

Synonyms
- Cranioleuca vulpina vulpecula

= Parker's spinetail =

Species of bird

Parker's spinetail (Cranioleuca vulpecula) is a species of bird in the Furnariinae subfamily of the ovenbird family Furnariidae. It is found in Bolivia, Brazil, Ecuador, and Peru.

== Taxonomy and systematics ==
Parker's spinetail was originally described as a species with the binomial Synallaxis vulpecula. Later it was treated as a subspecies of the rusty-backed spinetail (Cranioleuca vulpina) but starting in the late twentieth century it was separated again as a species in its own right. subsequent phylogenetic work showed that it is not closely related to the rusty-backed spinetail but rather is a sister species of the russet-mantled softtail (C. berlepschi).

Parker's spinetail is monotypic.

== Description ==
Parker's spinetail is 13 to 16 cm (5.1 to 6.3 in) long and weighs 16 to 20 g (0.56 to 0.71 oz). The sexes have the same plumage. Adults have a faint buff supercilium and lores on an otherwise dusky gray face. Their crown, back, rump, and uppertail coverts are rufous; the forecrown has narrow buff streaks. Their tail and wings are also rufous. Their throat is white, and the rest of their underparts are light brown or light brownish gray with indistinct whitish mottling. Their iris is brown or pale brown, their maxilla black, their mandible pale grayish pink, and their legs and feet olive or grayish olive. Juveniles have a duller crown than adults.

== Distribution and habitat ==
Parker's spinetail is found along the upper Amazon River and its major tributaries, from eastern Ecuador, northeastern Peru, and far northern Bolivia into western Brazil as far east as the Rio Negro. It almost exclusively inhabits early-succession vegetation on young river islands. In elevation, it is seldom found above 300 m (1,000 ft) but can reach 400 m (1,300 ft) in Ecuador.

== Behavior ==
=== Movement ===
Parker's spinetail is not a migrant, but the extent of its local movements in response to the flooding of river islands during the rainy season is not known.

=== Feeding ===
Parker's spinetail feeds on arthropods but details are lacking. It typically forages in the under- and mid-storeys of woody vegetation, and usually in pairs. It gleans its prey from bark, dead leaf clusters, and trapped debris while searching along trunks and limbs.

=== Breeding ===
Parker's spinetail is thought to be monogamous. Nothing else is known about its breeding biology.

=== Vocalization ===
The song of Parker's spinetail is "an accelerating and descending series of nasal notes that ends in a chortle, e.g. tew-tew-tew-tew-trrrrrr" and is similarly described as "an accelerating, rising-falling chatter of nasal notes: teer teew-tew'tu'tutrrr". Its calls include "a sharp, fast chut-chut" given singly or tripled and "a longer, descending chatter, tchew-tew'tu'tu.

== Status ==
The IUCN has assessed Parker's spinetail as being of Least Concern. It has a large range and an unknown population size that is believed to be stable. No immediate threats have been identified. It is considered uncommon to fairly common in Peru and fairly common in Ecuador and the rest of its range. "Human activity has little short-term direct effect on Parker's Spinetail, other than the local effects of habitat destruction. Given that this species occupies disturbed habitats, it may even benefit, locally, from human activities, such as a low level of clearing for subsistence agriculture." But changes to the Amazonian hydrology from deforestation, dam construction, or climate change might pose a longer-term threat.
