= Bathochordaeus mcnutti =

Scientific classification
- Kingdom: Animalia
- Phylum: Chordata
- Subphylum: Tunicata
- Class: Appendicularia
- Order: Copelata
- Family: Oikopleuridae
- Genus: Bathochordaeus
- Species: B. mcnutti

Binomial name
- Bathochordaeus mcnutti Sherlock, Walz, Schlining & Robison, 2017

Species of Appendicularia

Bathochordaeus mcnutti, the blue-tailed giant larvacean, is a species of larvacean in the genus Bathochordaeus within the family Oikopleuridae. It's found in the North Pacific Ocean, it is comparatively large and reaching up to 10 centimeters in length including the tail. It can be distinguished from other giant larvaceans by its bright blue tail margin.
