= Azuero howler =

Conservation status
- Critically Endangered (IUCN 3.1)

Scientific classification
- Kingdom: Animalia
- Phylum: Chordata
- Class: Mammalia
- Order: Primates
- Suborder: Haplorhini
- Infraorder: Simiiformes
- Family: Atelidae
- Genus: Alouatta
- Species: A. coibensis
- Subspecies: A. c. trabeata

Trinomial name
- Alouatta coibensis trabeata Lawrence, 1933

Subspecies of New World monkey

The Azuero howler (Alouatta coibensis trabeata) a type of monkey that is a subspecies of the Coiba Island howler A. coibensis. This subspecies is endemic to the Azuero Peninsula in Panama. The Azuero howler is distinguished primarily by its golden flanks and loins, and browner appearance on the rest of its body.

Although generally considered a subspecies of A. coibensis, there is some debate within the scientific community as to whether A. coibensis itself is a valid species. If not, A. c. trabeata would be considered subspecies of the mantled howler, A. palliata. In that case its trinomial name would be A. p. trabeata.
