= Bathochordaeus stygius =

Scientific classification
- Domain: Eukaryota
- Kingdom: Animalia
- Phylum: Chordata
- Subphylum: Tunicata
- Class: Appendicularia
- Order: Copelata
- Family: Oikopleuridae
- Genus: Bathochordaeus
- Species: B. stygius

Binomial name
- Bathochordaeus stygius Garstang, 1937

Species of Appendicularia

Bathochordaeus stygius is a species of larvacean in the genus Bathochordaeus within the family Oikopleuridae.
