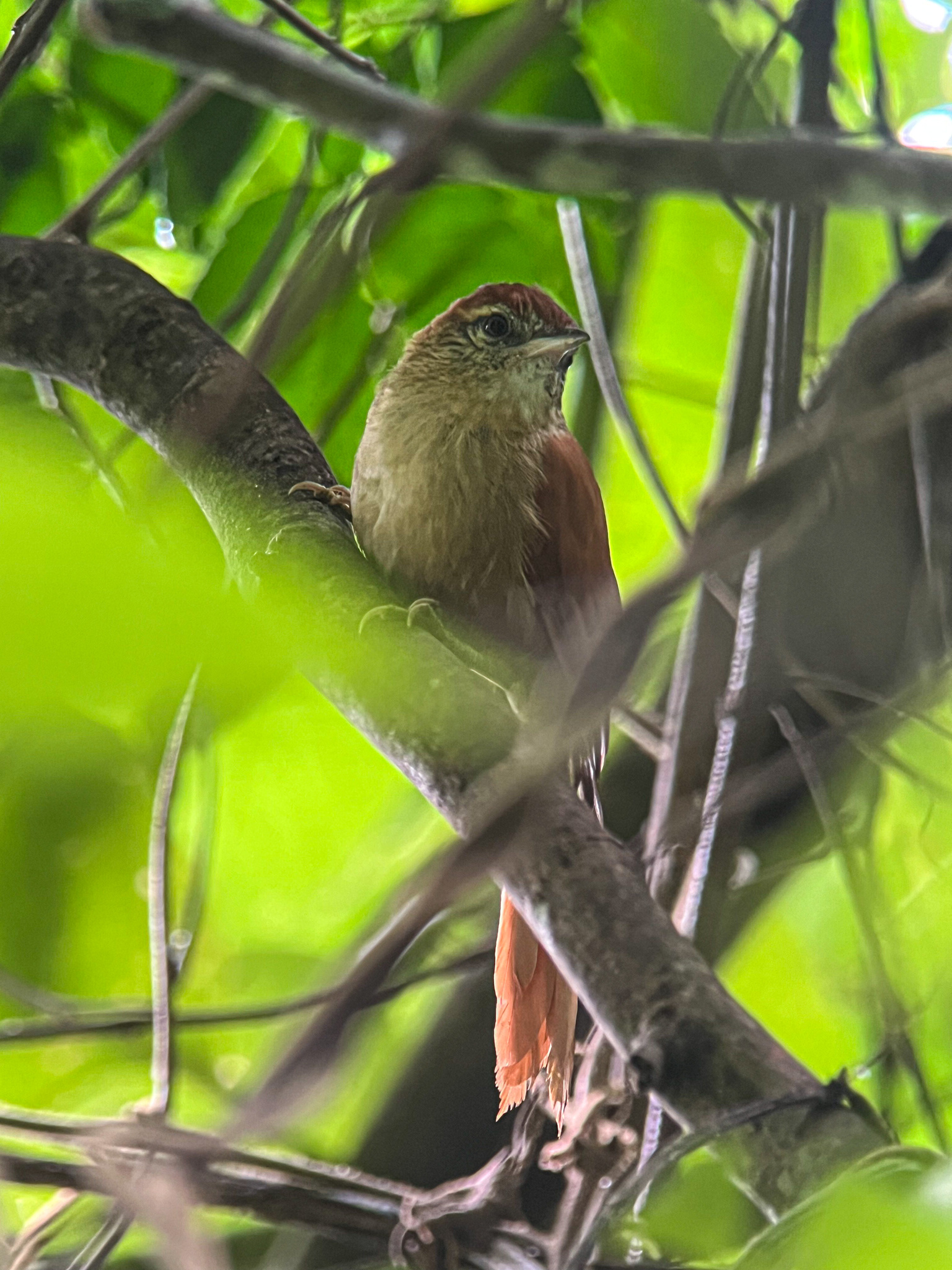

Conservation status
- Least Concern (IUCN 3.1)

Scientific classification
- Kingdom: Animalia
- Phylum: Chordata
- Class: Aves
- Order: Passeriformes
- Family: Furnariidae
- Genus: Cranioleuca
- Species: C. dissita

Binomial name
- Cranioleuca dissita Wetmore, 1957

Synonyms
- Craniolecua vulpina dissita

= Coiba spinetail =

Species of bird

The Coiba spinetail (Cranioleuca dissita) is a member of the family Furnariidae (ovenbirds) that is endemic to Coiba and Ranchería Islands, Panama.

== Taxonomy and systematics ==
The Coiba spinetail was originally described as a subspecies of the rusty-backed spinetail (C. vulpina), though the author noted that it almost warranted species status. Ridgely and Gwynne were apparently the first to treat it as a species. In 2015 the North American Classification Committee (NACC) of the American Ornithologists' Union (now the American Ornithological Society) recognized the species as separate based on morphological, auditory, behavioral, and genetic differences. The International Ornithological Committee (IOC), Clements taxonomy, and BirdLife International's Handbook of the Birds of the World followed suit. The Coiba spinetail is monotypic.

== Description ==
The Coiba spinetail is 15 to 16 cm (5.9 to 6.3 in) long. Its upperparts including the tail are russet brown, though the rump is somewhat paler. Most of the face is a dull creamy buff with a bit of gray and a pinkish buff supercilium. Its throat is white, the breast and belly white with a buff wash, and the flanks tawny.

== Distribution and habitat ==
The Coiba spinetail is found only on Coiba Island and the much smaller and adjacent Ranchería Island off the Pacific coast of western Panama. It inhabits the interior and roadside edges of tropical forest, but shuns shrubby areas, scrublands, and areas around houses. In elevation it ranges from sea level to near the summit of Coiba's highest peak, Cerro Torre (416 m (1,400 ft)).

== Behavior ==
=== Feeding ===
The Coiba spinetail is an acrobatic forager: It climbs the trunks of trees, hops among vines and small branches, hangs upside down from branches, and makes short flights between substrates. It mostly pecks at the substrates, such as the bark of trunks and limbs, moss, vines, and clusters of leaves, but also probes and gleans from them. Most foraging was observed between 7 and 10 m (23 and 33 ft) above the ground but it also occurred nearer the ground and as high as 25 m (82 ft) above it. Its diet has not been described in detail but is assumed to be arthropods like that of other spinetails.

=== Breeding ===
The Coiba spinetail's breeding season spans at least from December to July, based on the dates on which nest-building was observed. Both members of a pair build the nest, a globe-shaped structure made mostly of bark and palm fibers and lined with seed down and other soft materials. It is attached to a thin vertical branch or trunk or a cluster of vines and has an entrance hole low on the side. The clutch size is not known.

=== Vocalization ===
The Coiba spinetail's song is "2-4 short introductory notes, followed by 4-6 longer notes given rapidly at the same pitch followed by about 7 even longer notes that slow down and fall in pitch." Both sexes sing, but it appears that one sex's song is stronger and clearer than the other's. Two calls are known, a "chidididit" and a "deet-deet-dee-dididit". The first appears to be a contact call, often given during foraging or when collecting nest material.

== Status ==
The IUCN originally assessed the Coiba spinetail as Near Threatened but since 2020 as treated it as being of Least Concern. Though it has a very limited range (approximately 50,500 ha (190 sq mi)), its population is estimated to be at least 9000 mature individuals and increasing. No immediate severe threats have been identified.
