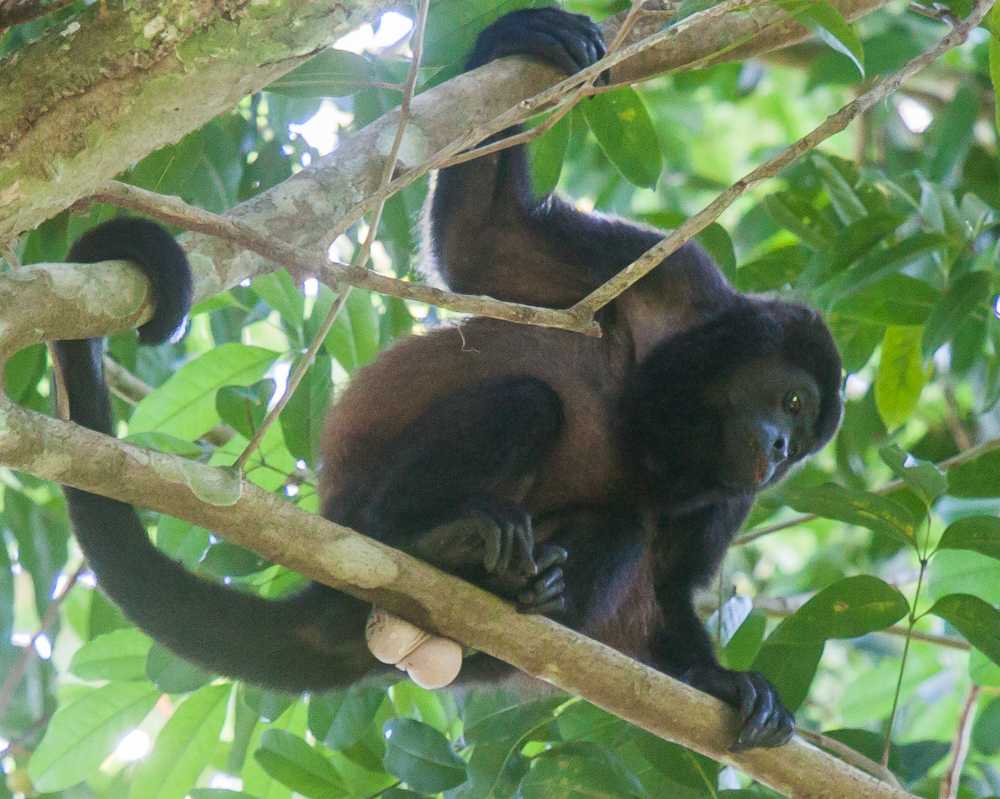

Conservation status
- Endangered (IUCN 3.1)
- CITES Appendix I

Scientific classification
- Kingdom: Animalia
- Phylum: Chordata
- Class: Mammalia
- Infraclass: Placentalia
- Order: Primates
- Family: Atelidae
- Genus: Alouatta
- Species: A. coibensis

Binomial name
- Alouatta coibensis Thomas, 1902

= Coiba Island howler =

Species of New World monkey

The Coiba Island howler (Alouatta coibensis) is a type of howler monkey, a type of New World monkey, endemic to Panama. Although the Coiba Island howler has been recognized as a separate species by a number of authorities since a 1987 study of its fingerprints, mitochondrial DNA testing found it does not differ from mantled howler populations in any significant way. A reason given for treating it as a separate species is that the dermal ridges of its hands and feet differ from those of the mantled howler.

A. c. coibensis is smaller than other Central American howler monkeys and has duller pelage than the Azuero howler, Alouatta coibensis trabeata.

On the island of Jicarón, Coiba Island howlers coexist with Panamanian white-faced capuchins (Cebus imitator). In early 2022, motion-triggered cameras operating since 2017 on Jicarón to observe capuchin tool use detected for the first time male capuchins carrying infant Coiba Island howlers on their backs while walking or smashing seeds with rocks. Further research indicated that during 2022 and 2023, at least five male capuchins abducted at least 11 infant howler monkeys and carried them on their backs. Although the capuchins did not harm the baby howlers, they were unable to properly care for or feed them, and at least four—and probably most or all—of the baby howlers died. By the time they announced their findings in May 2025, researchers had concluded that the cameras had captured a behavior that had only recently arisen as a "fashion fad" among a single population of male capuchins, and described the capuchins' behavior as "the first known documentation of a social tradition in which animals repeatedly abduct and carry infants of another species—without any clear benefit to themselves."

== Subspecies ==
Two subspecies of this howler have been recognized by those who consider it a separate species:

- Alouatta coibensis coibensis Thomas, 1902, found on Coiba Island and Jicarón, off the Pacific coast of Panama
- Azuero howler, A. c. trabeata Lawrence, 1933, endemic to the Azuero Peninsula in Panama.
