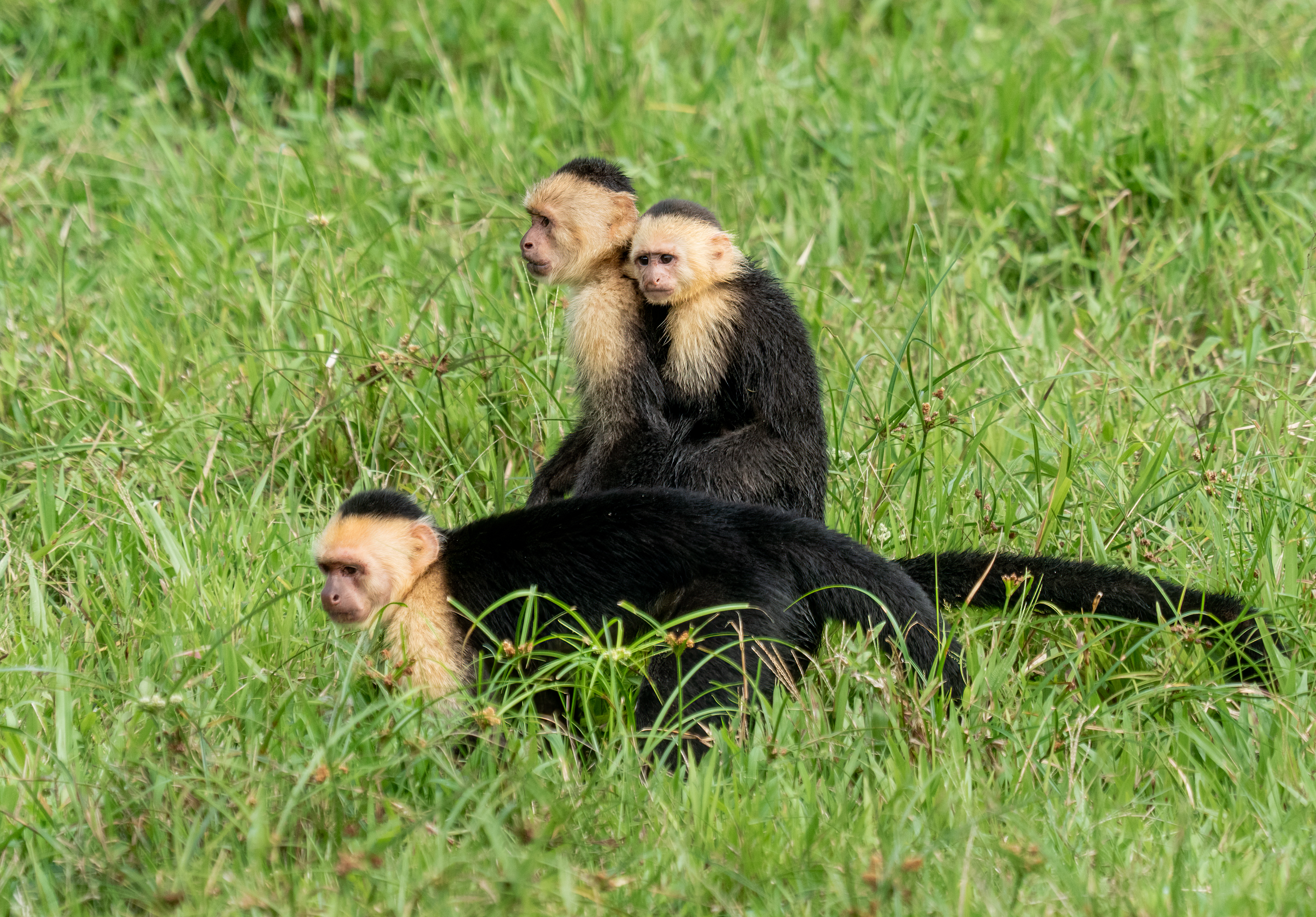

Conservation status
- Vulnerable (IUCN 3.1)

Scientific classification
- Kingdom: Animalia
- Phylum: Chordata
- Class: Mammalia
- Order: Primates
- Family: Cebidae
- Genus: Cebus
- Species: C. imitator

Binomial name
- Cebus imitator (Thomas, 1903)
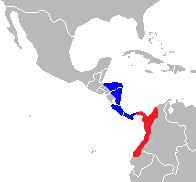
- Distribution of Cebus imitator and Cebus capucinus. Cebus imitator covers the Central American portion of the range except the easternmost portion of Panama.

= Panamanian white-faced capuchin =

Species of primate

The Panamanian white-faced capuchin (Cebus imitator), also known as the Panamanian white-headed capuchin or Central American white-faced capuchin, is a medium-sized New World monkey of the family Cebidae, subfamily Cebinae. Native to the forests of Central America, the white-faced capuchin is important to rainforest ecology for its role in dispersing seeds and pollen.

The Panamanian white-faced capuchin is versatile, living in many different types of forest, and eating many different types of food, including fruit, other plant material, invertebrates, and small vertebrates. It lives in troops that can exceed 20 animals and include both males and females. It is noted for its tool use, including rubbing plants over its body in an apparent use of herbal medicine, and also using tools as weapons and for getting to food. It is a long-lived monkey, with a maximum recorded age of over 54 years.

The white-faced capuchin is a medium-sized monkey, weighing up to 3.9 kg (8 lb 10 oz). It is mostly black, with a pink face and white on much of the front part of the body, giving it its common name. It has a distinctive prehensile tail that is often carried coiled up and is used to help support the monkey when it is feeding beneath a branch.

Panamanian white-faced capuchins are highly social, living in groups of 16 individuals on average, about three quarters of which are females. Groups consists of related females, immigrant males, and offspring. On average, females birth offspring every 27 months even though they mate throughout the year. Females tend to stay within their original group while males leave their natal group when they are four years old and change groups every four years thereafter. Both male and female capuchins exhibit different dominance behaviors within the group.

In captivity, the Panamanian white-faced capuchin has been used as a companion to the organ grinder. It is an intelligent monkey and has been portrayed as a pet by American media (for example, in the Pirates of the Caribbean film series).

== Taxonomy ==
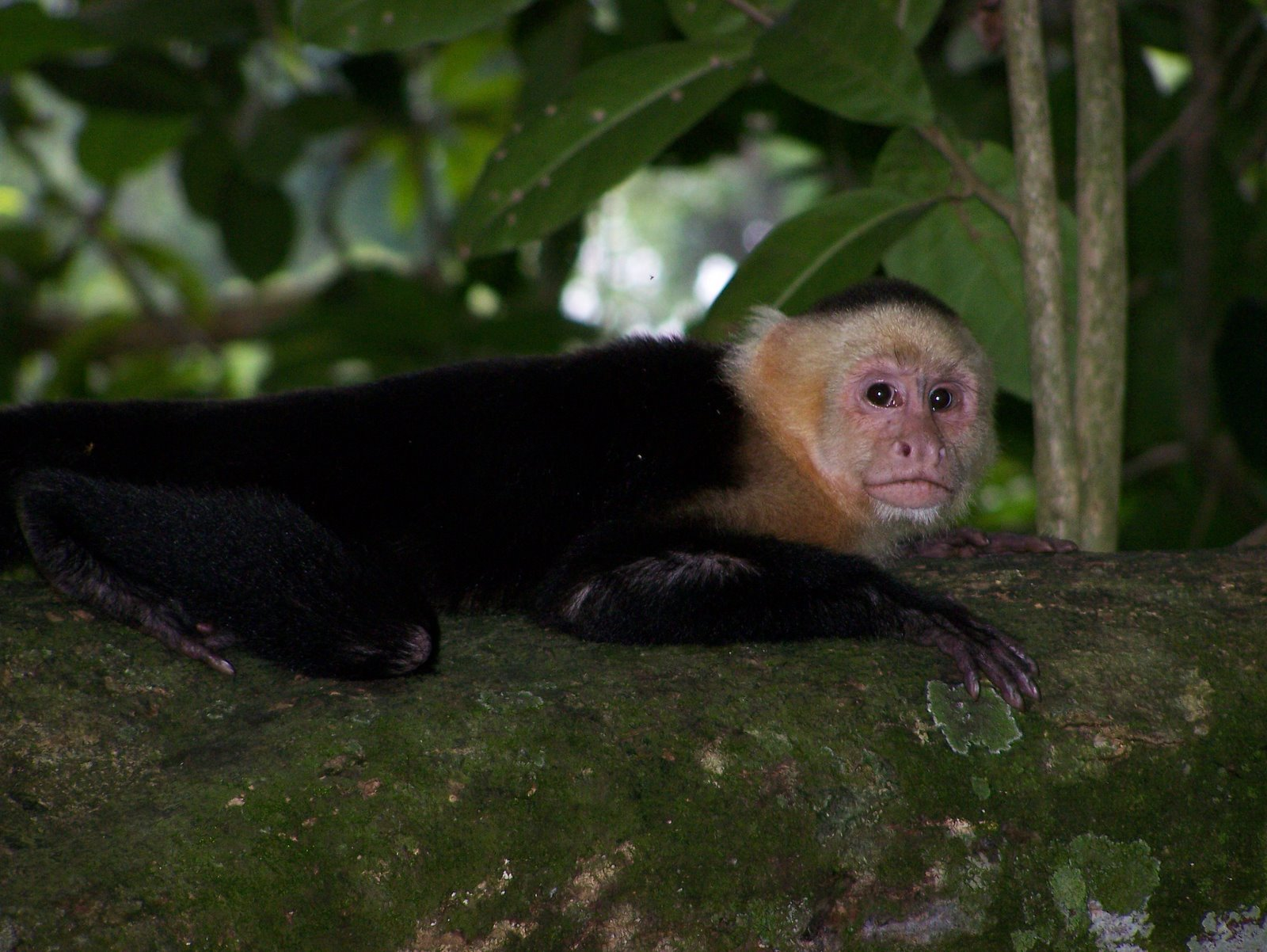
The Panamanian white-faced capuchin was previously considered a subspecies of the Colombian white-headed capuchin, Cebus capucinus imitator.

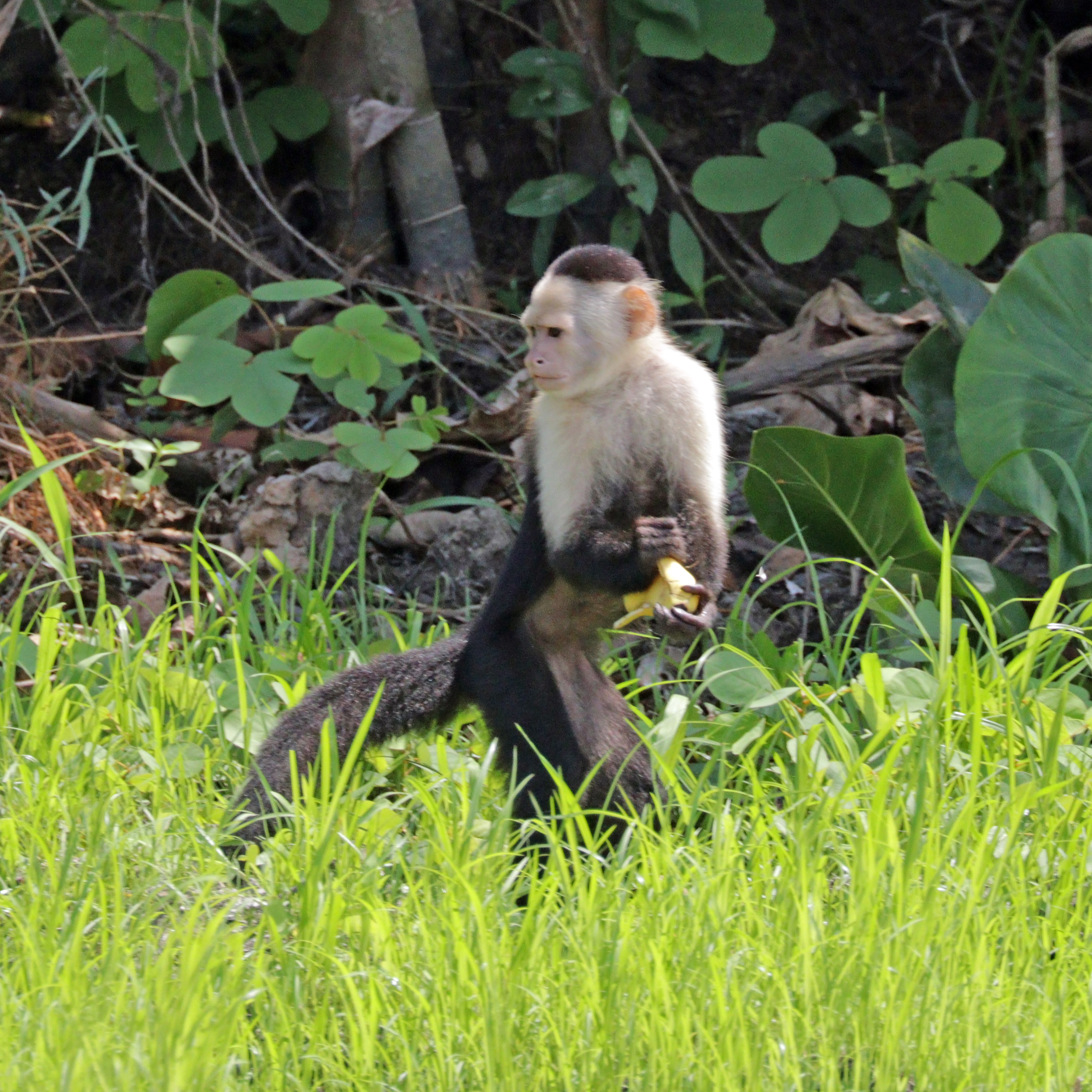
in Gatun Lake, Panama

The Panamanian white-faced capuchin is a member of the family Cebidae, the family of New World monkeys containing capuchin monkeys and squirrel monkeys. Until the 21st century, the Panamanian white-faced capuchin was considered conspecific with Cebus capucinus, the Colombian white-faced capuchin, but as a separate subspecies, C. capucinus imitator. Some primatologists continue to consider the Panamanian and Colombian white-faced capuchins as a single species. The Panamanian monkey is a member of the C. capucinus species group within the genus Cebus, which also includes the Colombian white-faced capuchin, white-fronted capuchin, the weeper capuchin and the Kaapori capuchin. This genus is also referred to as "gracile" capuchins.

In 2012 a study by Boubli, et al. demonstrated that C. imitator and C. capucinus split up to 2 million years ago. Boubli's study also indicated that the Honduran white-faced capuchins, which had previously been considered a to be a possible separate subspecies, C. capucinus limitaneus, was not genetically distinct from the Panamanian white-faced capuchin.

The Panamanian white-faced capuchin is among the most well-studied capuchin monkey species. Even though many previous studies were performed using the scientific name C. capucinus, as of 2014 there had been no field studies of the Colombian white-faced capuchin, so all these studies were of the Panamanian white-faced capuchin.

== Physical description ==
Like other monkeys in the genus Cebus, the Panamanian white-faced capuchin is named after the order of Capuchin friars – the cowls of these friars closely resemble the monkey's head coloration. The Panamanian white-faced capuchin has mostly black fur, with white to yellow like fur on the neck, throat, chest, shoulders, and upper arms. The face is pink or a white-cream color and may have identifying marks such as dark brows or dark fur patches. An area of black fur on the crown of the head is distinctive. It has a prehensile tail that is often held coiled, giving the white-faced capuchins the nickname "ringtail".

Adults reach a length of between 335 and 453 mm (13 1/4 and 17 7/8 in), excluding tail, and a weight of up to 3.9 kg (8 lb 10 oz). The tail is longer than the body, at up to 551 mm (21 3/4 in) in length. Males are about 27% larger than females. The brain of a white-faced capuchin is about 79.2 g (2 13/16 oz), which is larger than that of several larger monkey species, such as the mantled howler.

The Panamanian white-faced capuchin is similar to the Colombian white-faced capuchin in appearance, except that the female Panamanian white-faced capuchins have brownish or grayish elongated frontal tufts, which provide a contrast to the pure white cheeks and throat.

== Behavior ==
=== Social structure ===
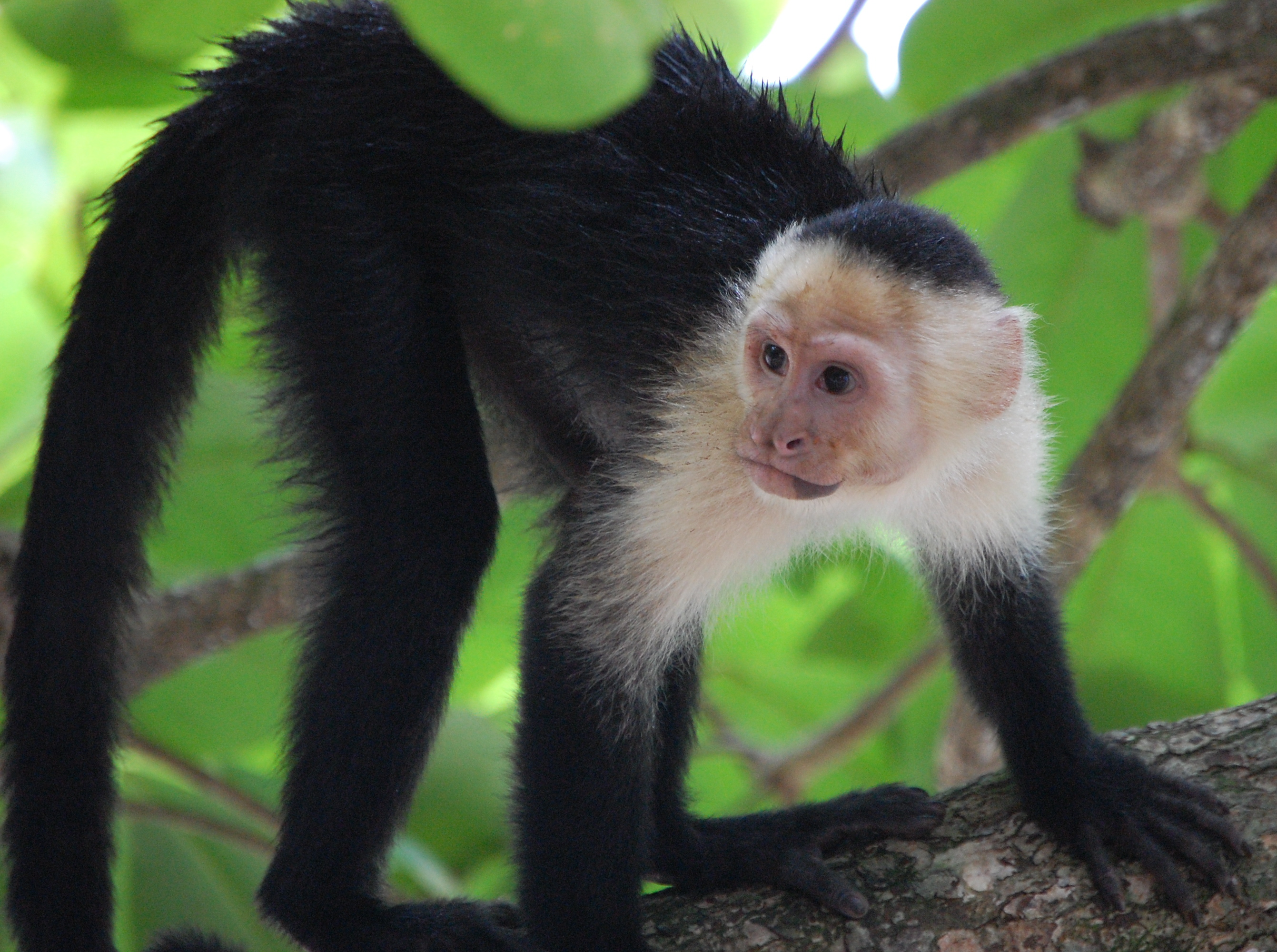
Walking on four limbs

The Panamanian white-faced capuchin is a diurnal and arboreal animal. However, it does come down to the ground more often than many other New World monkeys. It moves primarily by walking on all four limbs. It lives in troops, or groups, of up to 40 monkeys (mean 16, range 4–40) and has a male/female adult sex ratio of 0.71 on average (range 0.54–0.88). With rare exceptions, females spend their entire lives with their female kin. Males migrate to new social groups multiple times during the course of their lifetimes, migrating for the first time between 20 months and 11 years of age. The median age of migration in the Santa Rosa population is 4.5 years. Males sometimes migrate alone, but more often they migrate in the company of other males who are often their kin. One of the unusual features of the kinship structure of the Panamanian white-faced capuchin, relative to other primate species, is the high degree of relatedness within groups that results from the long tenures of alpha males who sire most of the offspring. Alpha males have been known to keep their positions as long as 17 years in this species and this puts them in the unusual position of being available to sire the offspring of their daughters and granddaughters, who produce their first offspring at about 6–7 years of age. Typically, however, alpha males do not breed with their own daughters, even though they do sire virtually all offspring produced by females unrelated to them. Those subordinate males who are allies of the alpha male in group defense are the males who sire the offspring of the alpha male's daughters. The high degree to which alpha males monopolize matings results in an unusually large number of paternal half-siblings and full siblings in this species relative to other primate species.

Kinship is an important organizing factor in the structuring of female-female social relationships. Particularly in larger groups, females preferentially associate with, groom, and provide coalitionary support to their matrilineally related female kin. They do not exhibit a similar preference for their paternal half sisters, which may mean that they only are capable of recognizing kinship through the maternal line. Dominance rank is also an important organizing factor, with females more often grooming and associating with females who are closer to them in the dominance hierarchy. Female-female dyads groom far more than male-female and male-male dyads. Coalitionary aggression is common both among males and females, and capuchins seem to have an excellent understanding of the alliance structure in their group. For example, when capuchins are fighting, they sensibly recruit aid from someone who is both higher ranking than they are and also better friends with themselves than with their opponent.

Female capuchins have linear dominance hierarchies. In contrast to many Old World monkeys such as macaques, in which females socially inherit the rank just below their mothers and just above their next oldest sisters, capuchins do not have a highly predictable ranking within their matrilines. Males are typically dominant to females. The alpha male is always easy to discern, but there are sometimes ambiguous rankings among subordinate males. Male-male relationships are tense, and affiliation between males is typically expressed by resting in contact, playing, or non-conceptive sex rather than by grooming. Males cooperate in coalitions against potential predators, and also in defense of the group against other males. Occasionally male coalitionary aggression becomes so violent that males are killed, particularly if they are encountered roaming the forest unaccompanied by allies. Because aggression from other male capuchins is the leading cause of death (aside from poaching by humans, where there is contact between humans and capuchins), male allies are critical for self-defense during migration, and to assist in taking over other groups. Male emigration to a new troop typically occurs about every 4 years, so most males are in constant danger of having to defend themselves against other groups of males.

Immigrating males often kill young infants when they take over a group. Females band together to defend their infants from infanticidal males, but they rarely succeed in saving their infants. Because infants inhibit their mothers from ovulating by nursing frequently, males are able to bring females into estrus earlier by killing the infants and thereby terminating nursing; this has the effect of increasing their breeding opportunities. Females do often mate with the killers of their infants, and with time, they typically become as supportive of the new alpha male as they had been of the previous one. The alpha male helps defend females from subordinate males within the group as well as from infanticidal males from other groups.

=== Interactions between groups ===
Panamanian white-faced capuchin troops occupy home ranges of between 32 and 86 hectares (79 and 213 acres). They travel between 1 and 3 km (1/2 and 1 3/4 mi) daily, averaging 2 km (1 1/4 mi) per day. Although they engage in activity that has been described as "territorial", more recent research indicates that white-faced capuchin troops tend to behave aggressively to other white-faced capuchin troops regardless of where they meet, and the aggression is not necessarily intended to exclude the other troops from a specific home range.

Home ranges overlap extensively, so groups are not territorial in the strictest sense of the word. Perhaps because of the intensity of male-male competition and the threat of infanticide, interactions between groups are typically hostile: the males display aggressively toward one another and sometimes engage in physical aggression (even killing an opponent), while females grab their infants and run. Typically, males are the primary participants in aggressive intergroup encounters, and it seems likely that males are defending access to the females in their groups. Alpha males, who have the largest reproductive stake in the group, participate at a higher rate than subordinate males. Groups with more males have an advantage over groups with fewer males, but the location of the encounter within the home range matters as well; smaller groups defeat larger groups when the contest occurs in the core or center area of the smaller group's home range.

=== Interspecific interactions ===
The Panamanian white-faced capuchin sometimes interacts with other sympatric monkey species. Panamanian white-faced capuchins sometimes travel with and even groom Geoffroy's spider monkeys. However, aggressive interactions between the capuchins and spider monkeys also occur. Interactions between the Panamanian white-faced capuchin and mantled howler are infrequent, and sometimes result in the capuchins threatening the larger howlers. However, affiliative associations between the capuchins and howlers do sometimes occur, mostly involving juveniles playing together.

Although South American capuchin species often travel with and feed together with squirrel monkeys, the Panamanian white-faced capuchin only rarely associates with the Central American squirrel monkey. This appears to be related to the patchier, more dispersed distribution of food resources in Central America and the fact that there is less dietary overlap between the Central American squirrel monkey and the white-faced capuchin than between their South American counterparts. Therefore, there is less benefit to the Central American squirrel monkey in associating with the Panamanian white-faced capuchin in order to exploit the capuchin's knowledge of food resource distribution. In addition, compared to their South American counterparts, male Panamanian white-headed capuchins are relatively more alert to rival males than to predators, reducing the predator detection benefits that the Central American squirrel monkey receives from associating with the Panamanian white-faced capuchin compared to its South American counterparts. Since the squirrel monkeys generally initiate interactions with the capuchins in South America, the fact that similar associations would impose higher foraging costs and impart fewer predator detection benefits to the Central American squirrel monkey leads to fewer associations with the Panamanian white-faced capuchin.

On the island of Jicarón, Panamanian white-faced capuchins coexist with Coiba Island howler monkeys (Alouatta coibensis coibensis). In early 2022, motion-triggered cameras detected male capuchins carrying infant howlers on their backs while walking or smashing seeds with rocks. Further research indicated that during 2022 and 2023, at least five male capuchins abducted at least 11 infant howler monkeys and carried them on their backs. The capuchins were unable to properly care for or feed the infants, and at least four—and probably most or all—of the baby howlers died. By the time they announced their findings in May 2025, researchers had concluded that the cameras had captured a rare behavior that had arisen as a "fashion fad" among a single population of male capuchins, and described the capuchins' behavior as "the first known documentation of a social tradition in which animals repeatedly abduct and carry infants of another species—without any clear benefit to themselves."

Several non-primate animal species tend to follow troops of white-faced monkeys or are otherwise attracted by their presence. White-lipped peccaries and agoutis are attracted by feeding white-faced capuchins, looking for fruit that the capuchins drop. Several species of bird are also known to follow Panmanian white-faced capuchins looking for food. These include the double-toothed kite, the white hawk and the sharp-shinned hawk.

=== Diet ===
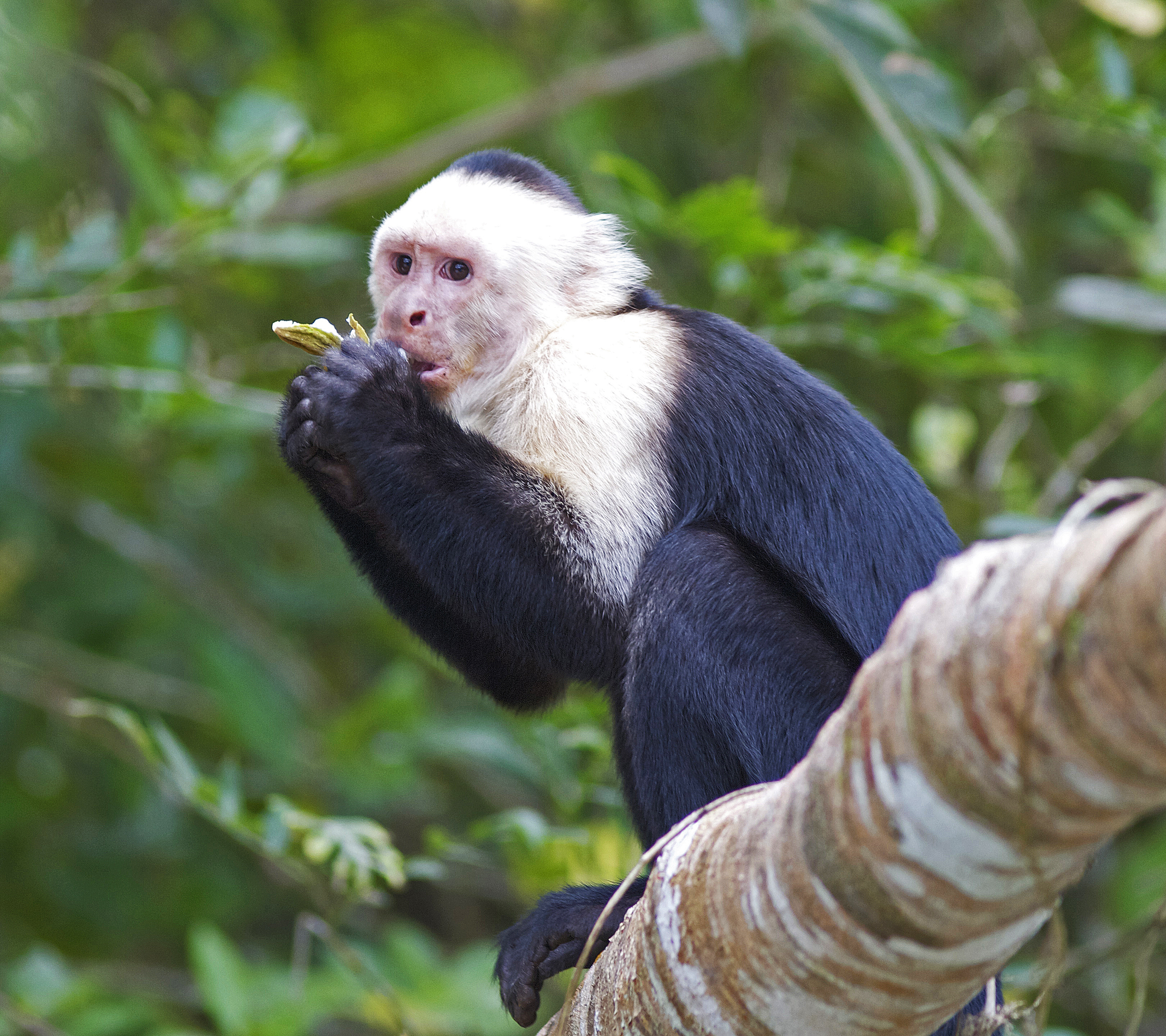
White-faced capuchin eating a wild banana along the Frío River, Costa Rica

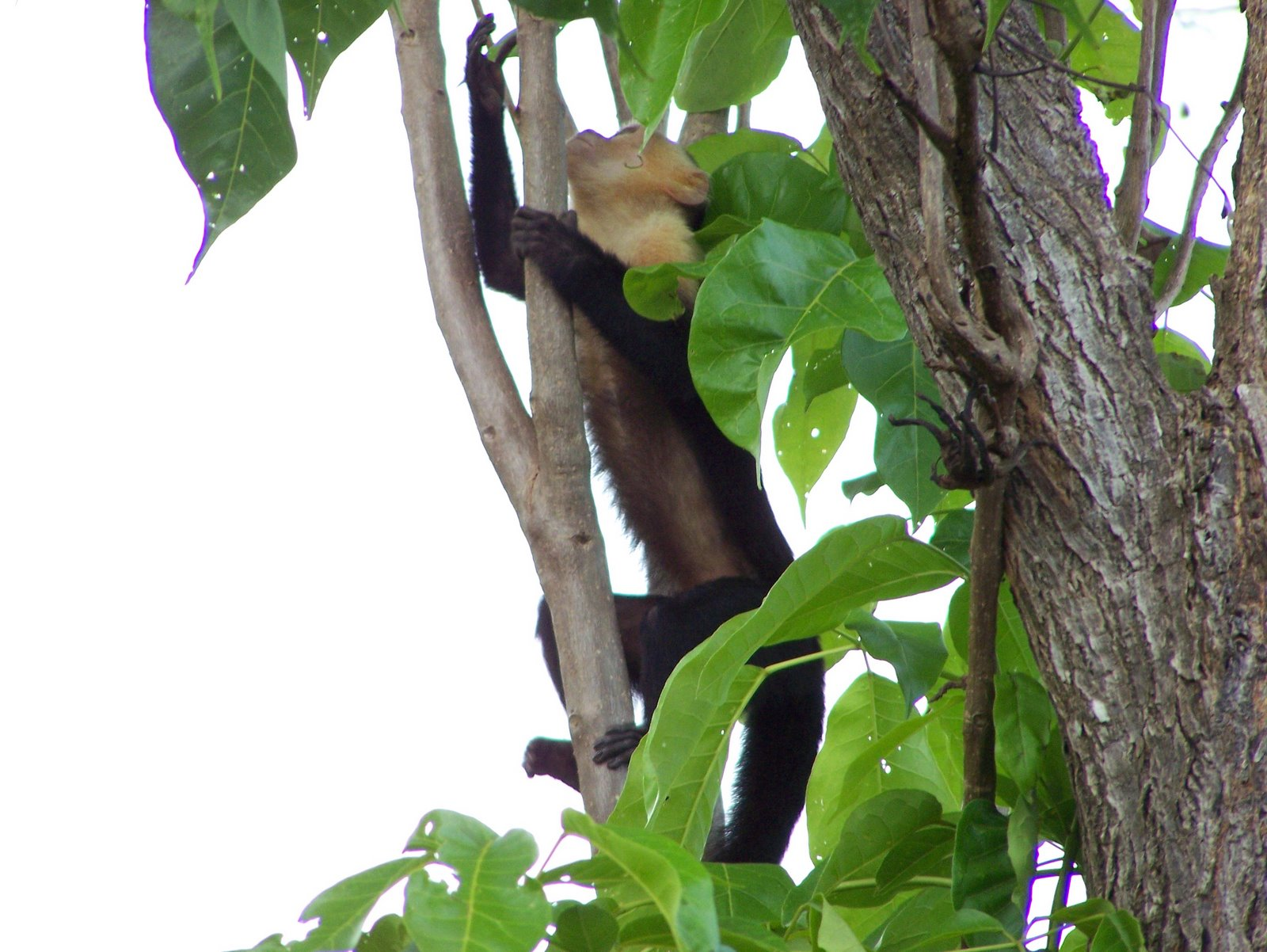
Foraging in the trees

The Panamanian white-faced capuchin is an omnivore. Its primary foods are fruit and insects. It forages at all levels of the forest, including the ground. Methods for finding food include stripping bark off of trees, searching through leaf litter, breaking dead tree branches, rolling over rocks, and using stones as anvils to crack hard fruits. Its prehensile tail assists with feeding, helping support the monkey when foraging for food below the branches.

Fruit can make up between 50% and 67% or more of the capuchin's diet. In one study in Panama, white-faced capuchins ate 95 different fruit species. Among its favorite fruits are figs from the family Moraceae, mangos and related fruits from the family Anacardiaceae, the bean-like fruits from the family Leguminosae and fruits from the family Rubiaceae. It will also eat fruits from Euphorbiaceae such as Mexican jumping bean Sebastiania pavoniana. It generally only eats ripe fruit, testing for ripeness by smelling, tasting and prodding the fruit. It typically eats only the pulp and juice, spitting out the seeds and fibers. Other plant matter eaten includes flowers, young leaves, seeds of certain plants, and bromeliads. It also uses the bromeliads as a water source, drinking the water that gets trapped inside. In Carara National Park the capuchins have a varied diet in addition to the above of banana fruits and flowers, heliconia seeds, huevos de caballo fruits and anacardiaceae stems.

Insect prey eaten includes beetle larvae, butterfly and moth caterpillars, ants, wasps, and ant and wasp larvae. It also eats larger prey, such as birds, bird eggs, frogs, lizards, crabs, mollusks and small mammals. The population in Guanacaste, Costa Rica, in particular is noted for hunting squirrels, magpies, white-crowned parrots and baby coatis. The amount of vertebrate prey eaten varies by troop. Even neighboring troops can show significant differences in their diets.

The diet can vary between the rainy and dry season. For example, in Guanacaste, Costa Rica, the Panamanian white-faced capuchin can eat a wide variety of fruits as well as caterpillars in the early rainy season (June to November). But during the dry season, only figs and a few other types of fruit are available. During the dry season, chitinous insects, ant and wasp larvae and vertebrates become a particularly important part of the Panamanian white-faced capuchin's diet. Access to water can also become an issue during the dry season. The Panamanian white-faced capuchin likes to drink daily, so in forests where water holes dry up during the dry season, there can be competition between troops over access to the remaining water holes.

=== Tool use ===
Capuchins are considered among the most intelligent of the New World monkeys; they have been the subject of many studies on behaviour and intelligence. The capuchins' intelligence is thought to be an adaptation to support their feeding habits; they rely on ephemeral food sources which may be hard to find. In one particular study conducted in 2007, capuchins were found to be among the ten most intelligent primates, second to spider monkeys among New World monkeys.

The use of stone tools is a marked difference between the gracile capuchins of the genus Cebus and the robust capuchins of the genus Sapajus. Although widespread in robust capuchins, only one case of habitual stone tool use has been reported by gracile capuchins. One population of Panamanian white-faced capuchins found in Coiba National Park in Panama has been observed using hammerstones and anvils to process fruits from Terminalia catappa, Bactris major, and Cocos nucifera (coconuts) and invertebrates such as nerite snails, hermit crabs, and Halloween crabs.

The Panamanian white-faced capuchin is known to rub parts of certain plants into their hair. Plants used in this manner include citrus fruits, vines of the genera Piper and Clematis, monkey comb (genus Sloanea), dumb cane and custard apple. Ants and millipedes are also used in this way. It is not definitively known what this rubbing is for, but this may deter parasites such as ticks and insects, or it may serve as a fungicide or bactericide or anti-inflammatory agent. Alternatively, it may be a form of scent marking. The Panamanian white-faced capuchin also uses tools in other ways. It has been known to beat snakes with sticks in order to protect itself or to get the snake to release an infant, and it sometimes uses sticks as probes to explore openings. In captivity, it has been known to use tools to get to food or to defend itself, and in one case a white-faced capuchin used a squirrel monkey as a projectile, hurling it at a human observer.

The Panamanian white-faced capuchin's intelligence and ability to use tools allows it to be trained to assist paraplegics. Other species of capuchin monkeys are also trained in this manner. Panamanian white-faced capuchins can also be trained for roles on television and movies, such as Marcel on the television series Friends. They were also traditionally used as organ grinder monkeys.

=== Communication ===
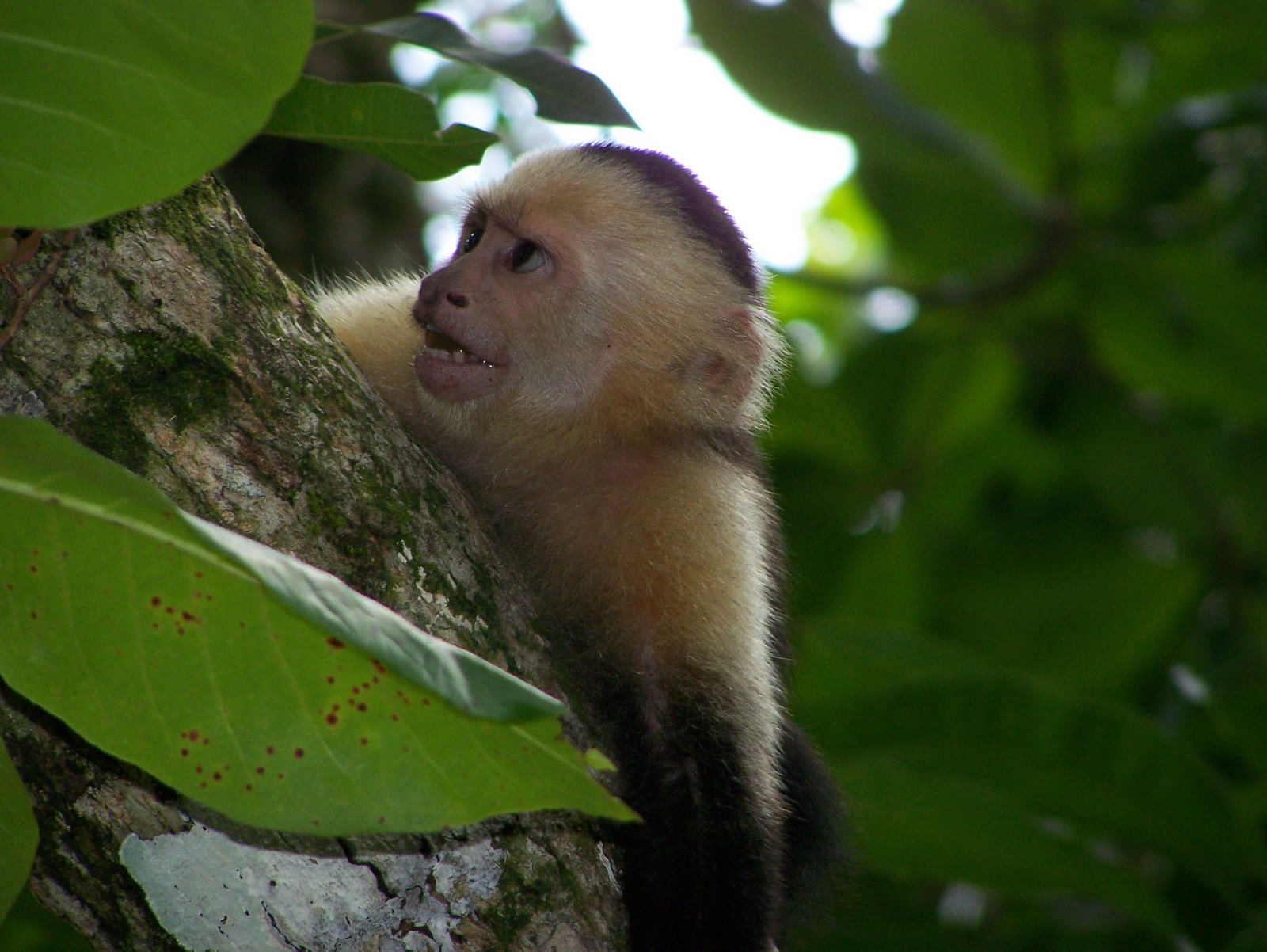
Facial expression

The Panamanian white-faced capuchin is noisy. Loud calls, such as barks and coughs, are used to communicate threat warnings, and softer calls, such as squeals, are used in intimate discourse. Different types of threats, such as a threat from a terrestrial animal versus a threat from a bird, invoke different vocalizations. Facial expressions and scent are also important to communication. It sometimes engages in a practice known as "urine washing", in which the monkey rubs urine on its feet. The exact purpose of this practice is unknown, but it may be a form of olfactory signal.

== Reproduction ==
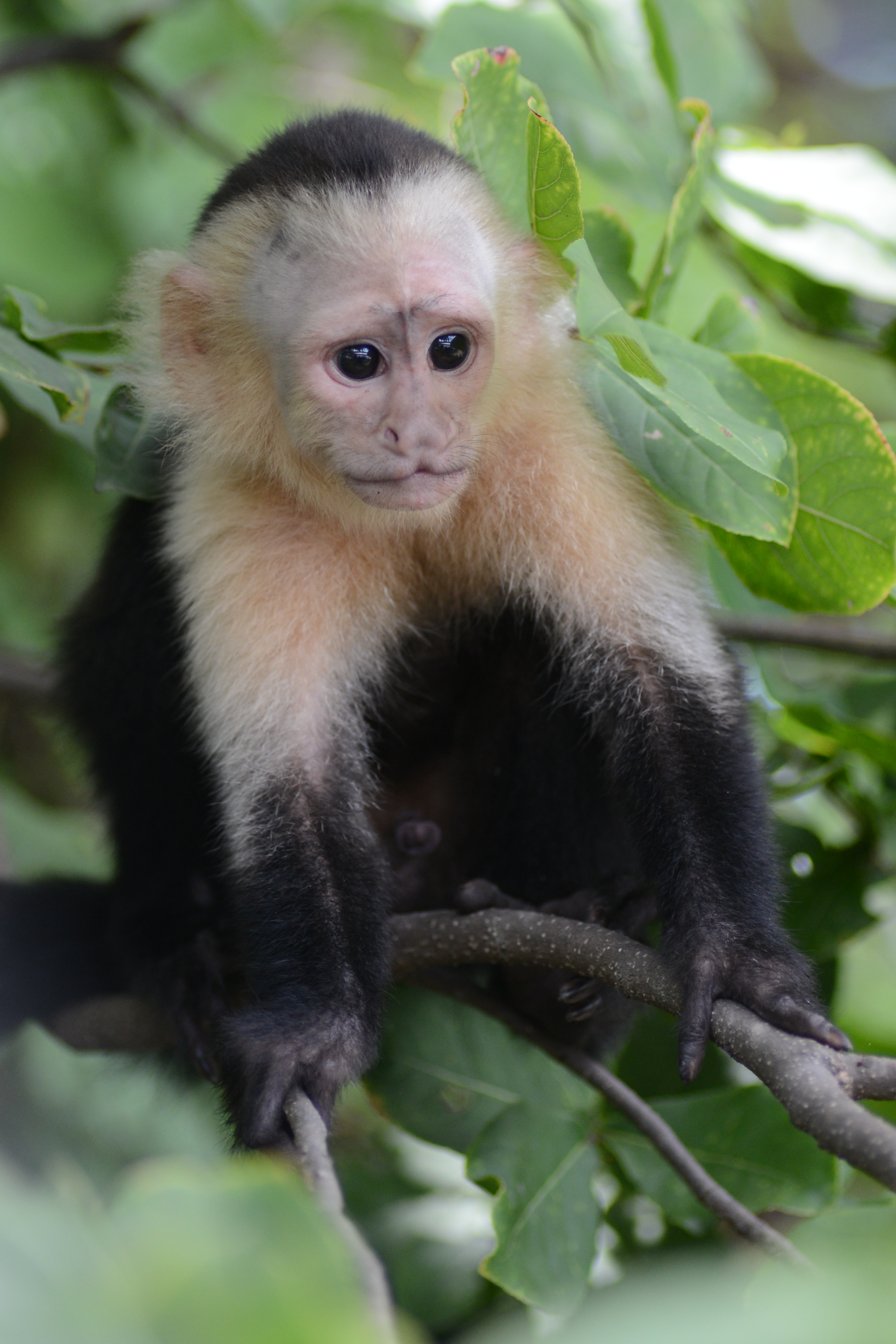
Juvenile in Palo Verde National Park, Costa Rica

The Panamanian white-faced capuchin uses a polygamous mating system in which a male may mate with multiple females. Although the dominant male does not monopolize breeding, studies have shown that the dominant male does tend to father most of the young. Although a female may mate with several males, the dominant male may be more likely to copulate when the female is at peak fertility. Nonetheless, there is evidence that dominant males do tend to avoid breeding with their own daughters who are members of the troop. Such avoidance is rare among New World primates.

Copulation takes about 2 minutes, and the gestation period is 5 to 6 months. Usually a single young is born, but twins occur occasionally. Most births occur during the dry season from December to April. The infant is carried across its mother's back for about 6 weeks. After about 4 to 5 weeks it can stray from its mother for brief periods and by about 3 months it can move around independently, although some infants will be mostly independent earlier. Weaning occurs between 6 and 12 months. While the mother rests, the young spends most of its time foraging or playing, either on its own or with other juveniles. Capuchins engage in high levels of alloparenting, in which monkeys other than the mother help care for the infant. Infants are carried by alloparents most often between 4 and 6 weeks in age. Males as well as females engage in alloparenting.

Like other capuchin species, the Panamanian white-faced capuchin matures slowly. Sexual maturity can be reached at 3 years. But on average, females give birth for the first time at 7 years old and give birth every 26 months thereafter. Males attain reproductive maturity at 10 years old. The Panamanian white-faced capuchin has a long life span given its size. The maximum recorded life span in captivity is over 54 years.

== Distribution and habitat ==
The Panamanian white-faced capuchin is found in much of Central America. In Central America, its range includes much of Honduras, Nicaragua, Costa Rica and Panama. It has also been reported to occur in eastern Guatemala and southern Belize, but these reports are unconfirmed. It is among the most commonly seen monkeys in Central America's national parks, such as Manuel Antonio National Park, Corcovado National Park, Santa Rosa National Park and Soberania National Park. It appears on the reverse side of the Costa Rican 5,000 colón note.

While the white-faced capuchin is very common in Costa Rica and Panama, the monkey has been largely extirpated from Honduras and much of Nicaragua. Many Honduran capuchins were captured and relocated to the island of Roatán, and many Nicaraguan capuchins were captured and relocated to the island of Ometepe. In Nicaragua, wild capuchins may still be easily spotted in regions around Masaya, as well as around Bluefields and other locations around the South Caribbean coast. They are seen, in the wild, daily by visitors who climb one of the volcanoes on Ometepe Island.

It is found in many different types of forest, including mature and secondary forests, and including evergreen and deciduous forests, dry and moist forests, and mangrove and montane forests. However, it appears to prefer primary or advanced secondary forests. Also, higher densities of white-faced capuchins are found in older areas of forest and in areas containing evergreen forest, as well as areas with more water availability during the dry season.

== Conservation status ==
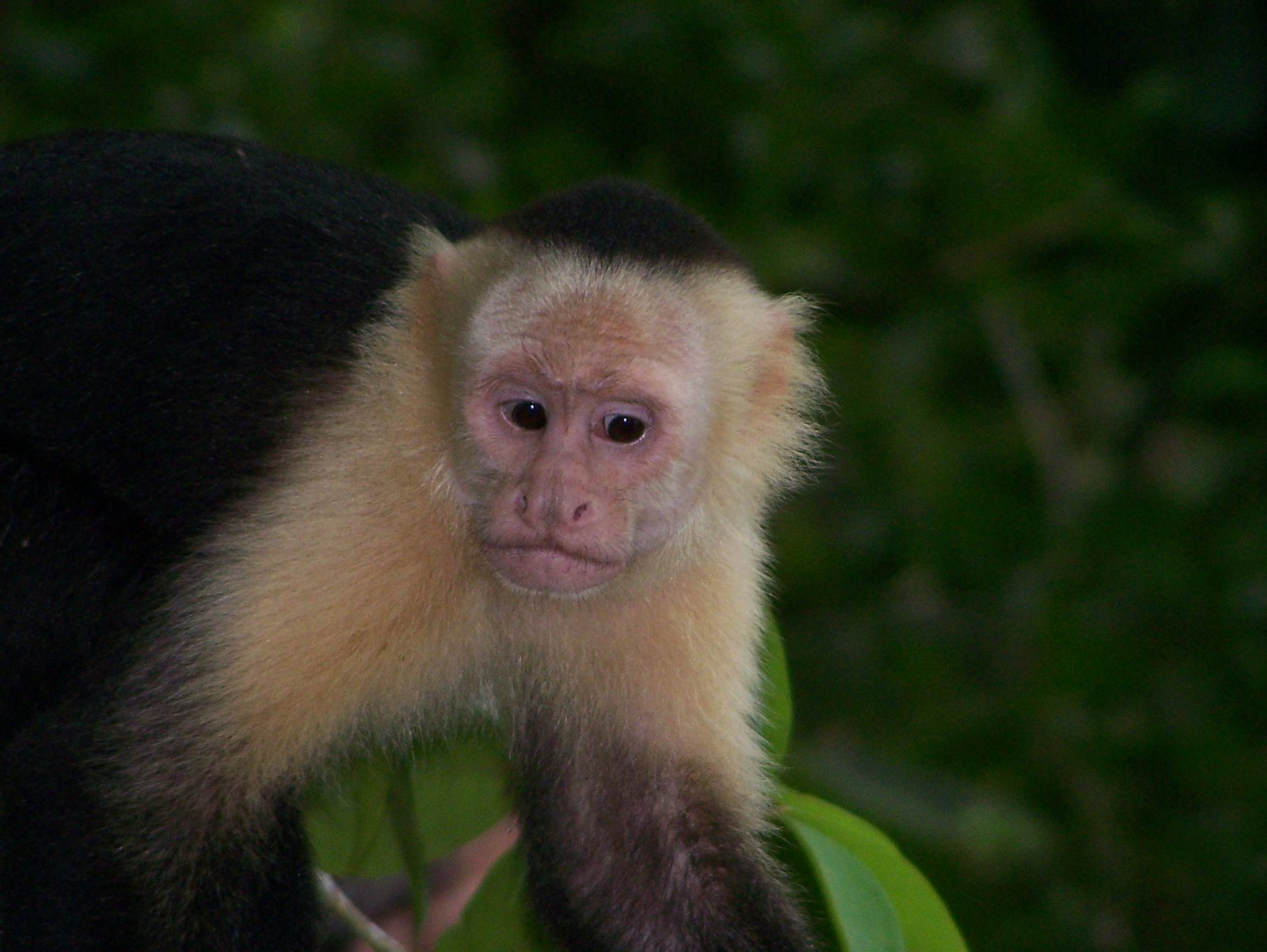
In Manuel Antonio National Park, Costa Rica

The Panamanian white-faced capuchin is regarded as vulnerable from a conservation standpoint by IUCN. It is threatened by deforestation, hunting for pet trade and sometimes for bushmeat and by the fact that farmers sometimes attack them as potential threats. However, deforestation may also impact its main predator, the harpy eagle, more than it directly impacts the Panamanian white-faced capuchin, and so on a net basis deforestation may not be as harmful to the capuchin's status. The Panamanian white-faced capuchin can adapt to forest fragmentation better than other species due to its ability to live in a wide variety of forest types and exploit a wide variety of food sources. The Panamanian white-faced capuchin is important to its ecosystems as a seed and pollen disperser. It also impacts the ecosystem by eating insects that act as pests to certain trees, by pruning certain trees, such as Gustavia superba and Bursera simaruba, causing them to generate more branches and possibly additional fruit, and by accelerating germination of certain seeds when they pass through the capuchin's digestive tract. In addition, the Panamanian white-faced capuchin sometimes kills Vachellia collinsii plants when it rips through the plant's branches to get to resident ant colonies.
