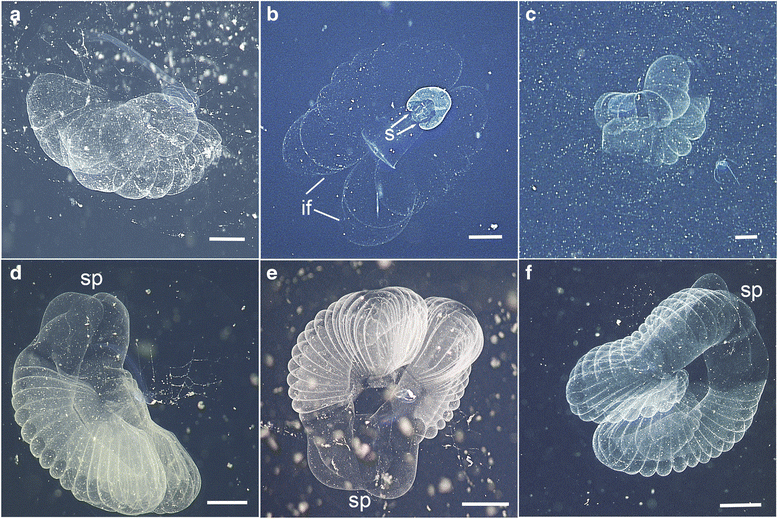
- Bathochordaeus charon (A to C) and B. stygius (E to F)

Scientific classification
- Kingdom: Animalia
- Phylum: Chordata
- Subphylum: Tunicata
- Class: Appendicularia
- Order: Copelata
- Family: Oikopleuridae
- Subfamily: Bathochordaeinae
- Genus: Bathochordaeus; Chun, 1900

Species
- Bathochordaeus charon Chun, 1900; Bathochordaeus mcnutti Sherlock, Walz, Schlining & Robison, 2017; Bathochordaeus stygius Garstang, 1937

= Bathochordaeus =

Genus of tunicates

Bathochordaeus, the giant larvaceans, is a genus of larvacean tunicates in the family Oikopleuridae. They are free-swimming filter-feeding marine animals that build mucus bubbles. They eat tiny particles of dead or drifting organic material that float through the water column, which contribute to the oceanic carbon cycle and the accelerated transfer of carbon to the deep sea.

== Description ==
They are much larger than other genera of larvaceans, ranging from 3 to 10 centimeters in total length, with houses reaching more than 1 meter in diameter.

== Distribution ==
Giant larvaceans are widespread through the planet's oceans, being found in the North and South Pacific Ocean, the North and South Atlantic Ocean, and the Indian Ocean. Three species have been described, Bathochordaeus charon, B. mcnutti and B. stygius, all of them found in Monterey Bay.
