= Coiba =

Pacific island of Panama

Coiba National Park
- IUCN category II (national park)
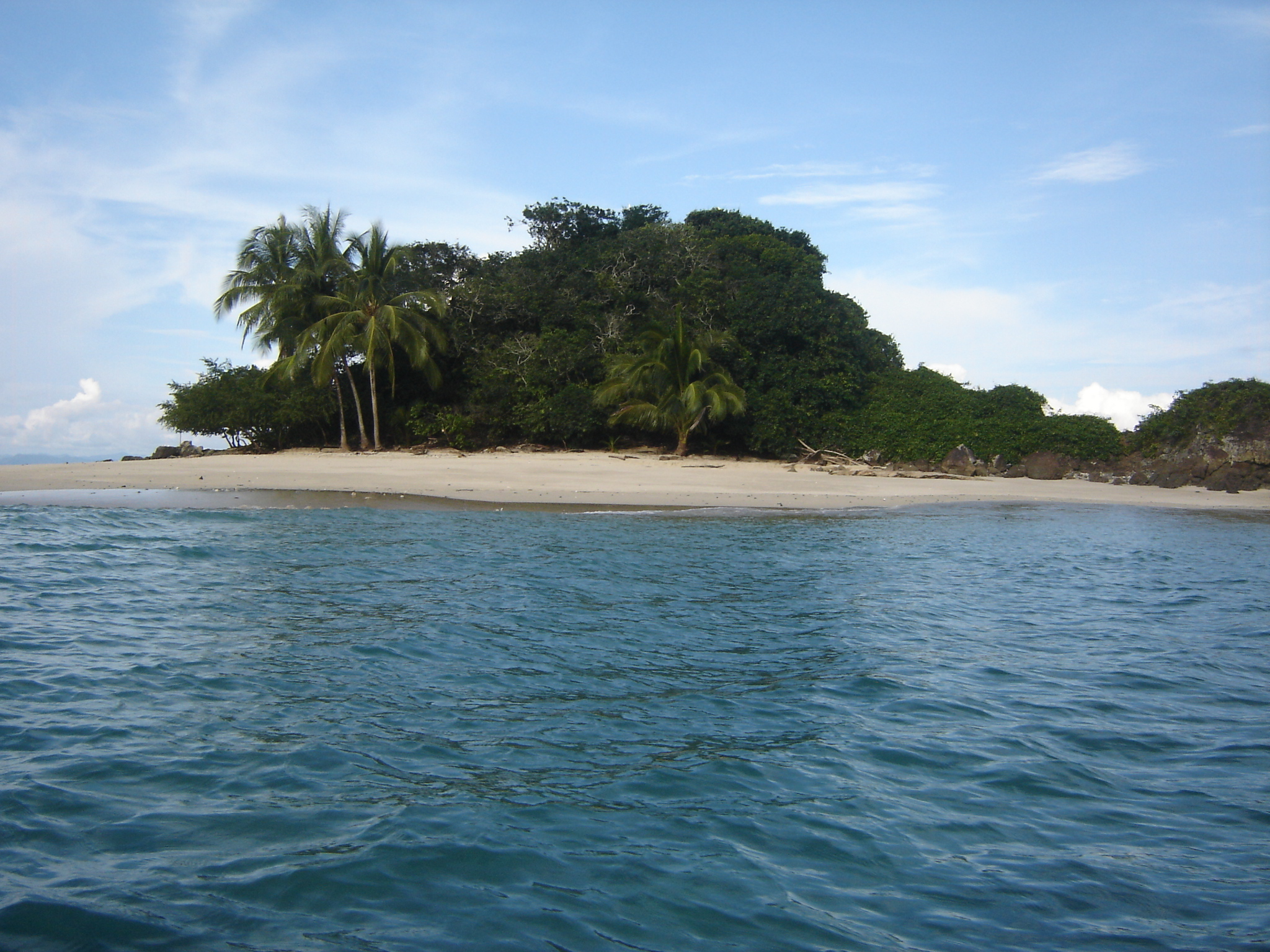
- Isla Granito de Oro, Coiba National Park

- Location within Panama
- Location: Veraguas, Panama
- Coordinates: 7.48°N 81.79°W
- Area: 494 km^{2} (191 sq mi)
- Established: 1992

UNESCO World Heritage Site
- Official name: Coiba National Park and its Special Zone of Marine Protection
- Type: Natural
- Criteria: ix, x
- Designated: 2005 (29th session)
- Reference no.: 1138rev
- State Party: Panama
- Region: Latin America and the Caribbean

Coiba (Spanish pronunciation: [ˈkojβa]) is the largest island in Central America, with an area of 494 km^{2} (191 sq mi), off the Pacific coast of the Panamanian province of Veraguas. It is part of the Montijo District of that province.

== History ==
Coiba separated from continental Panama between 12,000 and 18,000 years ago when sea levels rose. Plants and animals on the new island became isolated from mainland populations and over the millennia most animals have diverged in appearance and behaviour from their mainland counterparts. The island is home to many endemic subspecies, including the Coiba Island howler monkey, and the Coiba spinetail.

In 1919, a penal colony was built on the island and during the years that Panama was under the dictatorships of Omar Torrijos and Manuel Noriega, the prison on Coiba was a feared place with a reputation for brutal conditions, extreme torture, executions and political murders. Nobody knows exactly how many people were killed in the prison during that period, but sources claim that the number could be close to 300. As such, the island was avoided by locals, and other than the prison, was completely undeveloped.

After the prison was closed down in 2004, the island's pristine condition made it ideal as a reserve. It is now said that the prison is haunted by the ghosts of prisoners. One story is that a guard was chasing a prisoner, but the prisoner was a ghost. The guard was so scared that he shot himself. Coiba is also one of the last places in Central America where the scarlet macaw can be found in large numbers in the wild. The island is about 75% forested with a large fraction comprising standing ancient forest. Coiba Island is home to rare flora and fauna found only on the island. The island also harbours tree species that have long disappeared from the mainland due to deforestation and overharvesting.

== Coiba National Park ==
In 1992, Panama created Coiba National Park, encompassing over 1,042 square miles of islands, forests, beaches, mangroves and coral reefs, and in July 2005, Unesco declared it a World Heritage Site.

The park includes Coiba island, 38 smaller islands off the southwest coast of Panama, and the surrounding marine areas within the Gulf of Chiriquí providing protection for coral reefs, humpback whales, pilot whales, killer whales, dolphins, sea turtles, manta rays, marlins and other marine creatures. The park has been designated an Important Bird Area (IBA) by BirdLife International because it supports significant populations of brown-backed doves, Coiba spinetails and three-wattled bellbirds.

Due to the Gulf of Chiriquí's capacity to buffer against the effects of El Niño temperature swings, the marine ecosystems within Coiba National Park harbor a high degree of biodiversity. The park is home to 760 species of marine fishes, 33 species of sharks and 20 species of cetaceans.

== See also ==
- Jicarón
- Jicarita
