= Spotted dolphin =

Spotted dolphin refers to either one of two closely related dolphin species, being:

- Atlantic spotted dolphin, Stenella frontalis
- Pantropical spotted dolphin, Stenella attenuata

While the pantropical spotted dolphin can be found around the world's oceans where a tropical or subtropical climate exists, the Atlantic spotted dolphin can only be found in the Atlantic Ocean.
