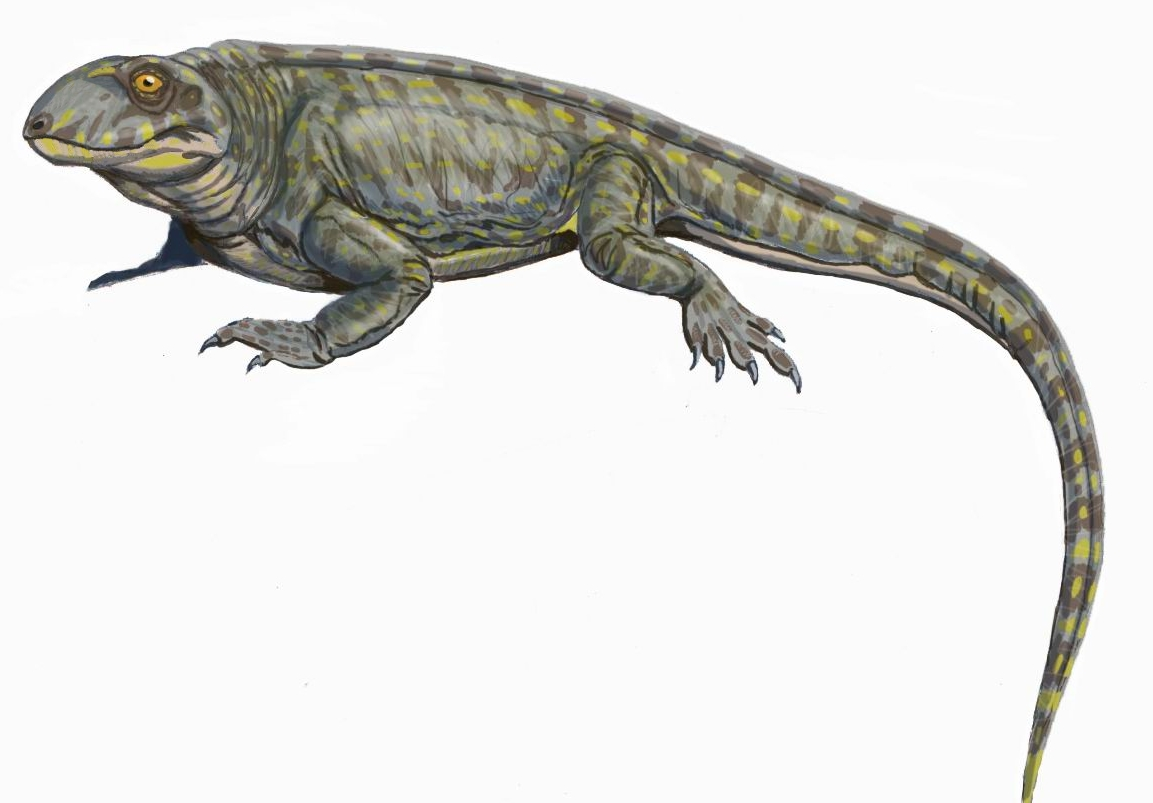
- Palaeohatteria longicaudata

Scientific classification
- Domain: Eukaryota
- Kingdom: Animalia
- Phylum: Chordata
- Clade: Synapsida
- Clade: Sphenacomorpha
- Clade: Sphenacodontia
- Clade: Pantherapsida
- Family: †Palaeohatteriidae; Baur, 1889

Type species
- †Palaeohatteria longicaudata Credner, 1888

Genera
- †Palaeohatteria Credner, 1888; †Pantelosaurus von Huene, 1925

= Palaeohatteriidae =

Palaeohatteriidae Temporal range: Early Permian, Asselian–Sakmarian

Extinct family of Permian organisms

Palaeohatteriidae is an extinct family of basal sphenacodonts known from the Early Permian period (Asselian-Sakmarian stages) of Saxony, Germany. Two genera are known: Palaeohatteria and Pantelosaurus.

== Classification ==
The cladogram below shows the phylogenetic positions of Palaeohatteria and Pantelosaurus phylogenetic position among other sphenacodonts following Fröbisch et al. (2011).

- - Edaphosauridae
  - Sphenacodontia
    - Haptodus garnettensis
    - - Palaeohatteria longicaudata
      - Pantelosaurus saxonicus
      - Ianthodon schultzei
      - - Cutleria wilmarthi
        - Sphenacodontoidea
          - Therapsida
          - Sphenacodontidae
            - Secodontosaurus obtusidens
            - - Cryptovenator hirschbergeri
              - - Sphenacodon
                - Ctenospondylus
                - Dimetrodon

Spindler (2016) utilized use of the name Palaeohatteriidae for the clade comprising Palaeohatteria and Pantelosaurus but not Ianthodon.
