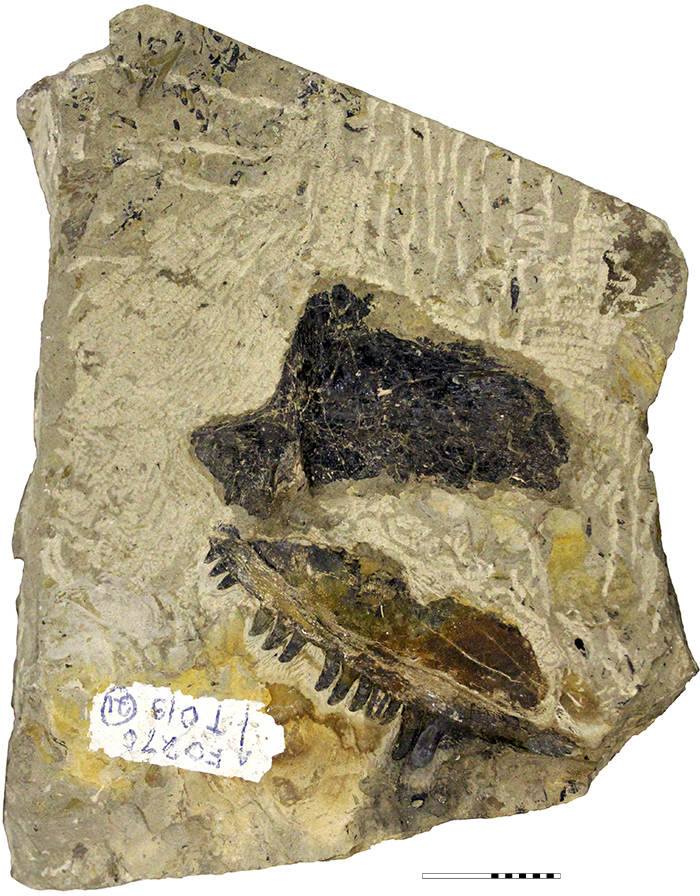
- Holotype fossil ROM 43608

Scientific classification
- Kingdom: Animalia
- Phylum: Chordata
- Clade: Synapsida
- Clade: Sphenacodontia
- Genus: †Kenomagnathus; Spindler, 2020
- Species: †K. scottae

Binomial name
- †Kenomagnathus scottae Spindler, 2020

= Kenomagnathus =

Kenomagnathus Temporal range: Late Pennsylvanian ~304 Ma

Extinct genus of synapsids

Kenomagnathus (meaning "gap jaw", in reference to the diastema in its upper tooth row) is a genus of synapsid belonging to the Sphenacodontia, which lived during the Pennsylvanian subperiod of the Carboniferous in what is now Garnett, Kansas, United States. It contains one species, Kenomagnathus scottae, based on a specimen consisting of the maxilla and lacrimal bones of the skull, which was catalogued as ROM 43608 and originally classified as belonging to "Haptodus" garnettensis. Frederik Spindler named it as a new genus in 2020.

== Discovery and naming ==
Norman Newell discovered a fossil locality near Garnett, Kansas, United States in 1931, belonging to the Rock Lake Member of the Stanton Formation. Around 1932, Henry Lane and Claude Hibbard had collected a variety of animal and plant fossils from the locality. Among these were skeletons of Petrolacosaurus, which were subsequently described in 1952 by Frank Peabody. Hoping to find more material, a field team from the University of Kansas Natural History Museum conducted further excavations in 1953 and 1954; they found trackways, coelacanth fish, several additional Petrolacosaurus skeletons, and "pelycosaur" (early-diverging synapsid) fossils representing three genera. One of these was a partial skeleton that distinctly differed from the others; when Peabody reported on these discoveries in 1957 paper, he observed that the skeleton was of a primitive sphenacodontid, but deferred its description to a later time.

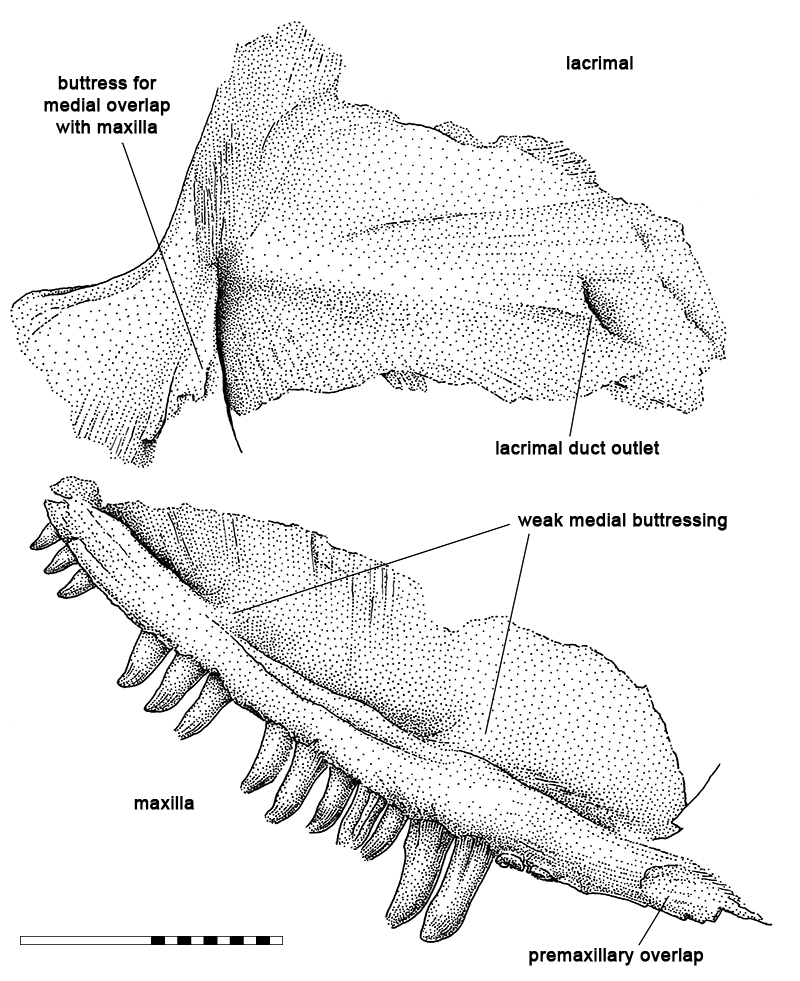
Interpretative drawing of the holotype ROM 43608

In 1965, Robert Carroll found another articulated partial skeleton in the same locality. Philip Currie attributed this skeleton to the primitive sphenacodontid of Peabody in 1977, and recognized it as a new species of Haptodus, which he named Haptodus garnettensis. However, up until that point, all specimens of H. garnettensis were either badly crushed or immature. Throughout the 1980s, a number of additional specimens were discovered at the locality, including adult and subadult specimens. This allowed Michel Laurin to identify distinguishing characteristics for H. garnettensis and to incorporate it into a phylogenetic analysis, which found it to be outside the Sphenacodontidae. He published these results in 1993. Among the additional specimens was a partial skull consisting of a left maxilla and lacrimal, which were catalogued in the Royal Ontario Museum (ROM) as ROM 43608.

Analyses of specimens assigned to H. garnettensis by Frederik Spindler and colleagues later suggested that there was not one but between four and six distinct taxa among them, which primarily differed in their jaws and teeth. They also recognized differences between "H." garnettensis and the type species of Haptodus, H. baylei. In a 2013 conference presentation, Spindler, Kirstin Brink, and Graciela Piñeiro suggested that this variation was based on diet, making these taxa a prehistoric analogue of Darwin's finches. Spindler formally named ROM 43608 as belonging to a new genus and species in 2020, which he named Kenomagnathus scottae. The generic name Kenomagnathus is derived from the Greek words κένωμα ("gap") and γνάθος ("jaw"), referencing the diastema (gap) in its tooth row. Meanwhile, the specific name scottae honours Diane Scott, a fossil preparator at the University of Toronto Mississauga who "greatly helped with teaching and specimen handling", inspired Spindler's research, and further prepared the specimen in 2013.

== Description ==
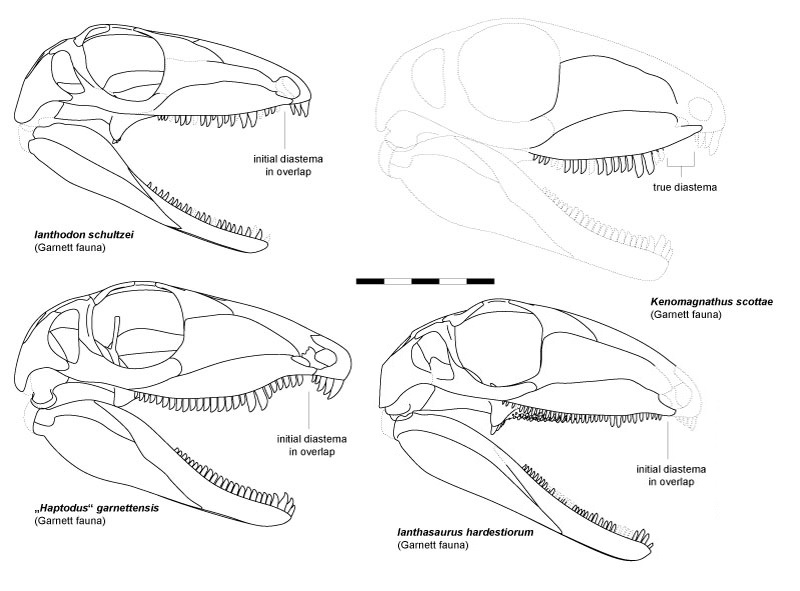
Skull reconstruction of Kenomagnathus (top right) compared to other Garnett "haptodontines"

Among close relatives, Kenomagnathus can be distinguished by its tall snout, judging by the maxilla and especially the lacrimal. The projection at the front of the lacrimal would have formed a large part of the rear border of the bony nostrils. In "H." garnettensis, the lacrimal still contributed to the border, but with a narrow projection. From below, the upward projection at the front of the maxilla would also have contributed to the border of the nostrils, but the angle of this projection differed from "H." garnettensis. The height of the lacrimal, which bordered the front of the eye socket, also implies that Kenomagnathus had large eyes.

The tooth-bearing bottom margin of the maxilla in Kenomagnathus was more convex than "H." garnettensis, and is unique in that it lacked a concave region (or "precanine step"). Another distinguishing characteristic is the diastema, a toothless region spanning the width of three teeth at the front of the maxilla, where the bone noticeably thinned and could not have borne tooth sockets. Behind the diastema were two precanine teeth, two large canine teeth, and at least fourteen post-canine teeth (eleven being preserved). There were two weakly thickened regions, or buttresses, on the maxilla, with one above the canines and one further back. Due to the shortness of the maxilla, the canines were located further forward than in close relatives. Like "H." garnettensis, Kenomagnathus had tall and nearly straight teeth, with striations on the inner surfaces of the teeth reaching the tips, but those of Kenomagnathus were more slender and blunter at the tip.

== Classification ==
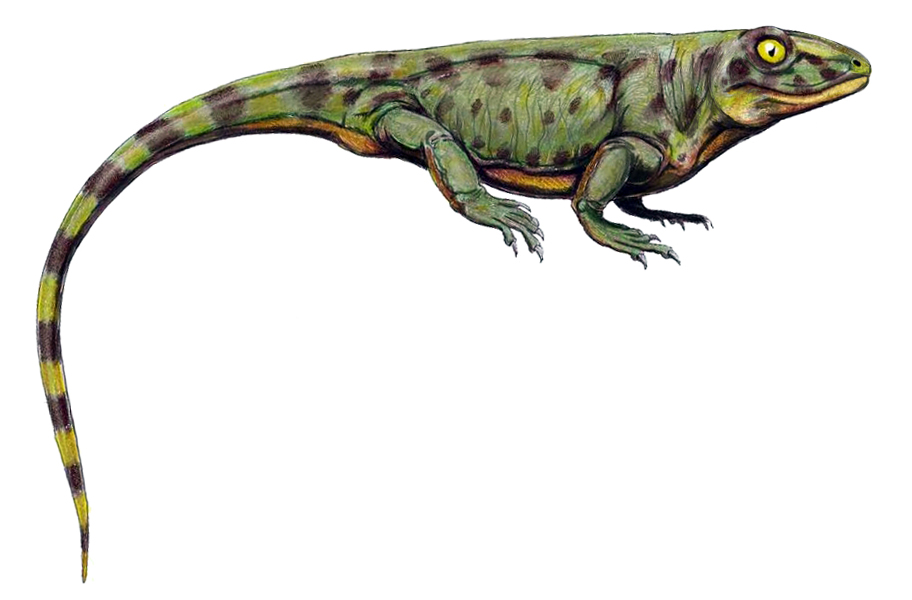
Life restoration

In 2020, Spindler identified three characteristics that placed Kenomagnathus in the Sphenacodontia: the blunt teeth, the convex bottom margin of the maxilla, and the height of the lacrimal and the upward projection of the maxilla. However, based on the contribution of the lacrimal to the border of the bony nostrils, Kenomagnathus was excluded from the more restrictive group Sphenacodontoidea. Within this evolutionary grade of "haptodontine" sphenacodontians, the fragmentary nature of specimens has complicated the resolution of their relationships. This is exacerbated by the fact that many "haptodontines" are very similar to each other save for differences in their teeth and skull proportions.

For his 2015 thesis, Spindler conducted a preliminary phylogenetic analysis of "haptodontines", based on a new set of characteristics that he assembled to resolve their relationships. After defining the specimens associated with "H." garnettensis as opposed to Kenomagnathus and a taxon he named "Tenuacaptor reiszi", he could not resolve whether Kenomagnathus or Ianthodon was more basal (less specialized). Removing "Tenuacaptor" produced a more derived (more specialized) position for both Kenomagnathus and "H." garnettensis inside the Sphenacodontia. Phylogenetic trees illustrating both phylogenetic hypotheses are shown below.

Topology A: All genera and characteristics

- Eupelycosauria
  - Varanopidae
  - Ophiacodontidae
  - Haptodontiformes
    - Ianthodon schultzei
    - "Haptodus" garnettensis
    - Kenomagnathus scottae
    - - Haptodus bayleyi
      - "Tenuacaptor reiszi"
      - Sphenacomorpha
        - Edaphosauridae
          - Xyrospondylus ecordi
          - - Ianthasaurus harderstiorum
            - Edaphosaurus
        - Sphenacodontia
          - Pantelosaurus saxonicus
          - Sphenacodon

Topology B: With "Tenuacaptor" and some tooth-based characteristics removed

- Eupelycosauria
  - Varanopidae
  - Ophiacodontidae
  - Haptodontiformes
    - Ianthodon schultzei
    - Sphenacomorpha
      - Edaphosauridae
        - Xyrospondylus ecordi
        - - Ianthasaurus harderstiorum
          - Edaphosaurus
      - Sphenacodontia
        - "Haptodus" garnettensis
        - - Kenomagnathus scottae
          - - - Haptodus bayleyi
              - Pantelosaurus saxonicus
            - Sphenacodon

=== Evolutionary history ===
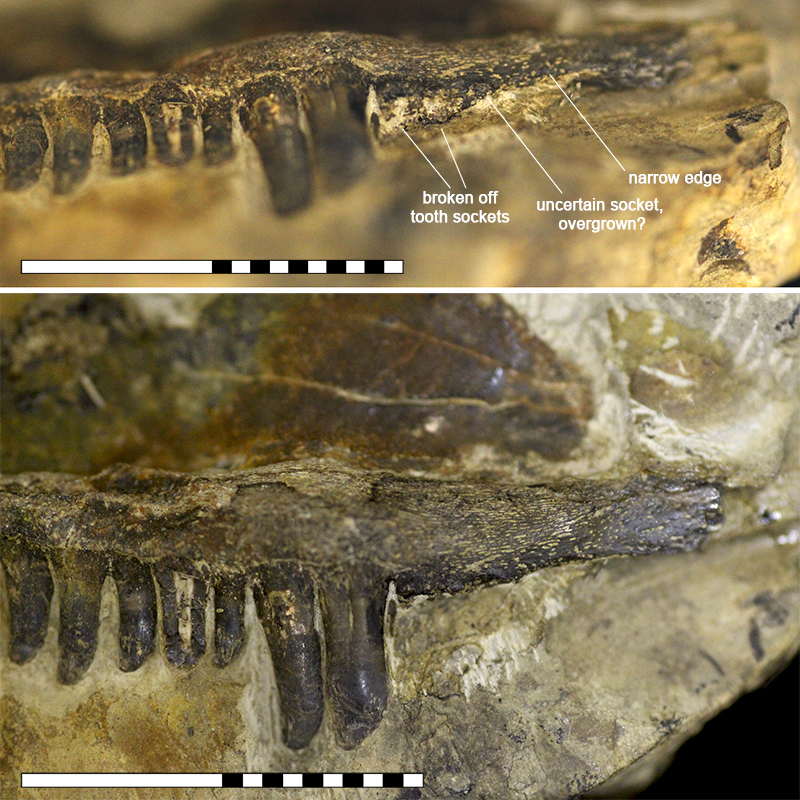
Closeup showing the diastema of Kenomagnathus

Modern mammals (except whales) commonly exhibit heterodont teeth, or teeth of several different types. Among the extinct relatives (stem group) of mammals, there is a gradient from animals with isodont (uniform) teeth to animals with heterodont teeth, associated with the development of distinct "zones" along the tooth row. Canine-like teeth — double canines like that of Kenomagnathus in particular — are common among basal synapsids and also other basal amniotes, along with the enlargement of the first premaxillary tooth at the front of the skull. There is a morphological gap between basal synapsids like "Haptodus" garnettensis, which have precanine teeth but less tooth variation over all, and therapsids (which are closer to mammals), which have no precanine teeth, only one set of canines, and more subtle tooth variation. Precanine teeth are often replaced by a large diastema in therapsids.

Kenomagnathus had both precanine teeth and a diastema, which fills the gap between basal synapsids and therapsids to some extent. It reflects what would have been an ongoing transition, which other stem-mammals with diastemata would also have gone through. Spindler hypothesized that the diastema initially developed as a consequence of the maxilla and premaxilla being angled against each other by the precanine step, which would have prevented the precanine teeth from growing longer; this is seen as an "initial diastema" in "H." garnettensis, Ianthasaurus, and Ianthodon. This would have allowed the corresponding canines on the lower jaw to grow longer and fill the gap, which in turn would have led to a full diastema. However, Spindler also noted that the relationship between the development of the precanine step, tooth loss, and the diastema was unclear, and that the feeding styles of these animals may also have had an effect.

== Paleobiology ==
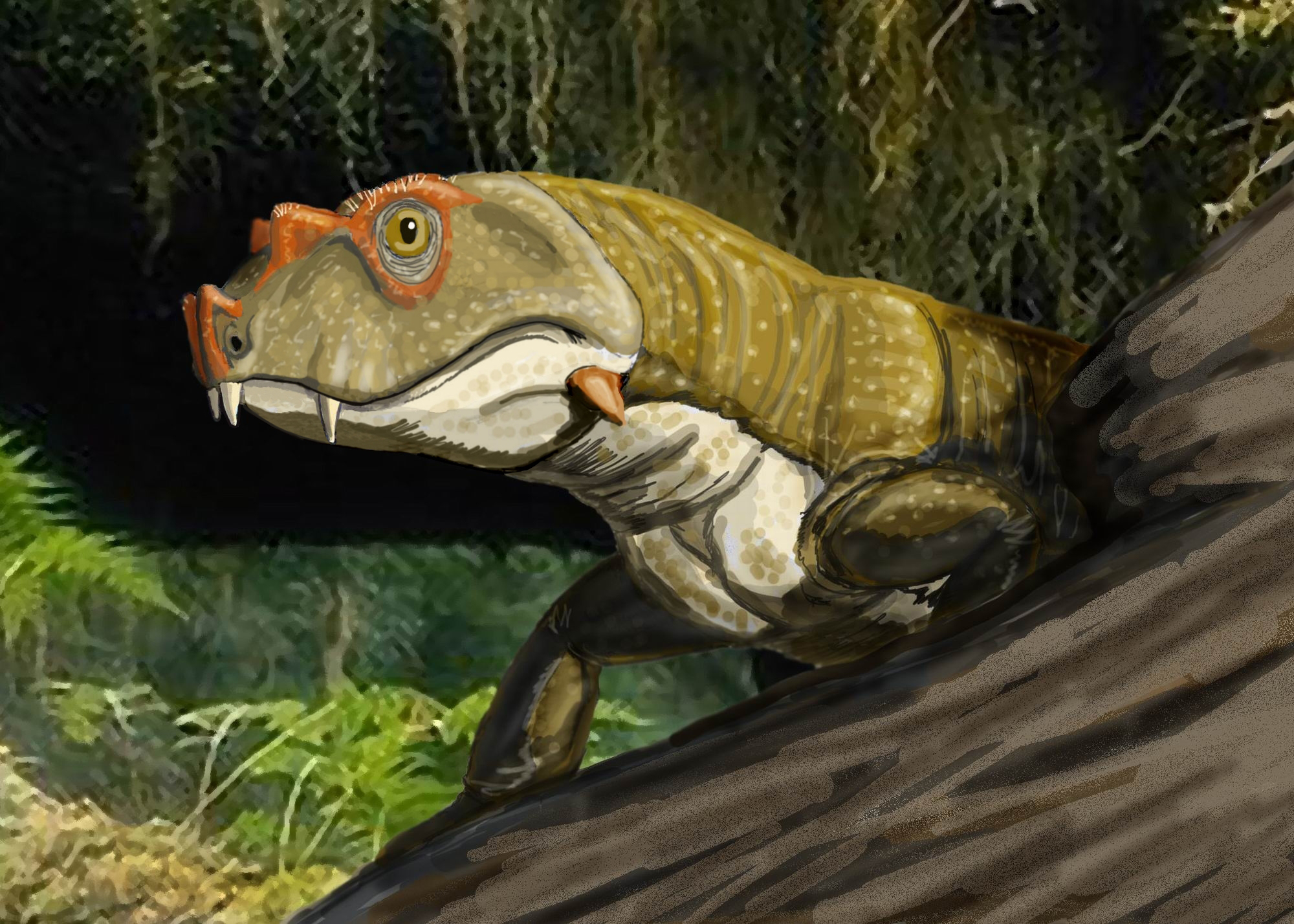
The skull of Kenomagnathus has been compared to Tetraceratops

Spindler likened Kenomagnathus to the enigmatic synapsid Tetraceratops, as both had short faces, large eyes, and a diastema in their jaws. While this implies that the skulls of both were specialized for food processing, Spindler noted that further comparisons "cover a wide range of possibilities". In particular, Tetraceratops was highly specialized; the diastema in Tetraceratops does not line up with the position of the lower canines, but is located slightly behind it, and the first premaxillary tooth would have jutted out from the front of the jaws when they were closed. Spindler suggested in 2019 that Tetraceratops was durophagous (i.e. it fed on hard-shelled prey), based primarily on its teeth. He inferred a similar lifestyle for Kenomagnathus based on its tall skull in 2020, and suggested that the diastema of Kenomagnathus may have been covered by rigid tissue, against which a potentially enlarged lower tooth would have pressed to crush prey items.

== Paleoecology ==
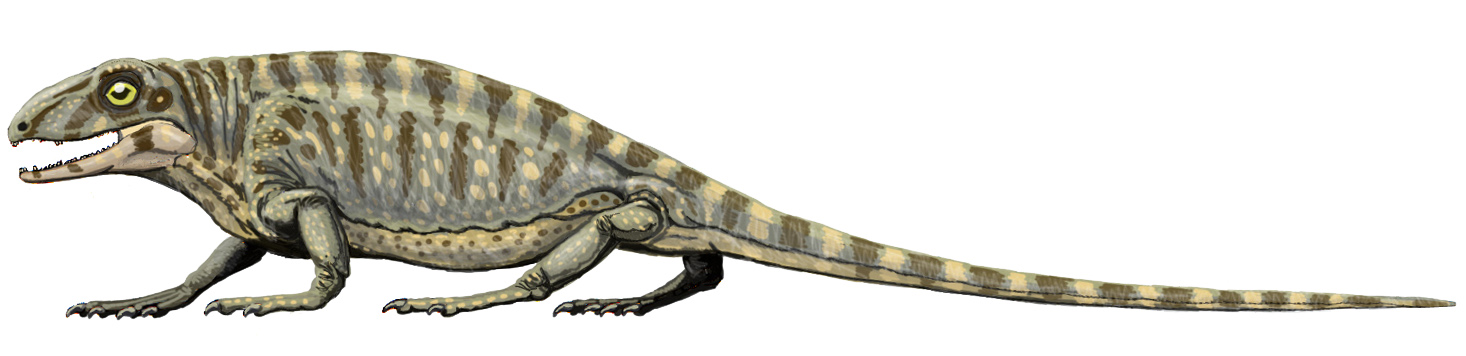
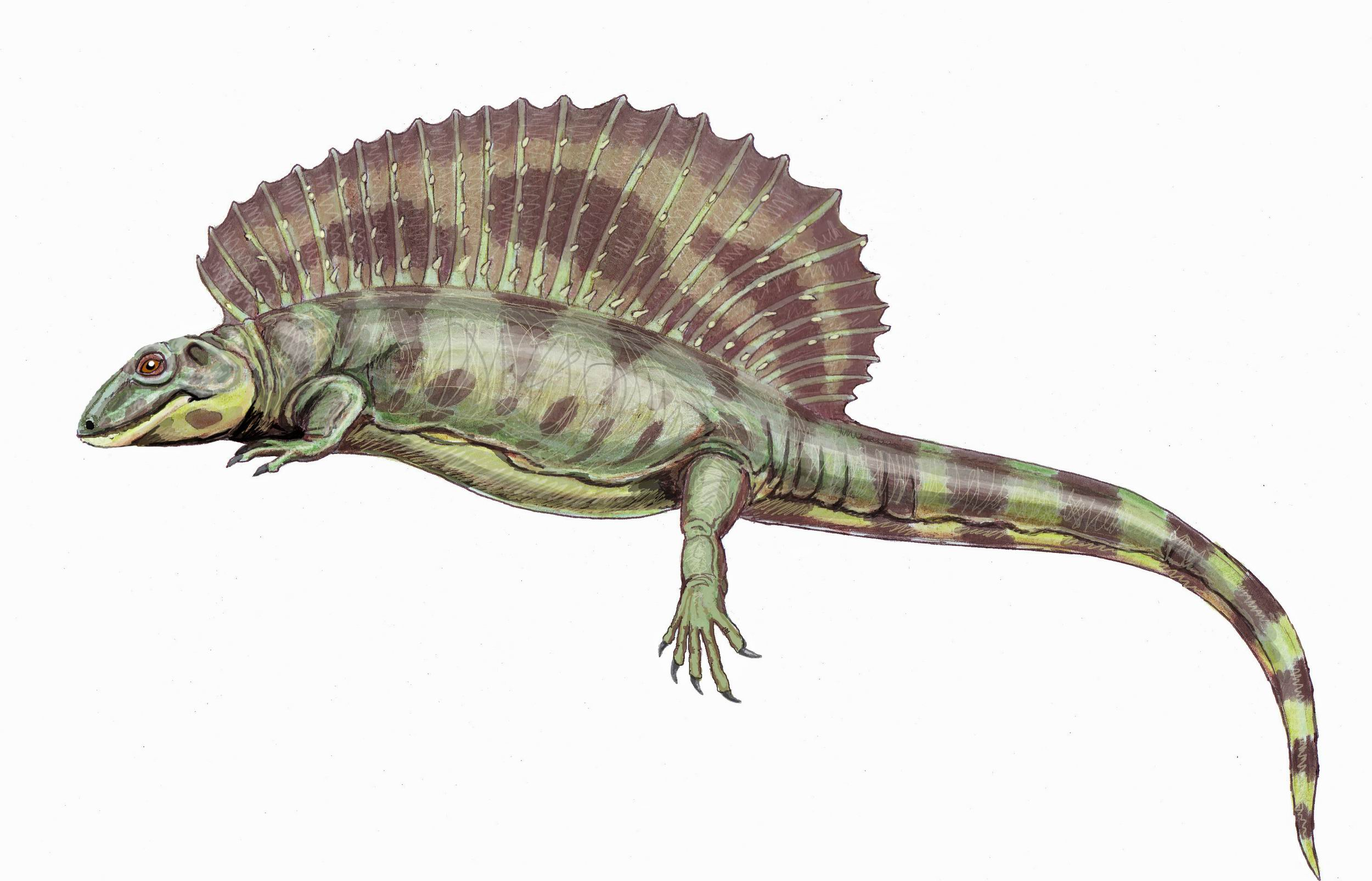
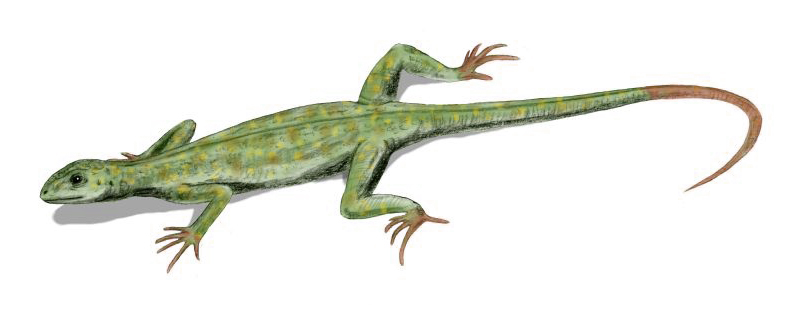
Contemporary animals: "Haptodus" garnettensis, Ianthasaurus, and Petrolacosaurus

The rocks that Kenomagnathus was found in originate from the base of the Rock Lake Member of the Stanton Formation, which is in turn part of the Lansing Group. These rocks have been assigned to the Late Pennsylvanian subperiod of the Carboniferous period, specifically near the transition between the Kasimovian and Gzhelian ages around 304 Ma (million years ago).

At the Garnett locality, the base of the Rock Lake Member consists of carbonaceous calcareous mudstone (i.e. mudstone containing organic matter and calcium carbonate) that is moderately layered and dark greyish-brown in color. Plant fossils in these rocks are dominated by the conifers Lebachia and Walchia, along with smaller plants like the ferns Dichophyllum, the seed ferns Alethopteris, Neuropteris, and Taeniopteris, the cycad Spermopteris, the horsetail Annularia, and the gymnosperm Cordaites. At the top of these rocks is a layer of marine bivalve fossils measuring 2–5 cm (0.8–2 in) thick, which were likely deposited at high tide. Collectively, this implies that Kenomagnathus lived on a coastal plain in a coniferous forest. Towards the top of the Rock Lake Member, the rock layers become more irregular, and fossils of land animals and plants are increasingly replaced by fossils of marine invertebrates, implying that estuarine waters gradually flooded the region as sea levels rose.

The Garnett locality has produced several basal synapsids, including the "haptodontines" Kenomagnathus, "H." garnettensis, "Tenuacaptor", and Ianthodon; the edaphosaurid Ianthasaurus; the enigmatic synapsid Xyrospondylus, which may also be an edaphosaurid; an undescribed member of Ophiacodontidae that has been assigned to Ophiacodon and Clepsydrops; and possibly another sphenacodontian. Petrolacosaurus is the most common reptile, known from nearly fifty specimens; a possible member of the Protorothyrididae is also known from tracks. Only the amphibian Actiobates is known, while the fish consist of the coelacanth Synaptotylus, a larger coelacanth, and xenacanthid sharks. Invertebrates include insects like Euchoroptera and Parabrodia; the scorpion Garnettius; the bivalves Myalinella, Sedgwickia, and Yoldia; the brachiopods Composita, Lingula, and Neospirifer; and bryozoans, serpulid worms, trilobites, crinoids, sea urchins, rugosan corals, and sponges. Spindler speculated that Kenomagnathus may have fed on bivalves.
