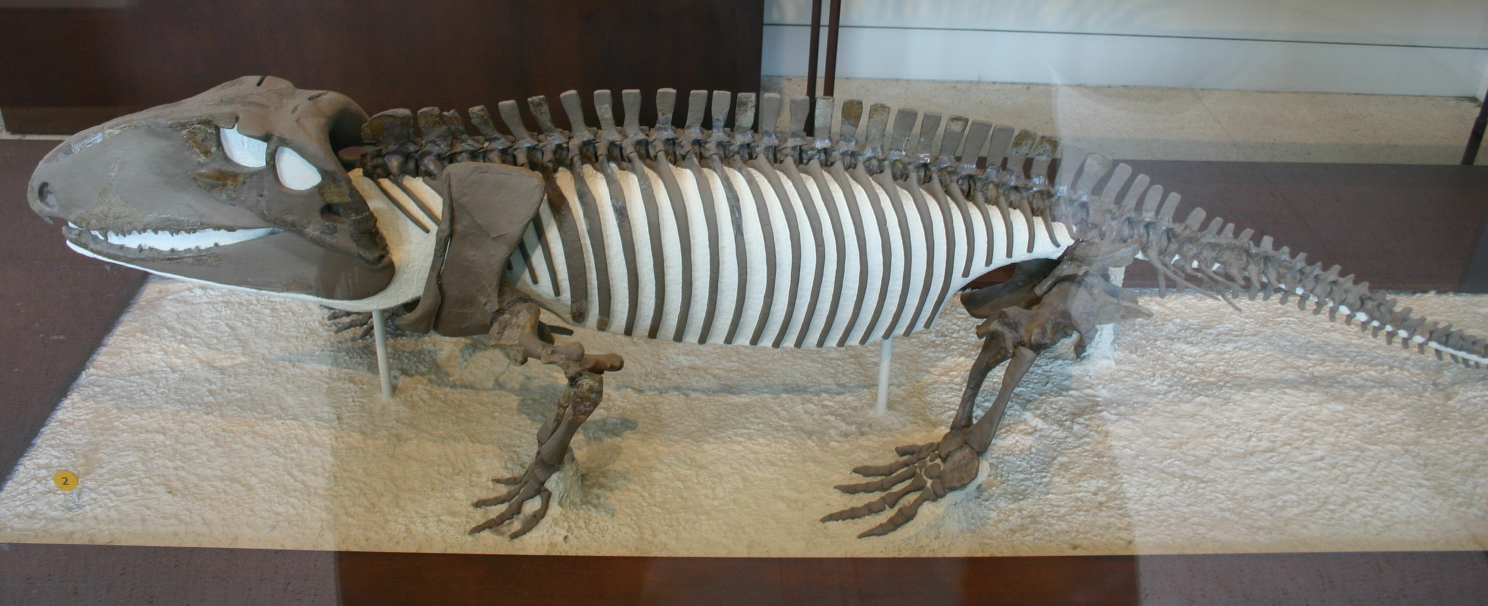
- Skeleton of Ophiacodon (Ophiacodontidae)
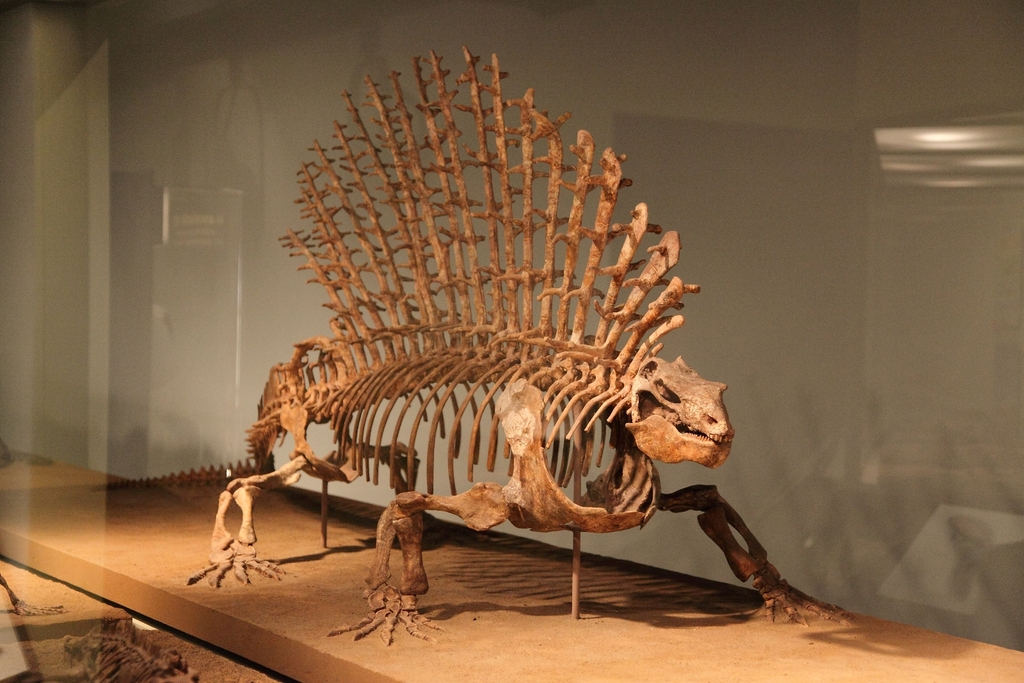
- Edaphosaurus pogonias (Edaphosauridae) skeleton mounted at the Field Museum

Scientific classification
- Kingdom: Animalia
- Phylum: Chordata
- Clade: Synapsida
- Clade: Eupelycosauria; Kemp, 1982

Subgroups
- †Varanopidae?; Metopophora Spindler et al., 2018; †Ophiacodontidae; Haptodontiformes Spindler et al., 2018; †Ianthodon; †Milosaurus; †Kenomagnathus; Sphenacomorpha Ivakhnenko, 2003; †Edaphosauridae; Sphenacodontia

= Eupelycosauria =

Eupelycosauria Temporal range: Pennsylvanian–Recent, 308–0 Ma Possible Bashkirian records.

Clade of synapsids

Eupelycosauria is a large clade of animals characterized by the unique shape of their skull, encompassing all mammals and their closest extinct relatives. They first appeared 308 million years ago during the Early Pennsylvanian epoch, with the fossils of Echinerpeton and perhaps an even earlier genus, Protoclepsydrops, representing just one of the many stages in the evolution of mammals, in contrast to their earlier amniote ancestors.

== Taxonomy ==
Eupelycosaurs are synapsids, animals whose skull has a single opening behind the eye. They are distinguished from the Caseasaurian synapsids by having a long, narrow supratemporal bone (instead of one that is as wide as it is long) and a frontal bone with a wider connection to the upper margin of the orbit. The only living descendants of basal eupelycosaurs are the mammals.

The group was originally considered a suborder of pelycosaurs or "mammal like reptiles", but it was redefined in 1997, and the term pelycosaur itself has fallen into disfavor. We now know that the eupelycosaurs were not in fact reptiles nor of reptile lineage - the modern term stem mammal is used instead. Some recent studies suggested that one of its subgroups, Varanopidae, are really nested within sauropsids, leaving the other defined subgroup of it, Metopophora, as its synonym.

== Evolution ==
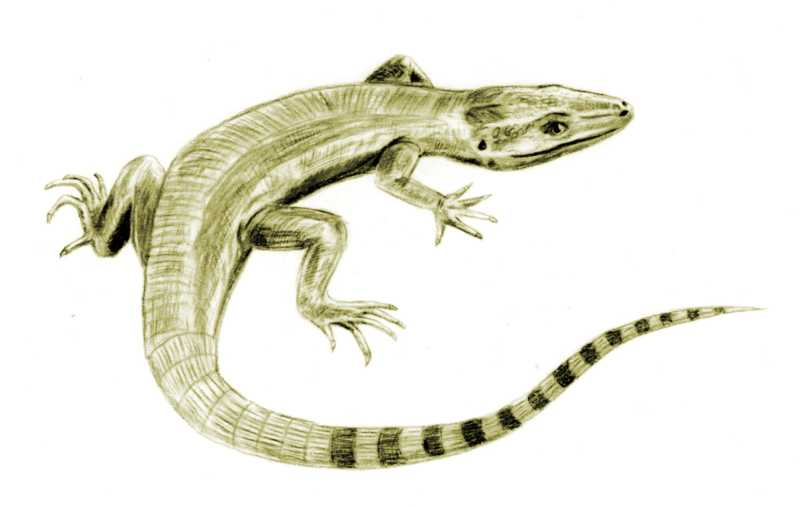
Archaeothyris belongs to the family Ophiacodontidae and appears in the Early Pennsylvanian

Many non-therapsid eupelycosaurs were the dominant land animals from the latest Carboniferous to the end of the Early Permian epoch. Ophiacodontids were common from their appearance in the late Carboniferous (Pennsylvanian) to the early Permian, but they became progressively smaller as the early Permian progressed. The edaphosaurids, along with the caseids, were the dominant herbivores in the early part of the Permian. The most renowned edaphosaurid is Edaphosaurus, a large [10–12-foot-long (3.0–3.7 m)] herbivore which had a sail on its back, probably used for thermoregulation and mating. Sphenacodontids, a family of carnivorous eupelycosaurs, included the famous Dimetrodon, which is sometimes mistaken for a dinosaur, and was the largest predator of the period. Like Edaphosaurus, Dimetrodon also had a distinctive sail on its back, and it probably served the same purpose - regulating heat. The varanopid family passingly resembled today's monitor lizards and may have had the same lifestyle.

Therapsids descended from a clade closely related to the sphenacodontids. They became the succeeding dominant land animals for the rest of the Permian, and in the latter part of the Triassic, descendants of the cynodonts, an advanced group of therapsids, gave rise to the first true mammals. All non-therapsid synapsids, including all basal eupelycosaurs, as well as many other life forms, became extinct at the end of Permian period.

== Classification ==
The following cladogram is modified from Huttenlocker et al. (2021):

- Synapsida
  - † Caseasauria
  - Eupelycosauria
    - † Varanopidae
    - † Ophiacodontidae
    - Sphenacomorpha
      - † Edaphosauridae
      - Sphenacodontia
        - † Haptodus
        - † Ianthodon
        - - † Palaeohatteria
          - - † Pantelosaurus
            - Sphenacodontoidea
              - † Sphenacodontidae
                - † Cutleria
                - - † Secodontosaurus
                  - - † Cryptovenator
                    - - - † Sphenacodon
                        - † Ctenospondylus
                      - † Dimetrodon
              - † Shashajaia bermani
              - Therapsida
                - † Raranimus
                - - † Dinocephalia
                  - - † Anomodontia
                    - † Biarmosuchia
                    - - † Gorgonopsia
                      - - † Therocephalia
                        - to Mammaliaformes
