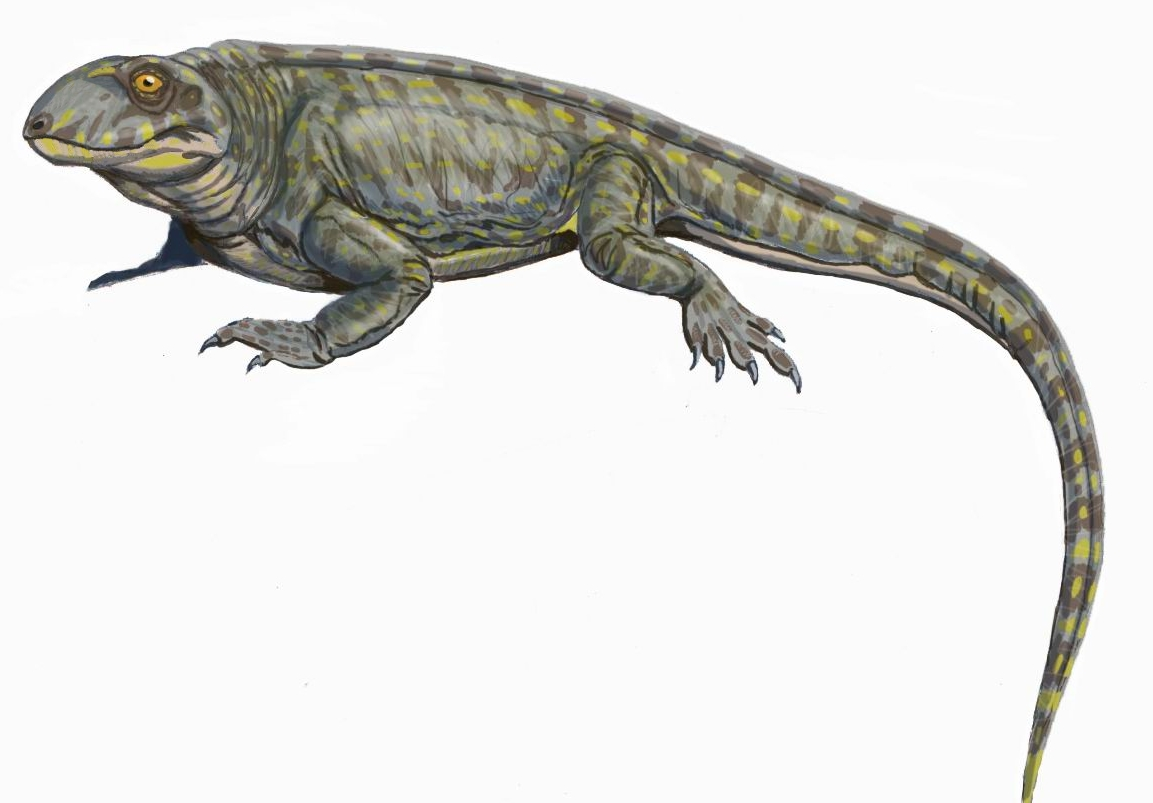

Scientific classification
- Domain: Eukaryota
- Kingdom: Animalia
- Phylum: Chordata
- Clade: Synapsida
- Clade: Sphenacodontia
- Clade: Pantherapsida
- Family: †Palaeohatteriidae
- Genus: †Palaeohatteria; Credner, 1888

Type species
- †Palaeohatteria longicaudata Credner, 1888

Synonyms
- Palaeosphenodon Baur, 1889 Palaeosphenodon longicaudata Baur, 1889; Haptodus longicaudata Romer & Price, 1940

= Palaeohatteria =

Palaeohatteria Temporal range: Early Permian, Sakmarian

Extinct genus of synapsids

Palaeohatteria is an extinct genus of basal sphenacodonts known from the Early Permian period (Sakmarian stage) of Saxony, Germany. It contains a single species, Palaeohatteria longicaudata.

== Discovery ==
Palaeohatteria is based on very young individuals including skulls and partial postcranial skeletons. All specimens were collected at Niederhäslich locality, in Dresden, from the Niederhäslich Limestone Member of the Niederhäslich Formation, Rotliegend Group (Döhlen Basin), dating to the Sakmarian stage of the Cisuralian series, about 295.0 to 290.1 million years old.

== Description ==
Size comparison

Palaeohatteria was a fairly small synapsid, up to 60 cm in length and with a mass of about 3 kg. The affinities of Palaeohatteria to the pelycosaur were first described in details by Alfred Sherwood Romer and Llewellyn Price (1940). They revised the taxonomy of pelycosaurs and synonymized Palaeohatteria (alongside with Pantelosaurus and others) with Haptodus, creating the new combination Haptodus longicaudata. After describing a new species of Haptodus in 1977, Currie (1979) synonymized all European haptodontines, as well as Cutleria wilmarthi, with the type of the genus, H. baylei. Later, Laurin (1993 and 1994) considered Haptodontinae to represent a polyphyletic grade of basal sphenacodonts, and revalidated Palaeohatteria among other genera and species. His revision has been accepted since. Due to the early ontological state of its remains, it is rarely included in phylogenetic analyses. However, it is well established that Palaeohatteria is closely related to "haptodontines" (=basal sphenacodonts) like Pantelosaurus. The cladogram below shows Palaeohatteria phylogenetic position among other sphenacodonts following Fröbisch et al. (2011).

- - Edaphosauridae
  - Sphenacodontia
    - Haptodus garnettensis
    - - Palaeohatteria longicaudata
      - Pantelosaurus saxonicus
      - Ianthodon schultzei
      - - Cutleria wilmarthi
        - Sphenacodontoidea
          - Therapsida
          - Sphenacodontidae
            - Secodontosaurus obtusidens
            - - Cryptovenator hirschbergeri
              - - Sphenacodon
                - Ctenospondylus
                - Dimetrodon

Spindler (2016) utilized use of the name Palaeohatteriidae for the clade comprising Palaeohatteria and Pantelosaurus.

== Etymology ==
Palaeohatteria was first described and named by Carl Friedrich Heinrich Credner in 1888 and the type species is Palaeohatteria longicaudata. The generic name is derived from Greek παλαιός (palaios) "old, ancient", and from Hatteria, a proposed common name and generic name (like Rhynchocephalus) to the Tuatara (Sphenodon punctatus). Credner considered it to be an ancient relative of "Hatteria". Baur (1889), who considered the name Sphenodon to be valid for Tuatara (while "Hatteria" is a junior synonym, as it is accepted today), claimed that the name Palaeohatteria should be also invalid. He proposed the name Palaeosphenodon (meaning "ancient Sphenodon") to replace it, however his proposal was rejected. Hence, Palaeosphenodon is a junior synonym of Palaeohatteria. The specific name is derived from Greek meaning "long-tailed" in reference to its relatively long tail.
