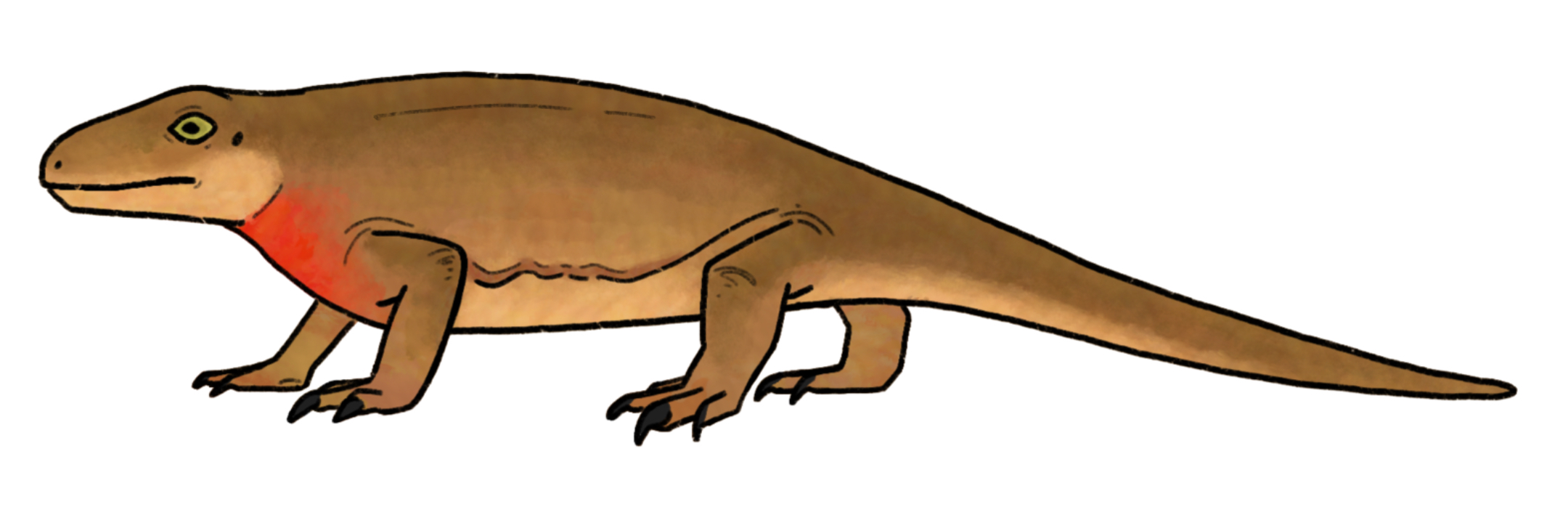
- Life reconstruction of Milosaurus mccordi

Scientific classification
- Kingdom: Animalia
- Phylum: Chordata
- Clade: Synapsida
- Clade: Eupelycosauria
- Clade: Metopophora
- Clade: Haptodontiformes
- Genus: †Milosaurus; DeMar, 1970

Type species
- †Milosaurus mccordi DeMar, 1970

= Milosaurus =

Milosaurus Temporal range: Late Carboniferous-Early Permian, 306.95–295.0 Ma

Extinct genus of synapsids

Milosaurus is an extinct genus of non-mammalian synapsids native to Illinois that was alive during the latest Carboniferous and earliest Permian. It was named in 1970 on the basis of FMNH 701, a partial skeleton, as well as referred material.

== Discovery ==
The holotype of Milosaurus was found in the Falmouth locality in Jasper County, Illinois. At the time, the discovery was only the second sphenacodont found in Illinois, the first being Macromerion. Since then the assignment of Milosaurus to Sphenacodontia has been refuted.

The name Milosaurus mccordi refers to Milo Flynn and Chester McCord, the men on whose property the fossils were found.

The material recovered from the area includes the holotype, which consists of a pelvis, hind limb and pes, and caudal vertebrae. Referred material from nearby was also recovered and were thought to possibly be from the same individual which consisted of a lumbar vertebra, a neural spine, a "rib", and a piece of maxilla with teeth. The validity of this referred material has been debated. The main reason this material was referred to Milosaurus was because at the time there had been no other known synapsid discoveries in the area, leading to the assumption that all discovered material belonged to Milosaurus. However, since the 1970 publication, an undescribed neural spine that belongs to an edaphosaurid has been found in the area. Additionally, the maxilla and poorly-described neural arch have since been lost.

The "rib" was later identified as actually being a femur much smaller than the holotype, indicating it may be from a juvenile Milosaurus.

== Description ==
Milosaurus was one of the largest synapsids of its time, estimated to have weighed around 41 kilograms. It may be a third example of large body size developing in synapsids in the Carboniferous, the other two instances being herbivorous edaphosaurids and then sphenacodontids. Like its close relative Ianthodon, it would likely have a relatively tall snout and, as is common for early non-mammalian synapsids, a sprawling posture.

== Classification ==
Milosaurus was recovered within the Haptodontiformes which currently includes Ianthodon. However, due to the known material of Milosaurus and Ianthodon, it is impossible to determine their relationship to each other. Milosaurus can confidently be placed outside of the clade containing Edaphosauridae and Sphenacodontia because of the lack of a anterodorsal expansion on its ilium and the presence of a groove on its dorsal surface.

== See also ==
- List of pelycosaurs
