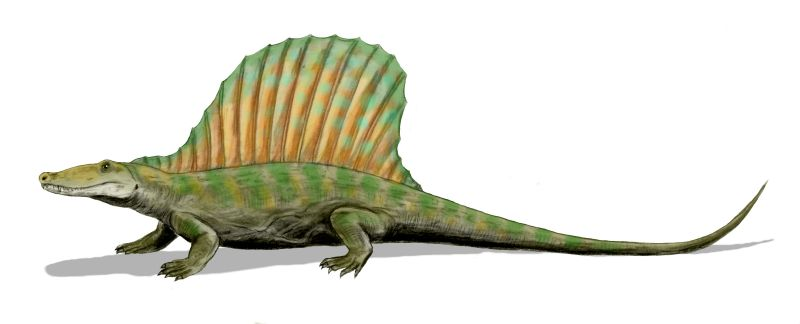
- Restoration of S. obtusidens

Scientific classification
- Kingdom: Animalia
- Phylum: Chordata
- Clade: Synapsida
- Family: †Sphenacodontidae
- Genus: †Secodontosaurus; Romer, 1936

Species
- †S. obtusidens (Cope, 1878) (type); †S. willistoni Romer, 1936

= Secodontosaurus =

Secodontosaurus Temporal range: Cisuralian (Artinskian to Kungurian), 285–272.3 Ma

Extinct genus of synapsids

Secodontosaurus (meaning "cutting-tooth lizard") is an extinct genus of "pelycosaur" synapsids that lived from between about 285 to 272 million years ago during the Early Permian. Like the well known Dimetrodon, Secodontosaurus is a carnivorous member of the Eupelycosauria family Sphenacodontidae and has a similar tall dorsal sail. However, its skull is long, low, and narrow, with slender jaws that have teeth that are very similar in size and shape—unlike the shorter, deep skull of Dimetrodon ("two-measure tooth"), which has large, prominent canine-like teeth in front and smaller slicing teeth further back in its jaws. Its unusual long, narrow jaws suggest that Secodontosaurus may have been specialized for catching fish or for hunting prey that lived or hid in burrows or crevices. Although no complete skeletons are currently known, Secodontosaurus likely ranged from about 2 to 3 metres (7–10 ft) in length, weighing up to 110–310 pounds (50–140 kg).

Fossils of Secodontosaurus have been found in Texas in North America in the Wichita and the Clear Fork groups of Early Permian formations. In recent years, teams from the Houston Museum of Natural Science have recovered remains in the Clear Fork Red Beds of North Texas that appear to be new specimens of Secodontosaurus. These discoveries are mentioned in online blogs but so far have not been formally described.

== Etymology ==
The name Secodontosaurus comes from Latin seco ('to cut') + Greek ὀδούς, ὀδόντος (odoús, -odont, 'tooth') + Greek σαῦρος (-saurus, 'lizard') and is based on the anatomical term "secodont" for teeth with cutting edges designed to tear or slice flesh. Paleontologist Robert Bakker has dubbed Secodontosaurus the "fox-faced finback" after its long jaws.

== Description ==
A number of partial fossil remains of Secodontosaurus have been identified from its characteristic long skull and jaws. The postcranial skeletal material from different individuals includes parts of the backbone with clear evidence of a tall sail very similar to that of Dimetrodon. The limbs and tail are incomplete but probably resembled those of Dimetrodon as well. Like Dimetrodon, Secodontosaurus would have had a short neck, robust body, short limbs, and a long tail. In light of such similarities, some skeletal remains with missing or fragmentary skulls that were previously identified as Dimetrodon may in fact belong to Secodontosaurus. A key noncranial difference can be found in the axis neck vertebra, which has a tall and broad neural spine in Dimetrodon but has a lower neural spine in Secodontosaurus.

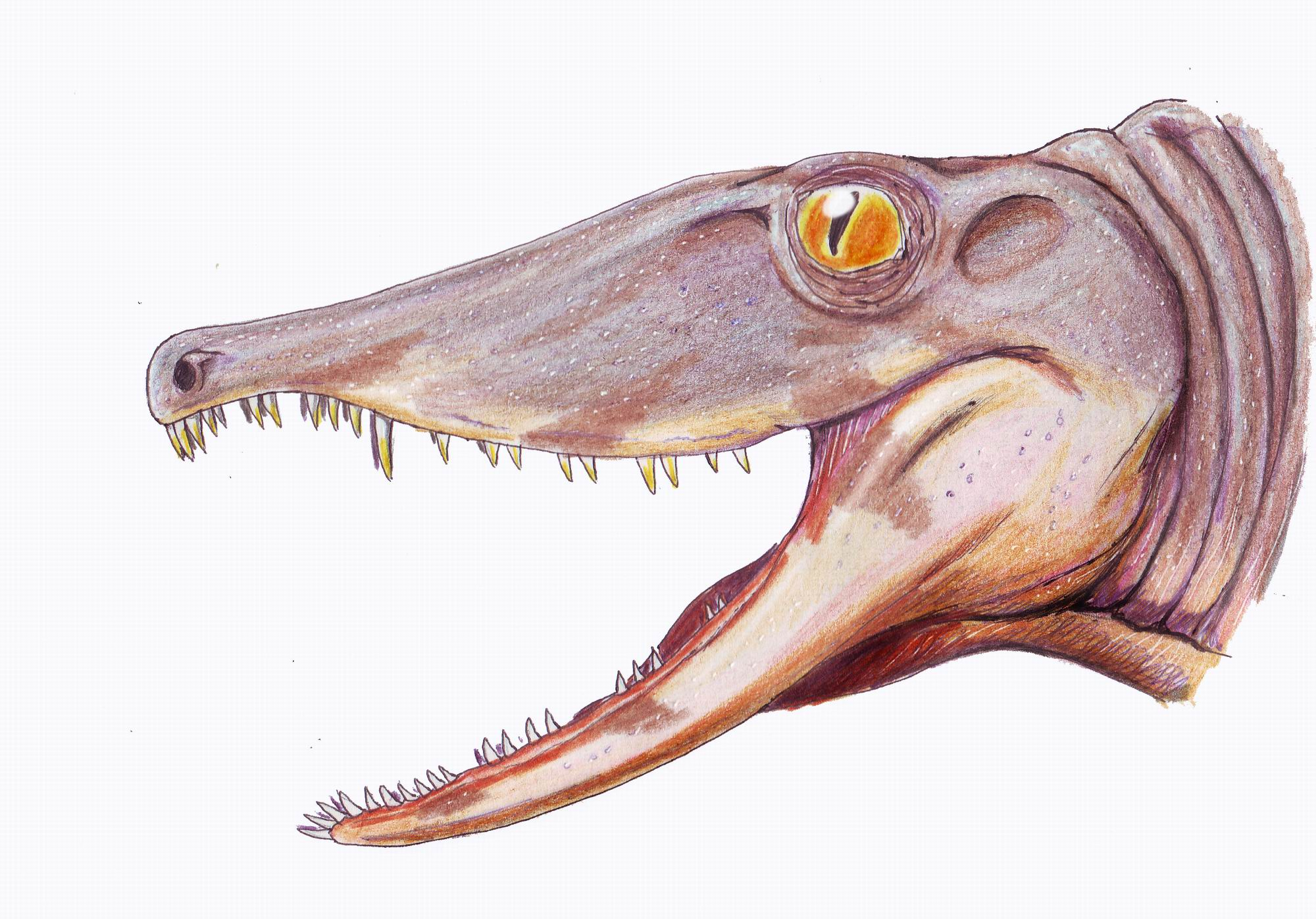
S. obtusidens head

Robert R. Reisz and others described the skull in detail in 1992, based mostly on a nearly complete skull specimen (MCZ 1124) about 27 cm (11 in) long, preserved with a left mandible. In addition to the long, low skull and nearly uniform size of the teeth that contrast with Dimetrodon, the anterior teeth of the upper jaw are slanted back and those of the lower jaw are directed forward for grasping prey. Its rather crocodile-like skull suggests that Secodontosaurus could have been semi-aquatic and may have fed on fish and small swimming amphibians. However, Reisz and his coauthors noted that a tall sail would seem to be a hindrance in pursuit of quick-moving creatures underwater. Instead, the long, narrow snout with forward slanting teeth at the mandible tip might have allowed Secodontosaurus to probe after small animals hiding in burrows and other tight spaces.

== Discovery and classification ==
The American paleontologist Edward Drinker Cope published the first description of Secodontosaurus material in 1880 as a supposed species of his genus Theropleura ("mammal rib"). Theropleura Cope, 1878 is a junior synonym of Ophiacodon Marsh, 1878 ("snake point tooth"). The specimen, AMNH 4007 collected by Jacob Boll, was actually a composite that included bones of "amphibians" and a sphenacodontid. Cope described the teeth as having "apices are not very acute. The superficial coating is striate with fifteen or sixteen rather obtuse ridges"—features expressed in the species name Theropleura obtusidens (Latin for "obtuse tooth" or "blunt-toothed").

E. C. Case described another specimen of Secodontosaurus, AMNH 4091, as Dimetrodon longiramus ["long (lower jaw) ramus"] in 1907.

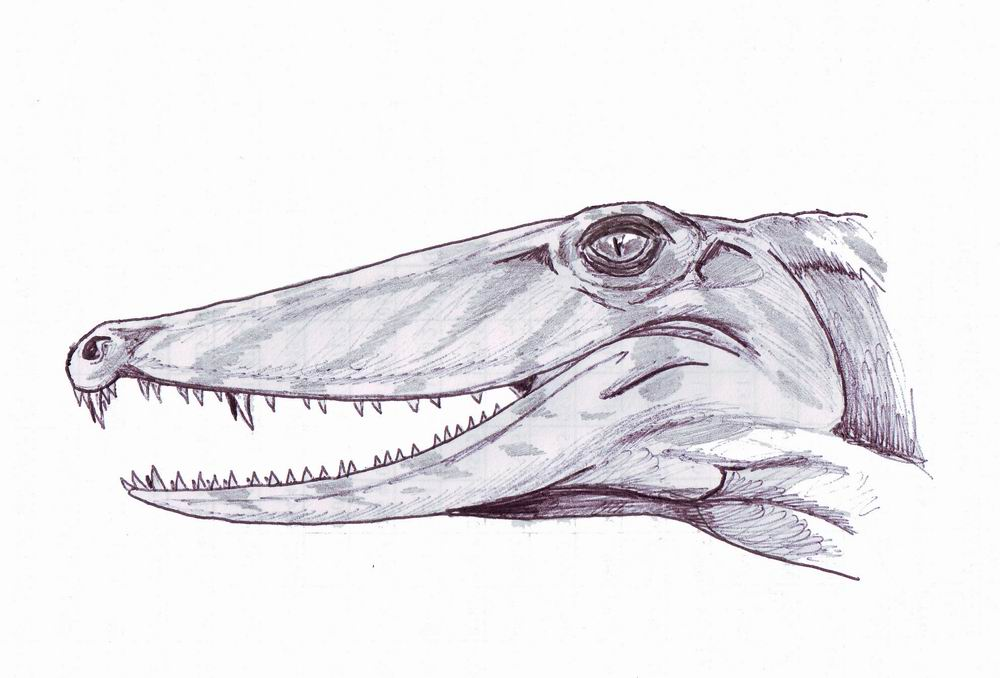
Secodontosaurus head

In 1916 S. W. Williston illustrated parts of the upper and lower jaws of a new, then unnamed genus, specimen FMNH (WM) 573, that he took for a member of the ophiacodontids, noting, however, its "broader, flattened, and cutting teeth" compared to Ophiacodon, which has mainly pointed conical teeth. In his 1925 Osteology of the Reptiles, Williston listed the name Secodontosaurus under the Ophiacodontidae, presumably as the new genus from 1916, but did not provide a description or an explanation. Williston likely chose the name Secodontosaurus "cutting-tooth lizard" for flat, sharp-edged ["secodont"] teeth that contrasted with the conical teeth typically found in ophiacodontids.

In 1936 A. S. Romer made Williston's proposed generic name official but identified Secodontosaurus as a sphenacodontid related to Dimetrodon instead of an ophiacodontid. He also chose Case's Dimetrodon longiramus as the type species and erected the new species S. willistoni from the Clear Fork group, noting its later occurrence and larger size. In 1940 Romer and Price gave priority to Cope's species obtusidens over the synonym longiramus.

When Reisz and others redescribed the skull and reviewed other known material for Secodontosaurus in 1992, they also made the species S. willistoni from the later Clear Fork group a junior synonym of Cope's obtusidens, although this species is sometimes retained as distinct in other sources.

== Evolutionary relationship to Dimetrodon ==
Determining exactly how the members of the Sphenacodontidae — Dimetrodon, Sphenacodon, Ctenospondylus, Cryptovenator, and Secodontosaurus—are related to each other has posed an evolutionary puzzle for paleontologists. Dimetrodon and Secodontosaurus have very similar postcranial skeletons, with a tall dorsal sail supported by thin, rod-like cylindrical neural spines. By contrast, Sphenacodon and Ctenospondylus have a lower dorsal crest formed from flat, blade-like neural spines, relatively low in Sphenacodon and taller in Ctenospondylus. However, Dimetrodon, Sphenacodon, and Ctenospondylus have very similar deep skulls with teeth of different sizes while Secodontosaurus has an unusually low, elongated skull with more uniform teeth. Depending on whether the tall dorsal sail or the deep skull is considered the key character in the phylogeny of sphenacodontids, Secodontosaurus is either in a clade with Dimetrodon that excludes Sphenacodon or is placed on a distinct branch of its own with Dimetrodon and Sphenacodon united in a separate clade.

In one evolutionary scenario, the tall-sailed Secodontosaurus would have evolved a specialized elongated narrow skull from the deep skull found in a tall-sailed common ancestor that it would have shared with the equally tall-sailed Dimetrodon. The deep-skulled, but low-crested, Sphenacodon would be outside the Secodontosaurus-Dimetrodon clade and would retain characteristics of an earlier stage of sphenacodontid evolution before a tall, thin-spined dorsal sail evolved.

Alternative scenarios in which Dimetrodon, Sphenacodon, and Ctenospondylus are united in a deep-skulled clade (Sphenacodontinae) that excludes Secodontosaurus require that either (1) tall, rod-like neural spines are plesiomorphic in the Sphenacodontidae so that the common ancestor of all four genera had a tall dorsal sail that was retained in Secodontosaurus and in Dimetrodon, but was lost by character reversal in Sphenacodon, or (2) the common ancestor of all four genera lacked a tall dorsal sail (and so more closely resembled Sphenacodon), in which case both Secodontosaurus and Dimetrodon would have evolved their very similar-looking tall sails completely independently as an apomorphy.

Most recent analyses favor a monophyletic group Sphenacodontinae composed of Dimetrodon, Sphenacodon, and Ctenospondylus, based mainly on shared characters in the skull and the mandible. According to these phylogenetic hypotheses, the long-skulled Secodontosaurus represents a separate branch at the base of the Sphenacodontidae. More complete fossils of early sphenacodontids such as Cryptovenator (currently known only from jaw material) and other forms from the Late Carboniferous (Pennsylvanian) could help clarify the evolution of the group, and how many times and at what evolutionary stage sails developed.

Cladogram after Fröbisch et al., 2011:

- Sphenacodontia
  - Haptodus
  - - Palaeohatteria
    - Pantelosaurus
    - Ianthodon
    - - Cutleria
      - Sphenacodontoidea
        - Therapsida
        - Sphenacodontidae
          - Secodontosaurus
          - - Cryptovenator
            - - Sphenacodon
              - Ctenospondylus
              - Dimetrodon

== See also ==
- List of pelycosaurs
