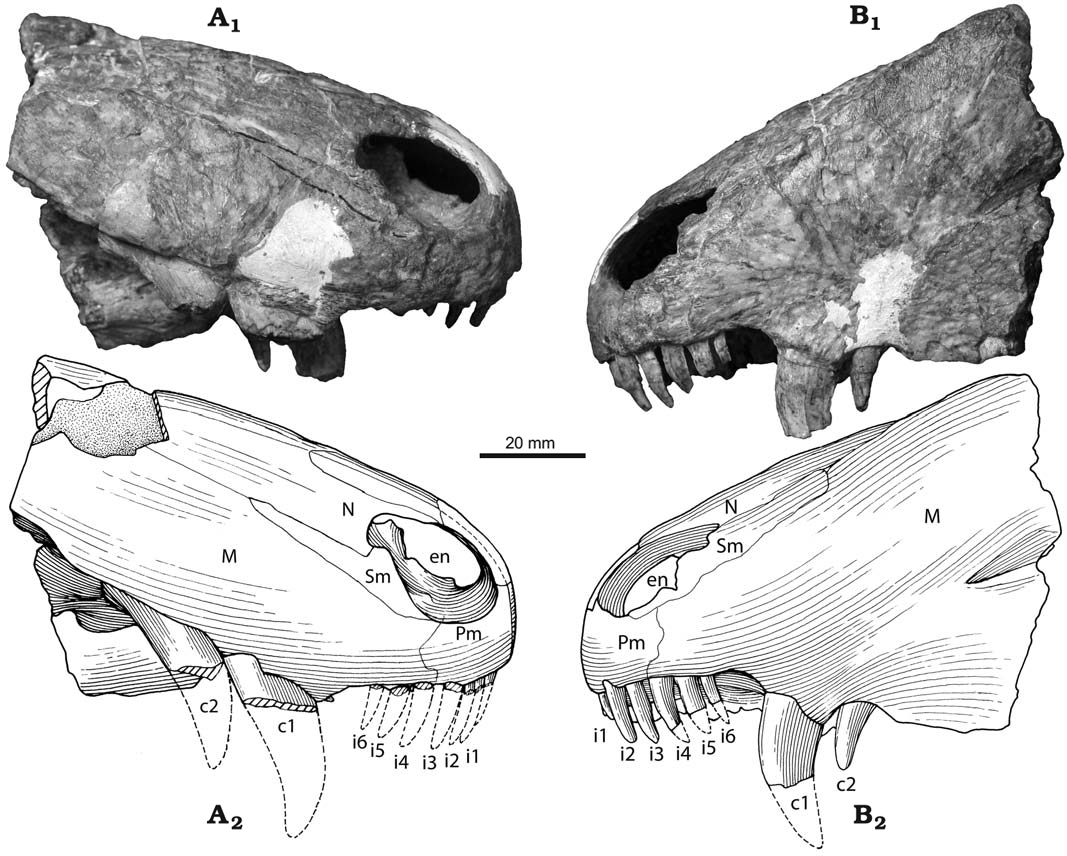
- Holotype skull from the sides

Scientific classification
- Kingdom: Animalia
- Phylum: Chordata
- Clade: Synapsida
- Clade: Therapsida
- Genus: †Raranimus; Liu et al., 2009

Type species
- †Raranimus dashankouensis Liu et al., 2009

= Raranimus =

Raranimus Temporal range: Middle Permian, 272 Ma

Extinct genus of therapsids

Raranimus is an extinct genus of therapsids of the Middle Permian. It was described in 2009 from a partial skull found in 1998 from the Dashankou locality of the Qingtoushan Formation, outcropping in the Qilian Mountains of Gansu, China. The genus is the most basal known member of the clade Therapsida, to which the later Mammalia belong.

== Description ==
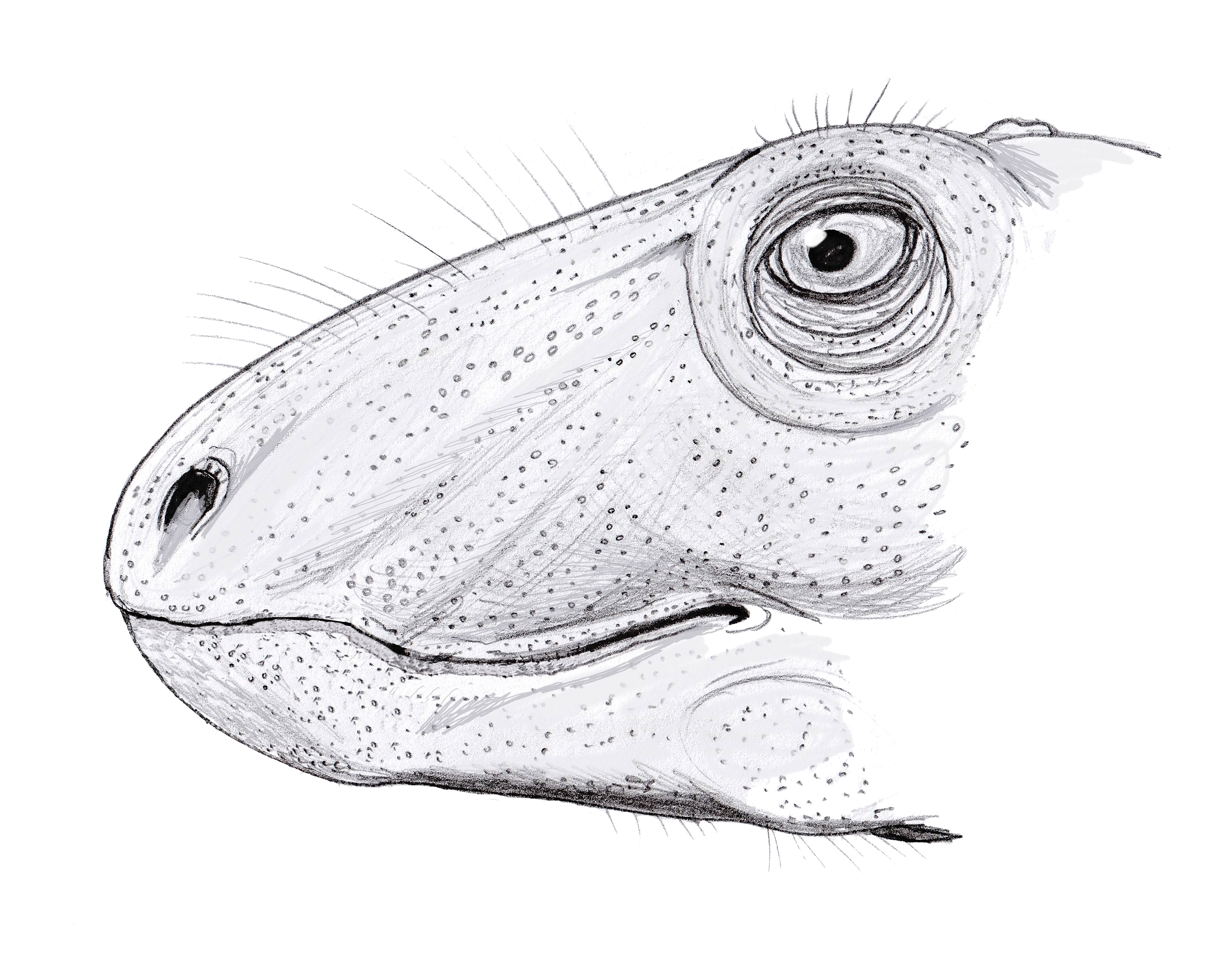
Restoration of the head

Raranimus shares a number of features with later therapsids and ancestral Sphenacodontia. The skull consists of a well preserved rostrum. The teeth suggest a carnivorous lifestyle for Raranimus, as the incisors are recurved and the second canines are serrated on their posterior edges. The incisors are morphologically similar to those seen in more derived theriodonts. The presence of two linguo−labially compressed canines is a diagnostic feature of Raranimus. The presence of two functional canines is characteristic of sphenacodontids, and this condition is seen in no other therapsid other than Raranimus. However, the slender, compressed shape of these canines is a derived characteristic of therapsids, with the canines of similarly sized sphenacodontids being more massively built. The precanines are small and anteriorly serrated, similar to what is seen in the synapsids Dimetrodon and Tetraceratops.

In the palate region of the skull, the anterior process of the vomer ventrally overlies the premaxilla at the anterior margin of the choana. This overlap is also seen in dinocephalians. However, unlike any other therapsid, the choanae are short and extend only from the level of the fourth incisor back to the first canine.

== Phylogenetics ==
According to a phylogenetic analysis conducted along with its initial description, Raranimus is considered to be the basalmost therapsid. There has been some controversy as to whether Tetraceratops is a therapsid or a more basal pelycosaur. If Tetraceratops is a therapsid, as has recently been proposed, it would be the oldest and most basal one known, surpassing Raranimus in age by several million years. However, later studies have questioned the placement of Tetraceratops within Therapsida, and the 2009 phylogenetic analysis using Raranimus places the genus outside of the clade.

Raranimus occurs in strata that were deposited during the early Roadian stage of the Middle Permian. The sphenacodontids were most diverse before the Roadian in the Early Permian, yet therapsids did not appear as a diverse group until near the Roadian-Wordian boundary. This has left a morphological and temporal gap in the fossil record during which the origin of therapsids must have occurred called Olson’s Extinction.

With the general absence of therapsid remains from Olson's Extinction, different hypotheses have developed in order to explain the group's origins and initial diversification. One theory suggests that therapsids diversified quickly through rapid apomorphy accumulation sometime during the gap, while the other proposes that therapsids evolved gradually over the course of up to 35 Ma. Only recently have remains of basal therapsids such as Raranimus been found from China that occur during Olson's Extinction. Other therapsids that are known to have existed during the gap include Sinophoneus and Stenocybus.

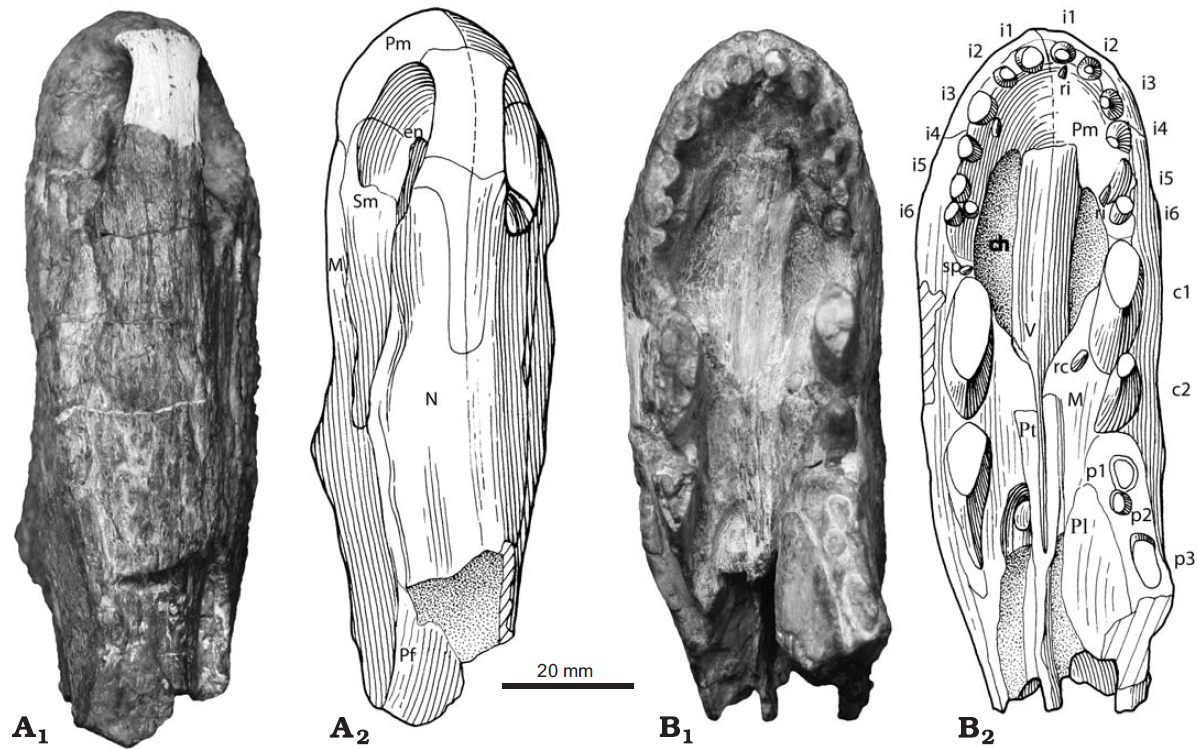
Holotype skull from above and below

Below is a cladogram modified from Liu et al., 2009 depicting the phylogenetic relationships of Raranimus with therapsids that occur in Olson's Gap highlighted:

- Synapsida
  - Haptodus
  - - Dimetrodon
    - Tetraceratops
    - Therapsida
      - Raranimus
      - - - Biarmosuchia
            - Biarmosuchus
            - - Hipposaurus
              - - Herpetoskylax
                - - Lycaenodon
                  - - Lemurosaurus
                    - - Proburnetia
                      - Burnetia
          - Theriodontia
            - to mammals
            - - Gorgonops
              - Lycaenops
              - Cyonosaurus
          - Anomodontia
            - Biseridens
            - - Patranomodon
              - Suminia
        - Dinocephalia
          - - Stenocybus
            - - Syodon
              - Titanophoneus
          - - Estemmenosuchus
            - - Styracocephalus
              - Jonkeria
  Taxa occurring in "Olson's Gap"
