= Niederhäslich Formation =

Geologic formation in Germany

- Stratigraphic range: Sakmarian; ~295–290.1 Ma
- Type: Geological formation
- Unit of: Rotliegend Group

Location
- Region: Saxony
- Country: Germany
- Extent: Saxony Basin

Type section
- Named for: Niederhäslich

The Niederhäslich Formation is a geologic formation in Germany. It preserves fossils dating back to the Sakmarian stage of the Permian period.

== Fossil content ==
=== Synapsids ===
- Ianthasaurus credneri
- Palaeohatteria longicaudata

== See also ==
- List of fossiliferous stratigraphic units in Germany
- Döhlen Formation
