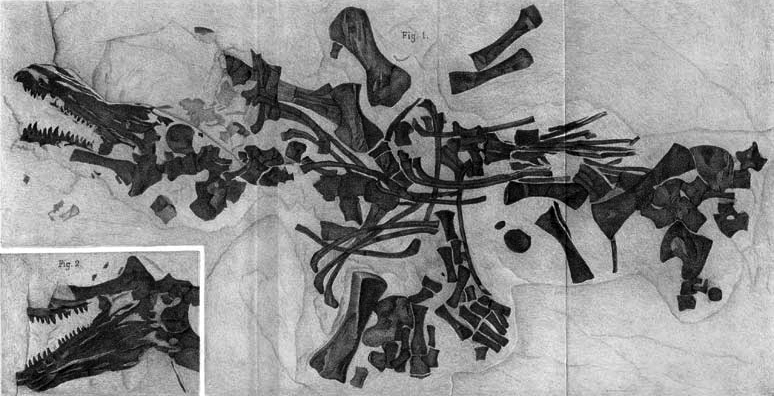
- Illustration of the H. baylei holotype

Scientific classification
- Kingdom: Animalia
- Phylum: Chordata
- Clade: Synapsida
- Clade: Sphenacodontia
- Genus: †Haptodus; Gaudry, 1886

Type species
- †Haptodus baylei Gaudry, 1886

Species
- †H. baylei Gaudry, 1886 (type); †"H". garnettensis? Currie, 1977

Synonyms
- Haptodus longicaudatus Romer and Price, 1940

= Haptodus =

Haptodus Temporal range: Early Permian, 299–296.4 Ma

Extinct genus of synapsids

Haptodus is an extinct genus of basal sphenacodonts, a member of the clade that includes therapsids and hence, mammals. It was at least 1.5 metres (5 ft) in length. It lived in present-day France during the Early Permian. It was a medium-sized predator, feeding on insects and small vertebrates.

== Discovery and taxonomy ==
=== Haptodus baylei ===
Haptodus baylei, the type species of Haptodus, is known only from a single, badly preserved specimen hosted in the Muséum National d'Histoire Naturelle of Paris. It was collected at Les Télots, near Autun of France, from a terrestrial horizon dating to the Asselian stage of the Cisuralian series, about 299-296.4 million years old.

The taxonomy of many pelycosaurs was revised in details by Alfred Sherwood Romer & Llewellyn Price (1940). They synonymized many genera, including Callibrachion (from Margenne near Autun, France), Datheosaurus (from Nowa Ruda of Poland), Palaeohatteria and Pantelosaurus (both from Germany), with Haptodus, but retained these taxa as distinct species. After describing H. garnettensis in 1977, Currie (1979) synonymized all European haptodontines, as well as Cutleria wilmarthi, with the type of the genus, H. baylei. Later, Laurin (1993 and 1994) considered Haptodontinae to represent a polyphyletic grade of basal sphenacodonts, and revalidated Cutleria, Palaeohatteria and Pantelosaurus, while Callibrachion was considered to be a nomen dubium and Datheosaurus was not examined. Laurin also suggested that the type species of the genus H. baylei might be a nomen dubium. His revision has been accepted by subsequent authors.

=== Other species ===
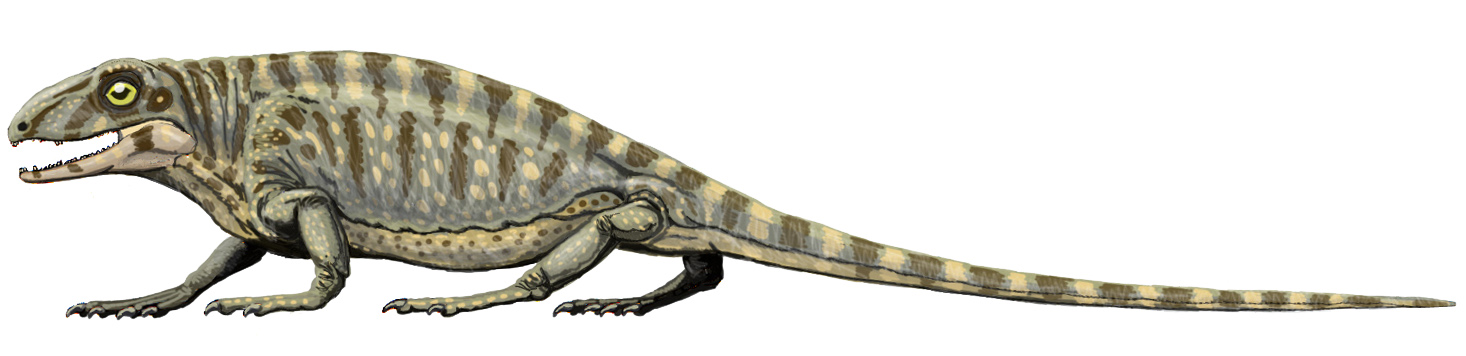
The species "Haptodus" garnettensis, which may belong in a different genus

Haptodus garnettensis was named based on the holotype RM 14156, a partially articulated skeleton (cranial and postcranial) of an immature individual. More than 16 well-preserved specimens of various ontogenetic stages were referred to this species. All specimens came from the Garnett Quarry, located in Anderson County, Kansas. They were collected from the Rock Lake Member of the Stanton Formation (Lansing Group), dating to the late Kasimovian stage of the late Pennsylvanian series, about 305-303.9 million years old.

Another species, Haptodus grandis, was named from a maxilla (Gz 1071) found in Pennsylvanian to Cisuralian deposits in Kenilworth, England, by Roberta Paton in 1974.

In his 2015 dissertation revising the basal Sphenacodontia, Frederik Spindler demonstrated that H. garnettensis and H. grandis do not belong in the same genus as H. baylei and instead represent distinct genera. Spindler referred "H." grandis to a new genus Hypselohaptodus in 2019. He also showed that some specimens referred to "H." garnettensis belong to different taxa; one of these, ROM 43608, was named by Spindler in 2020 as a new genus and species, Kenomagnathus scottae.

== Phylogeny ==
Haptodus in a cladogram after Huttenlocker et al. (2021):

- Eupelycosauria
  - Varanopidae
  - Ophiacodontidae
  - Sphenacomorpha
    - Edaphosauridae
    - Sphenacodontia
      - Haptodus
      - Ianthodon
      - - Palaeohatteria
        - - Pantelosaurus
          - Sphenacodontoidea
