= Döhlen Formation =

Geologic formation in Germany

- Stratigraphic range: Asselian; ~298.9–295 Ma
- Type: Geological formation
- Unit of: Rotliegend Group

Location
- Region: Saxony
- Country: Germany
- Extent: Döhlen Basin

Type section
- Named for: Döhlen

The Döhlen Formation is a geologic formation in Germany. It preserves fossils dating back to the Asselian stage of the Permian period.

== Fossil content ==
- Pantelosaurus saxonicus

== See also ==
- List of fossiliferous stratigraphic units in Germany
- Niederhäslich Formation
