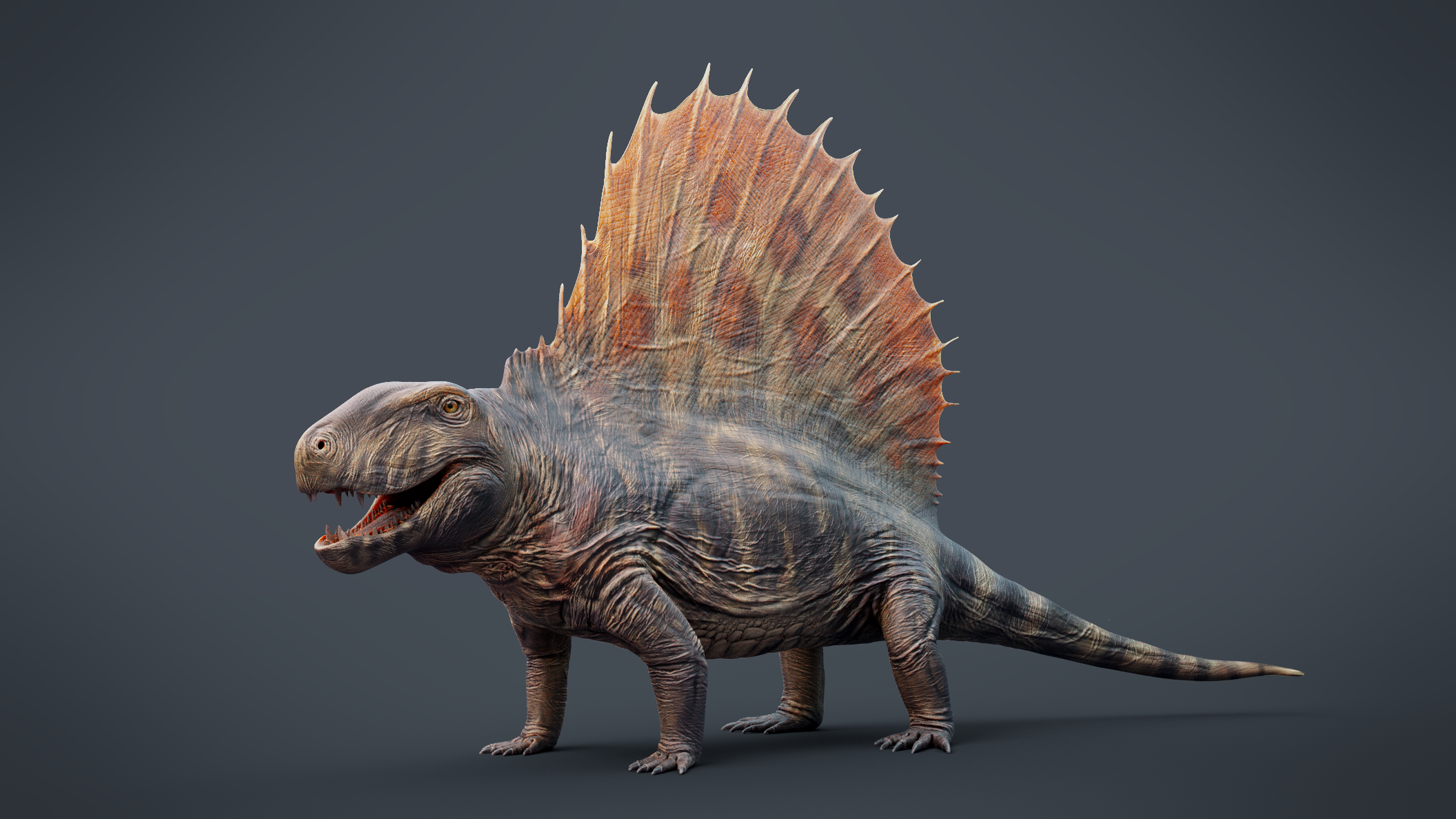
- 3D restoration of Dimetrodon grandis, a sphenacodontid
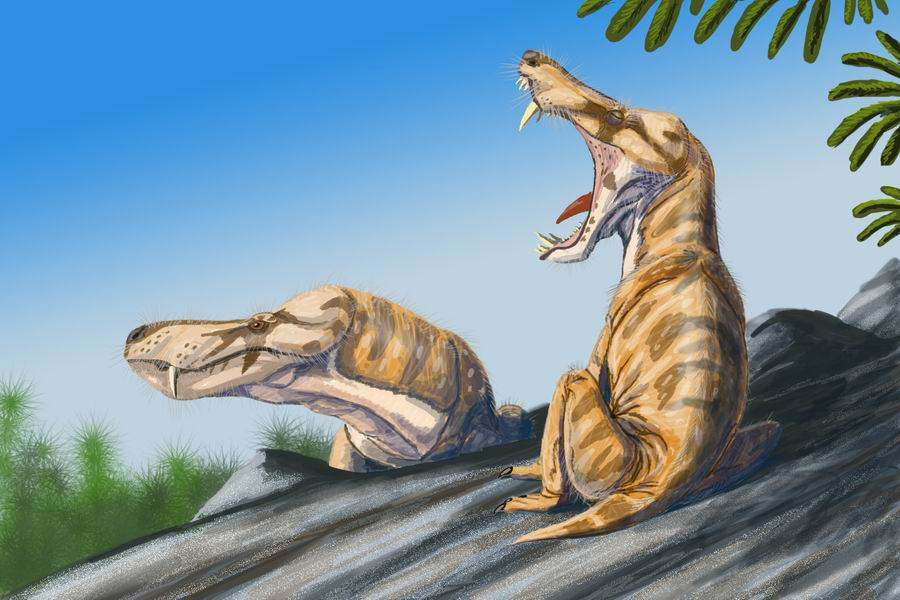
- Restoration of a pair of Alopecognathus angusticeps, a therocephalian therapsid

Scientific classification
- Kingdom: Animalia
- Phylum: Chordata
- Clade: Synapsida
- Clade: Sphenacomorpha
- Clade: Sphenacodontia; Romer & Price, 1940

Subgroups
- †Haptodus; †Hypselohaptodus; †Ianthodon; Pantherapsida Spindler, 2016; †Kenomagnathus; †Tetraceratops; †Palaeohatteriidae; Sphenacodontoidea; †Shashajaia; †Sphenacodontidae; Therapsida

= Sphenacodontia =

Sphenacodontia Temporal range: Late Pennsylvanian-Recent, 304–0 Ma

Clade of synapsids

Sphenacodontia is a stem-based clade of derived synapsids. It was defined by Amson and Laurin (2011) as "the largest clade that includes Haptodus baylei, Haptodus garnettensis and Sphenacodon ferox, but not Edaphosaurus pogonias". They first appear during the Late Pennsylvanian (Upper Carboniferous) epoch. The earliest sphenacodontians were small carnivores, though the group also includes large carnivores, such as the famous Dimetrodon (Sphenacodontidae). The group includes Therapsida, the only living subclade of Synapsida (including living mammals), which is most closely related to Sphenacodontidae within Sphenacodontia as part of the subclade Sphenacodontoidea.

== Characteristics ==
The defining characteristics of Sphenacodontia include a thickening of the maxilla visible on its internal surface, above the large front (caniniform) teeth; and the premaxillary teeth being set in deep sockets. All other (sister group and more primitive) synapsid clades have teeth that are set in shallow sockets. The subclade Sphenacodontoidea is defined by the presence of a frontal orbital process that extends far laterally (outwards to the sides), a deep prefrontal pocket (a cavity present near the upper front/anterodorsal edge of the orbit/eye socket), and teeth on the vomer bone of the roof of the mouth (part of the palatal dentition) are absent.

== Evolution ==
Members of Sphenacodontia first appeared during the Late Carboniferous (Kasimovian) at latest by ~304 million years ago. The earliest members of the group were small-bodied 1–10 kilograms (2.2–22.0 lb) carnivores like Haptodus though Sphenacodontidae would come to include large terrestrial carnivores like Dimetrodon. Therapsida is suggested to have split away from other lineages of Sphenacondontia before the end of the Carboniferous prior to ~299 million years ago. The early evolutionary history of Therapsida is obscure, with no confirmed fossils prior to beginning of the Middle Permian around 274 million years ago, leaving an over 20 million year ghost lineage. Therapsids would come to dominance in the Middle Permian, along with the extinction of all non-therapsid sphenacodontians.

== Classification ==
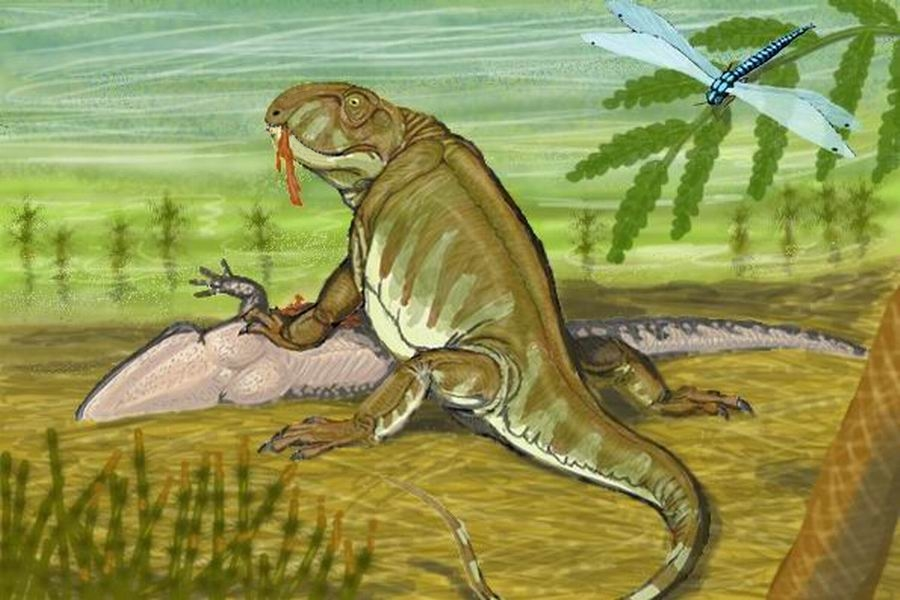
Pantelosaurus, from the Early Permian

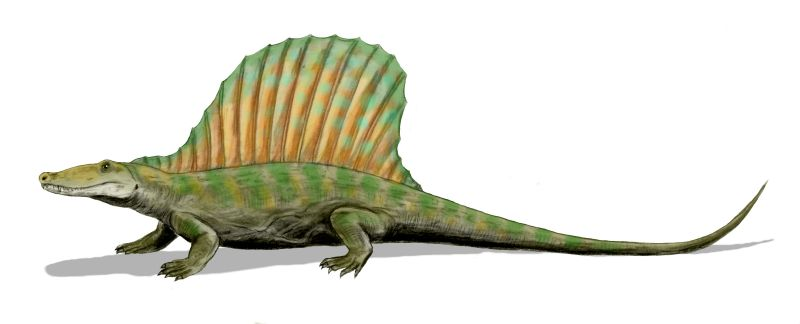
Secodontosaurus, Early Permian

The following taxonomy follows Fröbisch et al. (2011), Benson (2012) and Spinder (2016) unless otherwise noted.

Class Synapsida

- Eupelycosauria
  - Sphenacodontia
    - †Haptodus
    - †Hypselohaptodus
    - †Ianthodon
    - Pantherapsida
      - †Kenomagnathus
      - †Tetraceratops
      - †Palaeohatteriidae
      - Sphenacodontoidea
        - †Shashajaia
        - †Sphenacodontidae
        - Therapsida

=== Phylogeny ===
Sphenacodontia in a cladogram after Fröbisch et al., 2011:

- - † Edaphosauridae
  - Sphenacodontia
    - † Haptodus garnettensis
    - - † Palaeohatteria longicaudata
      - † Pantelosaurus saxonicus
      - † Ianthodon schultzei
      - - † Cutleria wilmarthi
        - Sphenacodontoidea
          - Therapsida
          - Sphenacodontidae
            - † Secodontosaurus obtusidens
            - - † Cryptovenator hirschbergeri
              - - † Sphenacodon
                - † Ctenospondylus
                - † Dimetrodon

Cladogram modified from Huttenlocker et al. (2021):

- Synapsida
  - Caseasauria
  - Eupelycosauria
    - Varanopidae
    - Ophiacodontidae
    - Sphenacomorpha
      - Edaphosauridae
      - Sphenacodontia
        - Haptodus
        - Ianthodon
        - - Palaeohatteria
          - - Pantelosaurus
            - Sphenacodontoidea
              - Sphenacodontidae
                - Cutleria
                - - Secodontosaurus
                  - - Cryptovenator
                    - - - Sphenacodon
                        - Ctenospondylus
                      - Dimetrodon
              - Shashajaia bermani
              - Therapsida
                - Raranimus
                - - Dinocephalia
                  - - Anomodontia
                    - Biarmosuchia
                    - - Gorgonopsia
                      - - Therocephalia
                        - to Mammaliaformes

== See also ==
- Evolution of mammals
