= Hypselohaptodus =

Hypselohaptodus Temporal range: Cisuralian, 299–296.4 Ma

Scientific classification
- Domain: Eukaryota
- Kingdom: Animalia
- Phylum: Chordata
- Clade: Synapsida
- Clade: Sphenacomorpha
- Clade: Sphenacodontia
- Genus: †Hypselohaptodus; Spindler, 2019
- Species: †H. grandis

Binomial name
- †Hypselohaptodus grandis (Paton, 1974)

Extinct genus of synapsids

Hypselohaptodus is a genus of sphenacodont synapsid from the Cisuralian of England. It contains a single species, Hypselohaptodus grandis, and is known only from a single specimen, a partial left maxilla, which is hosted at the Warwick County Museum. It was collected at Kenilworth, Warwickshire, England, from the Kenilworth Sandstone Formation (Warwickshire Group), dating to the earliest Asselian stage of the Cisuralian series, about 299 million years ago.

H. grandis was originally assigned to Haptodus by Roberta Paton in 1974. In 2015 it was determined that H. grandis and Haptodus garnettensis were not congeneric with Haptodus baylei and in 2019 Frederik Spindler reassigned H. grandis to a new genus, Hypselohaptodus.
