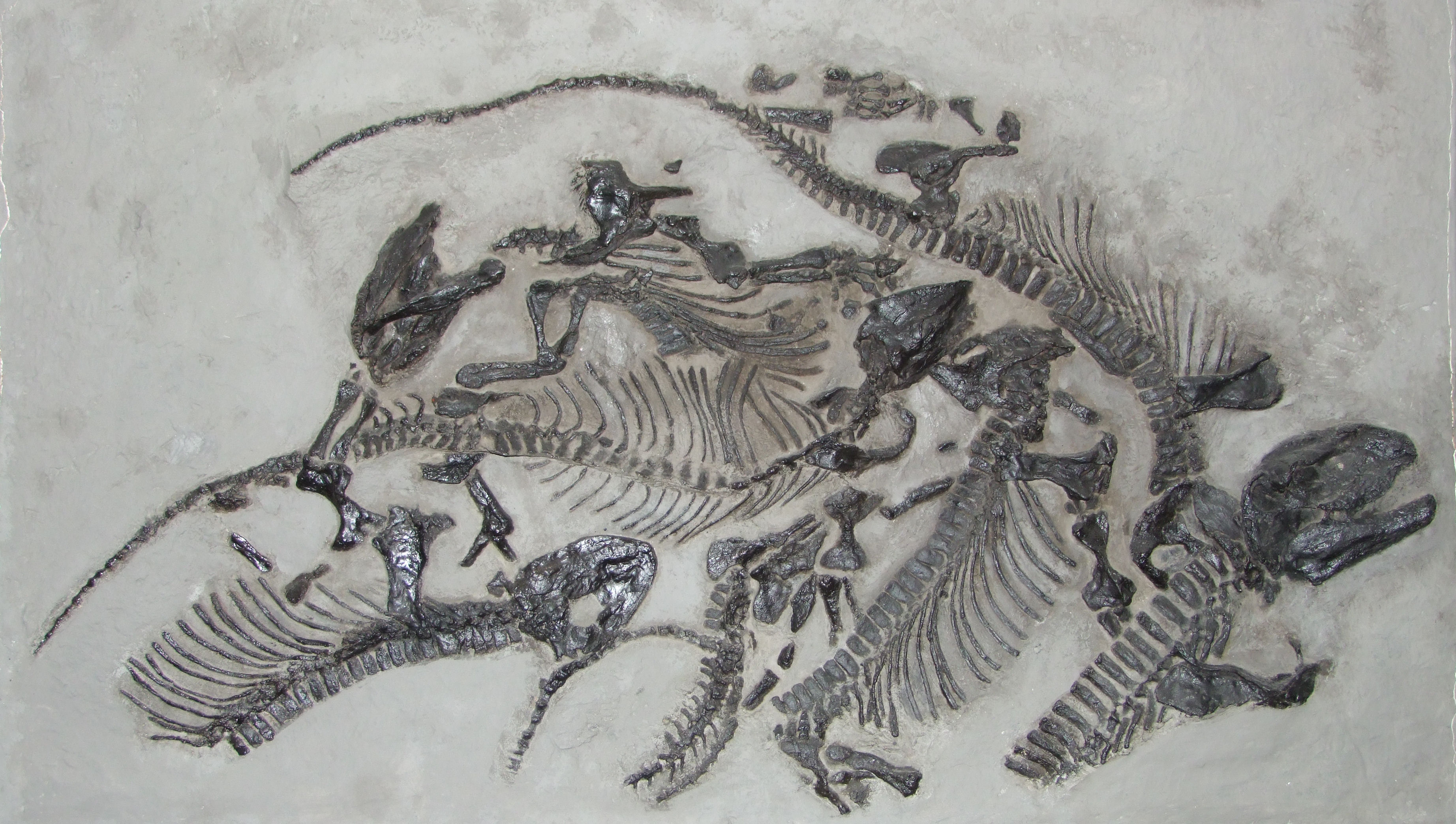
- Fossils

Scientific classification
- Domain: Eukaryota
- Kingdom: Animalia
- Phylum: Chordata
- Clade: Synapsida
- Clade: Sphenacodontia
- Clade: Pantherapsida
- Family: †Palaeohatteriidae
- Genus: †Pantelosaurus von Huene, 1925

Type species
- †Pantelosaurus saxonicus von Huene, 1925

Synonyms
- Haptodus saxonicus Romer & Price, 1940

= Pantelosaurus =

Pantelosaurus Temporal range: Early Permian, Asselian

Extinct genus of synapsids

Pantelosaurus (meaning "complete lizard") is an extinct genus of basal sphenacodonts known from the Early Permian period (Asselian stage) of Saxony, Germany. It contains a single species, Pantelosaurus saxonicus.

== Discovery ==
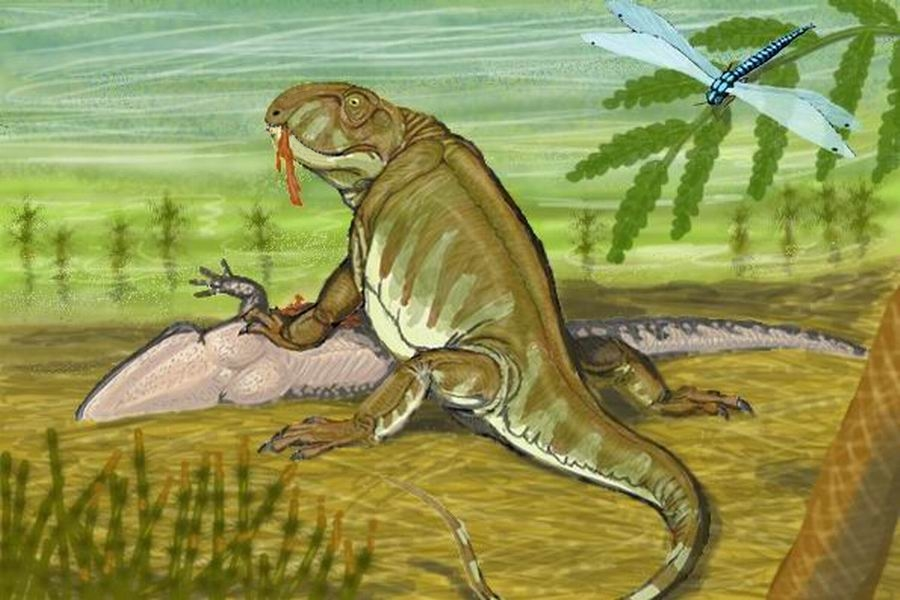
Restoration

Pantelosaurus is known from about 6 individuals including skulls and partial postcranial skeletons. All specimens were collected at Königin-Carola-Schacht locality, in Dresden, from the uppermost part of the Döhlen Formation, lower Rotliegend Group (Döhlen Basin), dating to the Asselian stage of the Cisuralian series, about 299–296.4 million years old.

== Classification ==
Size compared to a human

Pantelosaurus was first described by von Huene (1925) as a pelycosaur. In 1940, Alfred Sherwood Romer and Llewellyn Price revised the taxonomy of pelycosaurs and synonymized Pantelosaurus with Haptodus, creating the new combination Haptodus saxonicus. After describing a new species of Haptodus in 1977, Currie (1979) synonymized all European haptodontines, as well as Cutleria wilmarthi, with the type of the genus, H. baylei. Later, Laurin (1993 and 1994) considered Haptodontinae to represent a polyphyletic grade of basal sphenacodonts, and revalidated Pantelosaurus among other genera and species. His revision has since been accepted. Only three phylogenetic analyses included Pantelosaurus. Laurin (1994), Fröbisch et al. (2011) and Benson (2012) recovered it as a basal sphenacodont, more derived than Haptodus garnettensis (Currie, 1977) or in a polytomy with it. The cladogram below shows Pantelosaurus' phylogenetic position among other synapsids following Benson (2012).

- - Tseajaia campi
  - Limnoscelis paludis
  - Amniota
    - - Captorhinus spp.
      - Protorothyris archeri
    - Synapsida
      - - Ophiacodontidae
        - Varanopidae
      - - Caseasauria
        - - Ianthodon schultzei
          - - Edaphosauridae
            - Sphenacodontia
              - Haptodus garnettensis
              - - Pantelosaurus saxonicus
                - - Therapsida
                  - Sphenacodontidae
                    - Cutleria wilmarthi
                    - - Secodontosaurus obtusidens
                      - - Cryptovenator hirschbergeri
                        - - Dimetrodon spp.
                          - Sphenacodon spp.

Spindler (2016) utilized use of the name Palaeohatteriidae for the clade comprising Palaeohatteria and Pantelosaurus.

== Etymology ==
Pantelosaurus was first described and named by Friedrich von Huene in 1925 and the type species is Pantelosaurus saxonicus. The generic name is derived from the Greek word pantelos "complete, finished" in reference to the nearly complete condition of the original fossil specimens, providing information on the animal's skull and most of its skeleton. The specific name is derived from the name of the Free State of Saxony in which the holotype was found.
