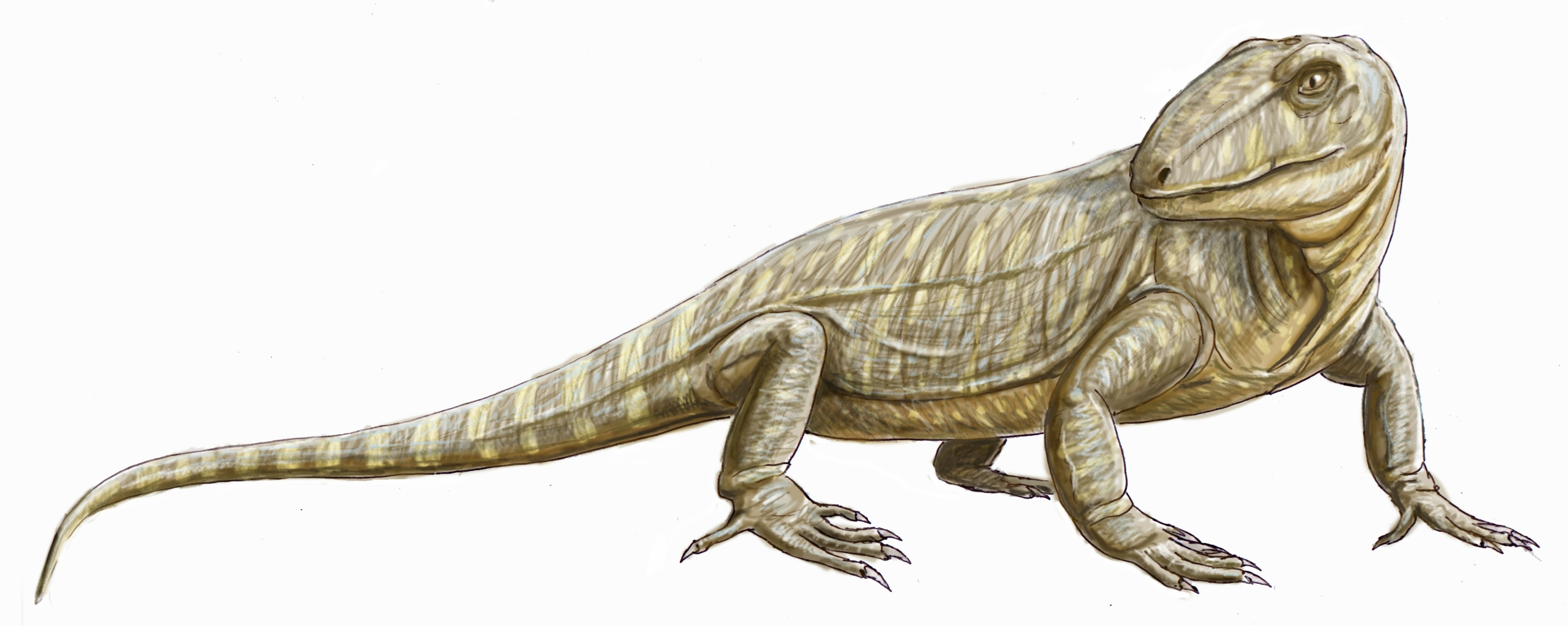
- Restoration

Scientific classification
- Kingdom: Animalia
- Phylum: Chordata
- Clade: Synapsida
- Clade: Sphenacodontoidea
- Family: †Sphenacodontidae
- Genus: †Cutleria; Lewis & Vaughn, 1965
- Species: †C. wilmarthi

Binomial name
- †Cutleria wilmarthi Lewis & Vaughn, 1965

= Cutleria wilmarthi =

Cutleria Temporal range: Early Permian, Sakmarian

Extinct genus of synapsids

Cutleria is an extinct genus of basal sphenacodontid or sphenacodontoid known from the Early Permian period (Sakmarian stage) of Colorado, United States. It contains a single species, Cutleria wilmarthi.

== Discovery ==
Cutleria is known only from the holotype specimen USNM 22099, a fractured but three-dimensionally preserved, a nearly complete skull and articulated partial postcranial skeleton (including vertebral column, ribs and several girdle and limb elements). It was collected at locality 3, near Placerville of San Miguel County, Colorado, from the Cutler Formation, dating to the Sakmarian stage of the Cisuralian series. MCZ 2987, a tip of the rostrum and some teeth collected 2.5 km from the type locality (from localities 11–13), was originally referred to C. wilmarthi by Lewis and Vaughn (1965). A redescription of sphenacodonts by Michel Laurin (1993 and 1994), revealed that it cannot be assigned to any named sphenacodont genus. Although its teeth also bear cutting edges without serrations, they are more bulbous, not as strongly compressed laterally and not curved distally. A new genus was not erected for MCZ 2987, as it is very fragmentary and lacks sufficient diagnostic features.

== Description ==
Cutleria was assigned to the Haptodontinae by Lewis and Vaughn (1965) on the basis of similarities to Haptodus baylei and H. longicaudata (now Palaeohatteria). Currie (1977) described the second haptodontine from North America, Haptodus garnettensis. In 1979, he synonymized all European haptodontines, as well as C. wilmarthi, with H. baylei. Later, Laurin (1993 and 1994) considered Haptodontinae to represent a polyphyletic grade of basal sphenacodonts, and revalidated Cutleria among other genera and species. His revision has been accepted since. Only three phylogenetic analyses included Cutleria. Laurin (1994) and Fröbisch et al. (2011) recovered Cutleria as the sister taxon of Sphenacodontoidea, while the significantly larger analysis of Benson (in press) recovered it as the basalmost sphenacodontid. Benson (in press) listed three synapomorphies between Cutleria and more derived sphenacodontids: their frontal is more than 2.5 times the length of the parietal (as it was noted by Laurin in 1994), a strongly posteroventrally inclined temporal roof (absent in Secodontosaurus), and a lateral centrale that covers the proximal ends of the first-third distal carpals. However, only one additional step was required to place Cutleria outside Sphenacodontidae, as the sister taxon of Sphenacodontoidea (which is the node "Therapsida + Sphenacodontidae"). The cladogram below shows Cutleria phylogenetic position among other synapsids following Benson (2012).

- - Tseajaia campi
  - Limnoscelis paludis
  - Amniota
    - - Captorhinus spp.
      - Protorothyris archeri
    - Synapsida
      - - Ophiacodontidae
        - Varanopidae
      - - Caseasauria
        - - Ianthodon schultzei
          - - Edaphosauridae
            - Sphenacodontia
              - Haptodus garnettensis
              - - Pantelosaurus saxonicus
                - - Therapsida
                  - Sphenacodontidae
                    - Cutleria wilmarthi
                    - - Secodontosaurus obtusidens
                      - - Cryptovenator hirschbergeri
                        - - Dimetrodon spp.
                          - Sphenacodon spp.

== Etymology ==
Cutleria was first described and named by George Edward Lewis and Peter Paul Vaughn in 1965 and the type species is Cutleria wilmarthi. The generic name is derived from the name of the Cutler Formation in which the holotype was found. The specific name honors Verl Richard Wilmarth for finding the holotype, together with Rollin Vickers.
