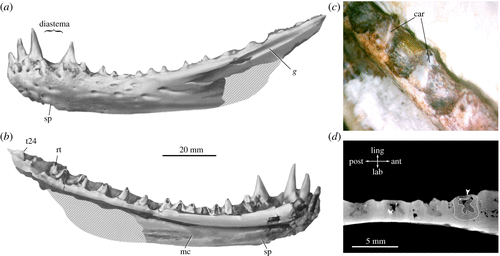
- Diagram of CM 96529, a mandible of S. bermani

Scientific classification
- Kingdom: Animalia
- Phylum: Chordata
- Clade: Synapsida
- Clade: Sphenacodontia
- Genus: †Shashajaia; Huttenlocker et al., 2021
- Species: †S. bermani

Binomial name
- †Shashajaia bermani Huttenlocker et al., 2021

= Shashajaia =

Shashajaia Temporal range: Gzhelian–Sakmarian

Genus of extinct non-mammalian synapsids

Shashajaia is a genus of extinct non-mammalian synapsids from the late Carboniferous to Early Permian. It was one of the earliest members of the group, coming from the Gzhelian stage. It lived in what is now the Halgaito Formation within the larger Cutler group located in the U.S state of Utah. According to a description study, this synapsid is known from well preserved dentary and jaw fragments. Shashajaia shares many similarities to other sphenacodontids including, enlarged (canine-like) anterior dentary teeth, a dorsoventrally deep symphysis and low-crowned, subthecodont postcanines having festooned plicidentine. The study also found that this genus is close to the evolutionary divergence of the Sphenacodontids and the Therapsids, from which mammalian synapsids (including humans) arose from. Based on studies done on its teeth, Paleontologists found that as their prey became more terrestrial, synapsids like Shashajaia adapted to life on land and grew larger teeth to deal with larger herbivores in an evolutionary arms race.

== Etymology and history of research ==
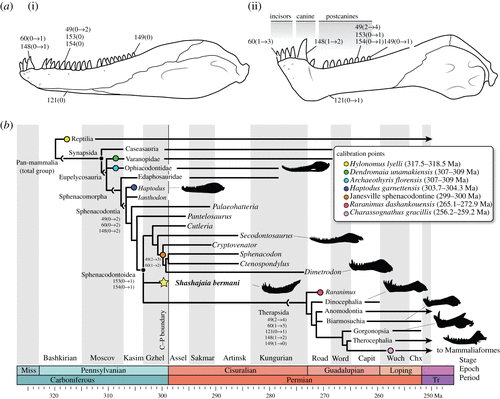
The phylogenetic position of S.bermani in relation to other sphenacodontians.

This creature's name means 'Berman's Bear heart.' The genus name derives from the Navajo words 'shash' (=bear) and 'ajai' (= heart). The species name honours paleontologist David S Berman for his long research on fossils of sphenacodontian synapsids from the Bears Ears region of southern Utah, and helped out with the description study on this creature. Shashajaia was first discovered in 2015 with a dentary fragment that was uncovered in the Birthday Bonebed locality in southeast Utah. A second fossil, a well preserved left dentary including several teeth, was found in 2019.

The fossils were prepared in the University of Southern California Molecular Imaging Center using mechanical pneumatic tools, and were inspected by using computed tomography.
