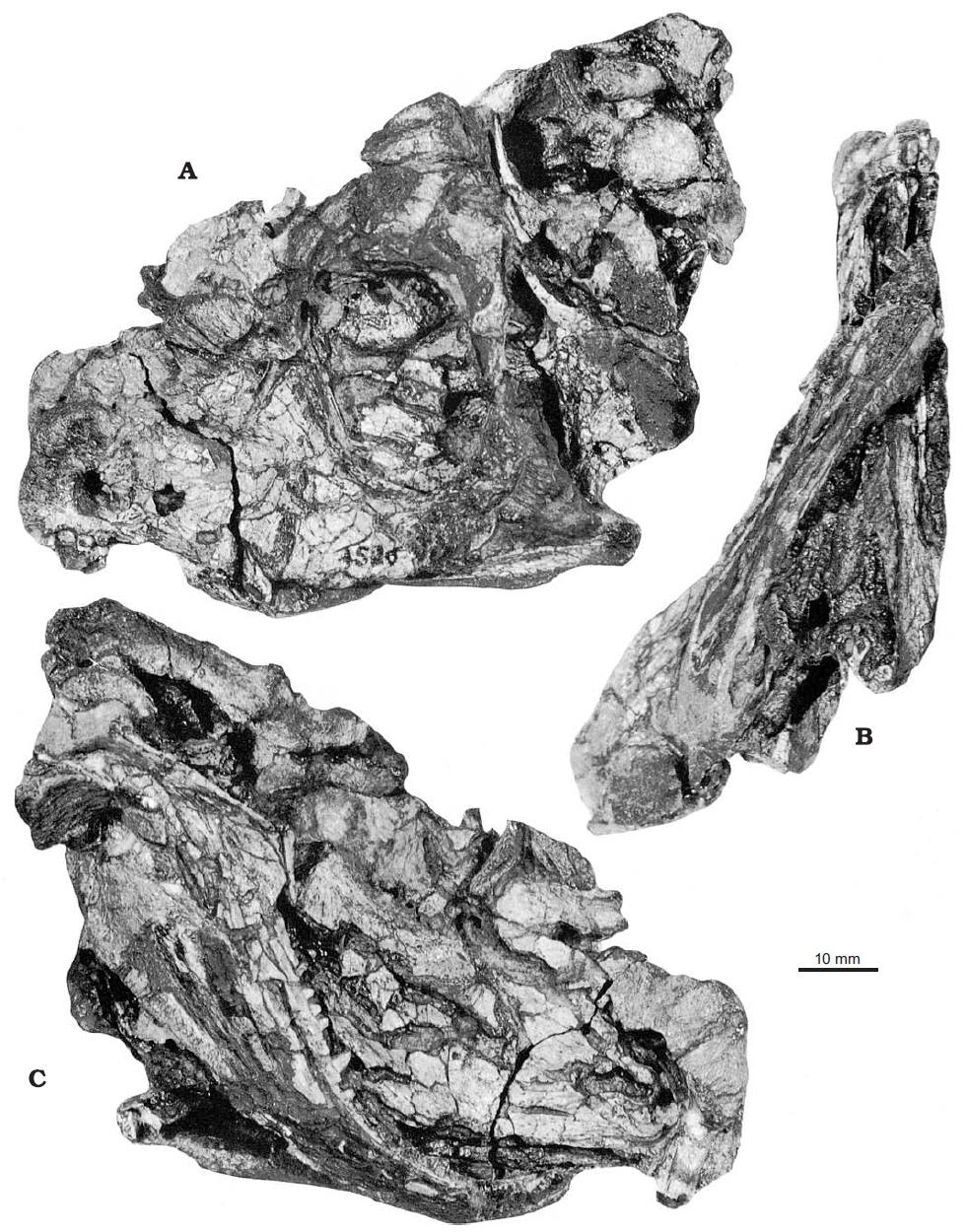
- Holotype

Scientific classification
- Kingdom: Animalia
- Phylum: Chordata
- Clade: Synapsida
- Clade: Pantherapsida
- Genus: †Tetraceratops; Matthew, 1908

Type species
- †Tetraceratops insignis Matthew, 1908

= Tetraceratops =

Tetraceratops Temporal range: Early Permian, 275 Ma

Extinct genus of synapsids

Tetraceratops insignis ("four-horned face emblem") is an extinct synapsid from the Early Permian that was formerly considered the earliest known representative of Therapsida, a group that includes mammals and their close extinct relatives. It is known from a single 90-millimetre-long (3.5 in) skull, discovered in Texas in 1908. According to a 2020 study, it should be classified as a primitive non-therapsid sphenacodont rather than a genuine basal therapsid.

== Description ==
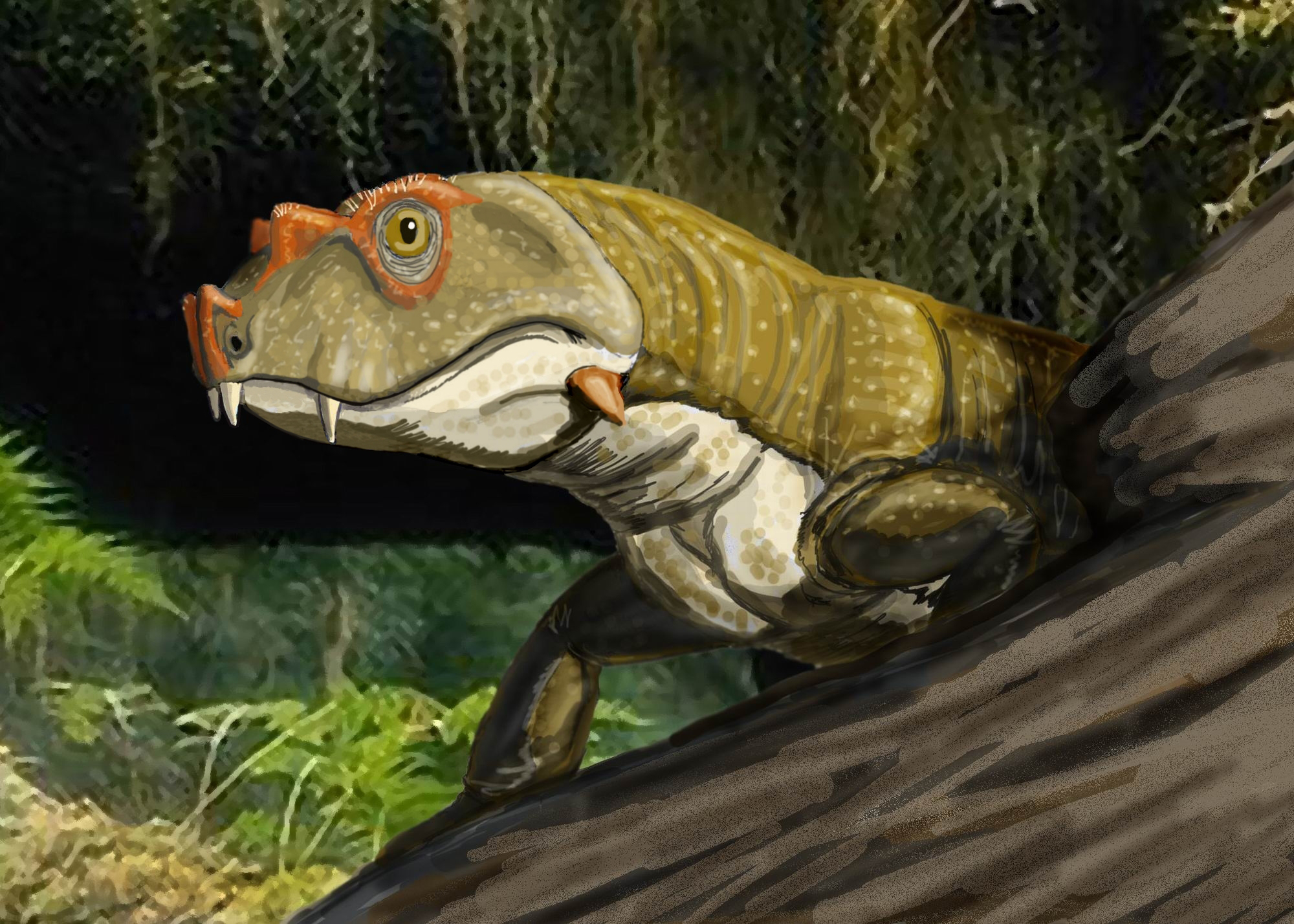
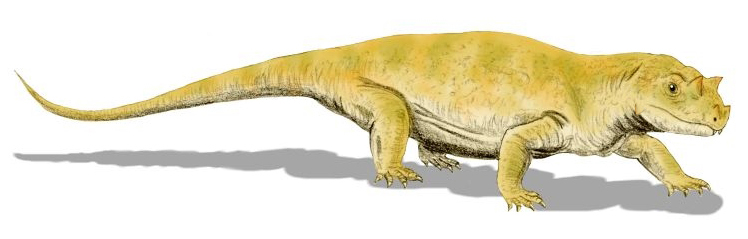
T. insignis reconstructions by Dimitri Bogdanov (top) and Nobu Tamura (bottom)

Tetraceratops is known from a single 90-millimetre-long (3.5 in) skull discovered in Texas in the early 1900s. Contrary to its genus name, Tetraceratops actually has six horns, one pair being on the premaxilla bones, one pair on the prefrontal bones, and one pair on the angular processes of the mandible. When it was discovered and described in 1908, the skull was still embedded in a matrix, and only the premaxilla and prefrontal pairs were visible. In life, thus, it would have resembled a large lizard with four horns on its snout, and a pair of large spines emanating from the corners of its jaw.

In addition to horns, Tetraceratops also had an impressive set of teeth. The second pair of teeth on the maxillary bones were large and fang-like. Likewise the first teeth in the upper jaw were long and dagger-like.

== Classification ==
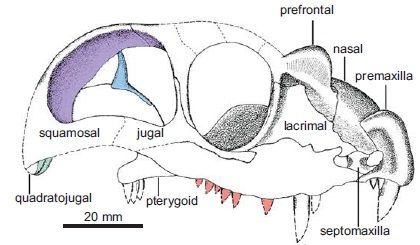
A diagram of the skull

Tetraceratops was originally identified as a member of a group called Pelycosauria, an evolutionary grade of synapsids more basal than therapsids. It has been variously grouped in the family Sphenacodontidae, which is closely related to Therapsida, and Eothyrididae, which is more distantly related. Recent phylogenetic studies classify it as either a pelycosaur-grade synapsid or the basalmost therapsid, rendering its exact phylogenetic placement unclear. The controversy continues; a recent study by Spindler concluded that no convincing morphological evidence could be made for a therapsid placement of Tetraceratops and that this genus was better placed as a basal sphenacodontian,, but a 2026 study supported a close relationship to therapsids.

== See also ==
- List of synapsids
- Evolution of mammals
