= Llewellyn Ivor Price =

Brazilian paleontologist

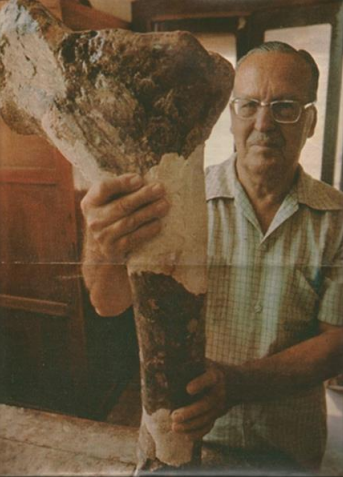
- Price between 1948 and 1960 holding the 1.3 metres (4.3 ft) long femur of a sauropod dinosaur
- Born: 9 October 1905; Santa Maria, Rio Grande do Sul, Brazil
- Died: 9 June 1980 (aged 74); Rio de Janeiro, Brazil
- Scientific career
- Fields: Palaeontology, geology

Llewellyn Ivor Price (9 October 1905 – 9 June 1980) was one of the first Brazilian paleontologists. His work contributed not only to the development of Brazilian but also to global paleontology. He collected Staurikosaurus in 1936, the first dinosaur discovered in Brazil.

== Biography ==
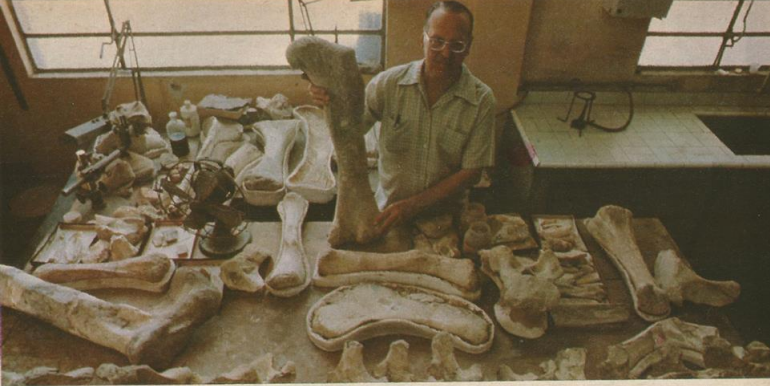
Price in his laboratory preparing the fossils of a titanosaurian sauropod between 1948 and 1960

Price was born in Santa Maria on 9 October 1905. The son of American parents, he studied chemistry and graduated in zoology and geology in the United States. After being professor at Harvard he returned to Brazil.

He died of a heart attack in Rio de Janeiro on 9 June 1980, aged 74.

The Paleontological Research Center "Llewellyn Ivor Price" established in Peirópolis in 1991, was named in honor of Price.

== Awards ==
- In 1980 he was awarded the José Bonifácio de Andrada e Silva prize by the Sociedade Brasileira de Geologia.
