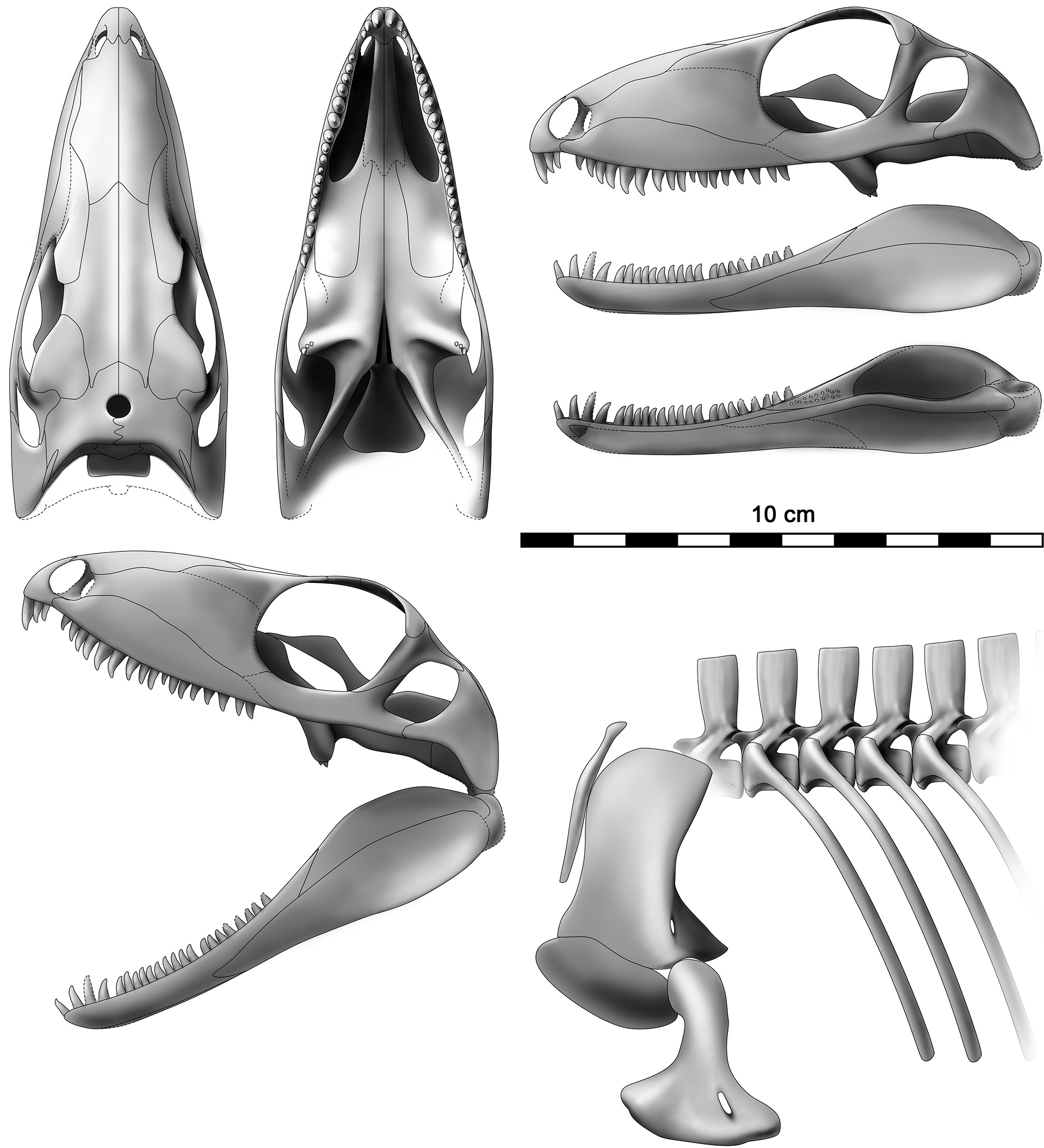
- I. schultzei cranial and skeletal reconstruction

Scientific classification
- Kingdom: Animalia
- Phylum: Chordata
- Clade: Synapsida
- Clade: Eupelycosauria
- Clade: Metopophora
- Clade: Haptodontiformes
- Genus: †Ianthodon; Kissel & Reisz, 2004

Type species
- †Ianthodon schultzei Kissel & Reisz, 2004

= Ianthodon =

Ianthodon Temporal range: Pennsylvanian, ~304 Ma

Extinct genus of synapsids

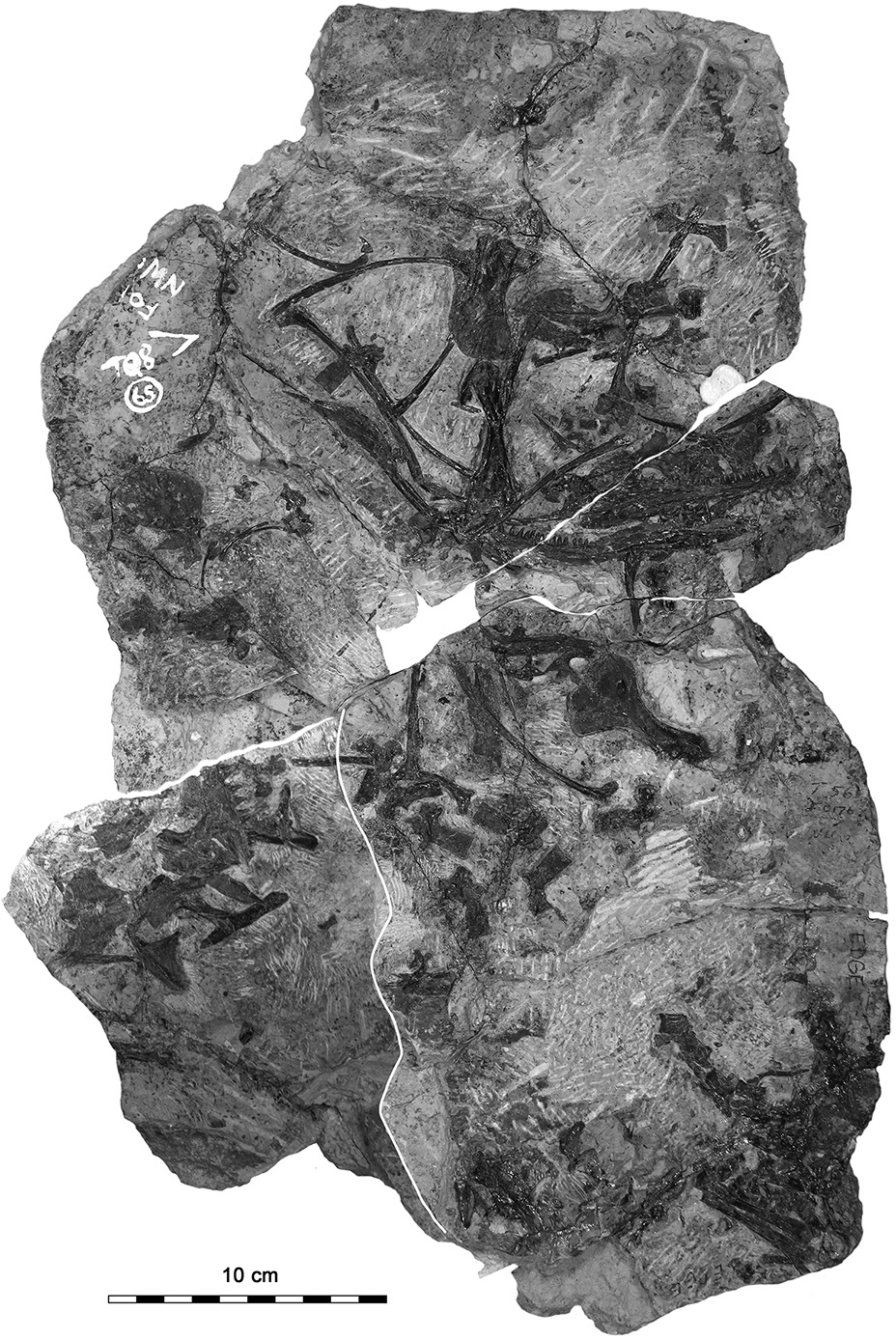
Holotype KUVP 133735

Ianthodon is an extinct genus of basal haptodontiform synapsids from the Late Carboniferous about 304 million years ago. The taxon was discovered and named by Kissel & Reisz in 2004. The only species in the taxon, Ianthodon schultzei, was found by separating it from a block that also contained the remains of Petrolacosaurus and was initially thought to contain elements of Haptodus. The evolutionary significance of the taxon was not realized until a publication in 2015. The fossil of this organism was discovered in Garnett, Kansas.

== Description ==
Ianthodon was first named by Kissel & Reisz in 2004; elements on the holotype slab reidentified as Ianthodon provided more details in 2014. This single juvenile skeleton with delicate bones has an estimated skull length of around 10 cm, which is similar to other taxa, such as Haptodus, during the same development stage. The specimen was easily distinguished from the skeletal element of Petrolacosaurus by the position and the proportion of foramen and supinator process in the humeri.

=== Skull ===
It can be distinguished from Haptodus by its narrower skull and dentition. The higher number of precanine maxillary teeth and the more rectangular shape of the humerus distinguish the holotype of H. garnettensis from that of Ianthodon. The teeth of Ianthodon have wide bases but slender crowns, unusual among contemporary amniotes and indicating that Ianthodon occupied a different trophic niche from the bulbous-crowned Haptodus to which it was closely related. Like other sphenacodonts, Ianthodon has a tall lacrimal bone, and so would have had a proportionally taller snout than more basal synapsids such as varanopids and eothyridids.

== Classification ==
Ianthodon belongs to the clade Sphenacodontia within the clade Sphenacomorpha. Ianthodon has been considered the basalmost-known sphenacodont. The cladogram below follows a cladistic analysis by Spindler and colleagues, 2014.

- - Varanopidae
  - Ophiacodontidae
  - Sphenacomorpha
    - Edaphosauridae
    - Sphenacodontia
      - Ianthodon schultzei
      - - Haptodus garnettensis
        - - Pantelosaurus saxonicus
          - Sphenacodontoidea
            - - Cutleria wilmarthi
              - - Sphenacodon spp.
                - Ctenospondylus spp.
                - Dimetrodon spp.
            - Therapsida
              - Biarmosuchus tener
              - Dinocephalia

== See also ==
- List of pelycosaurs
- List of therapsids
