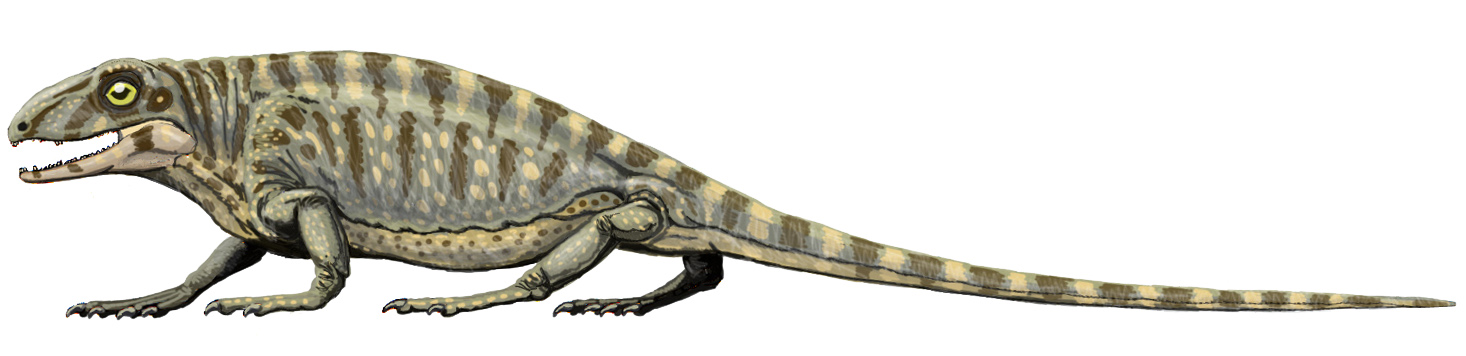
- Restoration of "H". garnettensis

Scientific classification
- Kingdom: Animalia
- Phylum: Chordata
- Clade: Synapsida
- Clade: Sphenacodontia
- Genus: †"Haptodus"
- Species: †"H." garnettensis

Binomial name
- †"Haptodus" garnettensis Currie, 1977

= "Haptodus" garnettensis =

"Haptodus" garnettensis Temporal range: Early Permian, ~304 Ma

Extinct species of synapsid

"Haptodus" garnettensis is an extinct species of basal sphenacodont from the Late Carboniferous (Pennsylvanian) of Kansas, USA.

== Taxonomy ==
The holotype of "Haptodus" garnettensis is RM 14156, a partially articulated skeleton (cranial and postcranial) of immature individual. More than 16 well-preserved specimen of various ontogenetic stages were referred to this species. All specimens came from the Garnett Quarry, located in the Anderson County of Kansas. They were collected from the Rock Lake Member of the Stanton Formation (Lansing Group), dating to the late Kasimovian stage of the late Pennsylvanian series, about 304 million years old.

Laurin (1993, 1994) suggested that Haptodus garnettensis would have to be renamed because he saw Haptodus baylei as a possible nomen dubium. In his dissertation revising taxa assigned to Haptodus, Spindler (2015) proposed that "Haptodus" garnettensis is not congeneric with the Haptodus type species, giving it the nomen ex dissertationae Eohaptodus. He also concluded that two specimens referred to garnettensis, ROM 43608 and ROM 43601, represent new genera and species, the former specimen being named Kenomagnathus by Spindler (2020) and latter specimen being given the nomen ex dissertationae Tenuacaptor reiszi.
