= 2020 in paleontology =

Paleontology or palaeontology is the study of prehistoric life forms on Earth through the examination of plant and animal fossils. This includes the study of body fossils, tracks (ichnites), burrows, cast-off parts, fossilised feces (coprolites), palynomorphs and chemical residues. Because humans have encountered fossils for millennia, paleontology has a long history both before and after becoming formalized as a science. This article records significant discoveries and events related to paleontology that occurred or were published in the year 2020.

== Sponges ==
Name	Novelty	Status	Authors	Age	Type locality	Country	Notes	Images
Endostoma stellata	Sp. nov	Valid	Senowbari-Daryan, Fürsich & Rashidi	Jurassic (Callovian-Oxfordian)	Qale-Dokhtar Limestone Formation	Iran	A calcareous sponge belonging the family Endostomatidae.	
Eoghanospongia	Gen. et sp. nov	Valid	Botting et al.	Silurian (Telychian)		United Kingdom	A hexactinellid sponge. Genus includes new species E. carlinslowpensis. Announced in 2019; the final version of the article naming it was published in 2020.	
Eudea maxima	Sp. nov	Valid	Senowbari-Daryan, Fürsich & Rashidi	Jurassic (Callovian-Oxfordian)	Qale-Dokhtar Limestone Formation	Iran	A calcareous sponge belonging the family Endostomatidae.	
Iniquispongia	Gen. et sp. nov	Valid	Senowbari-Daryan, Fürsich & Rashidi	Jurassic (Callovian-Oxfordian)	Qale-Dokhtar Limestone Formation	Iran	A calcareous sponge belonging the family Endostomatidae. The type species is I. iranica.	
Polyendostoma? irregularis	Sp. nov	Valid	Senowbari-Daryan, Fürsich & Rashidi	Jurassic (Callovian-Oxfordian)	Qale-Dokhtar Limestone Formation	Iran	A calcareous sponge belonging the family Endostomatidae.	
Polyendostoma? regularis	Sp. nov	Valid	Senowbari-Daryan, Fürsich & Rashidi	Jurassic (Callovian-Oxfordian)	Qale-Dokhtar Limestone Formation	Iran	A calcareous sponge belonging the family Endostomatidae.	
Preperonidella tabasensis	Sp. nov	Valid	Senowbari-Daryan, Fürsich & Rashidi	Jurassic (Callovian-Oxfordian)	Qale-Dokhtar Limestone Formation	Iran	A calcareous sponge belonging the family Endostomatidae.	
Seriespongia	Gen. et sp. nov	Valid	Senowbari-Daryan, Fürsich & Rashidi	Middle Jurassic (Callovian)	Esfandiar Limestone Formation	Iran	A calcareous sponge belonging the family Endostomatidae. The type species is S. iranica.	
Shouzhispongia	Gen. et 2 sp. nov	In press	Botting et al.	Ordovician (Hirnantian)		China	A rossellid sponge. Genus includes S. coronata and S. prodigia.	
Spongia mantelli	Nom. nov	Valid	Van Soest, Hooper & Butler	Cretaceous		United Kingdom	A replacement name for Spongia ramosa Mantell (1822).	

== Cnidarians ==
=== New taxa ===
Name	Novelty	Status	Authors	Age	Type locality	Country	Notes	Images
Actinoseris riyadhensis	Sp. nov	Valid	Gameil, El-Sorogy & Al-Kahtany	Late Cretaceous (Campanian)	Aruma	Saudi Arabia	A solitary coral. Announced in 2018; the final version of the article naming it was published in 2020.	
Alichurastrea	Gen. et sp. nov	Valid	Melnikova & Roniewicz	Early Jurassic (probably Pliensbachian)		Tajikistan	A coral. Genus includes new species A. major. Announced in 2020; the final version of the article naming it was published in 2021.	
Alveopora kumadai	Sp. nov	Valid	Niko & Suzuki	Miocene (Langhian)	Katsuta Group	Japan	A species of Alveopora.	
Amplexus gennarenensis	Sp. nov	Valid	Liao, Liang & Luo	Carboniferous (Tournaisian)		China	A rugose coral.	
Anthracomedusa? hoferhauseri	Sp. nov	Valid	Szente	Early Triassic	Werfen Formation	Austria	A box jellyfish.	
Asteroseris arabica	Sp. nov	Valid	Gameil, El-Sorogy & Al-Kahtany	Late Cretaceous (Campanian)	Aruma	Saudi Arabia	A solitary coral. Announced in 2018; the final version of the article naming it was published in 2020.	
Bowanophyllum ramosum	Sp. nov	Valid	Wang, Percival & Zhen	Ordovician (Katian)	Malachis Hill	Australia	A rugose coral.	
Carinthiaphyllum ramovsi	Sp. nov	Valid	Kossovaya, Novak & Weyer	Permian (Asselian)		Slovenia	A rugose coral belonging to the family Geyerophyllidae.	
Colligophyllum	Gen. et comb. nov	Valid	Fedorowski	Carboniferous (Bashkirian)		Ukraine	A rugose coral. The type species is "Lytvophyllum" dobroljubovae Vassilyuk (1960). Announced in 2020; the final version of the article naming it was published in 2021.	
Cunnolites (Plesiocunnolites) riyadhensis	Sp. nov	Valid	Gameil, El-Sorogy & Al-Kahtany	Late Cretaceous (Campanian)	Aruma	Saudi Arabia	A solitary coral. Announced in 2018; the final version of the article naming it was published in 2020.	
Eohydnophora baingoinensis	Sp. nov	Valid	Wang et al.	Early Cretaceous		China	A stony coral.	
Eomicrophyllia	Gen. et sp. nov	Valid	Melnikova & Roniewicz	Early Jurassic (probably Pliensbachian)		Tajikistan	A coral. Genus includes new species E. nalivkini. Announced in 2020; the final version of the article naming it was published in 2021.	
Galliconularia	Gen. et comb. nov	Valid	Van Iten & Lefebvre	Ordovician (Tremadocian)	Saint-Chinian	France	A member of Conulariida. The type species is "Conularia" azaisi Thoral (1935).	
Guembelastreomorpha	Gen. et sp. nov	Valid	Melnikova & Roniewicz	Early Jurassic (probably Pliensbachian)		Tajikistan	A coral. Genus includes new species G. vinogradovi. Announced in 2020; the final version of the article naming it was published in 2021.	
Gurumdynia	Gen. et sp. nov	Valid	Melnikova & Roniewicz	Early Jurassic (probably Pliensbachian)		Tajikistan	A coral. Genus includes new species G. gracilis. Announced in 2020; the final version of the article naming it was published in 2021.	
Hanagyroia	Gen. et sp. nov	Valid	Wang et al.	Early Cambrian	Kuanchuanpu	China	A medusozoan of uncertain phylogenetic placement, possibly representing an intermediate morphological type between scyphozoans and cubozoans. Genus includes new species H. orientalis.	
Hemiagetiolites longiseptatus	Sp. nov	Valid	Wang, Percival & Zhen	Ordovician (Katian)	Malachis Hill	Australia	A tabulate coral.	
Heteroamphiastrea	Gen. et sp. nov	Valid	Kołodziej	Early Cretaceous (Aptian)		Tanzania	A stony coral belonging to the superfamily Heterocoenioidea and the family Carolastraeidae. Genus includes new species H. loeseri.	
Heterostrotion huaqiaoense	Sp. nov	Valid	Denayer et al.	Early Carboniferous		China	A rugose coral	
Krynkaphyllum	Gen. et 2 sp. nov	Valid	Fedorowski	Carboniferous (Bashkirian)		Ukraine	A rugose coral. The type species is K. multiplexum; genus also includes K. validum. Announced in 2020; the final version of the article naming it was published in 2021.	
Martsaphyton	Gen. et sp. nov	Valid	Tinn, Vinn & Ainsaar	Ordovician (Darriwilian)		Estonia	A member of Medusozoa of uncertain phylogenetic placement. The type species is M. moxi.	
Michelinia flugeli	Sp. nov	Valid	Niko & Badpa	Carboniferous (Bashkirian)	Sardar Formation	Iran	A tabulate coral belonging to the order Favositida and the family Micheliniidae.	
Nancygyra	Gen. et sp. nov	In press	Bosellini & Stolarski in Bosellini et al.	Eocene (Ypresian)		Italy	A member of the family Euphylliidae. The type species is N. dissepimentata.	
Neosyringaxon michelini	Sp. nov	Valid	Weyer & Rohart	Devonian (Frasnian)		France	A rugose coral belonging to the family Petraiidae	
Paramixogonaria wangyouensis	Sp. nov	Valid	Liao & Liang	Devonian (Givetian)	Wenglai	China	A rugose coral.	
Pinacomorpha	Gen. et sp. nov	Valid	Melnikova & Roniewicz	Early Jurassic (probably Pliensbachian)		Tajikistan	A coral. Genus includes new species P. apimelos. Announced in 2020; the final version of the article naming it was published in 2021.	
Placophyllia baingoinensis	Sp. nov	Valid	Wang et al.	Early Cretaceous		China	A stony coral. Originally described as a species of Placophyllia, but subsequently transferred to the genus Sonoraphyllia.	
Placophyllia amnica	Sp. nov	Valid	Melnikova & Roniewicz	Early Jurassic (probably Pliensbachian)		Tajikistan	A placophylliid coral. Announced in 2020; the final version of the article naming it was published in 2021.	
Protokionophyllum feninoense	Sp. nov	Valid	Fedorowski	Carboniferous (Bashkirian)		Ukraine	A rugose coral. Announced in 2020; the final version of the article naming it was published in 2021.	
Protostephanastrea	Gen. et sp. nov	Valid	Melnikova & Roniewicz	Early Jurassic (probably Pliensbachian)		Tajikistan	An actinastraeid coral. Genus includes new species P. leveni. Announced in 2020; the final version of the article naming it was published in 2021.	
Psenophyllia	Gen. et comb. nov	Valid	Melnikova & Roniewicz	Early Jurassic (probably Pliensbachian)		Tajikistan	A coral. The type species is "Cylindrosmilia" longa Melnikova (1989). Announced in 2020; the final version of the article naming it was published in 2021.	
Rotiphyllum xinjiangense	Sp. nov	Valid	Liao, Liang & Luo	Carboniferous (Tournaisian)		China	A rugose coral.	
Sanidophyllum dubium	Sp. nov	Valid	Yu et al.	Devonian (Emsian)	Mia Le	Vietnam	A rugose coral belonging to the family Breviphyllidae. Announced in 2020; the final version of the article naming was published in 2021.	
Sedekastrea	Gen. et sp. nov	Valid	Melnikova & Roniewicz	Early Jurassic (probably Pliensbachian)		Tajikistan	A coral. Genus includes new species S. djalilovi. Announced in 2020; the final version of the article naming it was published in 2021.	
Siphonophyllia khenifrense	Sp. nov		Rodríguez, Said & Somerville in Rodríguez et al.	Carboniferous (Viséan)	Azrou-Khenifra	Morocco	A rugose coral belonging to the family Cyathopsidae	
Stylimorpha	Gen. et sp. nov	Valid	Melnikova & Roniewicz	Early Jurassic (probably Pliensbachian)		Tajikistan	A placophylliid coral. Genus includes new species S. kardjilgensis. Announced in 2020; the final version of the article naming it was published in 2021.	
Stylina namcoensis	Sp. nov	Valid	Wang et al.	Early Cretaceous		China	A stony coral.	
Stylostrotion houi	Sp. nov	Valid	Denayer et al.	Carboniferous (Viséan)		China	A rugose coral	
Syringopora iranica	Sp. nov	Valid	Niko & Badpa	Carboniferous (Serpukhovian)	Sardar Formation	Iran	A tabulate coral belonging to the order Auloporida and the family Syringoporidae.	

=== Research ===
- Revision of tabulate-like fossils from before the latest Middle Ordovician is published by Elias, Lee & Pratt (2020), who reject the interpretation of these fossils as true tabulate corals.
- Drake, Whitelegge & Jacobs (2020) report the first recovery, sequencing, and identification of fossil biomineral proteins from a Pleistocene fossil invertebrate (the stony coral Orbicella annularis).

== Bryozoans ==
Name	Novelty	Status	Authors	Age	Type locality	Country	Notes	Images
Anastomopora blankenheimensis	Sp. nov	Valid	Ernst	Devonian		Germany		
Anastomopora minor	Sp. nov	Valid	Ernst	Devonian		Germany		
Anomalotoechus parvus	Sp. nov	Valid	Ernst, Bahrami & Parast	Devonian (Famennian)	Bahram	Iran	A member of Trepostomata belonging to the group Amplexoporina and to the family Atactotoechidae.	
Asperopora sinensis	Sp. nov	Valid	Ernst et al.	Silurian (Telychian)	Hanchiatien	China	A trepostome bryozoan.	
Biforicula collinsi	Sp. nov	Valid	Taylor	Early Cretaceous (Albian)	Gault	United Kingdom		
Cheethamia volgaensis	Sp. nov	Valid	Koromyslova & Seltser	Late Cretaceous (Maastrichtian)		Russia (Saratov Oblast)	A member of Cheilostomata	
Cribrilaria profunda	Sp. nov	Valid	Rosso, Di Martino & Ostrovsky	Pleistocene		Italy	A member of the family Cribrilinidae.	
Dianulites altaicus	Sp. nov	Valid	Koromyslova & Sennikov	Ordovician (Sandbian)		Russia (Altai Republic)	A member of Esthonioporata.	
Dyscritella kalmardensis	Sp. nov	Valid	Ernst & Gorgij	Carboniferous (Pennsylvanian)	Siliciclastic Imagh	Iran	A member of Trepostomata belonging to the group Amplexoporina and to the family Dyscritellidae. Announced in 2019; the final version of the article naming it was published in 2020.	
Dyscritella multiporata	Sp. nov	Valid	Ernst & Gorgij	Carboniferous (Pennsylvanian)	Siliciclastic Imagh	Iran	A member of Trepostomata belonging to the group Amplexoporina and to the family Dyscritellidae. Announced in 2019; the final version of the article naming it was published in 2020.	
Figularia spectabilis	Sp. nov	Valid	Rosso, Di Martino & Ostrovsky	Pleistocene		Italy	A member of the family Cribrilinidae.	
Filites bakharevi	Sp. nov	Valid	Mesentseva in Mesentseva & Udodov	Devonian (Emsian)		Russia		
Filites fragilis	Sp. nov	Valid	Udodov in Mesentseva & Udodov	Devonian (Emsian)		Russia		
Filites regularis	Sp. nov	Valid	Mesentseva in Mesentseva & Udodov	Devonian (Emsian)		Russia		
Filites vulgaris	Sp. nov	Valid	Udodov in Mesentseva & Udodov	Devonian (Emsian)		Russia		
Glabrilaria transversocarinata	Sp. nov	Valid	Rosso, Di Martino & Ostrovsky	Pleistocene		Italy	A member of the family Cribrilinidae.	
Hemiphragma insolitum	Sp. nov	Valid	Koromyslova & Fedorov	Ordovician (Dapingian)		Russia	A trepostome bryozoan.	
Microporella tanyae	Sp. nov	Valid	Di Martino, Taylor & Gordon	Pliocene	Yorktown	United States (Virginia)	A member of the family Microporellidae.	
Moorephylloporina parvula	Sp. nov	Valid	Ernst et al.	Silurian (Telychian)	Hanchiatien	China	A fenestrate bryozoan.	
Parastenodiscus sinaiensis	Sp. nov	In press	Ernst et al.	Carboniferous (Mississippian)		Egypt	A member of Trepostomata	
Planopora	Gen. et sp. nov	Valid	Koromyslova & Fedorov	Ordovician (Dapingian)		Russia	A bifoliate cystoporate. Genus includes new species P. volkhovensis.	
Rhombopora aryani	Sp. nov	Valid	Ernst & Gorgij	Carboniferous (Pennsylvanian)	Siliciclastic Imagh	Iran	A member of Cryptostomata belonging to the group Rhabdomesina and to the family Rhomboporidae. Announced in 2019; the final version of the article naming it was published in 2020.	
Taylorus patagonicus	Sp. nov	Valid	Pérez et al.	Early Miocene		Argentina	A member of the family Escharinidae. Announced in 2020; the final version of the article naming it was published in 2021.	
Trematopora jiebeiensis	Sp. nov	Valid	Ernst et al.	Silurian (Telychian)	Hanchiatien	China	A trepostome bryozoan.	
Trematopora tenuis	Sp. nov	Valid	Ernst et al.	Silurian (Telychian)	Hanchiatien	China	A trepostome bryozoan.	
Zefrehopora	Gen. et sp. nov	Valid	Ernst, Bahrami & Parast	Devonian (Famennian)	Bahram	Iran	A member of Trepostomata belonging to the group Amplexoporina and to the family Eridotrypellidae. The type species is Z. asynithis.	

== Brachiopods ==
=== New taxa ===
Name	Novelty	Status	Authors	Age	Type locality	Country	Notes	Images
Altiplanotoechia	Gen. et sp. nov	Valid	Colmenar in Colmenar & Hodgin	Ordovician	Umachiri	Peru	A polytoechioid brachiopod. Genus includes new species A. hodgini.	
Ametoria nassichuki	Sp. nov	Valid	Waterhouse	Permian	Assistance Formation	Canada (Nunavut)	A member of Productida belonging to the family Echinoconchidae.	
Anemonaria robusta	Sp. nov	Valid	Waterhouse	Permian	Assistance Formation	Canada (Nunavut)	A member of Productida belonging to the family Paucispiniferidae.	
Balkhasheconcha thorsteinssoni	Sp. nov	Valid	Waterhouse	Permian	Assistance Formation	Canada (Nunavut)	A member of Productida belonging to the superfamily Scacchinelloidea and the family Rhamnariidae.	
Beaussetithyris	Gen. et sp. nov		Gaspard & Charbonnier	Late Cretaceous (Santonian)		France	A member of Rhynchonellida belonging to the family Cyclothyrididae. The type species is B. asymmetrica.	
Betaneospirifer politus	Sp. nov	Valid	Waterhouse	Permian	Trold Fiord Formation	Canada (Nunavut)	A member of Spiriferida belonging to the family Neospiriferidae.	
Biconvexiella saopauloensis	Sp. nov	In press	Simões et al.	Late Paleozoic	Taciba	Brazil		
Bockeliena	Gen. et comb. nov	Valid	Baarli	Silurian (Rhuddanian)		United Kingdom	A member of the family Atrypinidae; a new genus for "Atrypa" flexuosa Marr & Nicholson (1888).	
Brevilamnulella minuta	Sp. nov	Valid	Jin & Blodgett	Late Ordovician		United States (Alaska)		
Callaiapsida ustritskii	Sp. nov	Valid	Waterhouse	Permian	Assistance Formation	Canada (Nunavut)	A member of Rhynchonellida belonging to the superfamily Stenoscismatoidea and the family Psilocamaridae.	
Catatonaria transversaria	Sp. nov	Valid	Waterhouse	Permian	Assistance Formation	Canada (Nunavut)	A member of Spiriferida belonging to the superfamily Elitoidea and the family Phricodothyridae.	
Chilcatreta lariojana	Sp. nov	Valid	Lavié & Benedetto	Ordovician	Suri	Argentina	A siphonotretid brachiopod. Announced in 2019; the final version of the article naming it was published in 2020.	
Chinellirostra	Gen. et sp. nov	Valid	Baranov, Qiao & Blodgett	Devonian (Givetian)		China	A member of the family Stringocephalidae. Genus includes new species C. rara. Announced in 2020; the final version of the article naming was published in 2021.	
Cimmeriella coyneae	Sp. nov	Valid	Waterhouse	Permian	Takhandit Formation	Canada (Yukon)	A member of Productida belonging to the family Anidanthidae.	
Contortithyris	Gen. et sp. nov		Gaspard & Charbonnier	Late Cretaceous (Santonian)	Micraster	France	A member of Rhynchonellida belonging to the family Cyclothyrididae. The type species is C. thermae.	
Costasulculus	Gen. et sp. nov	Valid	Waterhouse	Permian (Wuchiapingian)	Episkopi Formation	Greece	A member of Spiriferinida belonging to the superfamily Pennospiriferinoidea and the family Paraspiriferinidae. The type species is C. claphami.	
Cyclothyris cardiatelia	Sp. nov	In press	Berrocal-Casero, Barroso-Barcenilla & Joral	Late Cretaceous (Coniacian)		Spain	A member of Rhynchonellida	
Cyclothyris grimargina	Sp. nov		Gaspard & Charbonnier	Late Cretaceous (Campanian)	Micraster	France	A member of Rhynchonellida belonging to the family Cyclothyrididae	
Cyclothyris nekvasilovae	Sp. nov	Valid	Berrocal-Casero, Joral & Barroso-Barcenilla	Late Cretaceous (Cenomanian)		Czech Republic	A member of Rhynchonellida belonging to the family Cyclothyrididae. Announced in 2020; the final version of the article naming it was published in 2021.	
Cyclothyris segurai	Sp. nov	In press	Berrocal-Casero, Barroso-Barcenilla & Joral	Late Cretaceous (Coniacian)		Spain	A member of Rhynchonellida	
Derbyia semicircularis	Sp. nov	Valid	Waterhouse	Permian	Assistance Formation	Canada (Nunavut)	A member of the superfamily Orthotetoidea belonging to the family Derbyiidae.	
Dihelictera engerensis	Sp. nov	Valid	Baarli	Ordovician/Silurian boundary	Solvik	Norway	A member of the family Atrypidae.	
Dogdoa talyndzhensis	Sp. nov	Valid	Baranov	Early Devonian		Russia	A member of Rhynchonellida.	
Dyoros gentilis	Sp. nov	Valid	Waterhouse	Permian	Assistance Formation	Canada (Nunavut)	A member of the family Rugosochonetidae.	
Dyoros modestus	Sp. nov	Valid	Waterhouse	Permian		Canada	A member of the family Rugosochonetidae.	
Balkhasheconcha thorsteinssoni	Sp. nov	Valid	Waterhouse	Permian	Assistance Formation	Canada (Nunavut)	A member of Productida belonging to the superfamily Scacchinelloidea and the family Rhamnariidae.	
Echinalosia pondosus	Sp. nov	Valid	Waterhouse	Permian	Trold Fiord Formation	Canada	A member of Productida belonging to the superfamily Strophalosioidea and the family Dasyalosiidae.	
Elliptoglossa kononovae	Sp. nov	Valid	Smirnova & Zhegallo	Devonian (Famennian)		Russia	A member of Lingulida.	
Enriquetoechia	Gen. et sp. nov	Valid	Colmenar & Hodgin	Ordovician	Umachiri	Peru	A polytoechioid brachiopod. Genus includes new species E. umachiriensis.	
Eoobolus incipiens	Sp. nov	In press	Zhang, Popov, Holmer & Zhang in Zhang et al.	Cambrian	Ajax Limestone; Dengying Formation; Mernmerna Formation; Wilkawillina Limestone	Australia; China	A member of Linguloidea.	
Euroatrypa? sigridi	Sp. nov	Valid	Baarli	Ordovician/Silurian boundary	Solvik	Norway	A member of the family Atrypinidae.	
Famatinobolus	Gen. et sp. nov	Valid	Lavié & Benedetto	Ordovician	Suri	Argentina	An obolid brachiopod. Genus includes new species F. cancellatum. Announced in 2019; the final version of the article naming it was published in 2020.	
Fissulina	Gen. et sp. nov	Valid	Waterhouse	Permian	Sabine Bay Formation	Canada (Nunavut)	A member of Strophomenata belonging to the superfamily Orthotetoidea and the family Schuchertellidae. The type species is F. delicatula.	
Germanoplatidia	Gen. et comb. nov	Valid	Dulai & Von der Hocht	Oligocene (Chattian)		Germany	A member of Terebratulida belonging to the family Platidiidae; a new genus for "Terebratula" pusilla Philippi (1843).	
Gjelispinifera punctuata	Sp. nov	Valid	Waterhouse	Permian		Canada (Yukon)	A member of Spiriferinida belonging to the superfamily Pennospiriferinoidea and the family Reticulariinidae.	
Gotatrypa vettrensis	Sp. nov	Valid	Baarli	Ordovician/Silurian boundary	Solvik	Norway	A member of the family Atrypidae.	
Gruntoconchinia	Gen. et sp. nov	Valid	Waterhouse	Permian	Foldvik Creek Group	Canada; Greenland	A member of Productida belonging to the superfamily Echinoconchoidea and the family Waagenoconchidae. The type species is G. payerinia.	
Hassanispirifer	Gen. et sp. nov	Valid	Garcia-Alcalde & El Hassani	Devonian (Givetian)	Taboumakhlouf	Morocco	A member of Spiriferida belonging to the family Xenomartiniidae. The type species is H. africanus.	
Himathyris arctica	Sp. nov	Valid	Waterhouse	Permian	Trold Fiord Formation	Canada (Nunavut)	A member of Athyridida belonging to the family Athyrididae.	
Holynetes? mzerrebiensis	Sp. nov	Valid	Garcia-Alcalde & El Hassani	Devonian (Givetian)	Ahrerouch	Morocco	A member of Chonetidina belonging to the family Anopliidae.	
Imbriea	Nom. nov	Valid	Reily	Devonian		United States	A member of Orthotetida belonging to the family Areostrophiidae; a replacement name for Orthopleura Imbrie (1959).	
Kafirnigania jorali	Sp. nov	In press	Berrocal-Casero	Late Cretaceous (Coniacian)		Spain	A member of Terebratulida.	
Kafirnigania massiliensis	Sp. nov	In press	Berrocal-Casero	Late Cretaceous (Coniacian)		France; Spain	A member of Terebratulida.	
Kirkidium canberrense	Sp. nov	Valid	Strusz	Silurian (Wenlock)	Canberra	Australia	A member of Pentamerida belonging to the family Pentameridae.	
Kutorginella minuta	Sp. nov	Valid	Waterhouse	Permian	Assistance Formation	Canada (Nunavut)	A member of Productida belonging to the superfamily Productoidea and the family Retariidae.	
Kuvelousia perpusillus	Sp. nov	Valid	Waterhouse	Permian		Canada (Nunavut; Yukon)	A member of Productida belonging to the family Anidanthidae.	
Lambdarina winklerprinsi	Sp. nov	Valid	Voldman et al.	Carboniferous (Pennsylvanian)	San Emiliano	Spain		
Levitusia elongata	Sp. nov	Valid	Tazawa	Carboniferous (Viséan)		Japan	A member of Productidina belonging to the family Leioproductidae.	
Lingulellotreta yuanshanensis	Sp. nov	Valid	Zhang et al.	Cambrian		China		
Linnaeocaninella	Nom. nov	Valid	Hernández	Middle Permian	Lengwu	China	A replacement name for Caninella Liang (1990)	
Linnarssonia sapushanensis	Sp. nov	Valid	Duan et al.	Cambrian Stage 4	Wulongqing	China	An acrotretoid brachiopod.	
Liosella	Gen. et comb. nov	Valid	Waterhouse	Permian		Canada; Greenland; Norway; United States	A member of Productida belonging to the family Paucispiniferidae. The type species is "Liosotella" grandicosta Dunbar (1955); genus also includes "Productus" spitzbergianus Toula (1874), "Liosotella" vadosisinuata Dunbar (1955) and "Liosotella" delicatula Dunbar (1955).	
Liraria borealis	Sp. nov	Valid	Waterhouse	Permian	Trold Fiord Formation	Canada (Nunavut)	A member of Productida belonging to the family Anidanthidae.	
Lithobolus limbatum	Sp. nov	Valid	Lavié & Benedetto	Ordovician	Suri	Argentina	An obolid brachiopod. Announced in 2019; the final version of the article naming it was published in 2020.	
Magadania attenuata	Sp. nov	Valid	Waterhouse	Permian	Trold Fiord Formation	Canada (Nunavut)	A member of Productida belonging to the superfamily Proboscidelloidea and the family Auriculispinidae.	
Magniplicatina shii	Sp. nov	Valid	Waterhouse	Permian	Jungle Creek Formation	Canada	A member of Productida belonging to the superfamily Proboscidelloidea and the family Paucispinauriidae.	
Martinia stehlii	Sp. nov	Valid	Waterhouse	Permian	Sabine Bay Formation	Canada (Nunavut)	A member of Spiriferida belonging to the family Martiniidae.	
Megousia tortus	Sp. nov	Valid	Waterhouse	Permian		Canada (Yukon)	A member of Productida belonging to the family Anidanthidae.	
Mishninia	Gen. et sp. nov	Valid	Baranov	Early Devonian		Russia	The type species is M. nodosa	
Nahoniella prolata	Sp. nov	Valid	Waterhouse	Permian	Degerböls Formation	Canada (Nunavut)	A member of Spiriferinida belonging to the group Syringothyridina and the family Licharewiidae.	
Neobolus wulongqingensis	Sp. nov	Valid	Zhang, Strotz, Topper & Brock in Zhang et al.	Cambrian Stage 4	Wulongqing	China	A member of Lingulida belonging to the family Neobolidae. Many specimens had tubeworm-like kleptoparasites attached to their shells.	
Neochonetes culcita	Sp. nov	Valid	Waterhouse	Permian		Canada	A member of the family Rugosochonetidae.	
Neochonetes (Sommeriella) longa	Sp. nov	Valid	Wu et al.	Permian (Changhsingian)	Luokeng	China		
Neochonetes (Sommeriella) transversa	Sp. nov	Valid	Wu et al.	Permian (Changhsingian)	Luokeng	China		
Nucleatina anotia	Sp. nov	In press	Berrocal-Casero	Late Cretaceous (Coniacian)		Spain; France?	A member of Terebratulida.	
Nucleatina arcana	Sp. nov	In press	Berrocal-Casero	Late Cretaceous (Coniacian)		Spain	A member of Terebratulida.	
Nucleatina barrosoi	Sp. nov	In press	Berrocal-Casero	Late Cretaceous (Coniacian)		Spain	A member of Terebratulida.	
Orbiculoidea katzeri	Sp. nov	In press	Corrêa & Ramos	Devonian (Lochkovian)	Manacapuru	Brazil		
Orbiculoidea ornata	Sp. nov	Valid	Waterhouse	Permian	Assistance Formation	Canada (Nunavut)	A member of the family Discinidae.	
Orbiculoidea xinguensis	Sp. nov	In press	Corrêa & Ramos	Devonian (Lochkovian)	Manacapuru	Brazil		
Palaeotreta	Gen. et sp. et comb. nov	Valid	Zhang et al.	Cambrian Series 2	Shuijingtuo	China	A member of the family Acrotretidae. The type species is P. shannanensis; genus also includes "Eohadrotreta" zhujiahensis Li & Holmer (2004).	
Paragilledia	Gen. et sp. nov	Valid	Shi, Waterhouse & Lee	Early Permian	Pebbley Beach	Australia	A member of Terebratulida belonging to the family Gillediidae. Genus includes new species P. kioloaensis.	
Paramickwitzia	Gen. et sp. nov	Valid	Pan et al.	Cambrian Series 2	Xinji	China	A stem-brachiopod belonging to the group Mickwitziidae. Genus includes new species P. boreussinaensis. Announced in 2019; the final version of the article naming it was published in 2020.	
Paraspiriferina mcdougallensis	Sp. nov	Valid	Waterhouse	Permian		Canada (Nunavut; Yukon)	A member of Spiriferinida belonging to the superfamily Pennospiriferinoidea and the family Paraspiriferinidae.	
Paraspiriferina stoschensis	Sp. nov	Valid	Waterhouse	Permian		Greenland	A member of Spiriferinida belonging to the superfamily Pennospiriferinoidea and the family Paraspiriferinidae.	
Plectatrypa rindi	Sp. nov	Valid	Baarli	Ordovician/Silurian boundary	Solvik	Norway	A member of the family Atrypinidae.	
Pleurohorridonia platys	Sp. nov	Valid	Waterhouse	Permian	Trold Fiord Formation	Canada (Nunavut)	A member of Productida belonging to the family Horridoniidae.	
Plicarmus	Gen. et sp. nov	Valid	Claybourn et al.	Cambrian Stage 4	Byrd Group	Antarctica	A member of Lingulata. Genus includes new species P. wildi.	
Pomatotrema laubacheri	Sp. nov	Valid	Colmenar & Hodgin	Ordovician	Umachiri	Peru		
Rhinatrypa	Gen. et comb. nov	Valid	Baarli	Ordovician/Silurian boundary	Solvik	Norway	A member of the family Atrypidae. The type species is "Plectatrypa" henningsmoeni Boucot & Johnson (1967).	
Rhipidium oepiki	Sp. nov	Valid	Strusz	Silurian (Wenlock)	Canberra	Australia	A member of Pentamerida belonging to the family Pentameridae.	
Rhipidomella transfigona	Sp. nov	Valid	Waterhouse	Permian		Canada	A member of Orthida belonging to the family Rhipidomellidae.	
Rigrantia laudata	Sp. nov	Valid	Waterhouse	Permian	Takhandit Formation	Canada (Yukon)	A member of Productida belonging to the superfamily Productoidea and the family Retariidae.	
Schrenkiella truncata	Sp. nov	Valid	Waterhouse	Permian		Canada (Nunavut)	A member of Productida belonging to the family Schrenkiellidae.	
Simplicitasia	Gen. et comb. nov	Valid	Waterhouse	Permian	Assistance Formation	Canada (Nunavut; Yukon); Norway	A member of Spiriferida belonging to the family Neospiriferidae. The type species is "Spirifer" osborni Harker (1960).	
Sowerbina longi	Sp. nov	Valid	Waterhouse	Permian	Kapp Starostin Formation	Norway	A member of Productida belonging to the family Horridoniidae.	
Spinocarinifera qilinzhaiensis	Sp. nov	Valid	Nie et al.	Carboniferous (Tournaisian)	Tangbagou Formation	China		
Spiriferella angulata	Sp. nov	Valid	Waterhouse	Permian	Great Bear Cape Formation	Canada; Greenland; Norway	A member of Spiriferida belonging to the family Spiriferellidae.	
Spiriferella oregonia	Sp. nov	Valid	Waterhouse	Permian	Coyote Butte Limestone	United States (Oregon)	A member of Spiriferida belonging to the family Spiriferellidae.	
Spiriferella separata	Sp. nov	Valid	Waterhouse	Permian	Assistance Formation	Canada (Nunavut; Yukon)	A member of Spiriferida belonging to the family Spiriferellidae.	
Spiriferella sulcoconstricta	Sp. nov	Valid	Waterhouse	Permian	Assistance Formation	Canada (Nunavut; Yukon)	A member of Spiriferida belonging to the family Spiriferellidae.	
Spirigerella inflata	Sp. nov	Valid	Waterhouse	Permian	Assistance Formation	Canada (Nunavut)	A member of Athyridida belonging to the family Athyrididae.	
Spirigerella plana	Sp. nov	Valid	Waterhouse	Permian	Assistance Formation	Canada (Nunavut)	A member of Athyridida belonging to the family Athyrididae.	
Stringocephalus sinensis	Sp. nov	Valid	Baranov, Qiao & Blodgett	Devonian (Givetian)		China	A member of the family Stringocephalidae. Announced in 2020; the final version of the article naming was published in 2021.	
Sulcicosta transmarinus	Sp. nov	Valid	Waterhouse	Permian	Assistance Formation	Canada (Nunavut)	A member of Spiriferinida belonging to the family Syringothyrididae.	
Tabellina laseroni	Sp. nov	Valid	Shi, Waterhouse & Lee	Early Permian	Pebbley Beach	Australia	An ingelarelloidean brachiopod belonging to the family Notospiriferidae.	
Tapuritreta gribovensis	Sp. nov	Valid	Holmer et al.	Cambrian (Guzhangian)	Karpinsk Formation	Russia (Arkhangelsk Oblast)	A member of the family Acrotretidae.	
Tcherskidium tenuicostatus	Sp. nov	Valid	Jin & Blodgett	Late Ordovician		United States (Alaska)		
Thamnosia sangminlee	Sp. nov	Valid	Waterhouse	Permian	Great Bear Cape Formation	Canada (Nunavut)	A member of Productida belonging to the superfamily Productoidea and the family Retariidae.	
Thomasaria bultyncki	Sp. nov	Valid	Garcia-Alcalde & El Hassani	Devonian (Givetian)	Ahrerouch	Morocco	A member of Spiriferida belonging to the family Thomasariidae.	
Tintoriella laticostata	Sp. nov	Valid	Waterhouse	Permian		Greenland	A member of Spiriferida belonging to the family Spiriferellidae.	
Undulatina	Gen. et comb. et 2 sp. nov	Valid	Waterhouse	Carboniferous and Permian	Miseryfjellet Formation	Canada; Norway; Russia	A member of Spiriferida belonging to the family Spiriferellidae. The type species is "Spirifer" keilhavii von Buch (1847); genus also includes new species U. verchoyanica and U. kletsi.	
Vagrania naanchanensis	Sp. nov	Valid	Baranov	Early Devonian		Russia	A member of Atrypida.	
Verchojania abramovi	Sp. nov	Valid	Makoshin	Late Carboniferous		Russia	A member of Productida	
Wahwahlingula? pankovensis	Sp. nov	Valid	Holmer et al.	Cambrian (Guzhangian)	Karpinsk Formation	Russia (Arkhangelsk Oblast)	A member of Linguloidea belonging to the family Zhanatellidae.	
Woodwardirhynchia pontemdiaboli	Sp. nov	In press	Berrocal Casero, Barroso Barcenilla & Joral	Late Cretaceous (Coniacian)		Spain	A member of Rhynchonellida	
Yangirostra	Gen. et sp. nov	Valid	Baranov, Qiao & Blodgett	Devonian (Givetian)		China	A member of the family Stringocephalidae. Genus includes new species Y. asiatica. Announced in 2020; the final version of the article naming was published in 2021.	

=== Research ===
- A study on the mode of life of Paleozoic strophomenatans is published by Stanley (2020), who argues that nearly all strophomenatans lived infaunally.
- A study on the paleobiogeography of Early−Middle Devonian (Pragian−Eifelian) brachiopods from West Gondwana, aiming to determine any potential controls that may have driven bioregionalization, is published by Penn-Clarke & Harper (2020).
- A study on the phylogenetic relationships and ecomorphologic diversification of Mesozoic spiriferinids is published by Guo, Chen & Harper (2020).

== Echinoderms ==
=== New taxa ===
Name	Novelty	Status	Authors	Age	Type locality	Country	Notes	Images
Abertella carlsoni	Sp. nov	Valid	Osborn, Portell & Mooi	Miocene		United States (Florida)	A sea urchin.	
Abludoglyptocrinus steinheimerae	Sp. nov	Valid	Cole et al.	Ordovician (Katian)	Brechin Lagerstätte; Bobcaygeon & Verulam	Canada (Ontario)	A monobathrid crinoid.	
Aenigmaticumcrinus	Gen. et sp. nov	Valid	Scheffler	Devonian	Belén	Bolivia	A crinoid belonging to the group Dimerocrinitacea. Genus includes new species A. rochacamposi.	
Aerliceaster	Gen. et sp. nov	Valid	Blake, Gahn & Guensburg	Ordovician (Floian)	Garden City	United States (Idaho)	A starfish. Genus includes new species A. nexosus.	
Alkaidia megaungula	Sp. nov	Valid	Ewin & Gale	Early Cretaceous (Barremian)	Taba	Morocco	A starfish belonging to the family Terminasteridae.	
Arceoaster	Gen. et sp. nov	Valid	Blake & Sprinkle	Silurian	Hunton Group	United States (Oklahoma)	A starfish belonging to the family Hudsonasteridae. Genus includes new species A. hintei.	
Aszulcicrinus	Gen. et sp. nov	Valid	Hagdorn	Middle Triassic (Anisian)	Gogolin	Poland	A crinoid belonging to the group Articulata and the family Dadocrinidae. The type species is A. pentebrachiatus.	
Brissopsis hoffmani	Sp. nov	Valid	Osborn, Portell & Mooi	Miocene		United States (Florida)	A sea urchin.	
Bronthaster	Gen. et sp. nov	In press	Jell & Cook	Carboniferous (Namurian)	Yagon Siltstone	Australia	A brittle star belonging to the family Protasteridae. Genus includes new species B. retus.	
Calclyra bifida	Sp. nov	Valid	Pabst & Herbig	Carboniferous (Serpukhovian)	Genicera	Spain	A brittle star belonging to the group Oegophiurida and the family Calclyridae.	
Clypeaster petersonorum	Sp. nov	Valid	Osborn, Portell & Mooi	Miocene		United States (Florida)	A species of Clypeaster.	
Comptonia bretoni	Sp. nov	Valid	Gale	Early Cretaceous (Aptian)	Atherfield	United Kingdom	A starfish	
Coulonia caseyi	Sp. nov	Valid	Gale	Early Cretaceous (Aptian)	Atherfield	United Kingdom	An astropectinid starfish	
Cyclogrupera	Gen. et sp. nov		Torres-Martínez, Villanueva-Olea & Sour-Tovar	Permian (Asselian‒Sakmarian)	Grupera	Mexico	A crinoid belonging to the family Cyclomischidae. The type species is C. minor.	
Discocrinus africanus	Sp. nov	Valid	Gale	Late Cretaceous (Cenomanian)	Aït Lamine	Morocco	A crinoid belonging to the group Articulata and the family Roveacrinidae.	
Discometra luberonensis	Sp. nov	Valid	Eléaume, Roux & Philippe	Miocene (Burdigalian)		France	A feather star belonging to the family Himerometridae.	
Drepanocrinus wardorum	Sp. nov	Valid	Gale	Late Cretaceous (Cenomanian)		Morocco; Tunisia	A crinoid belonging to the group Articulata and the family Roveacrinidae	
Durhamicystis	Gen. et sp. nov	Valid	Zamora, Sprinkle & Sumrall	Ordovician (Sandbian)	Chambersburg	United States (Maryland)	A member of Eocrinoidea belonging to the family Rhipidocystidae. The type species is D. americana.	
Encrinaster alsbachensis	Sp. nov	Valid	Müller & Hahn	Early Devonian		Germany	A brittle star.	
Enodicalix	Gen. et comb. nov	Valid	Paul & Gutiérrez-Marco	Ordovician		Spain	A member of Diploporita belonging to the family Aristocystitidae. The type species is "Calix" inornatus Meléndez (1958).	
Eoastropecten	Gen. et sp. nov	Valid	Gale	Late Triassic (Carnian)		China	A starfish belonging to the family Astropectinidae. Genus includes new species E. sechuanensis.	
Euglyphocrinus cristagalli	Sp. nov	Valid	Gale	Early Cretaceous (Albian)		Morocco; United States (Texas)	A crinoid belonging to the group Articulata and the family Roveacrinidae	
Euglyphocrinus jacobsae	Sp. nov	Valid	Gale	Late Cretaceous (Cenomanian)		Morocco; Tunisia	A crinoid belonging to the group Articulata and the family Roveacrinidae	
Euglyphocrinus truncatus	Sp. nov	Valid	Gale	Late Cretaceous (Cenomanian)		Morocco; Tunisia	A crinoid belonging to the group Articulata and the family Roveacrinidae	
Euglyphocrinus worthensis	Sp. nov	Valid	Gale	Early Cretaceous (Albian)		Morocco; United States (Texas)	A crinoid belonging to the group Articulata and the family Roveacrinidae	
Euptychocrinus longipinnulus	Sp. nov	Valid	Fearnhead et al.	Silurian (Telychian)	Pysgotwr Grits	United Kingdom	A camerate crinoid	
Eutaxocrinus ariunai	Sp. nov	Valid	Waters et al.	Devonian (Famennian)	Samnuuruul Formation	Mongolia	A crinoid. Announced in 2020; the final version of the article naming was published in 2021.	
Eutaxocrinus sersmaai	Sp. nov	Valid	Waters et al.	Devonian (Famennian)	Samnuuruul Formation	Mongolia	A crinoid. Announced in 2020; the final version of the article naming was published in 2021.	
Fenestracrinus	Gen. et sp. nov	Valid	Gale	Late Cretaceous (Cenomanian)	Aït Lamine	Morocco	A crinoid belonging to the group Articulata and the family Roveacrinidae. The type species is F. oculifer.	
Fernandezaster whisleri	Sp. nov	Valid	Osborn, Portell & Mooi	Pliocene		United States (Florida)	A sea urchin.	
Floricyclocion	Gen. et sp. nov		Torres-Martínez, Villanueva-Olea & Sour-Tovar	Permian (Asselian‒Sakmarian)	Grupera	Mexico	A crinoid belonging to the family Floricyclidae. The type species is F. heteromorpha.	
Gagaria hunterae	Sp. nov	Valid	Osborn, Portell & Mooi	Miocene		United States (Florida)	A sea urchin.	
Genocidaris oyeni	Sp. nov	Valid	Osborn, Portell & Mooi	Pliocene		United States (Florida)	A sea urchin.	
Heterobrissus lubellii	Sp. nov	Valid	Borghi & Stara	Late Oligocene-early Miocene		Italy	A heart urchin.	
Holocrinus qingyanensis	Sp. nov	Valid	Stiller	Middle Triassic (Anisian)		China	A crinoid belonging to the family Holocrinidae. Announced in 2019; the final version of the article naming it was published in 2020.	
Isocrinus (Chladocrinus) covuncoensis	Sp. nov	Valid	Lazo et al.	Early Cretaceous (Valanginian)	Agrio	Argentina	A crinoid.	
Isocrinus (Chladocrinus) pehuenchensis	Sp. nov	Valid	Lazo et al.	Early Cretaceous (Hauterivian)	Agrio	Argentina	A crinoid.	
Kolataster	Gen. et sp. nov	Valid	Blake, Gahn & Guensburg	Ordovician (Sandian)	Mifflin	United States (Illinois)	A starfish. Genus includes new species K. perplexus.	
Lebenharticrinus quinvigintensis	Sp. nov	Valid	Gale	Late Cretaceous (Cenomanian)	Aït Lamine	Morocco	A crinoid belonging to the group Articulata and the family Roveacrinidae	
Lebenharticrinus zitti	Sp. nov	Valid	Gale	Late Cretaceous (Cenomanian)	Aït Lamine	Morocco	A crinoid belonging to the group Articulata and the family Roveacrinidae	
Linguaserra heidii	Sp. nov	Valid	Pabst & Herbig	Carboniferous (Tournaisian to Serpukhovian)	Genicera; Heiligenhaus	Germany; Spain	A member of Ophiocistioidea belonging to the family Linguaserridae.	
Lovenia kerneri	Sp. nov	Valid	Osborn, Portell & Mooi	Pliocene		United States (Florida)	A species of Lovenia.	
Maestratina	Gen. et comb. nov	Valid	Forner i Valls & Saura Vilar	Early Cretaceous (Aptian)	Forcall Formation	Spain	A sea urchin belonging to the group Arbacioida and the family Arbaciidae. The type species is "Cotteaudia" royoi Lambert (1928).	
Magnasterella	Gen. et comb. nov	In press	Fraga & Vega	Devonian (Frasnian)	Ponta Grossa	Brazil	A starfish belonging to the group Euaxosida; a new genus for "Echinasterella" darwini Clarke (1913).	
Marginix notatus	Sp. nov	In press	Fraga & Vega	Devonian (Frasnian)	Ponta Grossa	Brazil	A brittle star	
Meperocrinus	Gen. et sp. nov	Valid	Scheffler	Devonian	Icla	Bolivia	A crinoid belonging to the family Emperocrinidae. Genus includes new species M. angelina.	
Mongoliacrinus	Gen. et sp. nov	Valid	Waters et al.	Devonian (Famennian)	Samnuuruul Formation	Mongolia	A crinoid belonging to the family Acrocrinidae. Genus includes new species M. minjini. Announced in 2020; the final version of the article naming was published in 2021.	
Odontaster tabaensis	Sp. nov	Valid	Ewin & Gale	Early Cretaceous (Barremian)	Taba	Morocco	A starfish, a species of Odontaster.	
Ophiacantha oceani	Sp. nov	Valid	Numberger-Thuy & Thuy	Pliocene to Pleistocene (Piacenzian to Gelasian)		Italy	A brittle star belonging to the family Ophiacanthidae.	
Ophiomitrella floorae	Sp. nov	Valid	Thuy, Numberger-Thuy & Gale	Late Cretaceous (Maastrichtian)	Maastricht	Netherlands	An ophiacanthid brittle star.	
Paragonaster felli	Sp. nov	Valid	Stevens	Early Cretaceous		New Zealand	A starfish.	
Paranaster	Gen. et comb. nov	In press	Fraga & Vega	Devonian (Emsian)	Ponta Grossa	Brazil	A starfish belonging to the group Euaxosida. Genus includes new species P. crucis.	
Pararchaeocrinus kiddi	Sp. nov	Valid	Cole et al.	Ordovician (Katian)	Brechin Lagerstätte; Bobcaygeon & Verulam	Canada (Ontario)	A diplobathrid crinoid.	
Peckicrinus	Gen. et comb. nov	Valid	Gale in Gale et al.	Early Cretaceous (Albian)	Duck Creek	United States (Oklahoma; Texas)	A crinoid belonging to the family Roveacrinidae. The type species is "Poecilocrinus" porcatus Peck (1943). Announced in 2020; the final version of the article naming it was published in 2021.	
Pegoasterella	Gen. et sp. nov	Valid	Blake & Koniecki	Late Ordovician	Bromide; Guttenberg	United States (Illinois; Oklahoma)	A starfish belonging to the family Urasterellidae. Genus includes new species P. pompom.	
Periglyptocrinus astricus	Sp. nov	Valid	Cole et al.	Ordovician (Katian)	Brechin Lagerstätte; Bobcaygeon & Verulam	Canada (Ontario)	A monobathrid crinoid.	
Periglyptocrinus kevinbretti	Sp. nov	Valid	Cole et al.	Ordovician (Katian)	Brechin Lagerstätte; Bobcaygeon & Verulam	Canada (Ontario)	A monobathrid crinoid.	
Periglyptocrinus mcdonaldi	Sp. nov	Valid	Cole et al.	Ordovician (Katian)	Brechin Lagerstätte; Bobcaygeon & Verulam	Canada (Ontario)	A monobathrid crinoid.	
Periglyptocrinus silvosus	Sp. nov	Valid	Cole et al.	Ordovician (Katian)	Brechin Lagerstätte; Bobcaygeon & Verulam	Canada (Ontario)	A monobathrid crinoid.	
Plotocrinus molineuxae	Sp. nov	Valid	Gale in Gale et al.	Early Cretaceous (Albian)	Goodland	United States (Texas)	A crinoid belonging to the family Roveacrinidae. Announced in 2020; the final version of the article naming it was published in 2021.	
Plotocrinus rashallae	Sp. nov	Valid	Gale in Gale et al.	Early Cretaceous (Albian)	Goodland	France; United States (Texas)	A crinoid belonging to the family Roveacrinidae. Announced in 2020; the final version of the article naming it was published in 2021.	
Plotocrinus reidi	Sp. nov	Valid	Gale in Gale et al.	Early Cretaceous (Albian)	Kiamichi	United States (Texas)	A crinoid belonging to the family Roveacrinidae. Announced in 2020; the final version of the article naming it was published in 2021.	
Psammaster	Gen. et comb. nov	Valid	Fau et al.	Late Jurassic (Tithonian)	Grès des Oies	France	A starfish belonging to the group Forcipulatida. The type species is "Ophidiaster" davidsoni de Loriol & Pellat (1874).	
Rhyncholampas meansi	Sp. nov	Valid	Osborn, Portell & Mooi	Pleistocene		United States (Florida)	A sea urchin.	
Roveacrinus gladius	Sp. nov	Valid	Gale	Late Cretaceous (Cenomanian)		Morocco; Tunisia	A crinoid belonging to the group Articulata and the family Roveacrinidae	
Roveacrinus morganae	Sp. nov	Valid	Gale in Gale et al.	Early Cretaceous (Albian)	Pawpaw	United States (Texas)	A crinoid belonging to the family Roveacrinidae. Announced in 2020; the final version of the article naming it was published in 2021.	
Roveacrinus proteus	Sp. nov	Valid	Gale in Gale et al.	Early Cretaceous (Albian)	Pawpaw	United States (Texas)	A crinoid belonging to the family Roveacrinidae. Announced in 2020; the final version of the article naming it was published in 2021.	
Roveacrinus solisoccasum	Sp. nov	Valid	Gale	Early Cretaceous (Albian)		Morocco; United States (Texas)	A crinoid belonging to the group Articulata and the family Roveacrinidae	
Schoenaster carterensis	Sp. nov	Valid	Harris, Ettensohn & Carnahan-Jarvis	Carboniferous (Chesterian)	Slade	United States (Kentucky)	A brittle star	
Seifenia	Gen. et sp. nov	Valid	Müller & Hahn	Early Devonian	Seifen	Germany	A member of Edrioasteroidea. The type species is S. ostara.	
Spiracarneyella	Gen. et sp. nov	Valid	Sumrall & Phelps	Ordovician (Katian)	Point Pleasant	United States (Kentucky; Ohio)	A carneyellid edrioasteroid. Genus includes new species S. florencei.	
Streptoiocrinus	Gen. nov	Valid	Rozhnov	Ordovician		Estonia; Russia (Leningrad Oblast)	A crinoid belonging to the group Disparida.	
Styracocrinus rimafera	Sp. nov	Valid	Gale	Late Cretaceous (Cenomanian)		Morocco; Tunisia	A crinoid belonging to the group Articulata and the family Roveacrinidae	
Styracocrinus thomasae	Sp. nov	Valid	Gale in Gale et al.	Early Cretaceous (Albian)	Goodland	United States (Texas)	A crinoid belonging to the family Roveacrinidae. Announced in 2020; the final version of the article naming it was published in 2021.	
Tallinnicrinus	Gen. et sp. nov	Valid	Cole, Ausich & Wilson	Ordovician (Hirnantian)		Estonia	An anthracocrinid diplobathrid crinoid. Genus includes new species T. toomae.	
Tollmannicrinus leidapoensis	Sp. nov	Valid	Stiller	Middle Triassic (Anisian)		China	A crinoid. Announced in 2019; the final version of the article naming it was published in 2020.	
Tuberocrinus	Gen. et sp. nov	Valid	Scheffler	Devonian	Belén	Bolivia	A crinoid belonging to the group Dimerocrinitacea. Genus includes new species T. lapazensis.	
Vaquerosella perrillatae	Sp. nov	Valid	Martínez Melo & Alvarado Ortega	Miocene	San Ignacio	Mexico	A sand dollar belonging to the family Echinarachniidae	

=== Research ===
- A study on morphological diversification of echinoderms and evolutionary mechanisms underlying the establishment of echinoderm body plans during the early Paleozoic is published by Deline et al. (2020).
- A study on the locomotion of cornute stylophorans, based on data from a specimen of Phyllocystis crassimarginata from the Ordovician (Tremadocian) Saint-Chinian Formation (France), is published by Clark et al. (2020).
- A study on the speciation and dispersal of the diploporan blastozoans through the Ordovician period is published by Lam, Sheffield & Matzke (2020).
- A study on the evolutionary history of eublastoid blastozoans is published by Bauer (2020).
- A study on the anatomy and phylogenetic relationships of Eumorphocystis is published by Guensburg et al. (2020), who consider this taxon to be a blastozoan far removed from crinoids, contrary to the results of the study of Sheffield & Sumrall (2019).
- A study on the phylogeny of the crown group of Echinoidea, based on both phylogenomic and paleontological data, is published by Koch & Thompson (2020).
- A study on the structure of the arms and on probable locomotion strategies of Devonian brittle stars from the Hunsrück Slate (Germany) is published by Clark, Hutchinson & Briggs (2020).

== Conodonts ==
=== New taxa ===
Name	Novelty	Status	Authors	Age	Type locality	Country	Notes	Images
Ancyrognathus minjini	Sp. nov	Valid	Suttner et al.	Late Devonian	Baruunhuurai	Mongolia	Announced in 2019; the final version of the article naming it was published in 2020.	
Baltoniodus norrlandicus denticulatus	Subsp. nov	Valid	Dzik	Ordovician (Darriwilian)		Poland	Announced in 2019; the final version of the article naming it was published in 2020.	
Belodina watsoni	Sp. nov	Valid	Zhen	Ordovician (Darriwilian)		Australia		
Bipennatus hemilevigatus	Sp. nov	Valid	Lu & Königshof	Devonian (Eifelian)	Beiliu	China	Announced in 2019; the final version of the article naming it was published in 2020.	
Bipennatus planus	Sp. nov	Valid	Lu & Königshof	Devonian (Eifelian)	Beiliu	China	Announced in 2019; the final version of the article naming it was published in 2020.	
Diplognathodus benderi	Sp. nov	Valid	Hu et al.	Carboniferous (Bashkirian–Moscovian boundary)		China		
Erraticodon neopatu	Sp. nov	Valid	Zhen in Zhen et al.	Ordovician	Willara	Australia	Announced in 2020; the final version of the article naming it was published in 2021.	
Gladigondolella laii	Sp. nov	In press	Chen in Chen et al.	Early Triassic		Oman		
Idiognathodus fengtingensis	Sp. nov	Valid	Qi et al.	Carboniferous (Kasimovian–Gzhelian boundary)		China		
Idiognathodus luodianensis	Sp. nov	Valid	Qi et al.	Carboniferous (Kasimovian–Gzhelian boundary)		China		
Idiognathodus naqingensis	Sp. nov	Valid	Qi et al.	Carboniferous (Kasimovian–Gzhelian boundary)		China		
Idiognathodus naraoensis	Sp. nov	Valid	Qi et al.	Carboniferous (Kasimovian–Gzhelian boundary)		China		
Latericriodus guangnanensis	Sp. nov	In press	Lu & Valenzuela-Ríos in Lu et al.	Devonian (Emsian)	Daliantang	China	A member of Prioniodontida belonging to the family Icriodontidae.	
Misikella kolarae	Sp. nov	Valid	Karádi et al.	Late Triassic		Hungary	Announced in 2019; the final version of the article naming it was published in 2020.	
Pachycladina rendona	Sp. nov	In press	Wu & Ji in Wu et al.	Early Triassic		China	An ellisonid conodont.	
Palmatolepis subperlobata tatarica	Nom. nov	Valid	Ovnatanova & Gatovsky	Devonian (Famennian)	Prikazanskaya Formation	Russia (Tatarstan)	A replacement name for Palmatolepis subperlobata helmsi Ovnatanova (1976). The subspecies was subsequently raised to the rank of a separate species by Ovnatanova & Kononova (2023).	
Paullella omanensis	Sp. nov	In press	Chen in Chen et al.	Early Triassic		Croatia; Oman		
Polygnathus nalaiensis	Sp. nov	Valid	Lu & Königshof	Devonian (Eifelian)	Beiliu	China	Announced in 2019; the final version of the article naming it was published in 2020.	
Rossodus? boothiaensis	Sp. nov	Valid	Zhang		Turner Cliffs	Canada (Nunavut)		
Scalpellodus percivali	Sp. nov	Valid	Zhen	Ordovician (Darriwilian)		Australia	Subsequently transferred to the genus Kirkupodus.	
Scythogondolella dolosa	Sp. nov	Valid	Bondarenko & Popov	Early Triassic		Russia (Primorsky Krai)		
Siphonodella leiosa	Sp. nov	In press	Souquet, Corradini & Girard	Carboniferous (Tournaisian)		France		
Streptognathodus nemyrovskae	Sp. nov	Valid	Qi et al.	Carboniferous (Gzhelian)		China		
Streptognathodus zhihaoi	Sp. nov	Valid	Qi et al.	Carboniferous (Gzhelian)		China		
Tortodus dodoensis	Sp. nov	Valid	Gouwy, Uyeno & McCracken	Devonian (Givetian)		Canada	Announced in 2019; the final version of the article naming it was published in 2020.	
Trapezognathus pectinatus	Sp. nov	Valid	Dzik	Ordovician (Darriwilian)		Poland	Announced in 2019; the final version of the article naming it was published in 2020.	
Zieglerodina petrea	Sp. nov	Valid	Hušková & Slavík	Silurian/Devonian boundary	Prague Synform	Czech Republic	Announced in 2019; the final version of the article naming it was published in 2020.	

=== Research ===
- Evidence of variations in crystallography and microstructure due to both ontogeny and element type within the conodont feeding apparatus of Dapsilodus obliquicostatus is presented by Shohel et al. (2020), who evaluate the implications of their findings for the knowledge of the integrity of conodont apatite as a recorder of seawater chemistry.
- A study aiming to determine whether the repeated emergence of similar morphologies in the dental elements of Permian conodonts belonging to the genus Sweetognathus is an example of parallel evolution is published by Petryshen et al. (2020).

== Synapsids ==
=== Non-mammalian synapsids ===
==== New taxa ====
Name	Novelty	Status	Authors	Age	Type locality	Country	Notes	Images
Agudotherium	Gen. et sp. nov	Valid	Stefanello et al.	Late Triassic	Candelária	Brazil	A non-mammaliaform prozostrodontian cynodont. Genus includes new species A. gassenae.	
Bohemiclavulus	Gen. et comb. nov	Valid	Spindler, Voigt & Fischer	Carboniferous (Gzhelian)	Slaný	Czech Republic	A member of the family Edaphosauridae; a new genus for "Naosaurus" mirabilis Fritsch (1895). Announced in 2019; the final version of the article naming it was published in 2020.	
Caodeyao	Gen. et sp. nov	Valid	Liu & Abdala	Late Permian	Naobaogou	China	A therocephalian. Genus includes new species C. liuyufengi.	
Chiniquodon omaruruensis	Sp. nov	Valid	Mocke, Gaetano & Abdala	Triassic	Omingonde	Namibia		
Dendromaia	Gen. et sp. nov	Valid	Maddin, Mann & Hebert	Carboniferous		Canada (Nova Scotia)	A member of Varanopidae. Genus includes new species D. unamakiensis. Announced in 2019; the final version of the article naming it was published in 2020.	
Etjoia	Gen. et sp. nov	Valid	Hendrickx et al.	Triassic (Ladinian/Carnian)	Omingonde	Namibia	A traversodontid cynodont. Genus includes new species E. dentitransitus.	
Hypselohaptodus	Gen. et comb. nov	Valid	Spindler	Permian (Cisuralian)	Kenilworth	United Kingdom	An early member of Sphenacodontia; a new genus for "Haptodus" grandis. Announced in 2019; the final version of the article naming it was published in 2020.	
Inditherium	Gen. et sp. nov	Valid	Bhat, Ray & Datta	Late Triassic	Tiki	India	A dromatheriid cynodont. Genus includes new species I. floris.	
Kalaallitkigun	Gen. et sp. nov	Valid	Sulej et al.	Late Triassic (Norian)	Fleming Fjord	Greenland	An early member of Mammaliaformes, possibly a member of Haramiyida. Genus includes new species K. jenkinsi.	
Kataigidodon	Gen. et sp. nov	Valid	Kligman et al.	Late Triassic	Chinle	United States (Arizona)	A non-mammalian eucynodont. Genus includes new species K. venetus.	
Kenomagnathus	Gen. et sp. nov	Valid	Spindler	Carboniferous (late Pennsylvanian)	Rock Lake Shale Mb, Stanton	United States (Kansas)	An early member of Sphenacodontia. The type species is K. scottae.	
Martensius	Gen. et sp. nov	Valid	Berman et al.	Permian (Artinskian)	Tambach	Germany	A member of Caseidae. The type species is M. bromackerensis.	
Nshimbodon	Gen. et sp. nov	Valid	Huttenlocker & Sidor	Late Permian	Madumabisa Mudstone	Zambia	A basal cynodont, probably a member of the family Charassognathidae. Genus includes new species N. muchingaensis.	
Polonodon	Gen. et sp. nov	Valid	Sulej et al.	Late Triassic (Carnian)		Poland	A non-mammaliaform eucynodont. Genus includes new species P. woznikiensis. Announced in 2018; the final version of the article naming it was published in 2020.	
Remigiomontanus	Gen. et sp. nov	Valid	Spindler, Voigt & Fischer	Carboniferous–Permian transition	Saar–Nahe	Germany	A member of the family Edaphosauridae. Genus includes new species R. robustus. Announced in 2019; the final version of the article naming it was published in 2020.	
Rewaconodon indicus	Sp. nov	Valid	Bhat, Ray & Datta	Late Triassic	Tiki	India	A dromatheriid cynodont.	
Taoheodon	Gen. et sp. nov	Valid	Liu	Late Permian	Sunjiagou Formation	China	A dicynodontoid dicynodont. Genus includes new species T. baizhijuni.	
Theroteinus jenkinsi	Sp. nov	Valid	Whiteside & Duffin	Late Triassic (Rhaetian)		United Kingdom	A haramiyidan mammaliaform. Announced in 2020; the final version of the article naming it was published in 2021.	
Tikiodon	Gen. et sp. nov	Valid	Bhat, Ray & Datta	Late Triassic	Tiki	India	A mammaliamorph cynodont. Genus includes new species T. cromptoni.	

==== Research ====
- A study on the evolution of the well-defined morphological regions of the vertebral column and of vertebral functional diversity in synapsids is published by Jones et al. (2020).
- A study aiming to determine the resting metabolic rates and the thermometabolic regimes (endothermy or ectothermy) in eight non-mammalian synapsids is published by Faure-Brac & Cubo (2020).
- A study on the shoulder musculature in extant Argentine black and white tegu and Virginia opossum, evaluating its implications for reconstructions of the shoulder musculature in non-mammalian synapsids, is published by Fahn-Lai, Biewener & Pierce (2020).
- A study aiming to determine whether a vicariance pattern can explain early synapsid evolution is published by Brikiatis (2020).
- Mann et al. (2020) reinterpret Carboniferous taxon Asaphestera platyris Steen (1934) from the Joggins locality (Nova Scotia, Canada) as the earliest unambiguous synapsid in the fossil record reported so far.
- A study on the long bone histology of varanopids from the lower Permian Richards Spur locality (Oklahoma, United States), evaluating its implications for the knowledge of the paleobiology of early synapsids, is published by Huttenlocker & Shelton (2020).
- Mann & Reisz (2020) report a new hyper-elongated neural spine of Echinerpeton intermedium from the Pennsylvanian-aged Sydney Mines Formation (Nova Scotia, Canada), indicating a wider distribution of hyper-elongation of vertebral neural spines in early synapsids than previously known.
- A study on the histology of vertebral centra of Edaphosaurus and Dimetrodon is published by Agliano, Sander & Wintrich (2020).
- A study on the anatomy of the holotype skull of Tetraceratops insignis and on the phylogenetic relationships of this taxon is published by Spindler (2020).
- A study comparing the oxygen and carbon stable isotope compositions of tooth and bone apatite of Endothiodon and Tropidostoma, and aiming to determine the ecology and diet of Endothiodon, is published by Rey et al. (2020).
- Whitney & Sidor (2020) compare the frequency and patterns of growth marks in tusks of Lystrosaurus from polar Antarctica and from the non-polar Karoo Basin of South Africa living ~250 Mya, and report evidence of prolonged stress interpreted as indicative of torpor in polar specimens. This could be the oldest evidence of a hibernation-like state in a vertebrate animal and indicates that torpor arose in vertebrates before mammals and dinosaurs evolved.
- A study on the skull length and growth patterns of the four South African Lystrosaurus species (L. maccaigi, L. curvatus, L. murrayi and L. declivis), aiming to determine whether the end-Permian mass extinction caused the Lilliput effect in Lystrosaurus species from the Karoo Basin and to infer their lifestyle, is published by Botha (2020).
- A study aiming to examine the basis for claims that the genus Lystrosaurus is a disaster taxon is published by Modesto (2020).
- A study on tooth serrations in a Permian gorgonopsian from Zambia, identifying the occurrence of denticles and interdental folds forming the cutting edges in the teeth which were previously thought to be unique to theropod dinosaurs and some other archosaurs, is published by Whitney et al. (2020).
- Redescription of the skull of Lycosuchus vanderrieti, providing new information on the endocranial anatomy of this taxon, is published by Pusch et al. (2020).
- A review of the fossil record of Triassic non-mammaliaform cynodonts from western Gondwana and its importance for the knowledge of the origin of mammals, focusing on taxa known from Argentina, is published by Abdala et al. (2020).
- A study on the tooth replacement in Galesaurus planiceps is published by Norton et al. (2020).
- The third specimen of Prozostrodon brasiliensis, providing novel information on the anatomy of this taxon, is described by Kerber et al. (2020).

== Other animals ==
=== New taxa ===
Name	Novelty	Status	Authors	Age	Type locality	Country	Notes	Images
Aladraco kirchhainensis	Sp. nov	Valid	Geyer & Malinky	Cambrian (Miaolingian)	Delitzsch–Torgau–Doberlug	Germany	A member of Hyolitha. Announced in 2019; the final version of the article naming it was published in 2020.	
Armilimax	Gen. et sp. nov	Valid	Kimmig & Selden	Cambrian (Wuliuan)	Spence Shale	United States (Utah)	A shell-bearing animal of uncertain phylogenetic placement. Genus includes new species A. pauljamisoni. Announced in 2020; the final version of the article naming it was published in 2021.	
Avitograptus akidomorphus	Sp. nov	Valid	Muir et al.	Ordovician (Hirnantian)	Wenchang	China	A graptolite.	
Bizeticyathus	Gen. et comb. nov	Valid	Kruse & Debrenne	Cambrian		Australia	A member of Archaeocyatha. Genus includes B. carmen (Carmen & Carmen, 1937).	
Canadiella	Gen. et comb. nov	Valid	Skovsted et al.	Cambrian	Mural; Rosella	Canada	A tommotiid belonging to the family Kennardiidae. The type species is "Lapworthella" filigrana Conway Morris & Fritz (1984).	
Collinsovermis	Gen. et sp. nov	Valid	Caron & Aria	Cambrian (Wuliuan)	Burgess Shale	Canada (British Columbia)	A luolishaniid lobopodian. Genus includes new species C. monstruosus.	
Cordaticaris	Gen. et sp. nov	In press	Sun, Zeng & Zhao	Cambrian (Drumian)	Zhangxia	China	A member of Radiodonta belonging to the family Hurdiidae. Genus includes new species C. striatus.	
Cornulites baranovi	Sp. nov	Valid	Vinn & Toom	Silurian (Přidoli)	Ohesaare	Estonia	A member of Cornulitida.	
Dahescolex	Gen. et sp. nov	Valid	Shao et al.	Cambrian (Fortunian)	Kuanchuanpu	China	An animal which might be a stem-lineage derivative of Scalidophora. Genus includes new species D. kuanchuanpuensis. Announced in 2019; the final version of the article naming it was published in 2020.	
Dakorhachis	Gen. et sp. nov	Valid	Conway Morris et al.	Cambrian (Guzhangian)	Weeks	United States (Utah)	An animal of uncertain phylogenetic placement, possibly a stem-group member of the Gnathifera. Genus includes new species D. thambus.	
Dannychaeta	Gen. et sp. nov	Valid	Chen et al.	Early Cambrian	Canglangpu	China	A crown annelid, probably a relative of the families Magelonidae and Oweniidae. Genus includes new species D. tucolus.	
Degeletticyathus dailyi	Sp. nov	Valid	Kruse & Debrenne	Cambrian		Australia	A member of Archaeocyatha.	
"Dictyonema" khadijae	Sp. nov	In press	Gutiérrez Marco, Muir & Mitchell	Late Ordovician		Morocco	A graptolite	
"Dictyonema" villasi	Sp. nov	In press	Gutiérrez Marco, Muir & Mitchell	Late Ordovician		Morocco	A graptolite	
Gyaltsenglossus	Gen. et sp. nov	Valid	Nanglu, Caron & Cameron	Cambrian	Stephen	Canada (British Columbia)	A member of the stem group of Hemichordata. The type species is G. senis.	
Herpetogaster haiyanensis	Sp. nov		Yang et al.	Cambrian Stage 3	Chiungchussu	China		
Hillaecyathus	Gen. et comb. nov	Valid	Kruse & Debrenne	Cambrian		Australia	A member of Archaeocyatha. Genus includes H. contractus (Hill, 1965).	
Ikaria	Gen. et sp. nov	Valid	Evans et al.	Ediacaran		Australia	An early bilaterian. Genus includes new species I. wariootia.	
Korenograptus selectus	Sp. nov	In press	Chen in Chen et al.	Late Ordovician		Myanmar	A graptolite	
Kylinxia	Gen. et sp. nov	Valid	Zeng, Zhao & Huang in Zeng et al.	Early Cambrian		China	A transitional euarthropod that bridges radiodonts and true arthropods. Genus includes new species K. zhangi.	
Lenzograptus	Nom. nov	In press	Loydell	Silurian (Ludlow)		Canada (Yukon)	A graptolite; a replacement name for Lenzia Rickards & Wright (1999).	
Longxiantheca	Gen. et sp. nov	Valid	Li in Li et al.	Cambrian Stages 3–4	Xinji	China	A member of Hyolitha belonging to the group Orthothecida. The type species is L. mira.	
Maxdebrennius	Gen. et sp. nov	Valid	Kruse & Debrenne	Cambrian		Australia	A member of Archaeocyatha. Genus includes new species M. mimus.	
Microconchus cravenensis	Sp. nov	Valid	Zatoń & Mundy	Carboniferous (Mississippian)	Cracoe Limestone; Malham	United Kingdom	A member of Microconchida.	
Microconchus maya	Sp. nov	Valid	Heredia-Jiménez et al.	Permian (Roadian)	Paso Hondo	Mexico	A member of Microconchida.	
Monograptus hamulus	Sp. nov	Valid	Saparin et al.	Silurian (Llandovery)	Co To	Vietnam	A graptolite	
Neodiplograptus mandalayensis	Sp. nov	In press	Chen in Chen et al.	Late Ordovician		Myanmar	A graptolite	
Nochoroicyathus ordinarius	Sp. nov	Valid	Kruse & Debrenne	Cambrian		Australia	A member of Archaeocyatha.	
Nochoroicyathus sublimus	Sp. nov	Valid	Kruse & Debrenne	Cambrian		Australia	A member of Archaeocyatha.	
Paranacyathus arboreus	Sp. nov	Valid	Kruse & Debrenne	Cambrian		Australia	A member of Archaeocyatha.	
Pontagrossia	Gen. et sp. nov	Valid	Chahud & Fairchild	Devonian (Emsian)	Ponta Grossa	Brazil	An invertebrate of uncertain phylogenetic placement. The type species is P. reticulata.	
Porocoscinus eurys	Sp. nov	Valid	Kruse & Debrenne	Cambrian		Australia	A member of Archaeocyatha.	
Pristiograptus paradoxus	Sp. nov	In press	Loydell & Walasek	Silurian (Telychian)		Sweden	A graptolite	
Stictocyathus	Gen. et sp. nov	Valid	Kruse & Debrenne	Cambrian		Australia	A member of Archaeocyatha. Genus includes new species S. cavus.	
Subtumulocyathellus satus	Sp. nov	Valid	Kruse & Debrenne	Cambrian		Australia	A member of Archaeocyatha.	
Torquigraptus loveridgei	Sp. nov	In press	Loydell & Walasek	Silurian (Telychian)		Sweden	A graptolite	
Torquigraptus wilsoni	Sp. nov	Valid	Loydell	Silurian (Telychian)		United Kingdom	A graptolite	
Toscanisoma	Gen. et 2 sp. nov	Valid	Wendt	Late Triassic (Carnian)	San Cassiano	Italy	A member of Ascidiacea. The type species is T. multipartitum; genus also includes T. triplicatum.	
Utahscolex	Gen. et comb. nov	Valid	Whitaker et al.	Cambrian (Wuliuan)	Spence	United States (Utah)	A palaeoscolecid; a new genus for "Palaeoscolex" ratcliffei Robison (1969)	
Vermilituus	Gen. et sp. nov	Valid	Li et al.	Cambrian Stage 3	Chiungchussu	China	A small, encrusting tubular protostomian, preserved attached to a mobile host (Vetulicola). The type species is V. gregarius.	
Wronacyathus	Gen. et sp. nov	Valid	Kruse & Debrenne	Cambrian		Australia	A member of Archaeocyatha. Genus includes new species W. ayuzhui.	
Zhongpingscolex	Gen. et sp. nov	Valid	Shao et al.	Cambrian (Fortunian)	Kuanchuanpu	China	A scalidophoran, probably a stem-group kinorhynch. Genus includes new species Z. qinensis.	
Zuunia	Gen. et sp. nov		Yang et al.	Late Ediacaran	Zuun-Arts	Mongolia	A cloudinid. The type species is Z. chimidtsereni.	

=== Research ===
- A study on the taphonomy of three-dimensionally preserved specimens of Charnia from the White Sea, and on their implications for the knowledge of rangeomorph feeding and physiology, is published by Butterfield (2020).
- A study on the morphology and likely mode of life of Beothukis mistakensis is published by McIlroy et al. (2020).
- Evidence of preservation of internal anatomical structures in cloudinomorph fossils from the Ediacaran Wood Canyon Formation (Nevada, United States) is reported by Schiffbauer et al. (2020), who interpret these structures as probable digestive tracts, and evaluate their implications for the knowledge of the phylogenetic relationships of cloudinomorphs.
- Fossils of Dickinsonia identical with D. tenuis from the Ediacara Member of the Rawnsley Quartzite in South Australia are reported from the late Ediacaran Maihar Sandstone of the Bhander Group (India; found in the roof of Auditorium Cave at Bhimbetka rock shelters) by Retallack et al. (2020), who interpret this finding as confirming the assembly of Gondwana by 550 Ma; however, Meert et al. (2023) subsequently reinterpreted purported fossil material of Dickinsonia as an impression resulting from decay of a modern beehive.
- New specimens of Mafangscolex, providing the first detailed information on the anatomy of a proboscis in palaeoscolecids, are described from the Cambrian Xiaoshiba Lagerstätte (Kunming, China) by Yang et al. (2020).
- A study on the type material of a putative Ordovician annelid Haileyia adhaerens is published by Muir & Botting (2020) who find no evidence indicating that H. adhaerens is an annelid, or even a recognizable fossil.
- New hyolithid specimens preserving helens and interior soft tissues, including muscle scars and digestive tracts, are described from the Guanshan Biota (Cambrian Stage 4; Yunnan, China) by Liu et al. (2020).
- Redescription of Acosmia maotiania based on data from new and historic fossil material is published by Howard et al. (2020), who interpret this animal as a stem group ecdysozoan.
- Two types of microscopic reticulate cuticular patterns are described in Cambrian stem-group scalidophorans from the Kuanchuanpu Formation (China) by Wang et al. (2020), who argue that these cuticular networks replicate the cell boundaries of the epidermis.
- A study on the anatomy and phylogenetic relationships of Facivermis yunnanicus, based on data from the holotype and new specimens, is published by Howard et al. (2020), who consider this species to be a luolishaniid lobopodian.
- New type of a compound eye is identified in specimens of "Anomalocaris" briggsi from the Cambrian Emu Bay Shale (Australia) by Paterson, Edgecombe & García-Bellido (2020), who interpret the eye morphology of "A." briggsi as suggestive of this animal being a mesopelagic species, capable of inhabiting depths of several hundred meters, and likely using its acute, light-sensitive eyes to detect plankton in dim down-welling light.
- An isolated frontal appendage of a miniature hurdiid radiodont (less than half the size of the next smallest radiodont frontal appendage discovered so far) is described from the Ordovician (Tremadocian) Dol-cyn-Afon Formation (Wales, United Kingdom) by Pates et al. (2020), representing the first radiodont reported from the UK, the first record of this group from the palaeocontinent Avalonia, and the first from an environment dominated by sponges rather than euarthropods.
- Barrios-de Pedro, Osuna & Buscalioni (2020) report the discovery of trematode and nematode eggs in coprolites from the Barremian Las Hoyas fossil site (Spain).

== Foraminifera ==
Name	Novelty	Status	Authors	Age	Type locality	Country	Notes	Images
Carseyella	Gen. et sp. nov	Valid	Schlagintweit	Early Cretaceous (Aptian and Albian)		Algeria; Mexico; United States; Venezuela	A new genus for "Orbitolina" walnutensis Carsey (1926) and "Dictyoconus" algerianus Cherchi & Schroeder (1982). Announced in 2020; the final version of the article naming it was published in 2021.	

== Other organisms ==
=== New taxa ===
Name	Novelty	Status	Authors	Age	Type locality	Country	Notes	Images
Annularidens	Gen. et sp. nov	In press	Ouyang et al.	Ediacaran	Doushantuo	China	An acritarch. Genus includes new species A. inconditus.	
Anqiutrichoides	Gen. et sp. nov	Valid	Li et al.	Tonian	Shiwangzhuang	China	A multicellular organism of uncertain phylogenetic placement, possibly a eukaryotic alga. Genus includes new species A. constrictus.	
Aphralysia anfracta	Sp. nov	Valid	Kopaska-Merkel, Haywick & Keyes	Carboniferous (Serpukhovian)		United States (Alabama)	A tubular calcitic microfossil of uncertain affinities	
Arborea denticulata	Sp. nov	Valid	Wang et al.	Ediacaran	Dengying	China	A frondose fossil of uncertain affinities.	
Archaeosporites	Gen. et sp. nov	Valid	Harper et al.	Early Devonian	Rhynie chert	United Kingdom	A fungus belonging to the group Archaeosporaceae. Genus includes new species A. rhyniensis.	
Asteridium tubulus	Sp. nov	Valid	Yin et al.	Cambrian Stage 4		China	An organic-walled microfossil. Announced in 2020; the final version of the article naming it was published in 2021.	
Attenborites	Gen. et sp. nov	Valid	Droser et al.	Ediacaran	Rawnsley	Australia	An organism of uncertain phylogenetic placement, described on the basis of a well-defined irregular oval to circular fossil. Genus includes new species A. janeae. Announced in 2018; the final version of the article naming it was published in 2020.	
Bispinosphaera vacua	Sp. nov	In press	Ouyang et al.	Ediacaran	Doushantuo	China	An acritarch.	
Brijax	Gen. et sp. nov	In press	Krings & Harper	Devonian	Rhynie chert	United Kingdom	A probable chytrid fungus. Genus includes new species B. amictus.	
Convolutubus	Gen. et sp. nov	Valid	Vaziri et al.	Ediacaran		Iran	An organic-walled tubular organism. Genus includes new species C. dargazinensis.	
Corrugasphaera perfecta	Sp. nov	Valid	Yin et al.	Cambrian Stage 4		China	An organic-walled microfossil. Announced in 2020; the final version of the article naming it was published in 2021.	
Crassimembrana	Gen. et 2 sp. nov	In press	Ouyang et al.	Ediacaran	Doushantuo	China	An acritarch. Genus includes new species C. crispans and C. multitunica.	
Cyanosarcinopsis	Gen. et sp. nov	Valid	Calça & Fairchild	Permian	Assistência	Brazil	A chroococcacean. Genus includes new species C. hachiroi.	
Cyathochitina brussai	Sp. nov	In press	De la Puente, Paris & Vaccari	Ordovician (Hirnantian) and Silurian (Rhuddanian)	Brutia; Clemville; Salar del Rincón; Soom Shale	Argentina; Belgium; Canada; Chad; Mauritania; South Africa; Iran? Jordan? Libya?	A chitinozoan.	
Cyathochitina lariensis	Sp. nov	In press	De la Puente, Paris & Vaccari	Latest Ordovician–earliest Silurian	Salar del Rincón	Argentina	A chitinozoan.	
Cyathochitina punaensis	Sp. nov	In press	De la Puente, Paris & Vaccari	Latest Ordovician–earliest Silurian	Salar del Rincón	Argentina	A chitinozoan.	
Cymatiosphaera spina	Sp. nov	Valid	Yin et al.	Cambrian Stage 4		China	An organic-walled microfossil. Announced in 2020; the final version of the article naming it was published in 2021.	
Dichothallus	Gen. et sp. nov	In press	Naugolnykh	Permian (early Kungurian)	Philippovian	Russia	A brown alga of uncertain phylogenetic placement. Genus includes new species D. divaricatus.	
Dictyocyrillium	Gen. et sp. nov	In press	Martí Mus, Moczydłowska & Knoll	Tonian	Elbobreen	Norway	A vase-shaped microfossil. Genus includes new species D. erythron.	
Distosphaera jinguadunensis	Sp. nov	In press	Ouyang et al.	Ediacaran	Doushantuo	China	An acritarch.	
Dongyesphaera	Gen. et sp. nov	In press	Yin et al.	Paleoproterozoic	Tianpengnao	China	An acritarch. Genus includes new species D. tenuispina.	
Eoentophysalis hutuoensis	Sp. nov	In press	Yin et al.	Paleoproterozoic	Hebiancun	China	A cyanobacterium belonging to the family Entophysalidaceae	
Eosolena magna	Sp. nov	Valid	Li et al.	Tonian	Shiwangzhuang	China	A multicellular, eukaryotic alga.	
Flabellophyton obesum	Sp. nov	Valid	Wan et al.	Ediacaran		China	An organism of uncertain phylogenetic placement, possibly an alga.	
Flabellophyton stupendum	Sp. nov	In press	Xiao et al.	Ediacaran	Rawnsley Quartzite	Australia	Probably a benthic macroalga.	
Flabellophyton typicum	Sp. nov	Valid	Wan et al.	Ediacaran		China	An organism of uncertain phylogenetic placement, possibly an alga.	
Liulingjitaenia irregularis	Sp. nov	In press	Xiao et al.	Ediacaran	Rawnsley Quartzite	Australia	Probably a benthic macroalga.	
Mengeosphaera matryoshkaformis	Sp. nov	In press	Ouyang et al.	Ediacaran	Doushantuo	China	An acritarch.	
Nepia	Gen. et sp. nov	Valid	Golubkova in Golubkova & Kochnev	Ediacaran		Russia	An oscillatorian cyanobacteria. Genus includes new species N. calicina.	
Noffkarkys	Gen. et sp. nov	Valid	Retallack & Broz	Ediacaran and Cambrian	Arumbera; Flathead; Grant Bluff; Jodhpur; Synalds	Australia; India; United Kingdom; United States (Montana)	An organism of uncertain phylogenetic placement, a member of the family Charniidae. Genus includes new species N. storaaslii. Announced in 2020; the final version of the article naming it was published in 2021.	
Obamus	Gen. et sp. nov	Valid	Dzaugis et al.	Ediacaran	Rawnsley	Australia	A torus-shaped organism, similar in gross morphology to some poriferans and benthic cnidarians. Genus includes new species O. coronatus. Announced in 2018; the final version of the article naming it was published in 2020.	
Ophiocordyceps dominicanus	Sp. nov	Valid	Poinar & Vega	Eocene or Miocene	Dominican amber	Dominican Republic	A fungus, a species of Ophiocordyceps. Announced in 2019; the final version of the article naming it was published in 2020.	
Palaeomycus	Gen. et sp. nov	Valid	Poinar	Late Cretaceous (Cenomanian)	Burmese amber	Myanmar	A fungus described on the basis of pycnidia. Genus includes new species P. epallelus. Announced in 2018; the final version of the article naming it was published in 2020.	
Pararenicola gejiazhuangensis	Sp. nov	Valid	Li et al.	Tonian	Shiwangzhuang	China	A coenocytic alga.	
Patagonifilum	Gen. et sp. nov	In press	Massini et al.	Late Jurassic	La Matilde	Argentina	A cyanobacterium. Genus includes new species P. jurassicum.	
Plagasphaera	Gen. et sp. nov	Valid	Yin et al.	Cambrian Stage 4		China	An organic-walled microfossil. Genus includes new species P. balangensis. Announced in 2020; the final version of the article naming it was published in 2021.	
Polycephalomyces baltica	Sp. nov	Valid	Poinar & Vega	Eocene	Baltic amber	Russia (Kaliningrad Oblast)	A fungus belonging to the family Ophiocordycipitaceae. Announced in 2019; the final version of the article naming it was published in 2020.	
Proaulopora ordosia	Sp. nov	In press	Liu et al.	Ordovician	Ordos Basin	China	A member of Nostocales.	
Protoarenicola baishicunensis	Sp. nov	Valid	Li et al.	Tonian	Shiwangzhuang	China	A coenocytic alga.	
Protoarenicola shijiacunensis	Sp. nov	Valid	Li et al.	Tonian	Shiwangzhuang	China	A coenocytic alga.	
Protographum	Gen. et sp. nov	Valid	Le Renard et al.	Early Cretaceous	Potomac	United States (Virginia)	A fungus belonging or related to the family Aulographaceae. Genus includes new species P. luttrellii.	
Pterospermella vinctusa	Sp. nov	Valid	Yin et al.	Cambrian Stage 4		China	An organic-walled microfossil. Announced in 2020; the final version of the article naming it was published in 2021.	
Ramochitina deynouxi	Sp. nov	In press	De la Puente, Paris & Vaccari	Latest Ordovician–earliest Silurian	Salar del Rincón	Argentina; Mauritania	A chitinozoan.	
Sinosabellidites huangshanensis	Sp. nov	Valid	Li et al.	Tonian	Shiwangzhuang	China	A coenocytic alga.	
Spinachitina titae	Sp. nov	In press	De la Puente, Paris & Vaccari	Latest Ordovician–earliest Silurian	Salar del Rincón	Argentina	A chitinozoan.	
Spiroplasma burmanica	Gen. et sp. nov	Valid	Poinar	Cretaceous (Albian-Cenomanian)	Burmese amber	Myanmar	A bacterium belonging to the group Mollicutes, a species of Spiroplasma.	
Stomiopeltites shangcunicus	Sp. nov	Valid	Maslova & Tobias in Maslova et al.	Oligocene	Shangcun	China	A fungus belonging to the family Micropeltidaceae. Announced in 2020; the final version of the article naming it was published in 2021.	
Triskelia	Gen. et sp. nov	Valid	Strullu-Derrien et al.	Devonian	Rhynie Chert	United Kingdom	An organism of uncertain phylogenetic placement, possibly a green alga or a fungus. Genus includes new species T. scotlandica. Announced in 2020; the final version of the article naming it was published in 2021.	
Windipila wimmervoecksii	Sp. nov	Valid	Krings & Harper	Early Devonian	Windyfield	United Kingdom	A fungal reproductive unit. Announced in 2019; the final version of the article naming it was published in 2020.	

=== Research ===
- A study on fossilized biopolymers in 3.5–3.3 Ga microbial mats from the Barberton Greenstone Belt (South Africa) is published by Hickman-Lewis, Westall & Cavalazzi (2020), who interpret their findings as indicating that Bacteria and Archaea flourished together in Earth's earliest ecosystems.
- Putative ciliate fossils from the Cryogenian Taishir Formation (Tsagaan Olom Group, Zavkhan Terrane, Mongolia) are reinterpreted as more likely to be algal reproductive structures by Cohen, Vizcaíno & Anderson (2020), who also report the first occurrence of these fossils in the earliest Ediacaran Ol Formation.
- The discovery of fungal fossils in an 810 to 715 million year old dolomitic shale from the Mbuji-Mayi Supergroup (Democratic Republic of the Congo) is reported by Bonneville et al. (2020), representing the oldest, molecularly identified remains of Fungi reported so far.
- Specimens of Palaeopascichnus linearis living before the Gaskiers glaciation are described from marine strata within the Rocky Harbour Formation by Liu & Tindal (2020), representing the oldest documented macrofossils from the Ediacaran successions of Newfoundland reported so far.
- A study on the developmental biology and phylogenetic relationships of Helicoforamina wenganica is published by Yin et al. (2020).
- A study on the morphology and affinities of a putative early sponge Namapoikia rietoogensis is published by Mehra et al. (2020), who argue that Namapoikia lacked the physical characteristics expected of an animal.
- A study on the morphology and inner ultrastructure of exceptionally preserved chitinozoan specimens from the Ordovician of Estonia, the United States and Russia is published by Liang et al. (2020), who interpret their findings as evidence of a protist affinity of chitinozoans.

== Trace fossils ==
- A study on patterns of ecosystem engineering behaviors across the Permian-Triassic boundary, as indicated by data from trace fossils, and on their possible impact on ecosystem recovery in the benthic environment in the aftermath of the Permian–Triassic extinction event is published by Cribb & Bottjer (2020).
- New fossil tracks, probably produced by a pterygote insect, are described from the Upper Jurassic-Lower Cretaceous Botucatu Formation (Brazil) by Peixoto et al. (2020), who name a new ichnotaxon Paleohelcura araraquarensis, and evaluate the implications of this finding for the knowledge of ecological relationships within the Botucatu paleodesert.
- A new assemblage of nests produced by social insects is described from the Brushy Basin Member of the Upper Jurassic Morrison Formation (Utah, United States) by Smith, Loewen & Kirkland (2020), who name a new ichnotaxon Eopolis ekdalei.
- New tetrapod trackways are described from the Tapinocephalus Assemblage Zone of the South African Karoo Basin by Cisneros et al. (2020), who interpret these tracks as produced by small amphibians, and consider them to be evidence that the diversity of Guadalupian amphibians of the Karoo Basin was greater than indicated by body fossils alone.
- Mujal & Schoch (2020) describe amphibian tracks from the Middle Triassic Erfurt Formation (Germany, probably produced by capitosaurid temnospondyls, and evaluate the implications of this finding for the knowledge of the locomotion and habitats of temnospondyls.
- Fossil tracks likely produced by early amniotes are described from the Carboniferous (Pennsylvanian) Manakacha Formation (Arizona, United States) by Rowland, Caputo & Jensen (2020), who interpret these tracks as evidence of early adaptation of amniotes to eolian dunefield deserts, as well as the first documented occurrence of a lateral-sequence gait in the pre-Miocene tetrapod fossil record.
- Revision of Pachypes-like footprints from the Cisuralian–Guadalupian of Europe and North America is published by Marchetti et al. (2020), who date the earliest known occurrence of Pachypes to the Artinskian, interpret the footprints belonging to the ichnospecies Pachypes ollieri as produced by nycteroleter pareiasauromorphs, and argue that the earliest occurrences of pareiasauromorph footprints precede the earliest occurrence of this group in the skeletal record by at least 10 million years.
- The first known fossil example of an iguana nesting burrow is reported from the Pleistocene Grotto Beach Formation (The Bahamas) by Martin et al. (2020).
- Fossil tracks possibly produced by a monjurosuchid-like choristoderan are described from the Albian Daegu Formation (South Korea) by Lee, Kong & Jung (2020), who attempt to determine the trackmaker's locomotory posture on land, and name a new ichnotaxon Novapes ulsanensis.
- New Early Triassic archosauriform track assemblage is described from the Gardetta Plateau (Western Alps, Italy) by Petti et al. (2020), who interpret this finding as evidence of the presence of archosauriforms at low latitudes soon after the Permian–Triassic extinction event, and name a new ichnotaxon Isochirotherium gardettensis.
- Fossil tracks produced by large crocodylomorphs, possibly moving bipedally, are described from the Lower Cretaceous Jinju Formation (South Korea) by Kim et al. (2020), who name a new ichnotaxon Batrachopus grandis.
- The first probable deinonychosaur (likely troodontid) tracks from Canada are described from the Campanian Wapiti Formation (Alberta) by Enriquez et al. (2020).
- Three sauropod trackways, probably produced by members of Titanosauriformes, are described from the Middle Jurassic (Bathonian) of the Castelbouc cave (France) by Moreau et al. (2020), who name a new ichnotaxon Occitanopodus gandi.
- New dinosaur tracks, including tracks representing the ichnogenus Deltapodus (probably produced by stegosaurians), are described from the Middle Jurassic of the Isle of Skye (Scotland, United Kingdom) by dePolo et al. (2020), expanding known diversity of dinosaur tracks from this locality.
- A review of the Late Cretaceous dinosaur tracksites of Bolivia is published by Meyer et al. (2020), who describe new dinosaur tracksites from the Chuquisaca and Potosi departments, and report parallel trackways of subadult ankylosaurs interpreted as evidence of social behavior amongst these dinosaurs.
- A study on Pleistocene bird tracks from the Cape south coast of South Africa is published by Helm et al. (2020), who report six tracksites with tracks produced by large birds, possibly indicating the existence of large Pleistocene forms of extant bird taxa.
- Mazin & Pouech (2020) describe non-pterodactyloid pterosaur tracks from the ichnological site known as "the Pterosaur Beach of Crayssac" (Tithonian; south-western France), evaluate the implications of these tracks for the knowledge of the terrestrial capabilities of non-pterodactyloid pterosaurs, and name a new ichnogenus Rhamphichnus.
- Dinosaur and synapsid tracks are described from the Pliensbachian-Toarcian of the northern main Karoo Basin (South Africa) by Bordy et al. (2020), who interpret these tracks as evidence that dinosaurs and synapsids were among the last inhabitants of the main Karoo Basin some 183 million years ago, and name a new ichnotaxon Afrodelatorrichnus ellenbergeri (likely of ornithischian affinity).
- New complex burrow system produced by geomyid rodents is described from the Oligocene Chilapa Formation (Mexico) by Guerrero-Arenas, Jiménez-Hidalgo & Genise (2020), who name a new ichnotaxon Yaviichnus iniyooensis, and interpret the complexity of these burrows as probable evidence of some degree of gregariousness of their producers.

== History of life in general ==
- Bobrovskiy et al. (2020) and van Maldegem et al. (2020) argue that putative sponge biomarkers can be generated from algal sterols, and interpret their findings as undermining the interpretation of biomarkers found in Precambrian rocks posited as evidence of existence of animals before the latest Ediacaran.
- Liu & Dunn (2020), describe filamentous organic structures preserved among frond-dominated fossil assemblages from the Ediacaran of Newfoundland (Canada), including filaments that appear to directly connect individual specimens of one rangeomorph taxon, and interpret this finding as possible evidence that Ediacaran frondose taxa were clonal.
- A study on the age of the Ediacaran biota from the Conception and St. John's Groups at Mistaken Point Ecological Reserve (Newfoundland, Canada) is published by Matthews et al. (2020).
- Approximately 563-million-year-old Ediacaran biota is reported from the Itajaí Basin (Brazil) by Becker-Kerber et al. (2020), representing the first record of Ediacaran macrofossils from Gondwana in deposits of similar age to the Avalon biota.
- An Ediacaran Lagerstätte with phosphatized animal-like eggs, embryos, acritarchs and cyanobacteria is reported from the Portfjeld Formation (Peary Land, Greenland) by Willman et al. (2020), representing the first record of a Doushantuo type preservation of fossils (with diagenetic phosphate replacement of originally organic material) from Laurentia reported so far.
- A study on biomarkers from Ediacaran sediments in the White Sea area is published by Bobrovskiy et al. (2020), who interpret their findings as indicating that eukaryotic algae were abundant among the food sources available for the Ediacaran biota.
- A study aiming to quantify changes of regional-scale diversity in marine fossils across time and space throughout the Phanerozoic is published by Close et al. (2020).
- A study on the structure of the Phanerozoic fossil record, aiming to determine relative impacts of extinctions and evolutionary radiations on the co-occurrence of species throughout the Phanerozoic, is published by Hoyal Cuthill, Guttenberg & Budd (2020), who argue that their findings refute any direct causal relationship between the proportionally most comparable mass radiations and extinctions.
- A study on the timing of known diversification and extinction events from Cambrian to Triassic, based on data from 11,000 marine fossil species, is published by Fan et al. (2020).
- The discovery of a new, exceptionally-preserved Cambrian biota, with fossils belonging to multiple phyla, is reported from the Guzhangian Longha Formation (Yunnan, China) by Peng et al. (2020).
- A study on changes in body size in skeletal animals from the Siberian Platform through the early Cambrian is published by Zhuravlev & Wood (2020).
- A study on the relationship between body size and extinction risk in the marine fossil record across the past 485 million years is published by Payne & Heim (2020).
- A study on the diversification rates of Ordovician animals living on hard substrates, aiming to determine when they experienced their greatest origination rates, is published by Franeck & Liow (2020).
- New information on the biotic composition of the Silurian Waukesha Lagerstätte (Wisconsin, United States) is presented by Wendruff et al. (2020), who report a biodiversity far richer than previously reported, and explore the taphonomic history of the fossils of this biota.
- A study on the diversity dynamics of the marine brachiopods, bivalves and gastropods throughout the Late Palaeozoic Ice Age is published by Seuss, Roden & Kocsis (2020).
- A study comparing the chemistry of fossil soft tissues of invertebrates and vertebrates from the Carboniferous Mazon Creek fossil beds (Illinois, United States) is published by McCoy et al. (2020), who report Tullimonstrum gregarium as grouping with vertebrates in their analysis.
- A study on the ages of known early–middle Permian tetrapod-bearing geological formations, as indicated by Bayesian tip dating methods, is published by Brocklehurst (2020), who interprets his findings as supporting the occurrence of the Olson's Extinction.
- A study on global infaunal response to the Permian–Triassic extinction event, as indicated by data from trace fossils, is published by Luo et al. (2020).
- A study on changes of marine latitudinal diversity gradient caused by the Permian–Triassic mass extinction is published by Song et al. (2020).
- A study on the latitudinal variation in Late Triassic tetrapod diversity, aiming to determine the relationship between latitudinal species richness and palaeoclimatic conditions, is published by Dunne et al. (2020).
- Description of new fossil material of Late Triassic tetrapods from the Hoyada del Cerro Las Lajas site (Ischigualasto Formation, Argentina), and a study on the age of tetrapod fossils from this site (including fossils of Pisanosaurus mertii) and their implications for the knowledge of the Late Triassic tetrapod evolution, is published by Desojo et al. (2020).
- A review of the evidence of a major change in ecological community structure during the Carnian, focusing on the temporal links of these biological changes with the Carnian Pluvial Event and on the role of volcanic eruptions and associated climate change as a possible trigger, is published by Dal Corso et al. (2020).
- An assemblage of fossilized vomits and coprolites is described from the Upper Triassic (Carnian) Reingraben Shales in Polzberg (Austria) by Lukeneder et al. (2020), who evaluate the implications of these bromalites for the knowledge of pelagic invertebrates-vertebrates trophic chain of the Late Triassic Polzberg biota, and interpret their finding as evidence indicating that the Mesozoic marine revolution has already started in the early Mesozoic.
- A study on the dynamics of the Adamanian/Revueltian faunal turnover, based on fossil data from the Petrified Forest National Park (Arizona, United States), is published by Hayes et al. (2020).
- A study on the palynological record from the Carnian–Norian transition in the western Barents Sea region is published by Klausen, Paterson & Benton (2020), who interpret their findings as indicating that major sea-level changes across the vast delta plains situated in the northern Pangaea might have triggered terrestrial turnovers during the Carnian–Norian transition and facilitated the gradual rise of the dinosaurs to ecosystem dominance.
- Wignall & Atkinson (2020) argue that the Triassic–Jurassic extinction event can be resolved into two distinct, short-lived extinction pulses separated by a several hundred-thousand-year interlude phase.
- A study on changes in shell size of marine bivalves and brachiopods from the Iberian Basin (Spain) across the Early Toarcian Oceanic Anoxic Event, aiming to determine the role of temperature for changes in body size of bivalves and brachiopods, is published by Piazza, Ullmann & Aberhan (2020).
- A study on the impact of warming and disturbance of the carbon cycle during the Toarcian Oceanic Anoxic Event on marine benthic macroinvertebrate assemblages from the Iberian Basin is published by Piazza, Ullmann & Aberhan (2020).
- A study on the persistence and abundance of an association of serpulids and hydroids during the Middle and Late Jurassic is published by Słowiński et al. (2020).
- Foster, Pagnac & Hunt-Foster (2020) describe the Late Jurassic biota from the Little Houston Quarry in the Black Hills of Wyoming, including the vertebrate fauna which is the second-most diverse in the entire Morrison Formation and the most diverse north of Como Bluff.
- A study on the age of the Huajiying Formation (China) and its implications for the knowledge of the timing of appearance and duration of the Jehol Biota is published by Yang et al. (2020).
- A study on the age of the biota from the Cretaceous Burmese amber from Hkamti is published by Xing & Qiu (2020).
- A study on extinction patterns of marine vertebrates during the last 20 million years of the Late Cretaceous, as indicated by fossils from northern Gulf of Mexico, is published by Ikejiri, Lu & Zhang (2020), who report evidence of two separate extinction events: one in the Campanian, and one at the end of the Maastrichtian.
- Rodríguez-Tovar et al. (2020) present evidence from trace fossils from the Chicxulub crater indicating that full recovery of the macrobenthic biota from this area was rapid, with the establishment of a well-developed tiered community within ~700 thousand years.
- A study on the impact of the early Cenozoic hyperthermal events on shallow marine benthic communities, based on data from fossils from the Gulf Coastal Plain, is published by Foster et al. (2020).
- A study on the geology and fauna (including hominins) of the new Mille-Logya site (Afar, Ethiopia) dated to between 2.914 and 2.443 Ma is published by Zeresenay Alemseged et al. (2020), who evaluate the implications of this site for the knowledge of how hominins and other fauna responded to environmental changes during this period.
- Studies on the magnitude and likely causes of megafaunal extinctions in the Indian subcontinent during the late Pleistocene and early Holocene are published by Jukar et al. (2020) and Turvey et al. (2020).
- A new, diverse megafauna assemblage that suffered extinction sometime after 40,100 (±1700) years ago is reported from the South Walker Creek fossil deposits (Queensland, Australia) by Hocknull et al. (2020), who evaluate the implications of this assemblage for prevailing megafauna extinction hypotheses for Sahul.
- A study on ancient DNA of vertebrates and plants recovered from fossils and sediment from Hall's Cave (Edwards Plateau, Texas, United States), evaluating its implications for the knowledge of the climatic fluctuations from the Pleistocene to the Holocene on the local ecosystem, is published by Seersholm et al. (2020).
- A study on the phylogenetic relationships of early amniotes, recovering Parareptilia and Varanopidae as nested within Diapsida, will be published by Ford & Benson (2020), who name a new clade Neoreptilia.
- Regional-scale diversity patterns for terrestrial tetrapods throughout their entire Phanerozoic evolutionary history are presented by Close et al. (2020), who attempt to determine how informative the fossil record is about true global paleodiversity.
- A study on the impact of the appearance and evolution of herbivorous tetrapods on the evolution of land plants from the Carboniferous to the Early Triassic is published by Brocklehurst, Kammerer & Benson (2020).
- A study the terrestrial and marine fossil record of Late Permian to Late Triassic tetrapods, comparing species-level tetrapod biodiversity across latitudinal bins, is published by Allen et al. (2020).
- In a study published by Chiarenza et al. (2020) the two main hypotheses for the mass extinction (the Deccan Traps and the Chicxulub impact) were evaluated using Earth System and Ecological modelling, confirming that the asteroid impact was the main driver of this extinction while the volcanism might have boosted the recovery instead.
- Bishop, Cuff & Hutchinson (2020) outline a workflow for integrating paleontological data with biomechanical principles and modeling techniques in order to create musculoskeletal models and study locomotor biomechanics of extinct animals, using Coelophysis as a case study.
- Saitta et al. (2020) propose a framework for studying sexual dimorphism in non-avian dinosaurs and other extinct taxa, focusing on likely secondary sexual traits and testing against all alternate hypotheses for variation in the fossil record.
- A study evaluating the utility of rare earth element profiles as proxies for biomolecular preservation in fossil bones, based on data from a specimen of Edmontosaurus annectens from the Standing Rock Hadrosaur Site (Hell Creek Formation; South Dakota, United States), is published by Ullmann et al. (2020).
- A study on the diversity and evolution of skull and jaw functions in sabre-toothed carnivores during the last 265 million years is published by Lautenschlager et al. (2020).

== Other research ==
- Evidence indicating that the Great Oxidation Event predated Paleoproterozoic glaciation in Russia and snowball Earth deposits in South Africa is presented by Warke et al. (2020), who argue that their findings preclude hypotheses of Earth's oxygenation in which global glaciation preceded or caused the evolution of oxygenic photosynthesis.
- A study on the timing of the onset and termination of the Shuram carbon isotope excursion is published by Rooney et al. (2020), who argue that this excursion was divorced from the rise of the earliest preserved animal ecosystems.
- A study on the causes of the Late Ordovician mass extinction, based on data from the Ordovician-Silurian boundary stratotype (Dob's Linn, Scotland), is published by Bond & Grasby (2020), who interpret their findings as evidence that this extinction event was caused by volcanism, warming and anoxia.
- Evidence of wildfires at the Frasnian−Famennian boundary is reported from Upper Devonian sections from western New York (United States) by Liu et al. (2020), who also provide an estimate of atmospheric O_{2} levels at this interval, and evaluate their implications for the knowledge of causes of the Late Devonian extinction.
- A study on the timing of the environmental changes associated with the Kellwasser events is published by Da Silva et al. (2020).
- Evidence of anomalously high mercury concentration in marine deposits encompassing the Hangenberg event from Carnic Alps (Italy and Austria) is presented by Rakociński et al. (2020), who argue that methylmercury poisoning in otherwise anoxic seas, caused by extensive volcanic activity, could be a direct kill mechanism of the end-Devonian Hangenberg extinction.
- A study on fossil plant spores with malformed sculpture and pigmented walls, recovered from terrestrial Devonian-Carboniferous boundary sections from East Greenland, is published by Marshall et al. (2020), who interpret their findings as evidence that the terrestrial mass extinction at the Devonian-Carboniferous boundary coincided with elevated UV-B radiation, indicative of ozone layer reduction.
- Fields et al. (2020) attempt to determine whether the dramatic drop in stratospheric ozone coinciding with the end-Devonian extinction events was caused by a nearby supernova explosion.
- A series of articles on the biostratigraphy of the Karoo Supergroup, providing a formal biozonation scheme for the Stormberg Group and dividing the Beaufort and Stormberg groups into nine tetrapod assemblage zones, is published in the June 2020 issue of the South African Journal of Geology.
- A study on the age of a pristine ash-fall deposit in the Karoo Lystrosaurus Assemblage Zone (South Africa) is published by Gastaldo et al. (2020), who report that turnover from the Daptocephalus Assemblage Zone to Lystrosaurus AZ in this basin occurred over 300 ka before the end-Permian marine event, and interpret their findings as refuting the concurrentness of turnovers in terrestrial and marine ecosystems at the end of the Permian.
- A study evaluating the contribution of loss of ecosystems on land and consequent massive terrestrial biomass oxidation to atmosphere–ocean biogeochemistry at the Permian–Triassic boundary is published by Dal Corso et al. (2020).
- A study aiming to determine the mechanism that drove vast stretches of the ocean to an anoxic state during the Permian–Triassic extinction event is published by Schobben et al. (2020).
- Evidence indicating that the Permian–Triassic extinction event was linked with ocean acidification due to carbon degassing from the Siberian sill intrusions is presented by Jurikova et al. (2020).
- Evidence from paired coronene and mercury spikes in stratigraphic sections in south China and Italy, indicative of the occurrence of two pulsed volcanic eruption events coinciding with the initiation of the end-Permian terrestrial ecological disturbance and marine extinction, is presented by Kaiho et al. (2020).
- A study on variations of ~10-Myr scale monsoon dynamics during the early Mesozoic, and on their impact on climate and ecosystem dynamics (including the dispersal of early dinosaurs), is published by Ikeda, Ozaki & Legrand (2020).
- New geochronologic and paleoclimatic data from Carnian-aged strata in the Ischigualasto-Villa Unión Basin (Argentina) is presented by Mancuso et al. (2020), who interpret their findings as indicating that the Carnian Pluvial Event interval in western Gondwana was warmer and more humid than periods before or after this interval, confirming that the CPE was a global event.
- A study on the age of the top of the Moenkopi Formation, the lower Blue Mesa Member, and the lower and upper Sonsela Member of the Chinle Formation is published by Rasmussen et al. (2020), who argue that the biotic turnover preserved in the mid-Sonsela Member at the Petrified Forest National Park was a mid-Norian event.
- A study on ocean temperatures during the Triassic–Jurassic extinction event is published by Petryshyn et al. (2020), who report no evidence for short-term cooling or initial warming across the 1-80,000 years of the extinction event.
- Evidence of low ocean sulfate levels at the end-Triassic mass extinction, linked to rapid development of marine anoxia, is presented by He et al. (2020).
- A study on the causes of the negative organic carbon isotope excursion associated with the end-Triassic mass extinction, based on data from its type locality in the Bristol Channel Basin (United Kingdom), is published by Fox et al. (2020), who interpret this isotopic excursion as caused by an abrupt relative sea level drop rather than by massive inputs of exogenous light carbon into the atmosphere, and argue that the disappearance of marine biota at the type locality is the result of local environmental changes and does not mark the global extinction event, while the main extinction phase occurred slightly later in marine strata.
- Evidence of increasing atmospheric CO_{2} concentration at the onset of the end-Triassic extinction event, based on data from fossil leaves of the seed fern Lepidopteris ottonis from southern Sweden, is presented by Slodownik, Vajda & Steinthorsdottir (2020).
- A review of the geology, paleoecology and taxonomic status of the fauna from the Cretaceous Kem Kem Beds of Morocco is published by Ibrahim et al. (2020).
- Klages et al. (2020) report evidence from the West Antarctic shelf indicating the occurrence of a temperate lowland rainforest environment at a palaeolatitude of about 82° S during the Late Cretaceous (Turonian–Santonian).
- A review and revision of the stratigraphy of the Hell Creek Formation is published by Fowler (2020).
- A study on the timing of a volcanic outgassing at the end of the Cretaceous, and on its implications for the knowledge of causes of the Cretaceous-Paleogene mass extinction, is published by Hull et al. (2020).
- A study on paleosols from the eastern edge of the Deccan Volcanic Province (central India), evaluating their implications for reconstructions of climate and terrestrial environments of India before and after the Cretaceous–Paleogene extinction event and for the knowledge of causes of this extinction event, is published by Dzombak et al. (2020).
- A detailed record of molecular burn markers from the Chicxulub crater and in ocean sediments distant from the impact site is presented by Lyons et al. (2020), who interpret their findings as indicating rapid heating after the impact and a fossil carbon source, and argue that soot from the target rock immediately contributed to global cooling and darkening after the impact at the end of the Cretaceous.
- A study on the origin, recovery, and development of microbial life in the Chicxulub crater after the impact at the end of the Cretaceous, and on the environmental conditions in the crater up to ~4 million years after the Cretaceous–Paleogene extinction event, is published by Schaefer et al. (2020).
- A study on Earth's climate throughout the Cenozoic era, based on a highly resolved and well-dated record of benthic carbon and oxygen isotopes from deep-sea foraminifera, is published by Westerhold et al. (2020).
- Van Couvering & Delson (2020) define 17 African land mammal ages covering the Cenozoic record of the Afro-Arabian continent.
- A study on the amount and makeup of the carbon added to the ocean during the Paleocene–Eocene Thermal Maximum, based on geochemical data from planktic foraminifera, is published by Haynes & Hönisch (2020), who interpret their findings as indicating that volcanic emissions were the main carbon source responsible for PETM warming.
- Evidence from Eocene plant fossils from the Bangong-Nujiang suture indicating that the Tibetan Plateau area hosted a diverse subtropical ecosystem approximately 47 million years ago and that this area was both low and humid at the time is presented by Su et al. (2020).
- A study on the climate evolution across the Oligocene, examining the relationship between global temperatures and continental-scale polar ice sheets following the establishment of ice sheets on Antarctica, is published by O'Brien et al. (2020).
- A study aiming to test the hypothesis that the emergence of the Southeast Asian islands played a significant role in driving the cooling of Earth's climate since the Miocene Climatic Optimum is published by Park et al. (2020).
- A study on the environment at Olduvai Gorge at the emergence of the Acheulean technology 1.7 million years ago, based on data from fossil lipid biomarkers, is published by Sistiaga et al. (2020).
- A study on freshwater fauna and flora found in a sediment sample from the Yuka mammoth carcass, evaluating its implications for reconstructions of the waterbody type where the mammoth was preserved and for the knowledge of the nature of the waterbodies that existed in Beringia during the MIS3 climatic optimum, is published by Neretina et al. (2020).
- A study on the Neogene paleobotanical record and climate in the northernmost part of the Central Andean Plateau, based on data from the Descanso Formation (Peru), is published by Martínez et al. (2020), who report the earliest evidence of a puna-like ecosystem in the Pliocene and a montane ecosystem without modern analogs in the Miocene, as well as evidence of wetter paleoclimatic conditions than previously estimated by regional climate model simulations.
- A study on environmental changes in Southeast Asia from the Early Pleistocene to the Holocene, based on stable isotope data from Southeast Asian mammals, and on their impact on the evolution of mammals (including hominins), is published by Louys & Roberts (2020).
- A study on the climate variability in the southwest Indian Ocean area throughout the past ~8000 years, evaluating its implications for the knowledge of possible causes of extinction of megafauna from Madagascar and Mascarene Islands, is published by Li et al. (2020).
- Van Neer et al. (2020) report faunal remains from the Takarkori rock shelter in the Acacus Mountains region (Libya), and evaluate their implications for the knowledge of the climate and hydrography of the Sahara throughout the Holocene.
- New Mesozoic and Paleogene amber occurrences, preserving diverse inclusions of arthropods, plants and fungi, are reported from Australia and New Zealand by Stilwell et al. (2020).
