= Leptothyrella =

Leptothyrella may refer to:

- Leptothyrella (brachiopod), a genus of brachiopods in the family Platidiidae
- Leptothyrella (fungus), a genus of fungi in the division Ascomycota, order and family unassigned
