= Acruxaster =

Acruxaster Temporal range: Ludlow–Lochkovian

Scientific classification
- Kingdom: Animalia
- Phylum: Echinodermata
- Class: Asteroidea
- Order: †Euaxosida
- Family: †Acruxasteridae
- Genus: †Acruxaster; Jell, 2026
- Species: †A. richi

Binomial name
- †Acruxaster richi Withers & Keble, 1934

Synonyms
- Petraster richi Withers & Keble, 1934

Extinct genus of euaxosid echinoderm

Acruxaster is an extinct euaxosid echinoderm from the Silurian and Devonian of Australia. It is a monotypic genus, containing only Acruxaster richi.

== Discovery and naming ==
The holotype material for Acruxaster was found in the Silurian aged Humevale Formation of Clonbinane, Australia, in 1934 and originally described as Petraster richi. This remained until 2026, when it was assigned under the new genus of Acruxaster after Devonian material was found from the same formation.

The generic name Acruxaster derives from the name of the star Acrux, found within southern constellation of Crux.

== Description ==
Acruxaster richi is a small starfish, with up to five arms that can reach up to 60 mm (2.4 in) in length. The main disc is notably flexible, and half the length of the arms, only attaining a diameter of 30 mm (1.2 in). Both the disc and arms, on the dorsal side of the organism, are covered in a strong, meshed pattern of star-shaped tuberculate plates, which bear spines on them. Along each arm are rows of distinct, J-shaped transverse ridges, separated down the middle of the arm by a shallow furrow.
