= I. aemula =

I. aemula may refer to:

- Idia aemula, the common idia, powdered snout or waved tabby, a moth species found from Canada south to Florida and Texas and in most of Eurasia
- Inquisitor aemula, a sea snail species

== See also ==
- Aemula
