= Comptonia =

Comptonia may refer to:

- Comptonia (plant), a monotypic genus in the family Myricaceae
- Comptonia (echinoderm), an extinct genus of echinoderms in the family Goniasteridae
