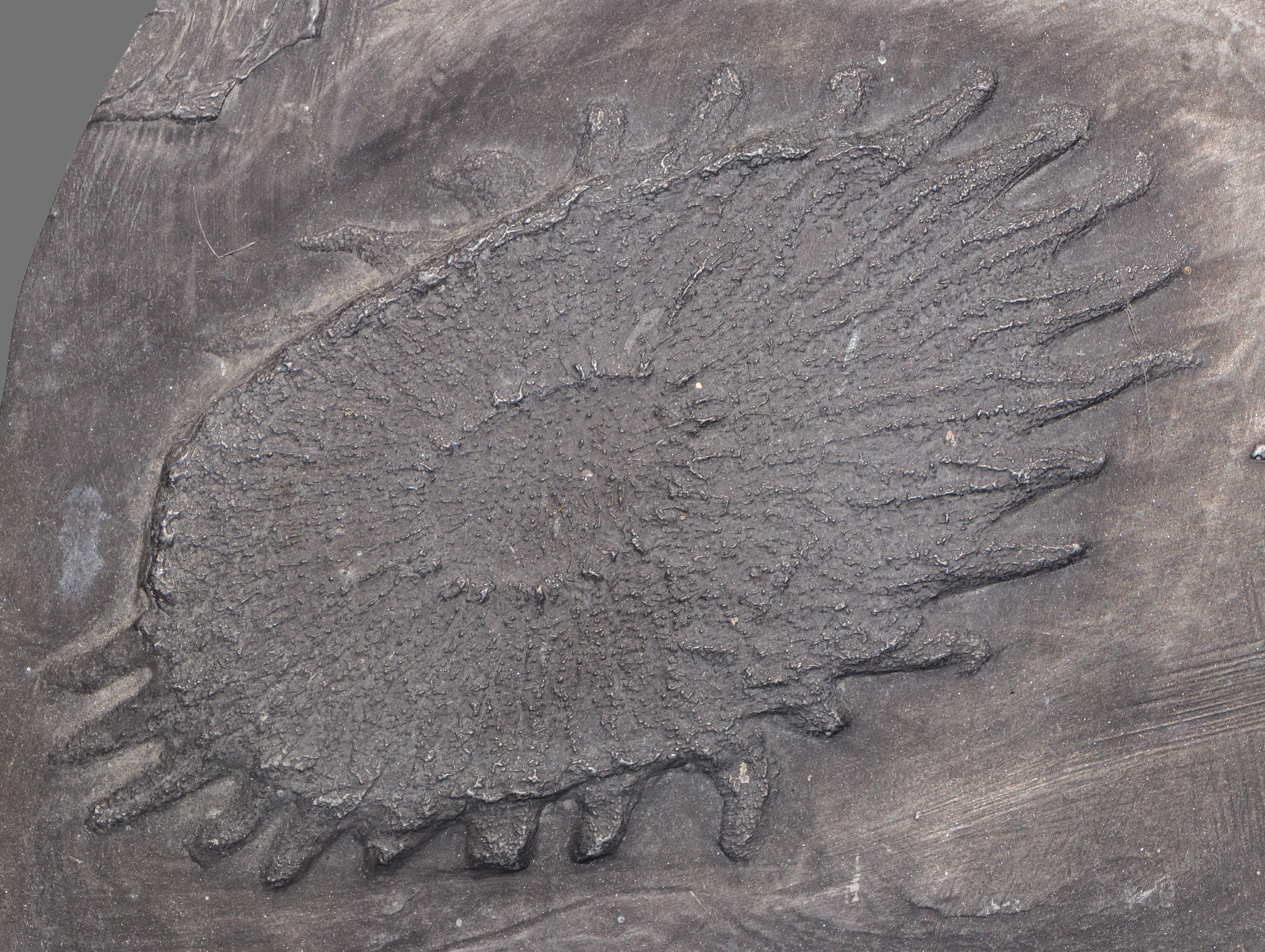
- Palaeosolaster gregoryi at Bremerhaven Zoo

Scientific classification
- Kingdom: Animalia
- Phylum: Echinodermata
- Class: Asteroidea
- Order: †Euaxosida; Blake, 2018

Families
- †Cnemidactinidae; †Helianthasteridae; †Lacertasteridae; †Lepidasteridae; †Mesopalaeasteridae; †Omanasteridae; †Palasterinidae; †Platanasteridae; †Acruxasteridae

= Euaxosida =

Euaxosida Temporal range: Middle Ordovician–Early Permian

Extinct order of starfish

Euaxosida is an extinct order of starfish that lived worldwide during most of the Paleozoic. It was described in 2018 by geologist Daniel B. Blake.

== Distribution and stratigraphic range ==
Euaxosida had a cosmopolitan marine distribution spanning approximately 175 million years, from the Middle Ordovician to the Early Permian.

=== Ordovician ===
Early members appeared in the Middle to Late Ordovician across Laurentia (North America), Armorica (France, such as Petraster), and northern Gondwana (Morocco, such as Degeneraster).

=== Silurian and Devonian ===
The order diversified across Europe (including England and the Hunsrück Slate of Germany), North America, Australia (Acruxaster), and high-latitude marine basins of South America (Paraná Basin, Brazil, represented by Magnasterella).

=== Permian ===
The youngest known representatives belong to the family Omanasteridae (Omanaster imbricatus), recorded from Sakmarian (Lower Permian) shallow-marine deposits in Oman.
