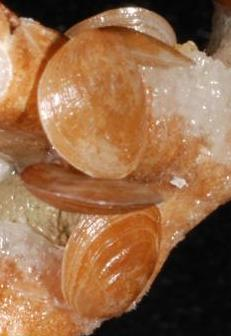

Scientific classification
- Kingdom: Animalia
- Phylum: Brachiopoda
- Class: Rhynchonellata
- Order: Terebratulida
- Family: Platidiidae
- Genus: Amphithyris; Thomson, 1918

= Amphithyris =

Genus of brachiopods

Amphithyris is a genus of brachiopods belonging to the family Platidiidae.

The species of this genus are found worldwide, but several occur around Australia and New Zealand.

Species:

- Amphithyris buckmani Thomson, 1918
- Amphithyris cavernicola Nauendorf, Wörheide & Lüter, 2014
- Amphithyris comitodentis Nauendorf, Wörheide & Lüter, 2014
- Amphithyris hallettensis Foster, 1974
- Amphithyris parva Mackinnon, Hiller, Long & Marshall, 2008
- Amphithyris richardsonae Campbell & Fleming, 1981
- Amphithyris seminula (Philippi, 1836)
