= Platidia =

Scientific classification
- Domain: Eukaryota
- Kingdom: Animalia
- Phylum: Brachiopoda
- Class: Rhynchonellata
- Order: Terebratulida
- Family: Platidiidae
- Genus: Platidia; Costa, 1852

Synonyms
- Morrisia Davidson, 1852; Platydia Costa, 1852 (Missp.)

Genus of brachiopods

Platidia is a genus of brachiopods belonging to the family Platidiidae.

The genus has almost cosmopolitan distribution.

== Extant species ==
- Platidia anomioides (Scacchi & Philippi, 1844)
- Platidia clepsydra Cooper, 1973

== Extinct species ==
- †Platidia blowi Cooper, 1978
- †Platidia marylandica Clark & Martin, 1901
