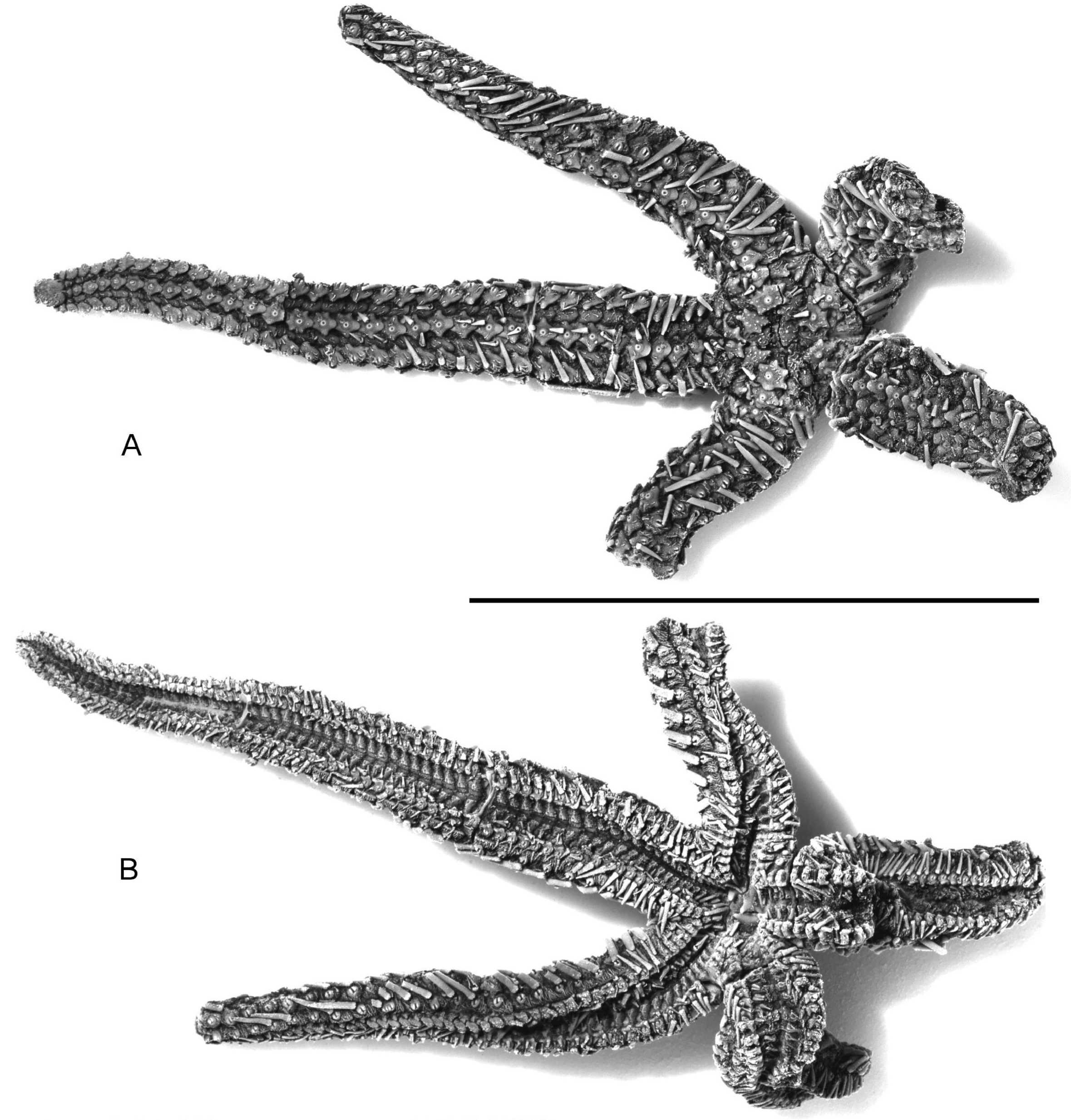
- Fossil of A. sumralli

Scientific classification
- Domain: Eukaryota
- Kingdom: Animalia
- Phylum: Echinodermata
- Class: Asteroidea
- Order: Forcipulatida
- Family: †Terminasteridae
- Genus: †Alkaidia; Blake & Reid, 1998

Type species
- †Alkaidia sumralli Blake & Reid, 1998

Other species
- †A. megaungula Ewin & Gale, 2020

= Alkaidia =

Alkaidia Temporal range: Barremian–Cenomanian

Extinct genus of starfishes

Alkaidia is an extinct genus of sea stars which lived in the western Tethys Ocean from the Barremian to Cenomanian stages of the Cretaceous period. It was first described in 1998, and two species are currently assigned to it. The type species, A. sumralli, is known from both complete and fragmentary specimens collected in Texas, and fossils of an earlier species, A. megaungula, have been found in Morocco.

== Discovery and naming ==
The fossilized remains of Alkaidia were first described by paleontologists Daniel B. Blake and Robert Reid, III in a 1998 publication describing some Albian-aged starfish fossils from north-central Texas. The authors determined that over 50 specimens (some complete and other fragmentary) originating from the Washita Group represented a new genus and species which they named Alkaidia sumralli. The generic name references Alkaid, a star in the constellation Ursa Major, while the specific name honors Colin Sumrall, who discovered and prepared some of the specimens, including the holotype. A complete specimen (1786TXI) found in deposits of the Del Rio Formation at Waco Dam Quarry was designated as the holotype, and was placed in the Texas Memorial Museum. Some additional fragments from the same locality and from the Paw Paw Formation were designated as paratypes.

A second species of Alkaidia was described in 2020 by paleontologists Timothy A. M. Ewin and Andrew S. Gale based on material originating from the Taba Starfish Bed of the Barremian-aged Taboulouart Formation in Morocco and purchased from commercial fossil collectors. This species was named Alkaidia megaungula, the specific name meaning "large hoof" in Greek and referencing the large terminal ossicle of this species, which resembles a hoof. The studied specimens are well-preserved and represent numerous individuals of various growth stages, allowing an ontogenetic series to be shown.
