= Aulographaceae =

Scientific classification
- Kingdom: Fungi
- Division: Ascomycota
- Class: Dothideomycetes
- Subclass: incertae sedis
- Family: Aulographaceae; Luttr. ex P.M.Kirk, P.F.Cannon & J.C.David (2001)

Type genus
- Aulographum Lib.(1834)

Genera
- Aulographum; Polyclypeolina

Family of fungi

The Aulographaceae are a family of fungi with an uncertain taxonomic placement in the class Dothideomycetes.
