= Leptothyrella (brachiopod) =

Scientific classification
- Kingdom: Animalia
- Phylum: Brachiopoda
- Class: Rhynchonellata
- Order: Terebratulida
- Family: Platidiidae
- Genus: Leptothyrella; Muir-Wood, 1965

Genus of brachiopods

Leptothyrella is a genus of brachiopods belonging to the family Platidiidae.

The species of this genus are found in the coasts of Africa.

Species:

- Leptothyrella fijiensis Bitner, 2008
- Leptothyrella galatheae Zezina, 1981
- Leptothyrella ignota (Muir-Wood, 1959)
- Leptothyrella incerta (Davidson, 1878)
