= Martsaphyton =

Martsaphyton Temporal range: Darriwilian

Scientific classification
- Kingdom: Animalia
- Phylum: Cnidaria
- Subphylum: Medusozoa
- Genus: †Martsaphyton
- Species: †M. moxi

Binomial name
- †Martsaphyton moxi Tinn et al., 2020

Extinct genus of cnidarians

Martsaphyton is an extinct genus of medusozoan that lived during the Darriwilian stage of the Ordovician period.

== Distribution ==
Martsaphyton moxi Fossils are known from Estonia.
