= Platidiidae =

Scientific classification
- Kingdom: Animalia
- Phylum: Brachiopoda
- Class: Rhynchonellata
- Order: Terebratulida
- Superfamily: Platidioidea
- Family: Platidiidae; Dall, 1870

Family of brachiopods

Platidiidae is a family of brachiopods belonging to the order Terebratulida.

== Genera ==
Genera:

- Aemula Steinich, 1968
- Amphithyris Thomson, 1918
- Annuloplatidia Zezina, 1981
- Dicrostia Cooper, 1978
- Epacrothyris Hiller & MacKinnon, 2000
- Erihadrosia Hiller & MacKinnon, 2000
- Leptothyrella Muir-Wood, 1965
- Neoaemula MacKinnon, Hiller, Long & Marshall, 2008
- Phaneropora Zezina, 1981
- Platidia, Costa, 1852
- Praemagadina MacKinnon, 1993
- Scumulus Steinich, 1968
- Tioriorithyris Hiller & MacKinnon, 2000
