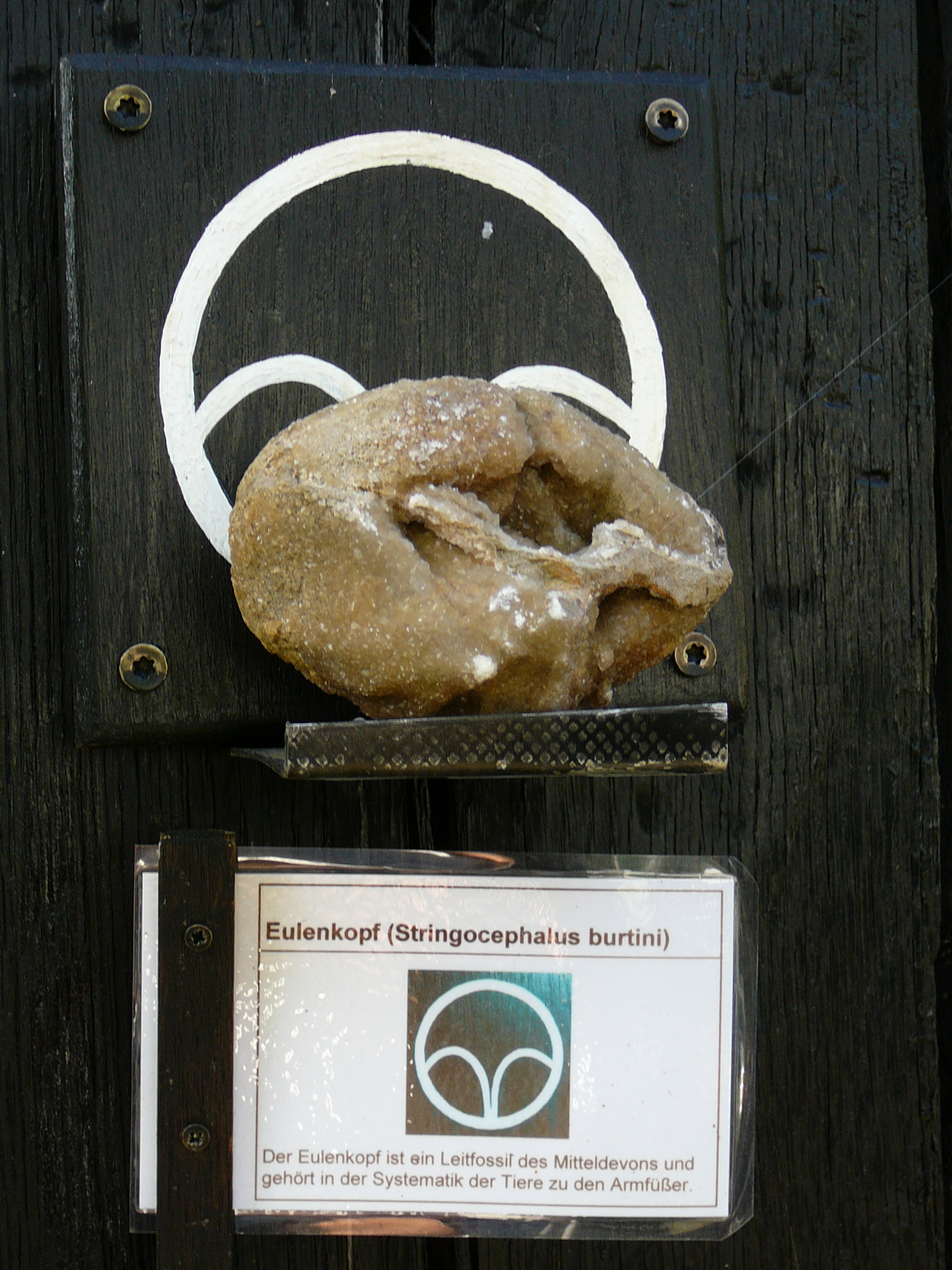
- Stringocephalus burtini

Scientific classification
- Kingdom: Animalia
- Phylum: Brachiopoda
- Class: Rhynchonellata
- Order: Terebratulida
- Family: †Stringocephalidae
- Subfamily: †Stringocephalinae
- Genus: †Stringocephalus; Defrance in De Blainville, 1825

Species
- Stringocephalus burtini Defrance, 1825; Stringocephalus nevadensis Frost and Langenheim Jr., 1966

= Stringocephalus =

Stringocephalus Temporal range: Middle Devonian

Extinct genus of brachiopods

Stringocephalus is an extinct genus of large brachiopods; between 388.1 to 376.1 million years old they are usually found as fossils in Devonian marine rocks. Several forms of the genus are known; they may be found in western North America, northern Europe (especially Poland), Asia and the Canning Basin of Western Australia. Several different types are known; they share a well-developed, curved structure shaped like a beak. Some of the largest specimens discovered to date have been found in China.
