= Armilimax =

Armilimax Temporal range: Wuliuan

Scientific classification
- Kingdom: Animalia
- Clade: Bilateria
- Genus: †Armilimax
- Species: †A. pauljamisoni

Binomial name
- †Armilimax pauljamisoni Kimmig & Selden 2020

Extinct genus of shelled animals

Armilimax (meaning 'armoured slug') is an extinct genus of shell-bearing slug-like animal known from a single specimen found in an exposed portion of the Spence Shale in the Wellsville Mountains in Box Elder County, Utah. As such, its morphology is ambiguous; it bears a seemingly U-shaped gut and, at the opposite end of its body, a shell without an apex. It has been tentatively interpreted as resembling Halkieria, but it does not contain sclerites. It is the first of its kind in the Great Basin. Only one species is known: Armilimax pauljamisoni.
