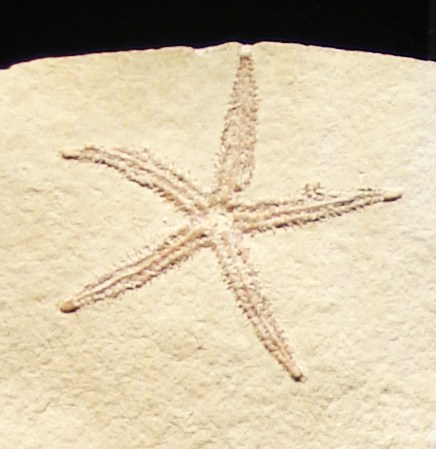
- Fossil of Terminaster cancriformis

Scientific classification
- Kingdom: Animalia
- Phylum: Echinodermata
- Class: Asteroidea
- Order: Forcipulatida
- Family: †Terminasteridae; Gale, 2011

Genera
- †Alkaidia; †Terminaster

= Terminasteridae =

Terminasteridae Temporal range: Callovian–Cenomanian

Extinct family of starfish

Terminasteridae is a family of fossil starfish which lived from the Jurassic to Cretaceous periods. It was erected in 2011 as a monotypic group to contain only the type genus Terminaster (which it is named after). A second genus, Alkaidia, was originally described as a member of the extant family Benthopectinidae, but was transferred to Terminasteridae in 2020.
