= Aemula =

Aemula Temporal range: Cretaceous

Scientific classification
- Kingdom: Animalia
- Phylum: Brachiopoda
- Class: Rhynchonellata
- Order: Terebratulida
- Family: Platidiidae
- Subfamily: Platidiinae
- Genus: †Aemula; Steinich, 1968

Species
- †Aemula inusitata

Genus of brachiopods

Aemula is an extinct genus of brachiopods that lived during the Cretaceous period. The pedunculate brachiopod species Aemula inusitata had lived on the bodies of larger animals which served for enough feeding surface, since no large attachment sites were available on the Maastrichtian chalk of the sea floor (Gould, 1977, p. 333). It was a very small animal, having a maximum length of 7 mm, and is believed to have been short lived as interpreted from its growth lines (Surlyk, 1974; Gould, 1977, p. 332).
