= Comptonia (echinoderm) =

Comptonia Temporal range: Albian-Cenomanian 113–93.5 Ma

Scientific classification
- Kingdom: Animalia
- Phylum: Echinodermata
- Class: Asteroidea
- Order: Valvatida
- Family: Goniasteridae
- Genus: †Comptonia; Gray, 1840

Species
- †Comptonia bretoni Gale, 2020; †Comptonia bruni Breton, 1992; †Comptonia elegans Gray, 1840 (type); †Comptonia soullansensis Breton, 1992; †Comptonia stelcki McLearn, 1944; †Comptonia thierryi Breton, 1992; †Comptonia wightensis Breton, 1992

Extinct genus of sea stars

Comptonia is an extinct genus of prehistoric sea stars in the family Goniasteridae. Species are from the Cretaceous of Canada (Alberta), France and the United Kingdom. The type species, C. elegans (syn. Goniaster (Stellaster) elegans, Stellaster elegans) was recovered from France.
