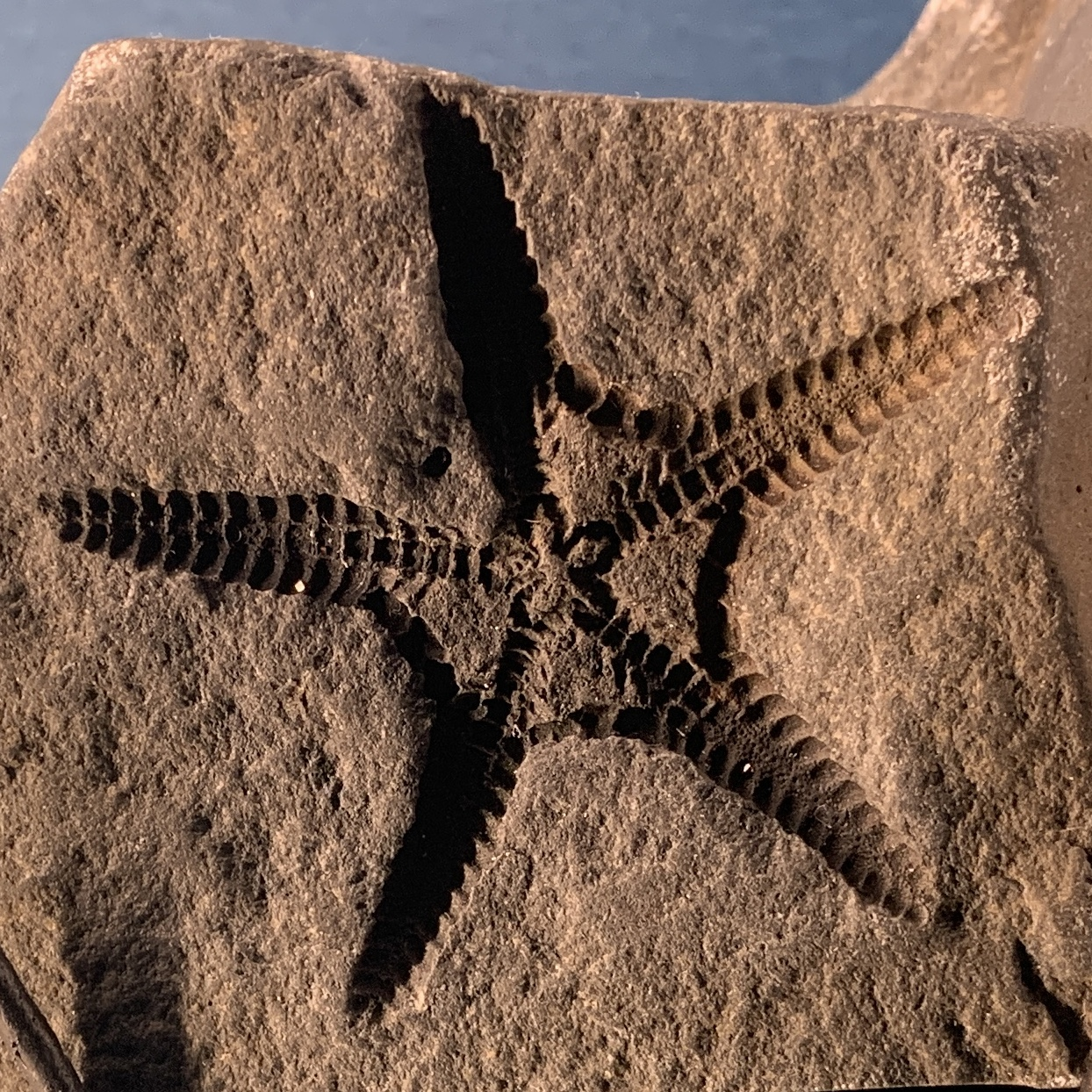
- Petraster sp.

Scientific classification
- Kingdom: Animalia
- Phylum: Echinodermata
- Class: Asteroidea
- Genus: †Petraster; Billings, 1858

Species
- †Coelaster americanus (d'Orbigny, 1850); †Palasterina kinahani (Baily, 1878); †Palasterina ramseyensis (Hicks, 1873); †Palasterina rigidus (Billings, 1857); †Petraster angustior Withers & Keble, 1934; †Petraster crozonensis Blake et al., 2016; †Petraster richi Withers & Keble, 1934; †Petraster smythi McCoy, 1874

Synonyms
- Uranaster Gregory, 1899

= Petraster =

Petraster Temporal range: 449.5–418.7 Ma

Extinct genus of starfish

Petraster is a genus of extinct starfish that lived from the upper Ordovician to the late Silurian. The genus has a large distribution range, fossils have been found in North America, and Australia.

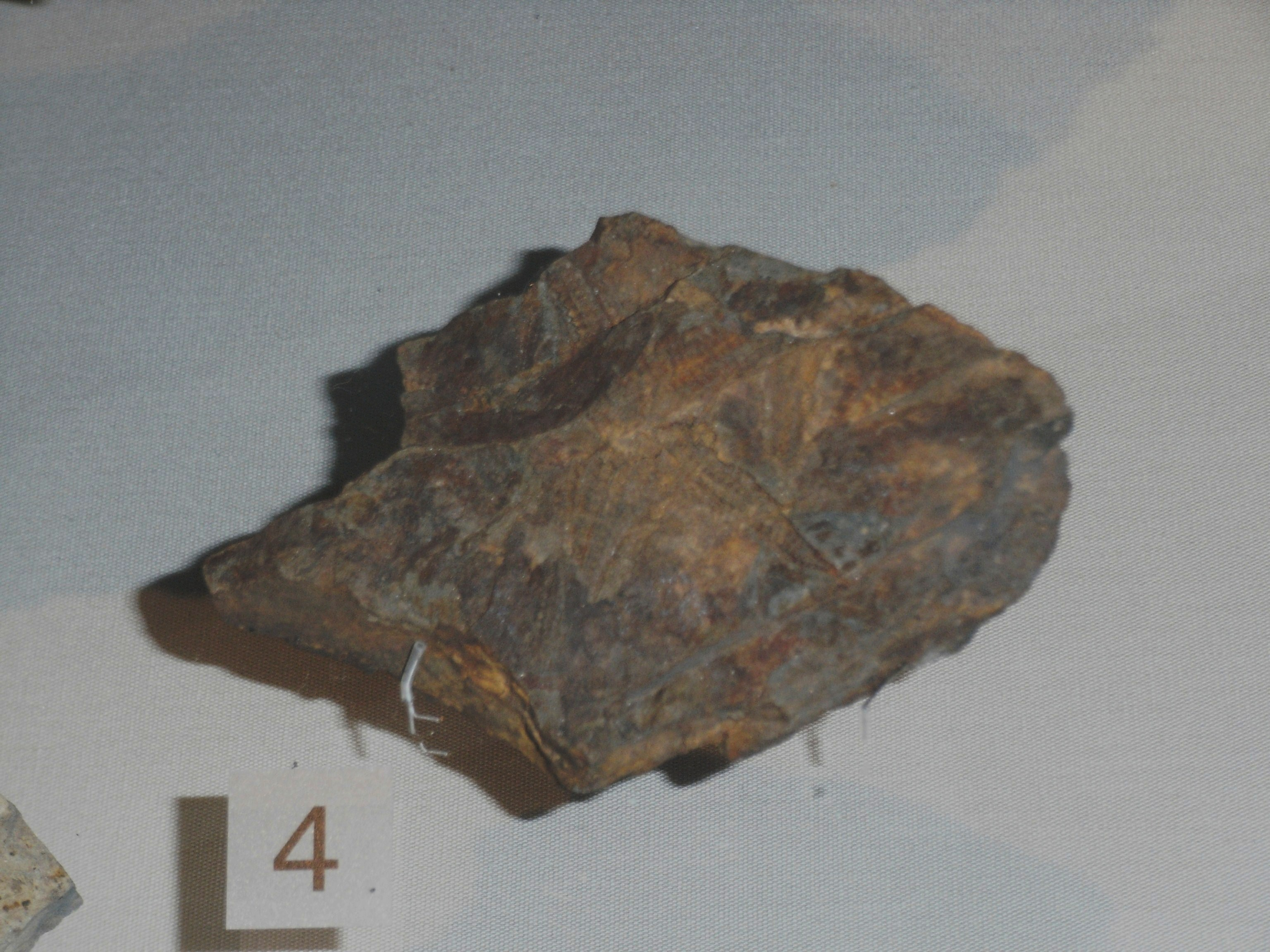
P. kinahani
