= Species of Dimetrodon =

Genus of carnivorous synapsids

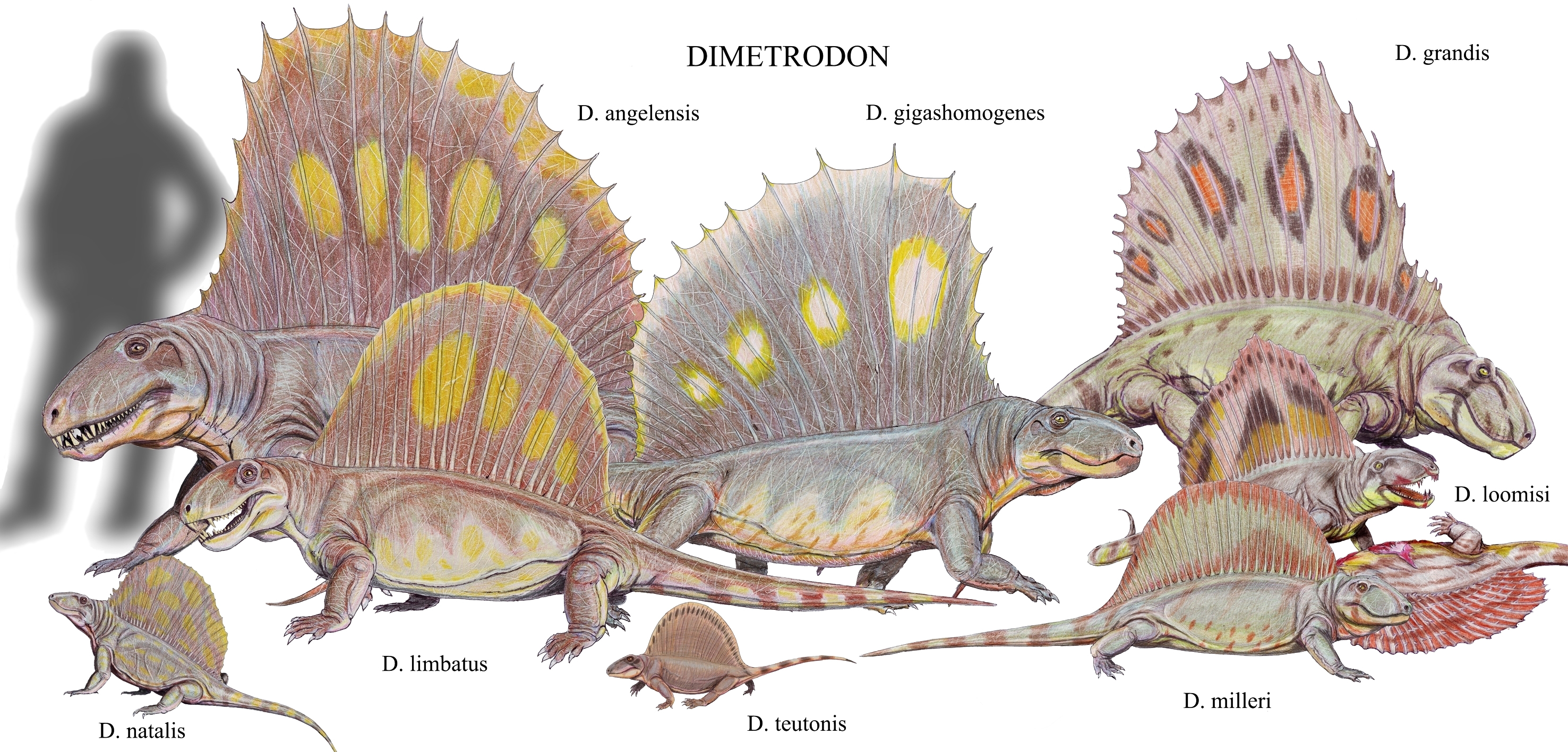
Artist impressions of various Dimetrodon species to scale

The synapsid genus Dimetrodon has had a complex taxonomic history. Since the genus was coined by Edward Drinker Cope in 1878, twenty species have been named. Of these, approximately a dozen are currently considered valid, and the status of one (D. kempae) is ambiguous. Many have been synonymized with existing species, such as D. gigas becoming a partial synonym of D. grandis, while others now belong to different genera, such as D. longiramus being assigned to Secodontosaurus in 1940. Most species of Dimetrodon are recognised based on body size, geography, and stratigraphy, as many are too fragmentary to be diagnosed through morphology alone.

== Classification scheme ==
In 1940, Alfred Romer and Llewellyn Ivor Price put forward a classification scheme wherein all species of Dimetrodon known at the time fell into one of two "series": series A, and series B. Series A consists of species with short vertebral columns, short lower limbs, and more convex ventral (bottom) margins to their maxillae. Series B, conversely, consists of taxa with the opposite condition, as well as shorter and lower skulls with smaller inferior temporal fenestrae. Attempts to fit species named afterward into this scheme have proven complicated. In 1962, E. C. Olsen, when naming D. angelensis, suggested that it fit into series B, though in 1986 similarities in cranial anatomy were noted which more closely resemble series A.

== Summary ==
Species	Authority	Location	Series	Synonyms	Images
Dimetrodon limbatus	(Cope, 1877) Romer and Price, 1940	Oklahoma; Texas; Ohio (tentatively)	A	Clepsydrops limbatus Cope, 1877; Dimetrodon incisivus Cope, 1878; Dimetrodon rectiformis Cope, 1878; Dimetrodon semiradicatus Cope, 1881	
Dimetrodon natalis	(Cope, 1878) Romer, 1936	Texas	B	Clepsydrops natalis Cope, 1878	
Dimetrodon macrospondylus	(Cope, 1884) Case, 1907	Texas	B	Clepsydrops macrospondylus Cope, 1884; Dimetrodon platycentrus Case, 1907	
Dimetrodon dollovianus	(Cope, 1888) Case, 1907	Texas	B	Embolophorus dollovianus Cope, 1888	
Dimetrodon grandis	(Case, 1907) Romer and Price, 1940	Oklahoma; Texas	A	Clepsydrops gigas Cope, 1878; Dimetrodon gigas Cope, 1878; Theropleura grandis Case, 1907; Bathyglyptus theodori Case, 1911; Dimetrodon maximus Romer 1936	
Dimetrodon giganhomogenes	Case, 1907	Texas	B		
Dimetrodon booneorum	Romer, 1937	Texas	A		
Dimetrodon loomisi	Romer, 1937	Texas; Oklahoma	B		
Dimetrodon milleri	Romer, 1937	Texas	A		
Dimetrodon angelensis	Olson, 1962	Texas	B?		
Dimetrodon occidentalis	Berman, 1977	Arizona; New Mexico; Utah			
Dimetrodon teutonis	Berman, Reisz, Martens, & Henrici, 2001	Germany			
Dimetrodon borealis	(Leidy, 1854) Brink, Maddin, Evans, & Reisz, 2015	Prince Edward Island		Bathygnathus borealis Leidy, 1854	

== Valid species ==
=== Dimetrodon limbatus ===
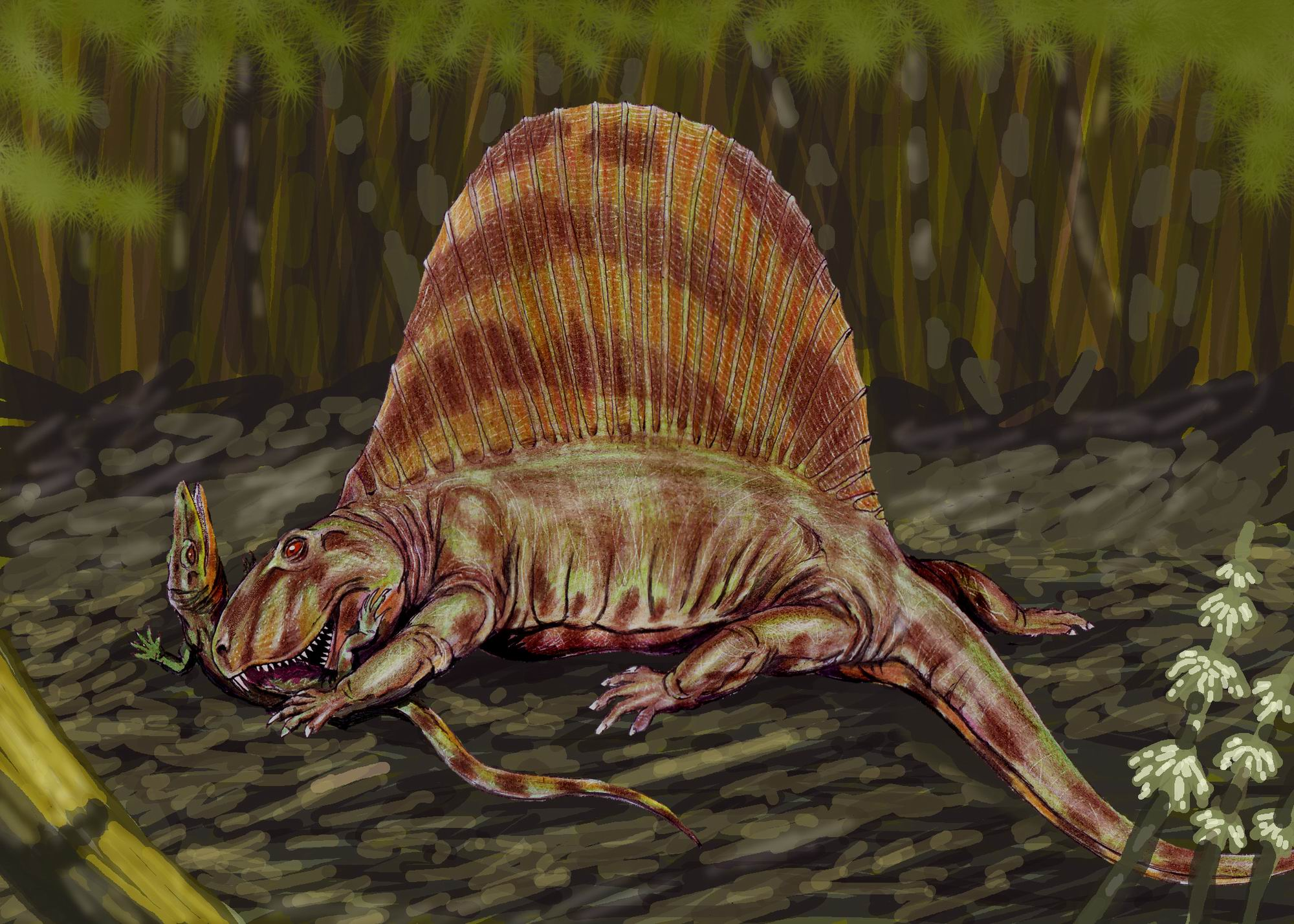
Restoration of Dimetrodon limbatus feeding on Varanosaurus acutirostris

Dimetrodon limbatus was first described by Edward Drinker Cope in 1877 as Clepsydrops limbatus. (The name Clepsydrops was first coined by Cope in 1875 for sphenacodontid remains from Vermilion County, Illinois, and was later employed for many sphenacontid specimens from Texas; many new species of sphenacodontids from Texas were assigned to either Clepsydrops or Dimetrodon in the late nineteenth and early twentieth centuries.) Based on a specimen from the Red Beds of Texas, it was the first known sail-backed synapsid. In 1940, paleontologists Alfred Romer and Llewellyn Ivor Price reassigned C. limbatus to the genus Dimetrodon, making D. limbatus the type species of Dimetrodon. Remains tentatively assigned to this species are also known from Washington County, Ohio, which correspond to a relatively large individual. These remains are slightly older than others assigned to D. limbatus from the west, although potential D. limbatus remains from New Mexico may be concurrent with it.

In 1940, Romer and Price provided two separate size estimates for D. limbatus. Specimens interpreted as females were estimated to have had an upper body length of 256.5 cm (8.42 ft) and its body mass at 97 kg (214 lb); males, meanwhile, were estimated at 283.5 cm (9.30 ft) and 129 kg (284 lb). The skull length of D. limbatus was 40.5 centimetres (15.9 in) in length.

=== Dimetrodon natalis ===
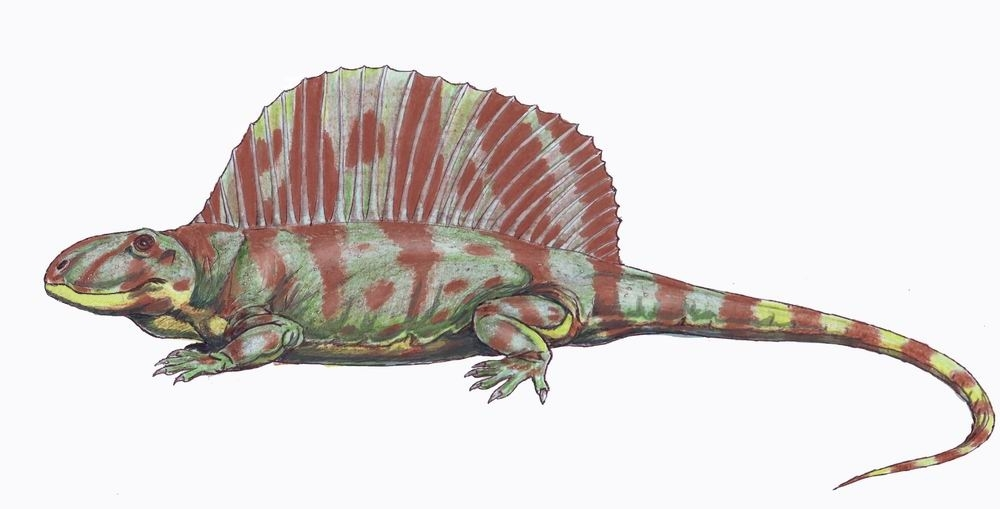
Restoration of Dimetrodon natalis

Dimetrodon natalis was first described by Cope in 1878 as Clepsydrops natalis. Paleontologist Alfred Romer reclassified it as Dimetrodon natalis in 1936. D. natalis was the smallest known species of Dimetrodon at that time, and was found alongside remains of the larger-bodied D. limbatus. D. natalis is diagnosed, among other traits, by its low and short skull, small temporal fenestra, and relatively underdeveloped "notch" between the maxilla and premaxilla. Romer and Llewellyn Ivor Price suggested that D. natalis may have been ancestral to D. dollovianus and D. loomisi. The body length of D. natalis is estimated at 169.1 cm (5.55 ft) and its body mass is estimated at 21–37 kg (46–82 lb).

=== Dimetrodon macrospondylus ===
Dimetrodon macrospondylus was first described by Cope in 1884 as Clepsydrops macrospondylus. In 1907, Case reclassified it as Dimetrodon macrospondylus. D. macrospondylus is diagnosed by its elongate vertebrae which have small keels. Romer and Price suggested that it may have descended from D. natalis, though noted a lack of transitional forms and noted the alternative possibility that it was the product of a dispersal event. Romer and Price estimated its body mass at 83 kg (183 lb).

=== Dimetrodon dollovianus ===
Dimetrodon dollovianus was first described by Edward Drinker Cope in 1888 as Embolophorus dollovianus. In 1903, E. C. Case published a lengthy description of E. dollovianus, which he later referred to Dimetrodon. This taxon is known only from fragmentary remains, though is distinguished in part by its size: Romer and Price estimated its body mass at 147 kg (324 lb), regarding it as one of the larger species.

=== Dimetrodon grandis ===
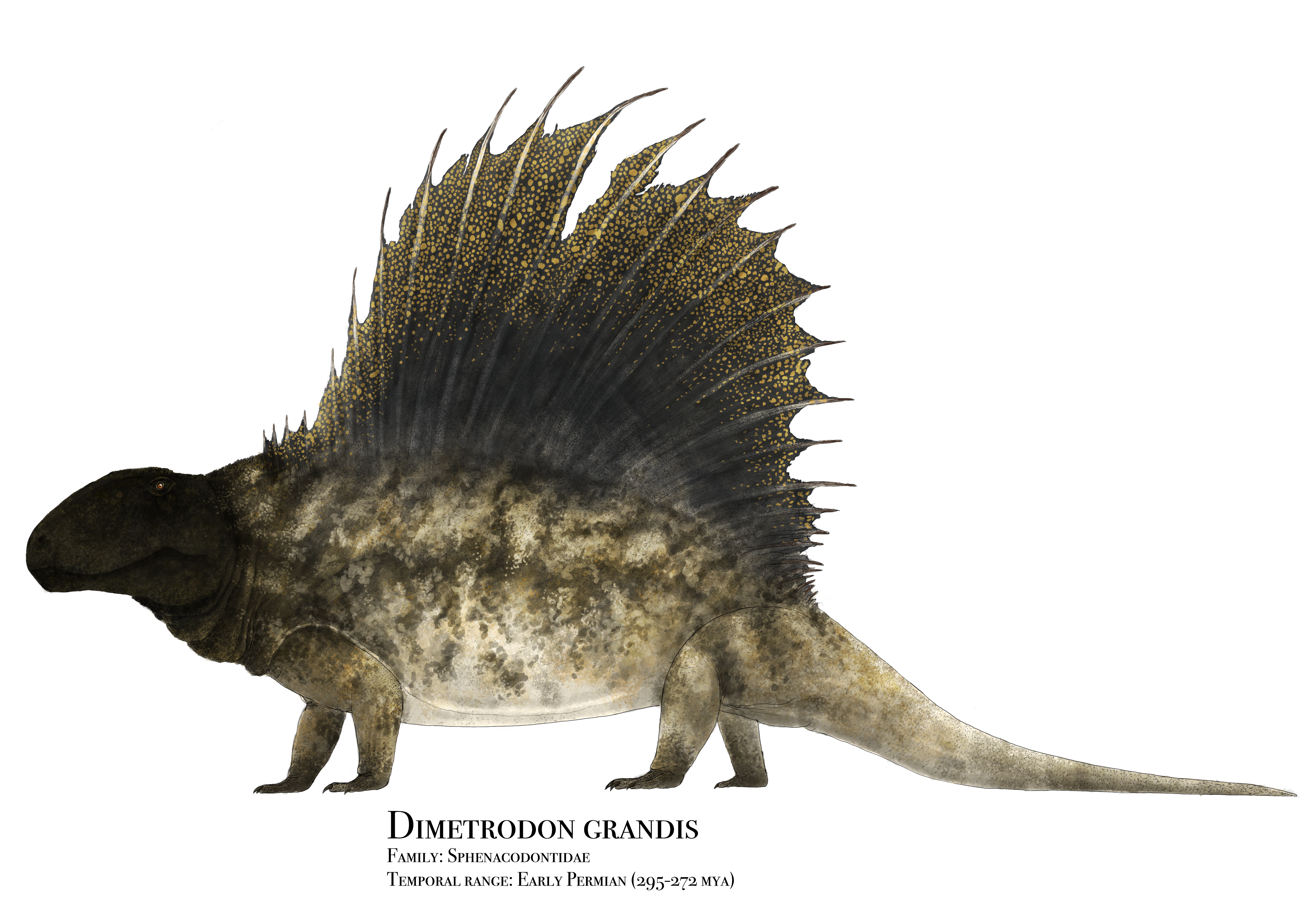
Restoration of Dimetrodon grandis

In his 1878 paper on fossils from Texas, Cope named Clepsydrops gigas along with the first named species of Dimetrodon (D. limbatus, D. incisivus, and D. rectiformis). Case reclassified C. gigas as a new species of Dimetrodon in 1907. Case also described a very well preserved skull of Dimetrodon in 1904, attributing it to the species Dimetrodon gigas. In 1919, Charles W. Gilmore attributed a nearly complete specimen of Dimetrodon to D. gigas. In 1907, Case named a new species of sail-backed synapsid, Theropleura grandis.

In 1940, Alfred Romer and Llewellyn Ivor Price reassigned Theropleura grandis to Dimetrodon, erecting the species D. grandis. Furthermore, they observed that the type specimen of "D. gigas", likely a pelvis, more closely resembled that of the temnospondyl amphibian Eryops and thus could not be assigned to Dimetrodon. As such, most D. gigas specimens were reassigned to D. grandis. This species is differentiated from other species by its skull, which is more elongate than any aside from D. limbatus, the large size of its caniniform teeth, and the morphology of its sail: it had elongated neural spines and the more posterior (rearward) ones curved backwards. Romer and Price estimated the body length of D. grandis at 319.5 cm (10.48 ft) and its body mass at 254 kg (560 lb), regarding it as the largest Dimetrodon species.

=== Dimetrodon giganhomogenes ===
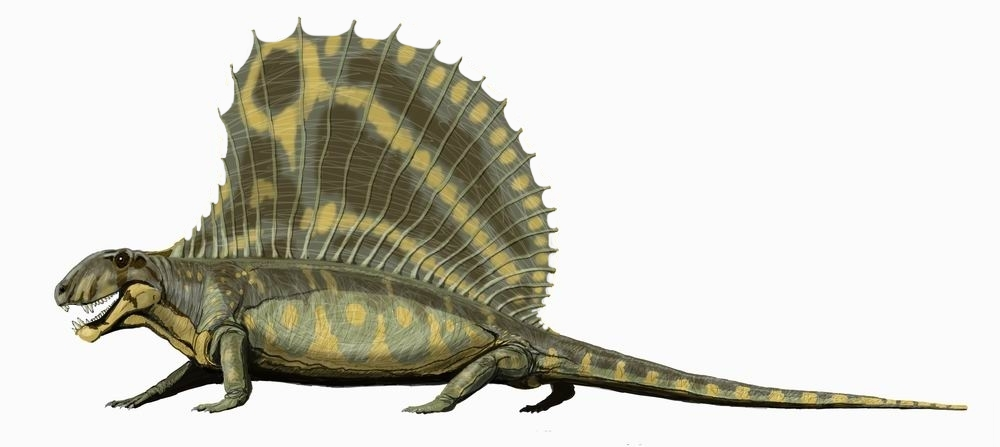
Restoration of Dimetrodon giganhomogenes

Dimetrodon giganhomogenes was named by E. C. Case in 1907. Romer and Price diagnosed D. giganhomogenes (which they referred to as D. "gigashomogenes") based on the marked rearward curve of its posterior neural spines and its massive lower jaw, and referred to it as "the peak in development of the long-bodied species of the genus". Romer and Price estimated the body length of D. giganhomogenes at 328 cm (10.76 ft) and its body mass at 166 kg (366 lb).

=== Dimetrodon booneorum ===
Dimetrodon booneorum was first described by Alfred Romer in 1937, along with D. kempae, D. loomisi, and D. milleri, on the basis of numerous fragmentary specimens from the upper Wichita Group of Texas. This taxon encompasses specimens with less elongated neural spines than D. milleri, which are considerably smaller than that species but larger than mature D. natalis specimens. Romer and Price estimated the body length of D. booneorum at 218.5 cm (7.17 ft) and its body mass at 63 kg (139 lb).

=== Dimetrodon loomisi ===
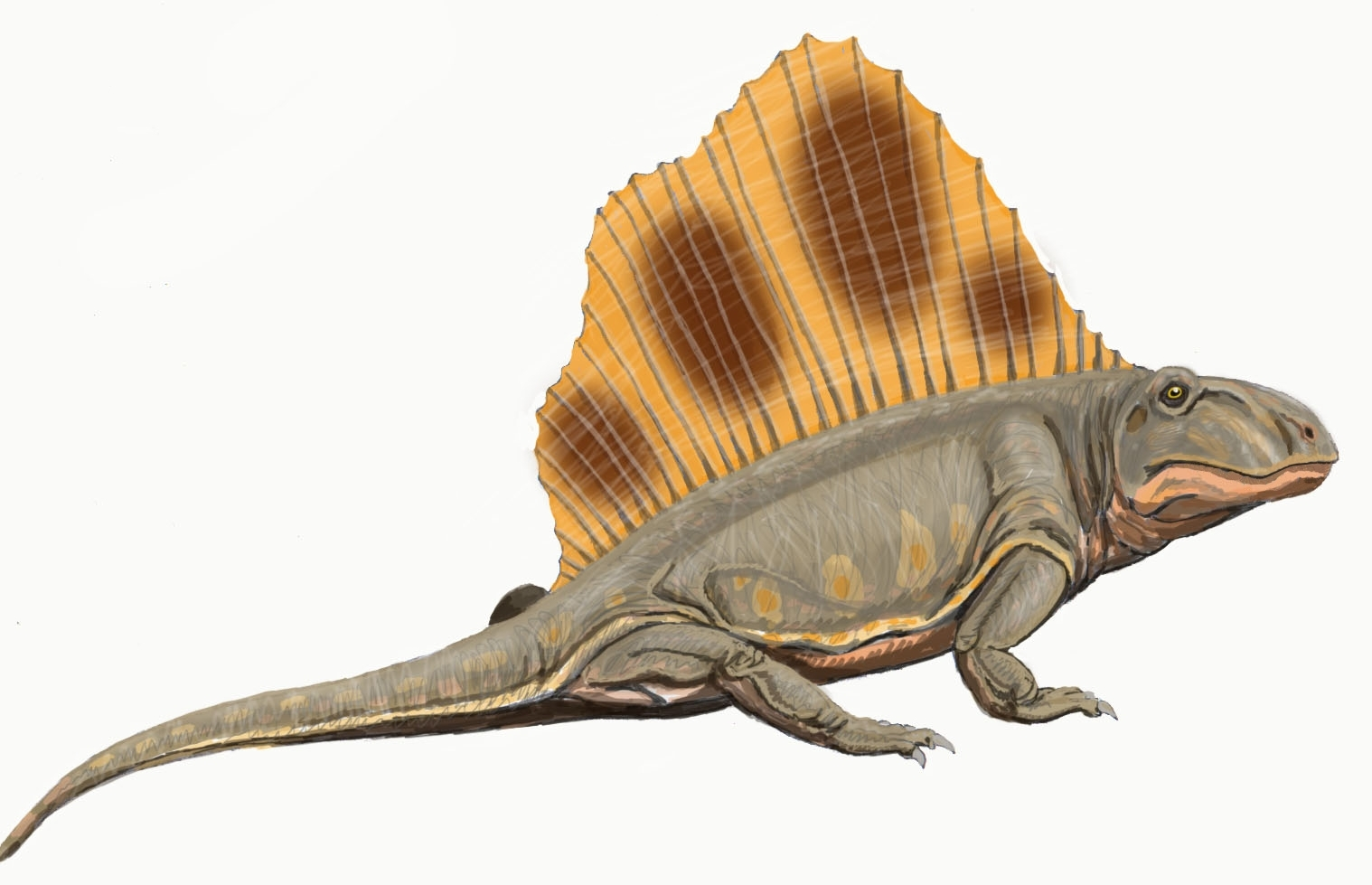
Restoration of Dimetrodon loomisi

Dimetrodon loomisi was first described by Alfred Romer in 1937. Remains have been found in Texas and Oklahoma. D. loomisi is similar to the contemporary D. gigashomogenes, though is distinguished by its straighter neural spines and its higher number of mandibular teeth. Occasional referrals to D. dollovianus were made Case and (tentatively) Romer, though in 1940 the latter disagreed with the synonymy, noting differences in size and temporal range. Romer and Price estimated the body length of D. loomisi at 256.5 cm (8.42 ft) and its body mass at 97 kg (214 lb).

=== Dimetrodon milleri ===
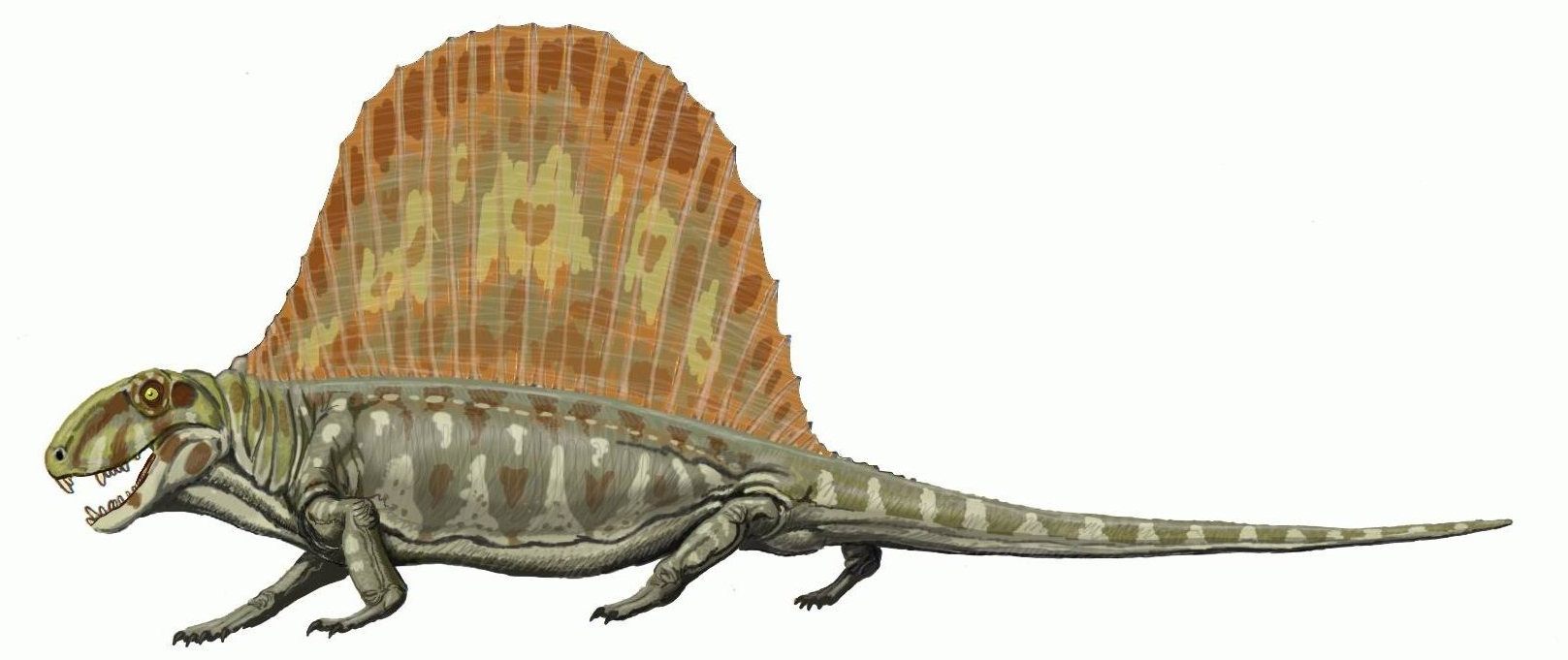
Restoration of Dimetrodon milleri

Dimetrodon milleri was described by Romer in 1937. It is one of the smallest species of Dimetrodon in North America. It may be closely related to D. occidentalis, another small-bodied species. D. milleri is known from two skeletons, one nearly complete (MCZ 1365) and another less complete but larger (MCZ 1367). D. milleri is the oldest known species of Dimetrodon.

Besides its small size, D. milleri differs from other species of Dimetrodon in that its neural spines are circular rather than figure-eight shaped in cross-section. Its vertebrae are also shorter in height relative to the rest of the skeleton than those of other Dimetrodon species. The skull is tall and the snout is short relative to the temporal region. A short vertebrae and tall skull are also seen in the species D. booneorum, D. limbatus and D. grandis, suggesting that D. milleri may be the first of an evolutionary progression between these species. Romer and Price provided two size estimates for D. milleri: the upper estimate given was a body length of 194.5 cm (6.38 ft) and its body mass at 70 kg (150 lb), whereas the type specimen, a presumed female, was estimated at 1.7 m (5.5 ft) and 47 kg (104 lb).

=== Dimetrodon angelensis ===
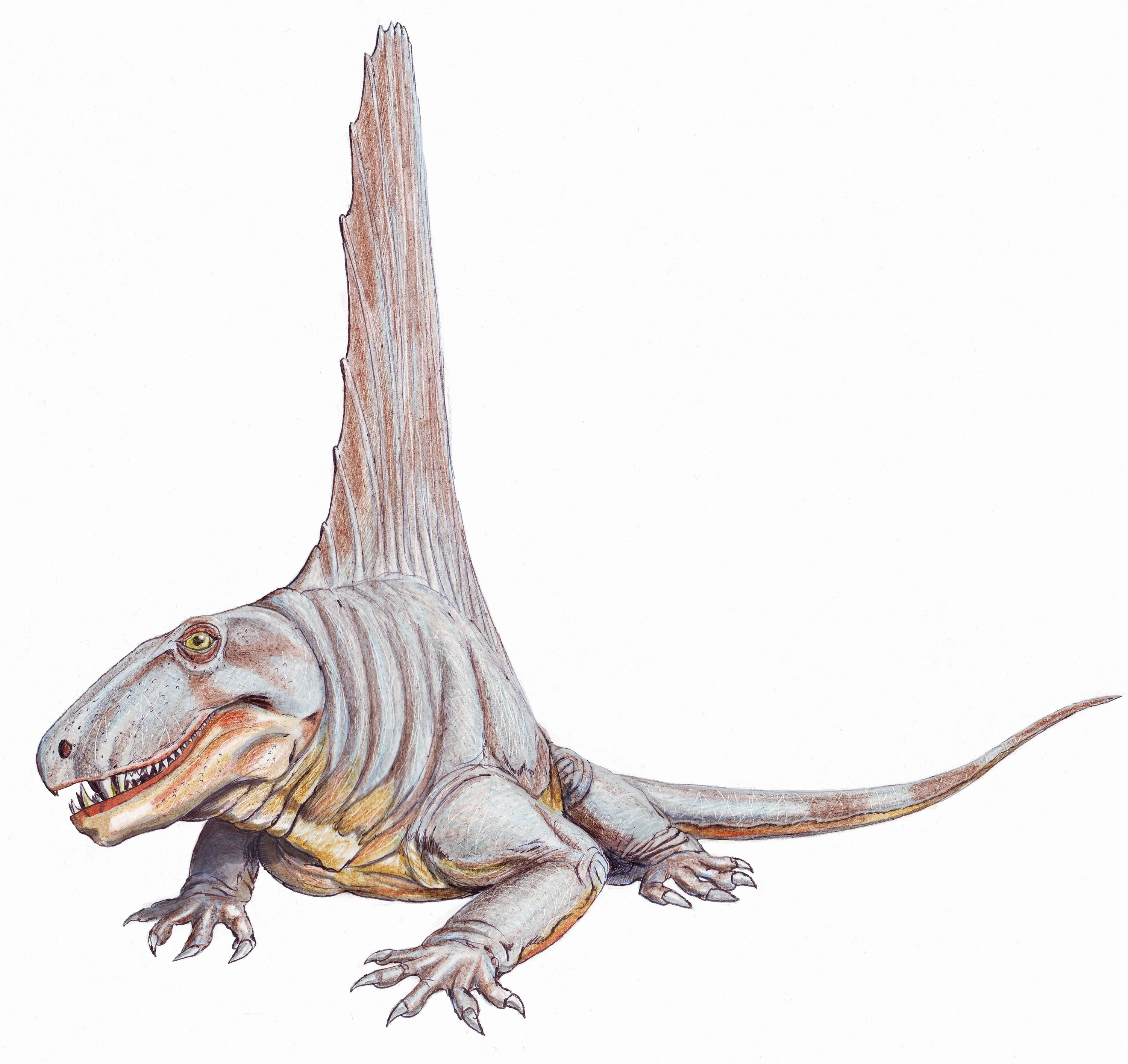
Restoration of Dimetrodon angelensis

Dimetrodon angelensis was named by paleontologist Everett C. Olson in 1962, based on a specimen from the upper San Angelo Formation of Texas. Several other specimens have also been reported from the same locality. D. angelensis is the largest species of Dimetrodon, being slightly larger than D. grandis and G. giganhomogenes. It had a relatively shallow skull and very long caniniform teeth, and its cervical (neck) vertebrae were elongated and lightweight.

=== Dimetrodon occidentalis ===
Dimetrodon occidentalis was named in 1977 from New Mexico. Its name means "western Dimetrodon" because it is the only North American species of Dimetrodon known west of Texas and Oklahoma. It was named on the basis of a single skeleton belonging to a relatively small individual. The small size of D. occidentalis is similar to that of D. milleri, suggesting a close relationship, though it could be distinguished by its possession of the usual "figure-eight" vertebrae. Dimetrodon specimens found in Utah and Arizona probably also belong to D. occidentalis.

=== Dimetrodon teutonis ===
Dimetrodon teutonis was named in 2001 from the Thuringian Forest of Germany and was the first species of Dimetrodon to be described outside North America. It is also the smallest, with an estimated body mass of 14 kg (31 lb). A larger specimen described later indicated a larger size of 24 kilograms (53 lb) in weight and 1 metre (3.3 ft) in length.

=== Dimetrodon borealis ===
Dimetrodon borealis was originally described by Leidy in 1854 as the lower jaw of a dinosaur under the name Bathygnathus borealis. A 2015 study reclassified the species into the genus Dimetrodon.

== Previously assigned species and synonyms ==
=== Dimetrodon incisivus ===
The first use of the name Dimetrodon came in 1878 when Cope named the species Dimetrodon incisivus along with Dimetrodon rectiformis and Dimetrodon gigas. However, since D. limbatus was named first (as Clepsydrops limbatus), it takes priority over D. incisivus, and is thus the true type species.

=== Dimetrodon rectiformis ===
Dimetrodon rectiformis was named alongside Dimetrodon incisivus in Cope's 1878 paper, and was the only one of the three named species to preserve elongated neural spines. In 1907, paleontologist E. C. Case moved D. rectiformis into the species D. incisivus. D. incisivus was later synonymous with the type species Dimetrodon limbatus, making D. rectiformis a synonym of D. limbatus.

=== Dimetrodon cruciger ===
In 1878, Cope published a paper called "The Theromorphous Reptilia" in which he described Dimetrodon cruciger. D. cruciger was distinguished by the small projections that extended from either side of each neural spine like the branches of a tree. In 1886, Cope moved D. cruciger to the genus Naosaurus because he considered its spines so different from those of other Dimetrodon species that the species deserved its own genus. Naosaurus would later be synonymized with Edaphosaurus, a genus which Cope named in 1882 on the basis of skulls that evidently belonged to herbivorous animals given their blunt crushing teeth.

=== Dimetrodon semiradicatus ===
Described in 1881 on the basis of upper jaw bones, Dimetrodon semiradicatus was the last species named by Cope. In 1907, E. C. Case synonymized D. semiradicatus with D. incisivus based on similarities in the shape of the teeth and skull bones. D. incisivus and D. semiradicatus are now considered synonyms of D. limbatus.

=== Dimetrodon longiramus ===
E. C. Case named the species Dimetrodon longiramus in 1907 on the basis of a scapula and elongated mandible from the Belle Plains Formation of Texas. In 1936, Romer recognized that the "D. longiramus" material belonged to the same taxon as another specimen described by paleontologist Samuel Wendell Williston in 1916, which included a similarly elongated mandible and a long maxilla. Williston did not consider his specimen to belong to Dimetrodon but instead classified it as an ophiacodontid. Romer, therefore, assigned both Case and Williston's specimens to a new genus and species, Secodontosaurus longiramus, that was closely related to Dimetrodon.

=== Dimetrodon platycentrus ===
Dimetrodon platycentrus was first described by Case in his 1907 monograph based on a set of disarticulated neural spines. Romer and Price considered it a synonym of D. macrospondylus, though noted similarities with D. dollovianus.

=== "Dimetrodon" kempae ===
Dimetrodon kempae was named by Romer in 1937, in the same paper as D. booneorum, D. loomisi, and D. milleri. Dimetrodon kempae was named on the basis of a single humerus and a few vertebrae, and may therefore be a nomen dubium that cannot be distinguished as a unique species of Dimetrodon. In 1940, Romer and Price raised the possibility that D. kempae may not fall within the genus Dimetrodon, drawing comparisons with Varanops. Subsequent authors have placed D. kempae as Sphenacodontinae incertae sedis.
