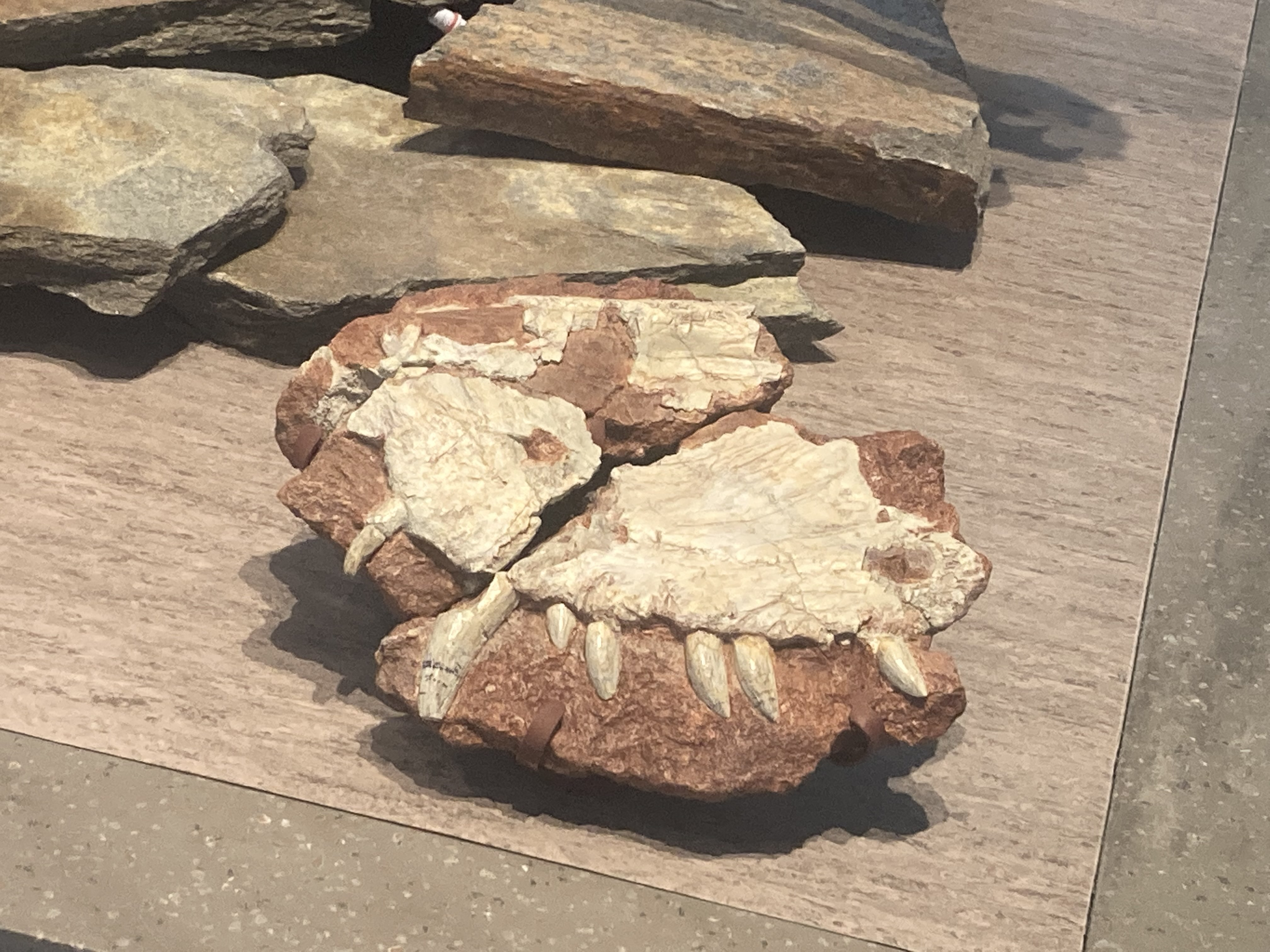
- Holotype jaw of D. borealis displayed at the Royal Ontario Museum

Scientific classification
- Domain: Eukaryota
- Kingdom: Animalia
- Phylum: Chordata
- Clade: Synapsida
- Family: †Sphenacodontidae
- Genus: †Dimetrodon
- Species: †D. borealis

Binomial name
- †Dimetrodon borealis Leidy, 1854

Synonyms
- Bathygnathus borealis Leidy, 1854

= Dimetrodon borealis =

Dimetrodon borealis Temporal range: Middle Permian, 270 Ma

Extinct species of synapsid

Dimetrodon borealis, formerly known as Bathygnathus borealis, is an extinct species of pelycosaur-grade synapsid that lived about 270 million years ago, during the Early Middle Permian period. A partial maxilla or upper jaw bone from Prince Edward Island in Canada is the only known fossil, which was discovered around 1845 during the course of a well excavation in Spring Brook in the New London area and its significance was recognized by geologists John William Dawson and Joseph Leidy. It was originally described by Leidy in 1854 as the lower jaw of a dinosaur, making it the first purported dinosaur to have been found in Canada, and the second to have been found in all of North America (the first was Clepsysaurus from Pennsylvania, now known to be a phytosaur rather than a dinosaur). The bone was later identified as that of a sphenacodontid pelycosaur, specifically a species of Dimetrodon.

== Description ==
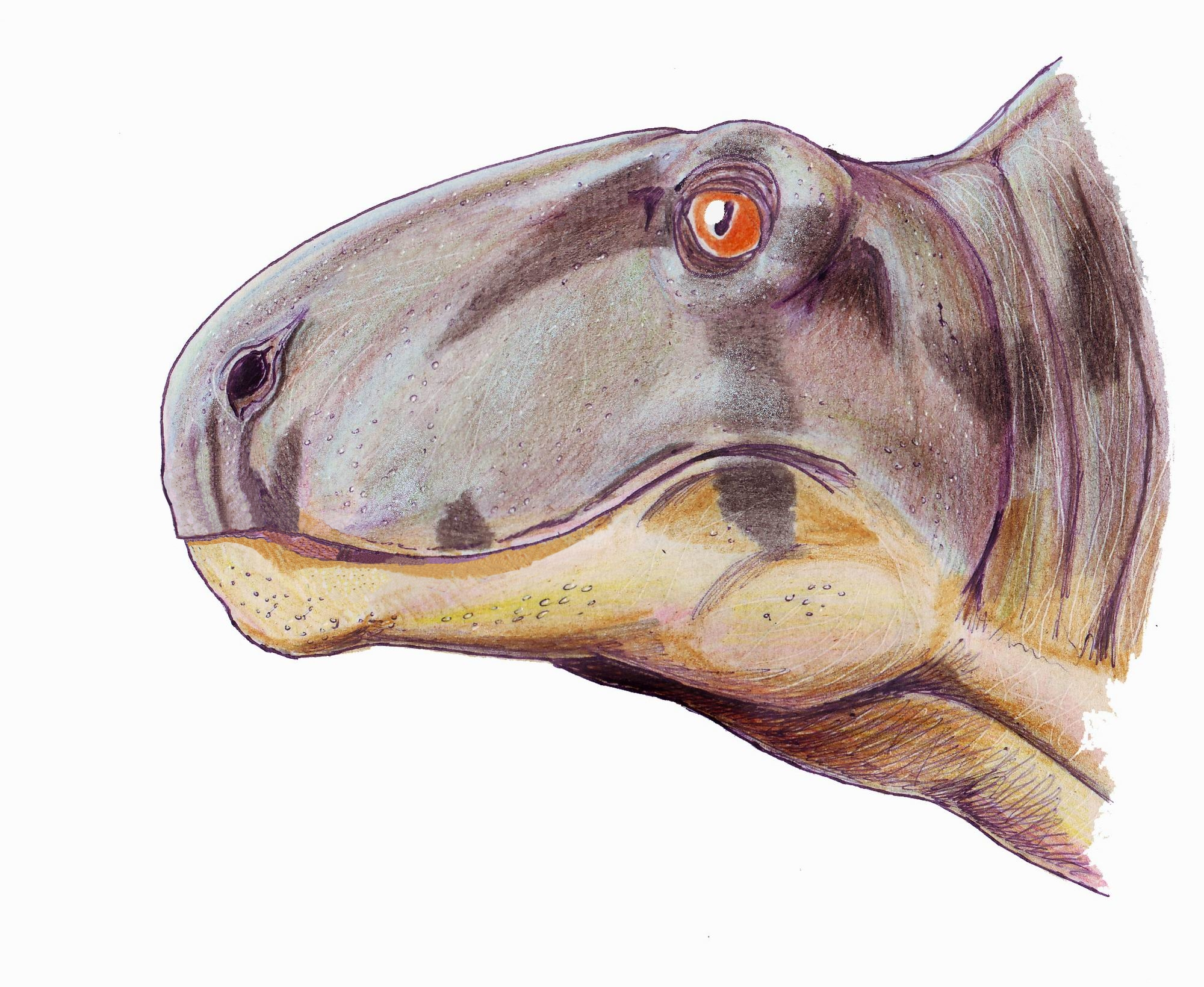
Speculative restoration of the head of D. borealis

The teeth of Dimetrodon borealis are long, recurved, and distinctively teardrop-shaped, being widest at the middle rather than the base. The teardrop shape of the teeth is an indication that Dimetrodon borealis belongs to the family Sphenacodontidae. The shape of the maxilla indicates that Dimetrodon borealis had a deep skull like those of other advanced sphenacodontids like Dimetrodon. Like most other species of Dimetrodon, Dimetrodon borealis has an enlarged caniniform tooth near the front of the jaw.

== History of study ==
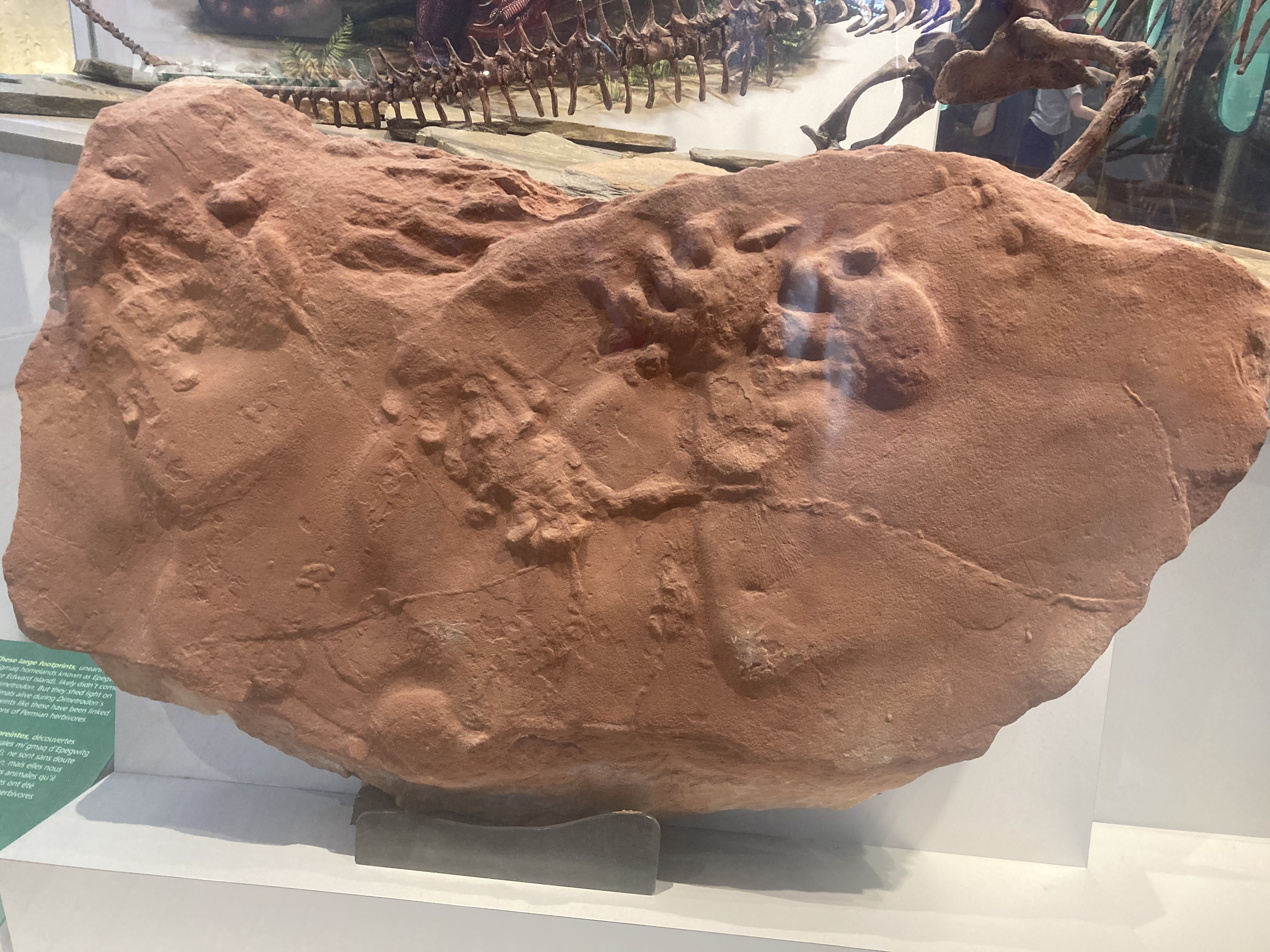
Tracks of Dimetrodon or a similar animal found on Prince Edward Island

The maxilla of Bathygnathus was found around 1845 in a community in the north of Prince Edward Island called French River. The bone was uncovered by a landowner named Donald McLeod in a layer of shale at the bottom of his well. This layer was part of a red sandstone formation that bears similarities to younger Triassic sandstones in the United Kingdom, leading geologists to think that the deposit dated back to the Triassic rather than the Permian. Canadian geologist John William Dawson purchased the fossil and was the first to recognize its significance. Dawson brought it to the attention of American paleontologist Joseph Leidy, who described it to the Philadelphia Academy of Natural Sciences in 1854. Leidy identified the bone as a lower jaw, a mistake that was not corrected until English paleontologist Richard Owen reinterpreted it as an upper jaw in 1876. Leidy erected the new genus and species Bathygnathus borealis, which means "northern deep jaw" in Greek as a reference to the height of the jaw and its discovery in Canada. He identified it as belonging to a dinosaur, although he never called Bathygnathus a dinosaur in the paper (Dawson later described it as "a carnivorous reptile... one of that giant reptile aristocracy which constituted the highest animal type in the middle or secondary period of geologic time"). Leidy compared Bathygnathus with Thecodontosaurus from the Triassic red beds of the United Kingdom, one of the first dinosaurs to have been described scientifically.

Dawson inferred that Bathygnathus was a fast-moving carnivore, reasoning that its deep skull was similar to the short skulls of fast-moving snakes and unlike the long skulls of slow-moving crocodilians. Local naturalist Francis Bain popularized the image of Bathygnathus as a dinosaur in the late 1800s, describing it as a "deep jawed monster" that could attack prey "with a bound of sixteen or eighteen feet... bearing it to the ground with its great weight, while the powerful claws prevented its escape, and the sabre-armed jaws completed the sanguinary work of destruction."

American paleontologist E. C. Case reclassified Bathygnathus as a pelycosaur (a type of "mammal-like reptile") in 1905, noting its similarities with the genus Dimetrodon, a sail-backed synapsid that was discovered in Texas in the 1870s. In their 1940 overview of pelycosaurs, Alfred Romer and Llewellyn Ivor Price suggested that Bathygnathus might be synonymous with Dimetrodon.

Although its current classification as a sphenacodontid synapsid was not recognized until after the discovery of its more famous relative Dimetrodon in the 1870s, Bathygnathus is notable for being the first discovered sphenacodontid. A 2015 study by the researchers from the University of Toronto Mississauga, Carleton University and the Royal Ontario Museum reclassified the species into the genus Dimetrodon. Although Bathygnathus was named first, a petition to conserve the genus Dimetrodon and suppress the genus Bathygnathus was submitted to the International Commission on Zoological Nomenclature (ICZN) in 2015, which was approved in 2019.
