= Francis Bain =

Francis Bain (February 25, 1842 – November 20, 1894) was an author, scientist and farmer from North River, Prince Edward Island.

In 1865, in his time away from managing his family farm, he began a career as an amateur naturalist, collecting and cataloging the flora, fauna, and seashells of the island. He was especially interested in geology, and became an expert on the bedrock and fossils of PEI. In an 1882 study, he proposed that it would be possible to dig a tunnel under the Northumberland Strait, which would have enabled the federal government to honour its commitment made when PEI entered Confederation, that constant communication with the mainland be provided. He would later be hired by the federal government to do a more in-depth investigation of the idea, although it was never carried out.

Following Sir William Dawson's geological report of 1871, Bain continued the quest to explore the Island's rocks for fossils. Bain added to the record of fossil plants in particular. One of his discoveries was named by Sir William in his honour: Tylodendron baini. Bain wrote enthusiastically on natural history in a column in the Daily Examiner, as well as publishing many papers in scholarly journals. He authored two books The natural history of Prince Edward Island (1890) and Birds of Prince Edward Island (1891).

A monument in his honour is located in Queens Square in Charlottetown, incorporating a glacial erratic hauled to the site.
