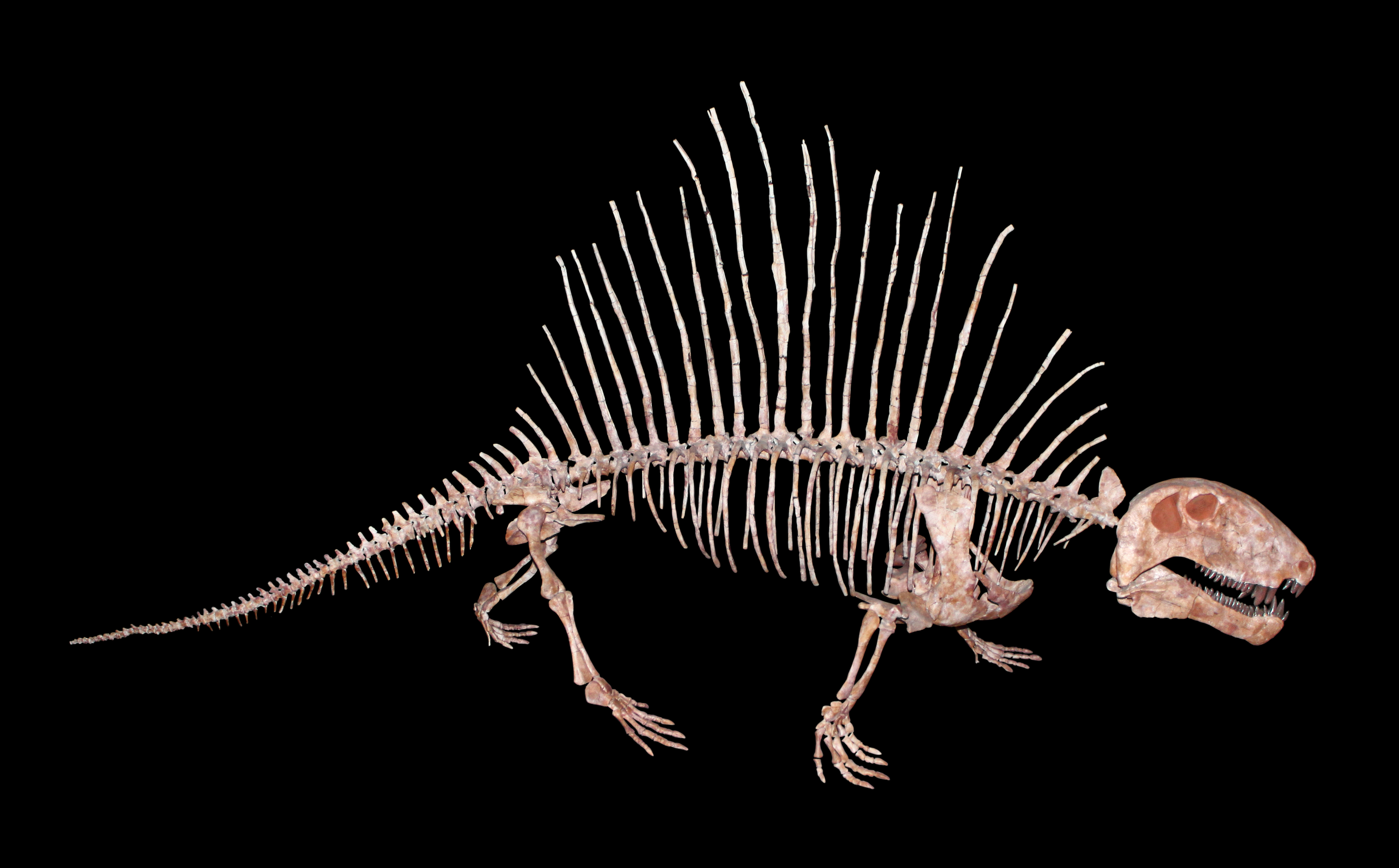
- Skeleton of D. limbatus, Staatliches Museum für Naturkunde Karlsruhe

Scientific classification
- Kingdom: Animalia
- Phylum: Chordata
- Clade: Synapsida
- Family: †Sphenacodontidae
- Subfamily: †Sphenacodontinae
- Genus: †Dimetrodon; Cope, 1878 (conserved name)

Type species
- †Dimetrodon limbatus Cope, 1877

Species
- List of species: †D. angelensis Olson, 1962; †D. booneorum Romer, 1937; †D. borealis (Leidy, 1854) Brink, Maddin, Evans, & Reisz, 2015; †D. dollovianus (Cope, 1888) Case, 1907; †D. giganhomogenes Case, 1907; †D. grandis (Case, 1907) Romer and Price, 1940; †D. limbatus (Cope, 1877) Romer and Price, 1940; †D. loomisi Romer, 1937; †D. macrospondylus (Cope, 1884) Case, 1907; †D. milleri Romer, 1937; †D. natalis (Cope, 1878) Romer, 1936; †D. occidentalis Berman, 1977; †D. teutonis Berman, Reisz, Martens, & Henrici, 2001

Synonyms
- Genus synonymy: Bathygnathus Leidy, 1854; Embolophorus Cope, 1878; Theropleura Cope, 1880; Bathyglyptus Case, 1911; Eosyodon Olson, 1962; Species synonymy: Bathygnathus borealis Leidy, 1854; Clepsydrops limbatus Cope, 1877; Clepsydrops gigas Cope, 1878; Clepsydrops natalis Cope, 1878; Dimetrodon gigas Cope, 1878; Dimetrodon incisivus Cope, 1878; Dimetrodon rectiformis Cope, 1878; Embolophorus dollovianus Cope, 1878; Dimetrodon semiradicatus Cope, 1881; Clepsydrops macrospondylus Cope 1884; Dimetrodon platycentrus Case, 1907; Theropleura grandis Case, 1907; Bathyglyptus theodori Case, 1911; Dimetrodon maximus Romer, 1936; Eosyodon hudsoni Olson, 1962

= Dimetrodon =

Dimetrodon Temporal range: Permian, Cisuralian (Asselian)–Guadalupian (Roadian), 294.1–271 Ma

Genus of carnivorous synapsids from the Permian

Dimetrodon (/daɪˈmiːtrəˌdɒn/ or /daɪˈmɛtrəˌdɒn/; lit. 'two measures of teeth') is an extinct genus of sphenacodontid synapsids that lived during the Cisuralian to early Guadalupian epoch of the Permian period, around 294.1–271 million years ago. With most species measuring 1.7–4.6 m (5.6–15.1 ft) long and weighing 28–250 kg (62–551 lb), the most prominent feature of Dimetrodon is the large neural spine sail on its back formed by elongated spines extending from the vertebrae. It was an obligate quadruped (it could walk only on four legs) and had a tall, curved skull, with large teeth of different sizes set along the jaws. Most fossils have been found in the Southwestern United States, the majority of these coming from a geological deposit called the Red Beds of Texas and Oklahoma. More recently, its fossils have also been found in Germany, and over a dozen species have been named since the genus was first erected in 1878.

Dimetrodon is often mistaken for a dinosaur or portrayed as a contemporary of dinosaurs in popular culture, but it became extinct by the middle Permian, some 40 million years before the appearance of dinosaurs. Although reptile-like in appearance and physiology, Dimetrodon is much more closely related to mammals, as it belongs to the closest sister family to therapsids, the latter of which contains the direct ancestor of mammals. Dimetrodon is traditionally assigned to the paraphyletic group "pelycosaurs", a term now considered obsolete and replaced by terms such as "primitive synapsids" or "basal synapsids"; the name "mammal-like reptiles" is also traditionally used for nonmammalian synapsids due to some of the features shared with modern mammals such as tooth specialization and endothermy, but that term is now also defunct. The Dimetrodon skull has a single opening (temporal fenestra) behind each eye, a feature shared among all synapsids, unlike the skulls of reptiles and birds, both of which belong to the clade Sauropsida, which had diverged from the synapsids by the Late Carboniferous.

Dimetrodon was probably one of the apex predators of the Cisuralian ecosystems, feeding on fish and tetrapods, including reptiles and amphibians. Smaller Dimetrodon species may have had different ecological roles. The sail of Dimetrodon may have been used to stabilize its spine or to heat and cool its body as a form of thermoregulation. Some recent studies argue that the sail would have been ineffective at removing heat from the body, due to large species being discovered with small sails and small species being discovered with large sails, essentially ruling out heat regulation as its main purpose. The sail was most likely used in courtship display, including threatening away rivals or showing off to potential mates.

== History of discovery ==
=== Earliest discoveries ===
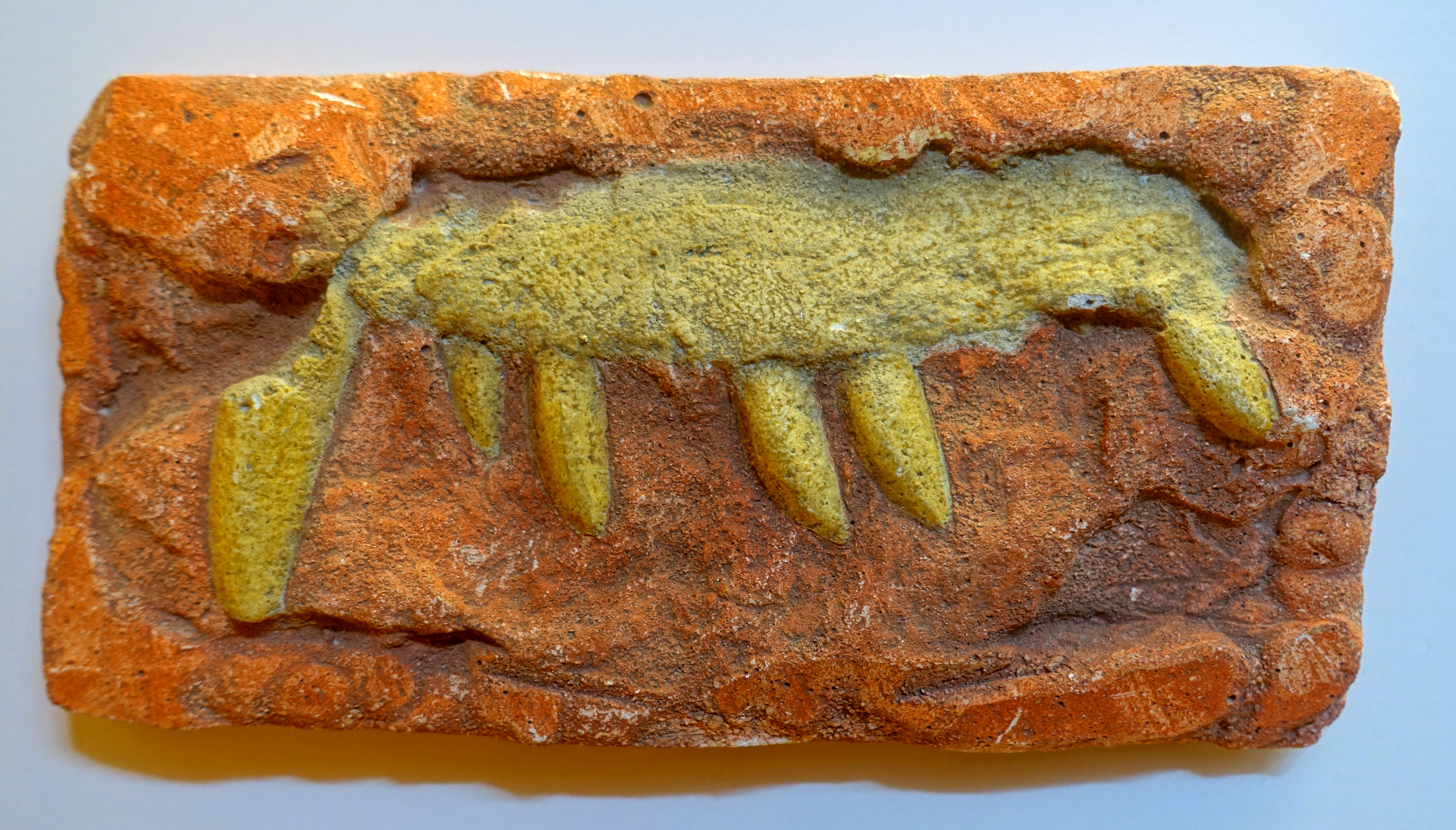
Maxilla of Dimetrodon borealis, the first Dimetrodon fossil to be described

The earliest known Dimetrodon fossil was a maxilla discovered in 1845 by Donald McLeod, a resident of the British colony of Prince Edward Island (now part of Canada). The specimen was purchased by Canadian geologist John William Johnson and described by Joseph Leidy in 1854 as the mandible of Bathygnathus borealis, a large carnivore thought to be related to Thecodontosaurus. In 2015, it was reclassified as Dimetrodon borealis. Although Bathygnathus had been named first, a petition to conserve the genus name Dimetrodon and suppress the earlier was submitted to the International Commission on Zoological Nomenclature (ICZN) in 2015 and approved in 2019.

=== First descriptions by Cope ===
Fossils now assigned to Dimetrodon were first studied by American paleontologist Edward Drinker Cope in the 1870s. Cope acquired the specimens, along with those of numerous other Permian tetrapods, from collectors exploring the Red Beds of Texas. These included Swiss naturalist Jacob Boll, Texas geologist W. F. Cummins, and amateur paleontologist Charles Hazelius Sternberg. Most of Cope's specimens were sent to the American Museum of Natural History or to the Walker Museum at the University of Chicago. Most of the Walker Museum's fossil collection is now housed at the Field Museum of Natural History.

Sternberg sent some of his specimens to German paleontologist Ferdinand Broili at Ludwig-Maximilians-Universität München, although Broili was not as prolific in describing specimens as Cope. Cope's rival, Othniel Charles Marsh, also collected Dimetrodon remains and sent them to the Walker Museum. The genus name Dimetrodon was first introduced in 1878, when Cope described three species–D. incisivus, D. rectiformis, and D. gigas–in the scientific journal Proceedings of the American Philosophical Society.

The first description of a Dimetrodon fossil came a year earlier, though, when Cope named the species Clepsydrops limbatus from the Texas Red Beds. (The name Clepsydrops was first coined by Cope in 1875 for sphenacodontid remains from Vermilion County, Illinois, and was later employed for many sphenacontid specimens from Texas; many new species of sphenacodontids from Texas were assigned to either Clepsydrops or Dimetrodon in the late 19th and early 20th centuries.) C. limbatus was reclassified as a species of Dimetrodon in 1940, meaning that Cope's 1877 paper was the first record of Dimetrodon.

Cope was the first to describe a sail-backed synapsid with the naming of C. natalis in his 1878 paper, although he called the sail a fin and compared it to the crests of the modern basilisk lizard (Basilicus). Sails were not preserved in the specimens of D. incisive and D. gigas that Cope described in his 1878 paper, but elongated spines were present in the D. rectiformis specimen he described. Cope commented on the purpose of the sail in 1886, writing, "The utility is difficult to imagine. Unless the animal had aquatic habits and swam on its back, the crest or fin must have been in the way of active movements... The limbs are not long enough nor the claws acute enough to demonstrate arboreal habits, as in the existing genus Basilicus, where a similar crest exists."

=== Early 20th century descriptions ===
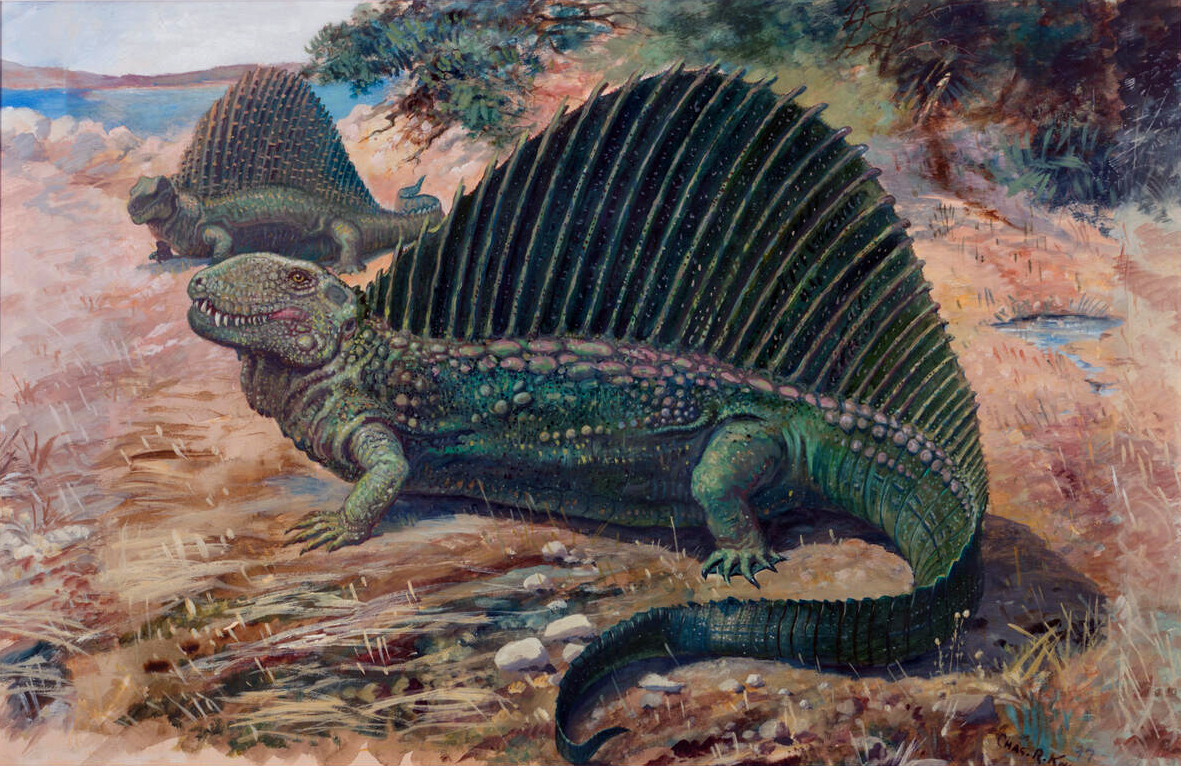
Restoration of Dimetrodon and Edaphosaurus (background), Charles R. Knight, 1897

In the first few decades of the 20th century, American paleontologists E. C. Case authored many studies on Dimetrodon and described several new species. He received funding from the Carnegie Institution for his study of many Dimetrodon specimens in the collections of the American Museum of Natural History and several other museums. Many of these fossils had been collected by Cope but had not been thoroughly described, as Cope was known for erecting new species on the basis of only a few bone fragments.

Beginning in the late 1920s, paleontologist Alfred Romer restudied many Dimetrodon specimens and named several new species. In 1940, Romer coauthored a large study with Llewellyn Ivor Price called "Review of the Pelycosauria" in which the species of Dimetrodon named by Cope and Case were reassessed. Most of the species names considered valid by Romer and Price are still used today.

=== New specimens ===
In the decades following Romer and Price's monograph, many Dimetrodon specimens were described from localities outside Texas and Oklahoma. The first was described from the Four Corners region of Utah in 1966 and another was described from Arizona in 1969. In 1975, Olson reported Dimetrodon material from the Washington Formation of Ohio, which has been given a tentative assignment of D. cf. limbatus. A new species of Dimetrodon called D. occidentalis (meaning "western Dimetrodon") was named in 1977 from New Mexico. The specimens found in Utah and Arizona probably also belong to D. occidentalis.

Before these discoveries, a theory existed that a midcontinental seaway separated what is now Texas and Oklahoma from more western lands during the Early Permian, isolating Dimetrodon to a small region of North America, while a smaller sphenacodontid called Sphenacodon dominated the western area. While this seaway probably did exist, the discovery of fossils outside Texas and Oklahoma show that its extent was limited and that it was not an effective barrier to the distribution of Dimetrodon.

In 2001, a new species of Dimetrodon called D. teutonis was described from the Lower Permian Bromacker locality at the Thuringian Forest of Germany, extending the geographic range of Dimetrodon outside North America for the first time.

== Description ==
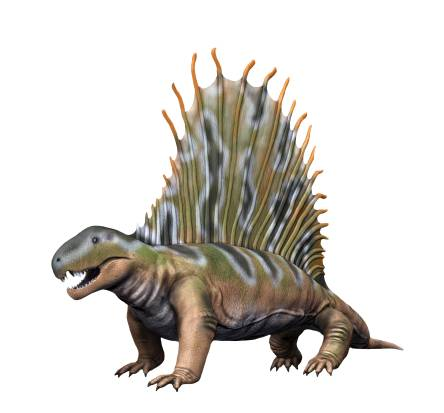
Restoration of D. giganhomogenes with exposed neural spine tips

Dimetrodon was a quadrupedal, sail-backed synapsid that most likely had a semi-sprawling posture between that of a mammal and a lizard and also could walk in a more upright stance with its body and the majority or all of its tail off the ground. Most Dimetrodon species ranged in length from 1.7 to 5 m (6 to 16 ft), and are estimated to have weighed between 28 and 250 kg (60 and 550 lb). The smallest known species, D. teutonis, was about 60 cm (24 in) long and weighed 14 kg (31 lb). The larger species of Dimetrodon were among the largest predators of the Early Permian, with D. grandis measuring 3.2 m (10.5 ft) and weighing some 250 kg (550 lb); D. limbatus is estimated at 2.7 to 3 m (8.9 to 9.8 ft) and some 100 kg (220 lb). The closely related Tappenosaurus, known from skeletal fragments in slightly younger rocks, may have been even larger at an estimated 5.5 metres (18 ft) long.

=== Skull ===
The skull of Dimetrodon is tall and compressed laterally, or side-to-side. The eye sockets are positioned high and far back in the skull. Behind each eye socket on each side is a single hole called an infratemporal fenestra. An additional hole in the skull, the pineal foramen (or "third eye") along the midline between the parietal bones, can be seen when viewed from above. The back of the skull (the occiput) is oriented at a slight upward angle, a feature that it shares with all other early synapsids. The upper margin of the skull slopes downward in a convex arc to the tip of the snout. The tip of the upper jaw, formed by the premaxilla bone, is raised above the part of the jaw formed by the maxilla bone to form a maxillary "step". Within this step is a diastema, a gap in the tooth row.

A single large opening on either side of the back of the skull links Dimetrodon to mammals and distinguishes it from most of the earliest sauropsids, which either lack openings or have two openings. Features such as ridges on the inside of the nasal cavity and a ridge at the back of the lower jaw are thought to be part of an evolutionary progression from early four-limbed land-dwelling vertebrates to mammals. On the inner surface of the nasal section of the skull are ridges called nasoturbinals, which may have supported cartilage that increased the area of the olfactory epithelium, the layer of tissue that detects odors. These ridges are much smaller than those of later synapsids from the Late Permian and Triassic, whose large nasoturbinals are taken as evidence for warm-bloodedness because they may have supported mucous membranes that warmed and moistened incoming air. Thus, the nasal cavity of Dimetrodon is transitional between those of early land vertebrates and mammals. Another transitional feature of Dimetrodon is a ridge in the back of the jaw called the reflected lamina, which is found on the articular bone, which connects to the quadrate bone of the skull to form the jaw joint. In later mammal ancestors, the articular and quadrate separated from the jaw joint, while the articular developed into the malleus bone of the middle ear. The reflected lamina became part of a ring called the tympanic annulus that supports the ear drum in all living mammals.

==== Teeth ====
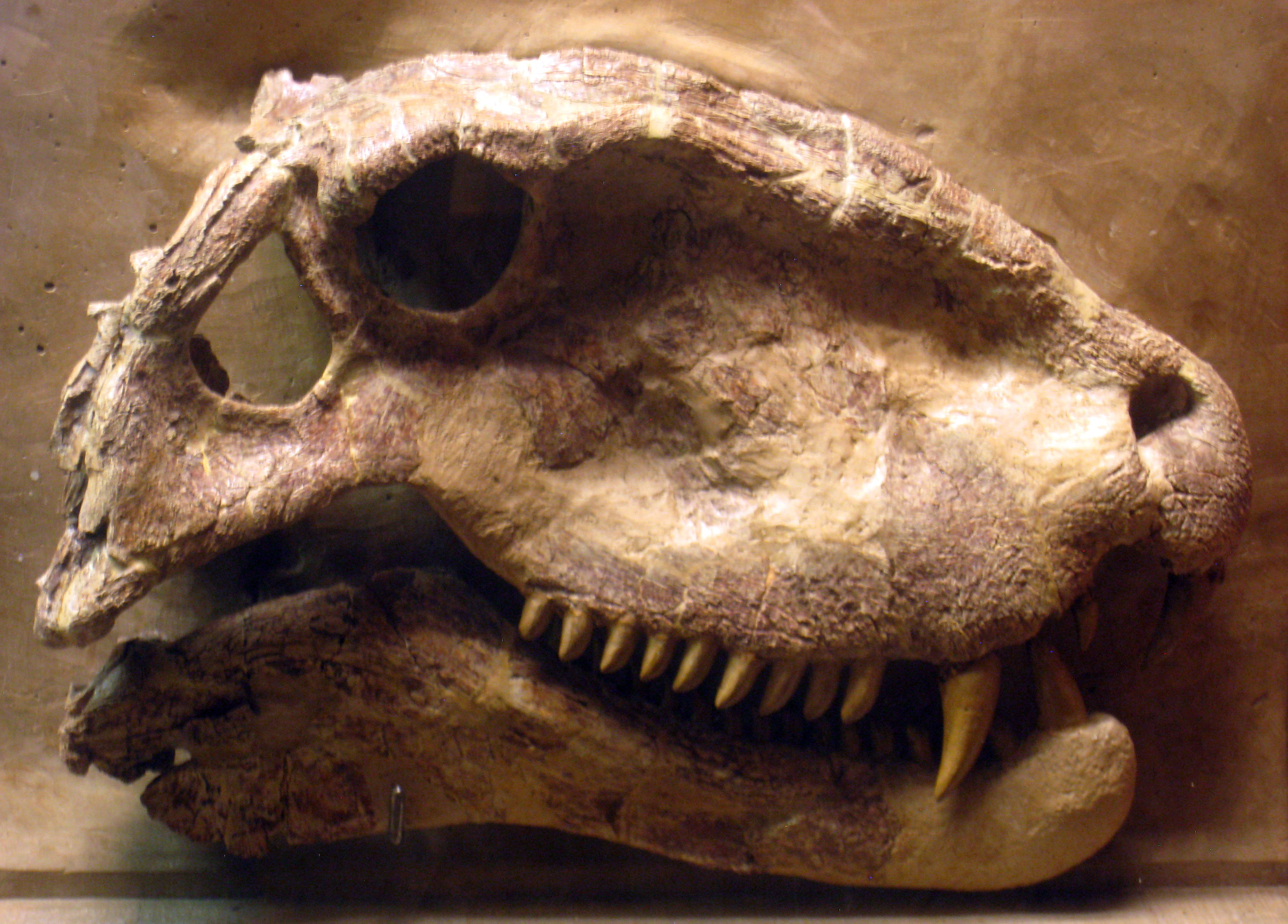
A skull of D. grandis

The size of the teeth varies greatly along the length of the jaws, lending Dimetrodon its name, which means "two measures of tooth" in reference to sets of small and large teeth. One or two pairs of caniniforms (large, pointed, canine-like teeth) extend from the maxilla. Large incisor teeth are also present at the tips of the upper and lower jaws, rooted in the premaxillae and dentary bones. Small teeth are present around the maxillary "step" and behind the caniforms, becoming smaller further back in the jaw. On the roof of the mouth, towards the back, the pterygoid bones each bear a large flange which supports a row of palatal teeth.

Many teeth are widest at their midsections and narrow closer to the jaws, giving them the appearance of a teardrop. Teardrop-shaped teeth are unique to Dimetrodon and other closely related sphenacodontids, which helps to distinguish them from other early synapsids. As in many other early synapsids, the teeth of most Dimetrodon species are serrated at their edges. The serrations of Dimetrodon teeth were so fine that they resembled tiny cracks. The dinosaur Albertosaurus had similarly crack-like serrations, but, at the base of each serration was a round void, which would have functioned to distribute force over a larger surface area and prevent the stresses of feeding from causing the crack to spread through the tooth. Unlike Albertosaurus, Dimetrodon teeth lacked adaptations that would stop cracks from forming at their serrations. The teeth of D. teutonis lack serrations, but still have sharp edges.

A 2014 study shows that Dimetrodon was in an arms race against its prey. The smaller species, D. milleri, had no tooth serrations because it ate small prey. As prey grew larger, several Dimetrodon species started developing serrations on their teeth and increasing in size. For instance, D. limbatus had enamel serrations that helped it cut through flesh (which were similar to the serrations that can be found on Secodontosaurus). The second-largest species, D. grandis, has denticle serrations similar to those of sharks and theropod dinosaurs, making its teeth even more specialized for slicing through flesh. As Dimetrodon's prey grew larger, the various species responded by growing to larger sizes and developing ever-sharper teeth. The thickness and mass of the teeth of Dimetrodon may also have been an adaptation for increasing dental longevity.

=== Sail ===
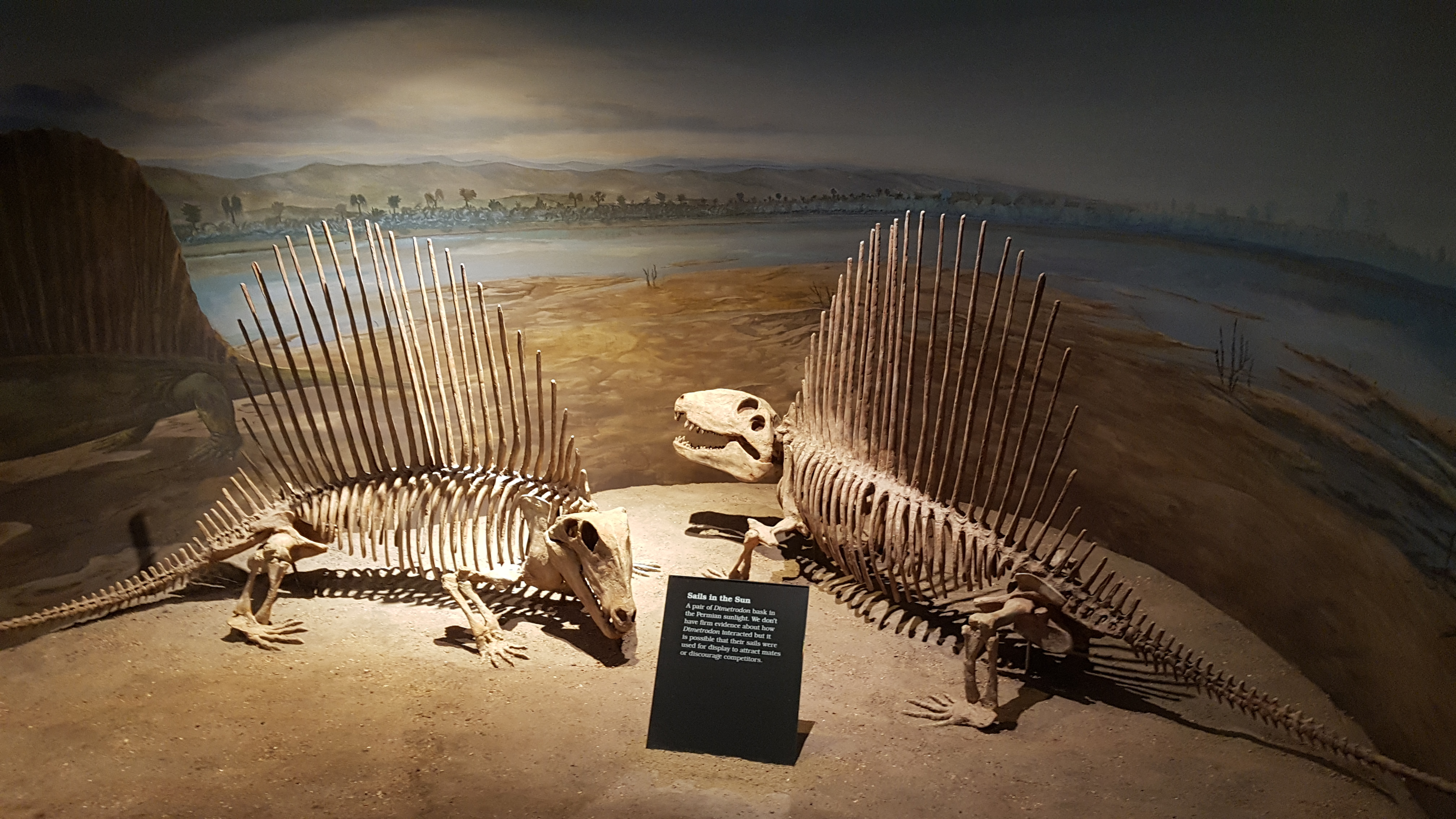
Two D. grandis skeletons, Royal Tyrrell Museum

The sail of Dimetrodon is formed by elongated neural spines projecting from the vertebrae. Each spine varies in cross-sectional shape from its base to its tip in what is known as "dimetrodont" differentiation. Near the vertebra body, the spine cross section is laterally compressed into a rectangular shape and, closer to the tip, it takes on a figure-eight shape as a groove runs along either side of the spine. The figure-eight shape is thought to reinforce the spine, preventing bending and fractures. A cross-section of the spine of one specimen of Dimetrodon giganhomogenes is rectangular in shape but preserves figure-eight shaped rings close to its center, indicating that the shape of spines may change as individuals age. The microscopic anatomy of each spine varies from base to tip, indicating where it was embedded in the muscles of the back and where it was exposed as part of a sail. The lower or proximal portion of the spine has a rough surface that would have served as an anchoring point for the epaxial muscles of the back and also has a network of connective tissues called Sharpey's fibers that indicate it was embedded within the body. Higher up on the distal (outer) portion of the spine, the bone surface is smoother. The periosteum, a layer of tissue surrounding the bone, is covered in small grooves that presumably supported the blood vessels that vascularized the sail.

The large groove that runs the length of the spine was once thought to be a channel for blood vessels, but since the bone does not contain vascular canals, the sail is not thought to have been as highly vascularized as once thought. Some specimens of Dimetrodon preserve deformed areas of the neural spines that appear to be healed-over fractures. The cortical bone that grew over these breaks is highly vascularized, suggesting that soft tissue must have been present on the sail to supply the site with blood vessels. Layered lamellar bone makes up most of the neural spine's cross-sectional area, and contains lines of arrested growth that can be used to determine the age of each individual at death. In many specimens of D. gigashomogenes, the distal portions of spines bend sharply, indicating that the sail would have had an irregular profile in life. Their crookedness suggests that soft tissue may not have extended all the way to the tips of the spines, meaning that the sail's webbing may not have been as extensive as it is commonly imagined.

=== Tail ===
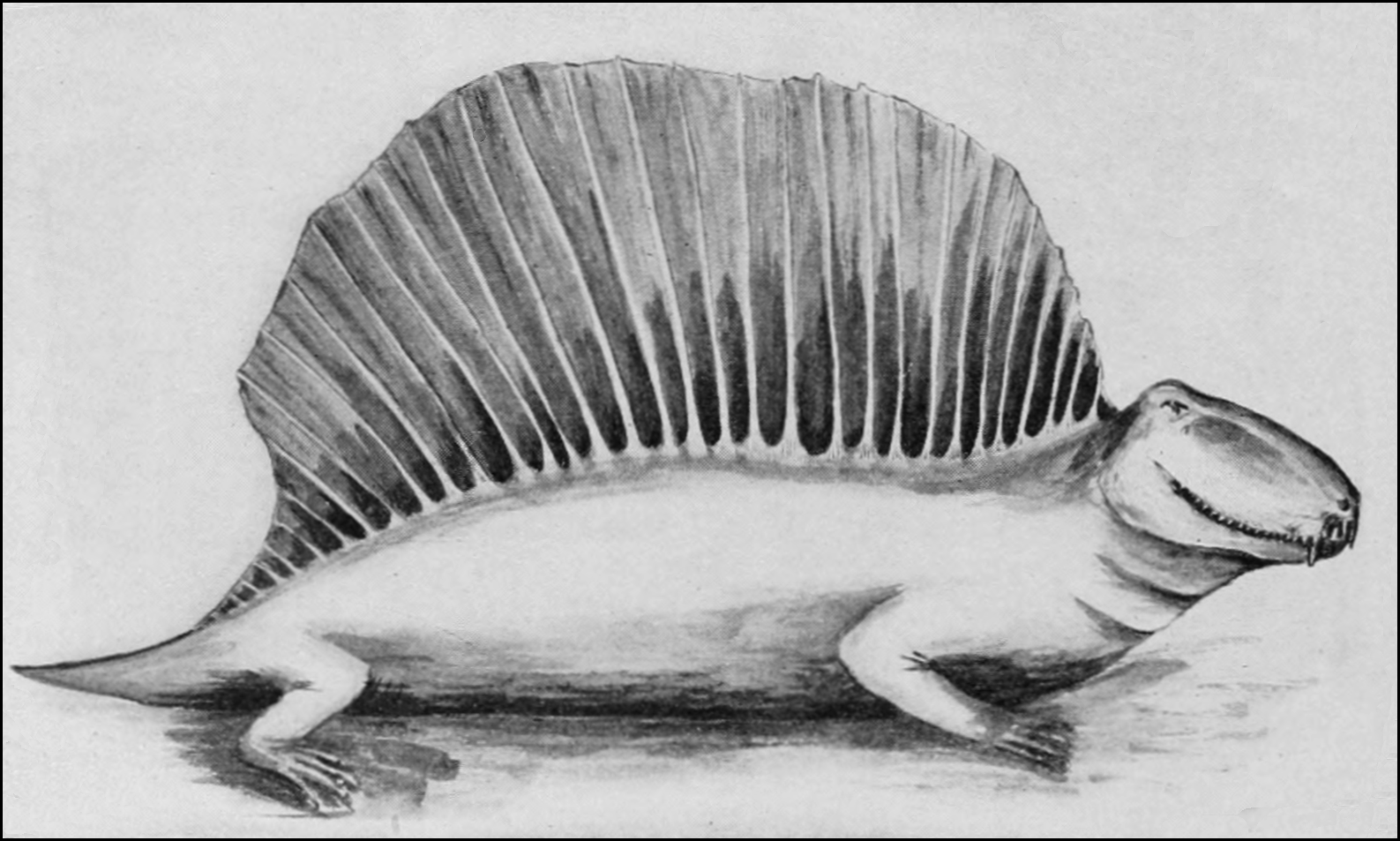
An outdated restoration of Dimetrodon from 1908 showing a short tail, made before the discovery of skeletons with complete tails

The tail of Dimetrodon makes up a large portion of its total body length and includes around 50 caudal vertebrae. Tails were missing or incomplete in the first described skeletons of Dimetrodon. The only caudal vertebrae known were the 11 closest to the hip. Since these first few caudal vertebrae narrow rapidly as they progress farther from the hip, many paleontologists in the late 19th and early 20th centuries thought that Dimetrodon had a very short tail. A largely complete tail of Dimetrodon was not described until 1927. One specimen of D. limbatus, AM 4636, preserves more than 40 caudal vertebrae, and even that is incomplete. While some species were restored as short-tailed even after the discovery of that specimen, like D. grandis, specimen WM 1002 contradicts this in preserving fourteen caudal vertebrae which do not diminish in size any more than other long-tailed species.

=== Skin ===
Scaly body impressions that likely were made by Dimetrodon teutonis were described in 2025 from the Early Permian Tambach Formation Bromacker site in Germany. Given the ichnogenus name Bromackerichnus, the impressions left by animals resting on mud show a rectangular scaly epidermis pattern on the belly, and on the underside of the tail, while a hexagonal scale pattern was present on the limbs, supporting the idea that early synapsids in general had a scaly body covering similar to reptiles.

== Classification ==
Dimetrodon is an early member of a group called synapsids, which include mammals and many of their extinct relatives, though it is not an ancestor of any mammal (which appeared millions of years later). It is often mistaken for a dinosaur in popular culture, despite having become extinct some 40 million years (Ma) before the first appearance of dinosaurs in the Triassic period. As a synapsid, Dimetrodon is more closely related to mammals than to dinosaurs or any living reptile. By the early 1900s most paleontologists called Dimetrodon a reptile in accordance with Linnean taxonomy, which ranked Reptilia as a class and Dimetrodon as a genus within that class. Mammals were assigned to a separate class, and Dimetrodon was described as a "mammal-like reptile". Paleontologists theorized that mammals evolved from this group in (what they called) a reptile-to-mammal transition.

=== Phylogenetic taxonomy of Synapsida ===
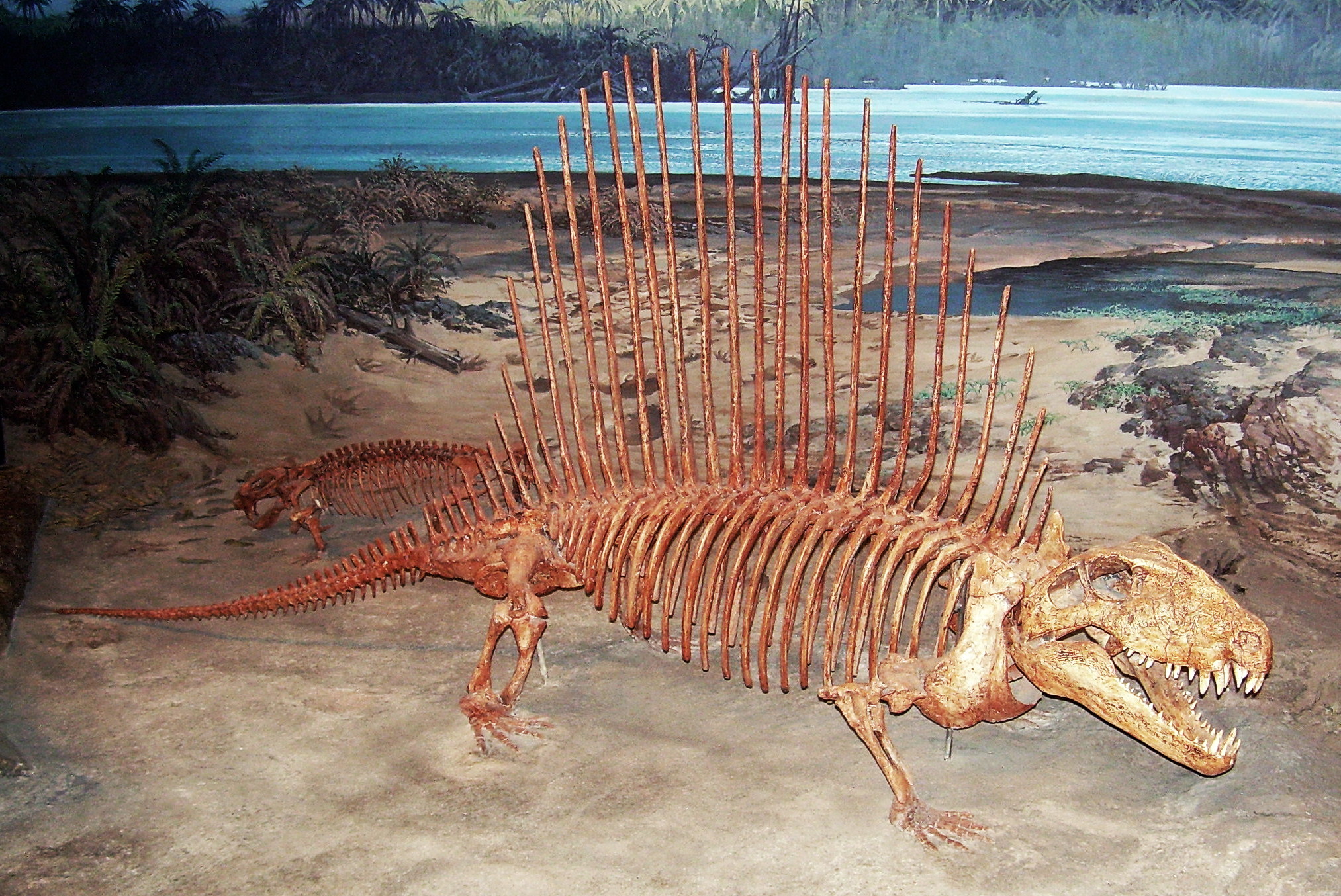
D. grandis skeleton, North American Museum of Ancient Life

Under phylogenetic systematics, the descendants of the last common ancestor of Dimetrodon and all living reptiles would include all mammals because Dimetrodon is more closely related to mammals than to any living reptile. Thus, if it is desired to avoid the clade that contains both mammals and the living reptiles, then Dimetrodon must not be included in that clade—nor any other "mammal-like reptile". Descendants of the last common ancestor of mammals and reptiles (which appeared around 310 Ma in the Late Carboniferous) are therefore split into two clades: Synapsida, which includes Dimetrodon and mammals, and Sauropsida, which includes living reptiles and all extinct reptiles more closely related to them than to mammals.

Within clade Synapsida, Dimetrodon is part of the clade Sphenacodontia, which was first proposed as an early synapsid group in 1940 by paleontologists Alfred Romer and Llewellyn Ivor Price, along with the groups Ophiacodontia and Edaphosauria. All three groups are known from the Late Carboniferous and Early Permian. Romer and Price distinguished them primarily by postcranial features such as the shapes of limbs and vertebrae. Ophiacodontia was considered the most primitive group because its members appeared the most reptilian, and Sphenacodontia was the most advanced because its members appeared the most like a group called Therapsida, which included the closest relatives to mammals. Romer and Price placed another group of early synapsids called varanopids within Sphenacodontia, considering them to be more primitive than other sphenacodonts like Dimetrodon. They thought varanopids and Dimetrodon-like sphenacodonts were closely related because both groups were carnivorous, although varanopids are much smaller and more lizard-like, lacking sails.

The modern view of synapsid relationships was proposed by paleontologist Robert R. Reisz in 1986, whose study included features mostly found in the skull rather than in the postcranial skeleton. Dimetrodon is still considered a sphenacodont under this phylogeny, but varanodontids are now considered more basal synapsids, falling outside clade Sphenacodontia. Within Sphenacodontia is the group Sphenacodontoidea, which in turn contains Sphenacodontidae and Therapsida. Sphenacodontidae is the group containing Dimetrodon and several other sail-backed synapsids like Sphenacodon and Secodontosaurus, while Therapsida includes mammals and their mostly Permian and Triassic relatives.

Below is the cladogram of the clade Synapsida, which reflects the results of an analysis conducted by Michael J. Benton in 2012:

- Amniota
  - Sauropsida (including dinosaurs, living reptiles and birds)
  - Synapsida
    - - †Ophiacodontidae
      - †Varanopidae
    - - †Caseasauria
      - - †Ianthodon schultzei
        - - †Edaphosauridae
          - Sphenacodontia
            - †Haptodus garnettensis
            - - †Pantelosaurus saxonicus
              - - †Sphenacodontidae
                  - †Cutleria wilmarthi
                  - - †Secodontosaurus obtusidens
                    - - †Cryptovenator hirschbergeri
                      - - †Dimetrodon spp.
                        - †Sphenacodon spp.
                - Therapsida (including mammals)

The below cladogram shows the relationships of a few Dimetrodon species, from Brink and colleagues (2015).

- Sphenacodontidae
  - Secodontosaurus
  - - - Sphenacodon
      - Ctenospondylus
    - - Dimetrodon milleri
      - - Dimetrodon limbatus
        - - Dimetrodon borealis
          - Dimetrodon grandis

=== Species ===
Around twenty species of Dimetrodon have been named, of which around 13 are currently recognised:

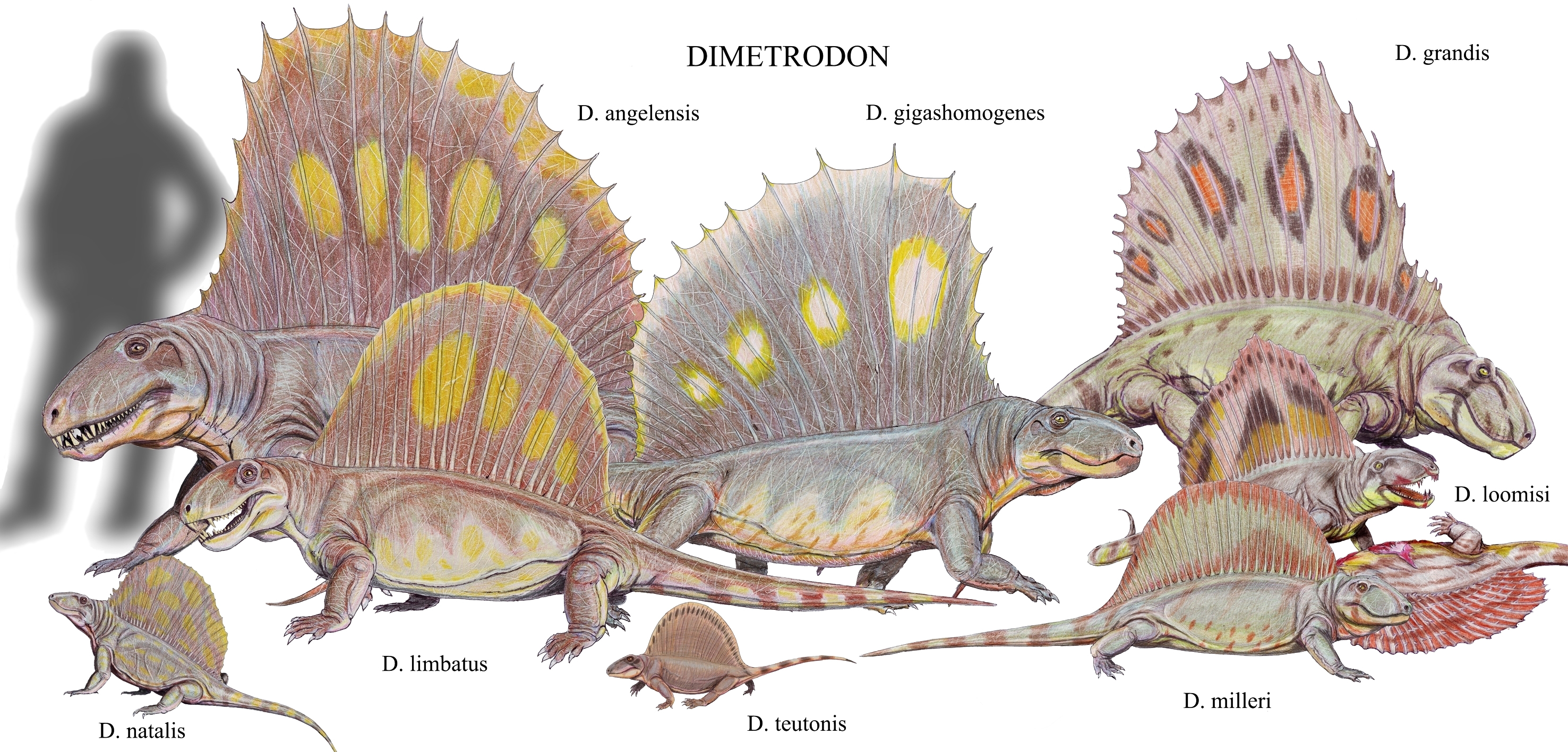
Artist impressions of various Dimetrodon species to scale

- †D. angelensis Olson, 1962
- †D. booneorum Romer, 1937
- †D. borealis (Leidy, 1854) Brink, Maddin, Evans, & Reisz, 2015
- †D. dollovianus (Cope, 1888) Case, 1907
- †D. giganhomogenes Case, 1907
- †D. grandis (Case, 1907) Romer and Price, 1940
- †D. limbatus (Cope, 1877) Romer and Price, 1940
- †D. loomisi Romer, 1937
- †D. macrospondylus (Cope, 1884) Case, 1907
- †D. milleri Romer, 1937
- †D. natalis (Cope, 1878) Romer, 1936
- †D. occidentalis Berman, 1977
- †D. teutonis Berman, Reisz, Martens, & Henrici, 2001

In 1940, Alfred Romer and Llewellyn Ivor Price put forward a classification scheme attempting to classify all of the Dimetrodon species that were known at the time. Their system involved two "series": series A, consisting of larger species with short torsos and short lower limbs (such as D. grandis), and series B, consisting of smaller species with shorter and lower skulls (such as D. loomisi).

== Paleobiology ==
=== Function of neural spines ===
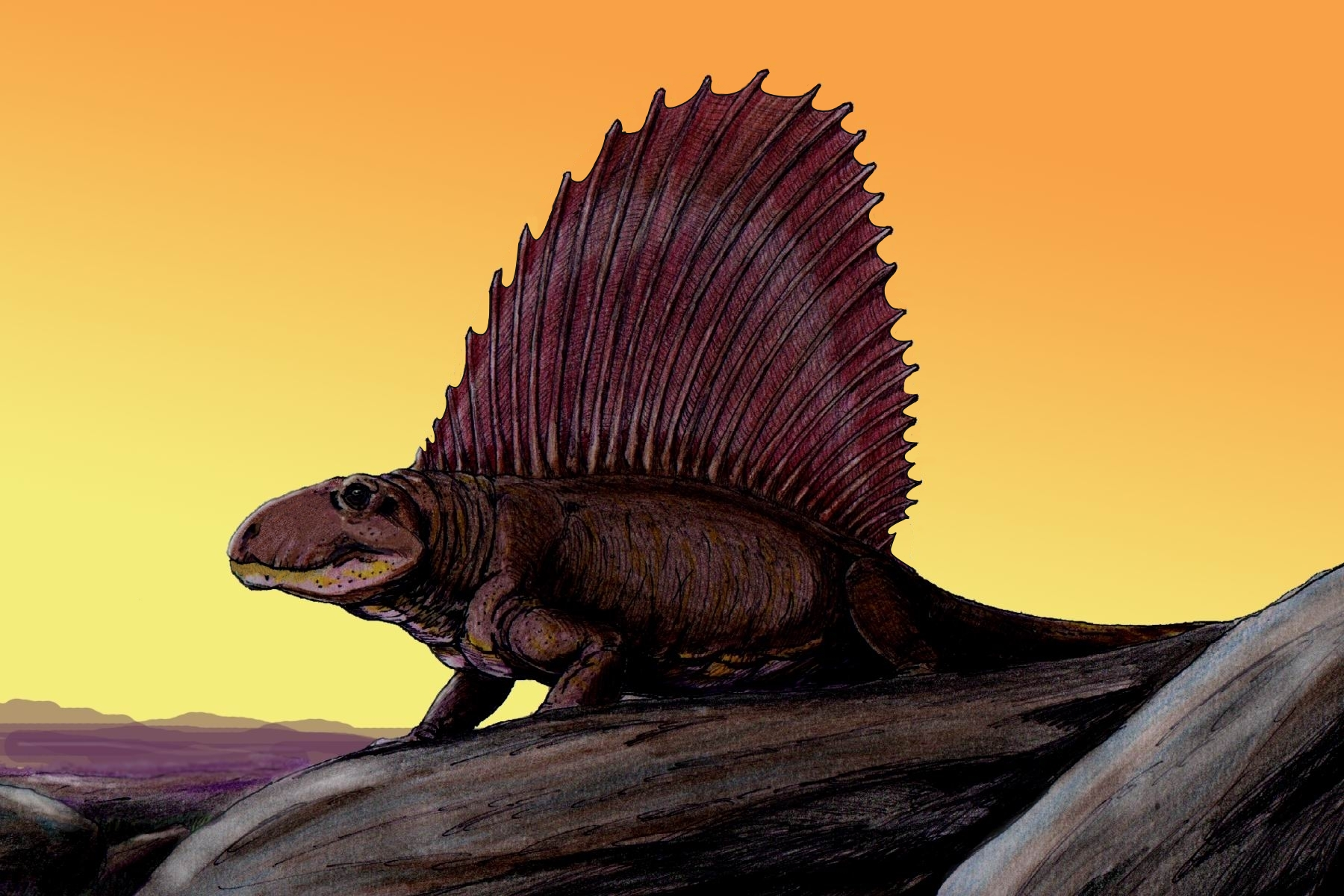
D. grandis warming up at sunrise

Paleontologists have proposed many ways in which the sail could have functioned in life. Some of the first to think about its purpose suggested that the sail may have served as camouflage among reeds while Dimetrodon waited for prey, or as an actual boat-like sail to catch the wind while the animal was in the water. Another is that the long neural spines could have stabilized the trunk by restricting up-and-down movement, which would allow for a more efficient side-to-side movement while walking.

==== Thermoregulation ====
In 1940, Alfred Romer and Llewellyn Ivor Price proposed that the sail served a thermoregulatory function, allowing individuals to warm their bodies with the Sun. In the following years, many models were created to estimate the effectiveness of thermoregulation in Dimetrodon. For example, in a 1973 article in the journal Nature, paleontologists C. D. Bramwell and P. B. Fellgett estimated that it took a 200 kilograms (440 lb) individual about one and a half hours for its body temperature to rise from 26 to 32 °C (79 to 90 °F). In 1986, Steven C. Haack concluded that the warming was slower than previously thought and that the process probably took four hours. Using a model based on a variety of environmental factors and hypothesized physiological aspects of Dimetrodon, Haack found that the sail allowed Dimetrodon to warm faster in the morning and reach a slightly higher body temperature during the day, but that it was ineffective in releasing excess heat and did not allow Dimetrodon to retain a higher body temperature at night. In 1999, a group of mechanical engineers created a computer model to analyze the ability of the sail to regulate body temperature during different seasons, and concluded that the sail was beneficial for capturing and releasing heat at all times in the year.

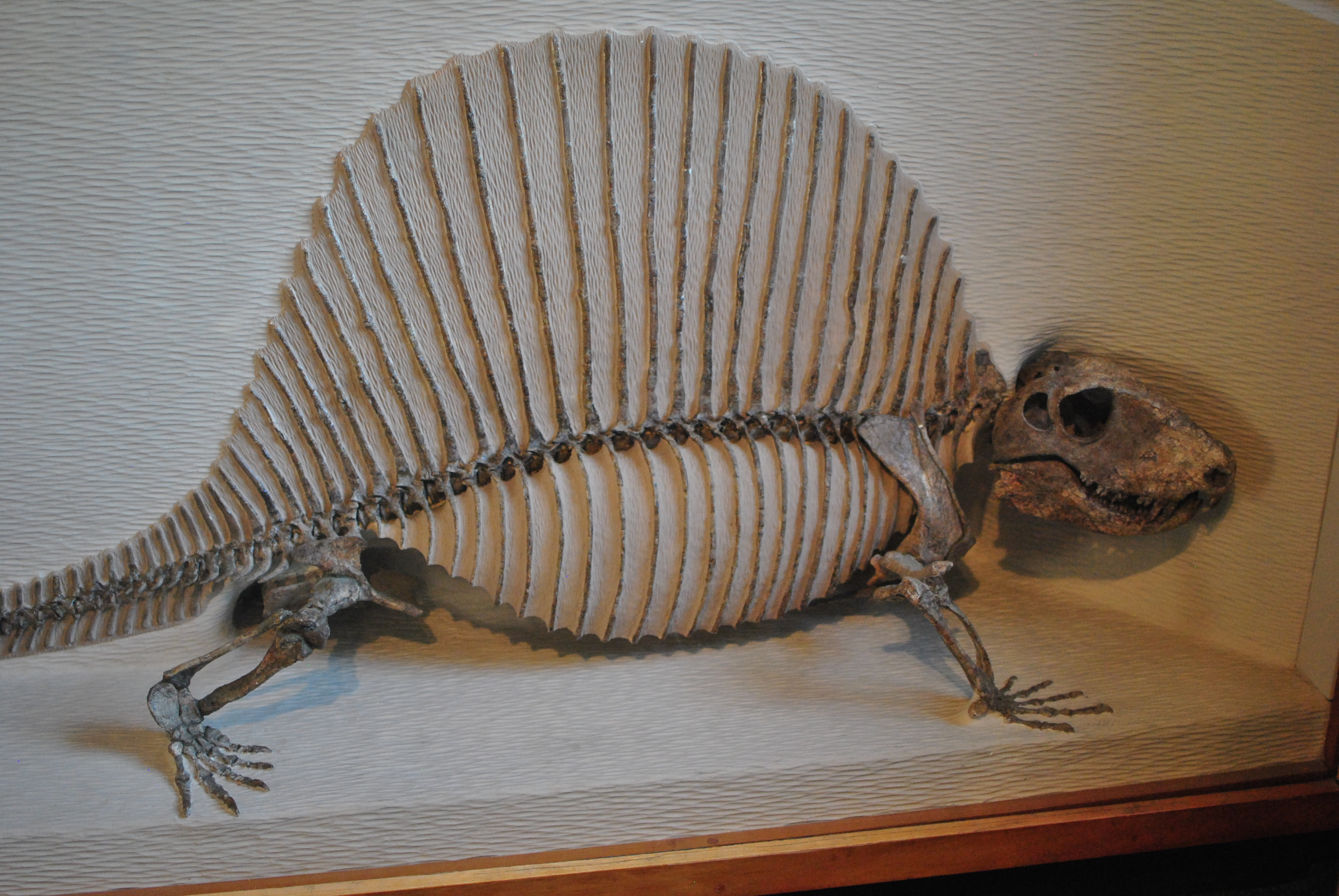
The comparatively small D. milleri

Most of these studies give two thermoregulatory roles for the sail of Dimetrodon: one as a means of warming quickly in the morning, and another as a way to cool down when body temperature becomes high. Dimetrodon and all other Early Permian land vertebrates are assumed to have been cold-blooded or poikilothermic, relying on the sun to maintain a high body temperature. Because of its large size, Dimetrodon had high thermal inertia, meaning that changes in body temperature occurred more slowly in it than in smaller-bodied animals. As temperatures rose in the mornings, the small-bodied prey of Dimetrodon could warm their bodies much faster than could something the size of Dimetrodon. Many paleontologists including Haack have proposed that the sail of Dimetrodon may have allowed it to warm quickly in the morning in order to keep pace with its prey. The sail's large surface area also meant heat could dissipate quickly into the surroundings, useful if the animal needed to release excess heat produced by metabolism or absorbed from the sun. Dimetrodon may have angled its sail away from the sun to cool off or restricted blood flow to the sail to maintain heat at night.

In 1986, J. Scott Turner and C. Richard Tracy proposed that the evolution of a sail in Dimetrodon was related to the evolution of warm-bloodedness in mammal ancestors. They thought that the sail of Dimetrodon enabled it to be homeothermic, maintaining a constant, albeit low, body temperature. Mammals are also homeothermic, although they differ from Dimetrodon in being endothermic, controlling their body temperature internally through heightened metabolism. Turner and Tracy noted that early therapsids, a more advanced group of synapsids closely related to mammals, had long limbs which can release heat in a manner similar to that of the sail of Dimetrodon. The homeothermy that developed in animals like Dimetrodon may have carried over to therapsids through a modification of body shape, which would eventually develop into the warm-bloodedness of mammals.

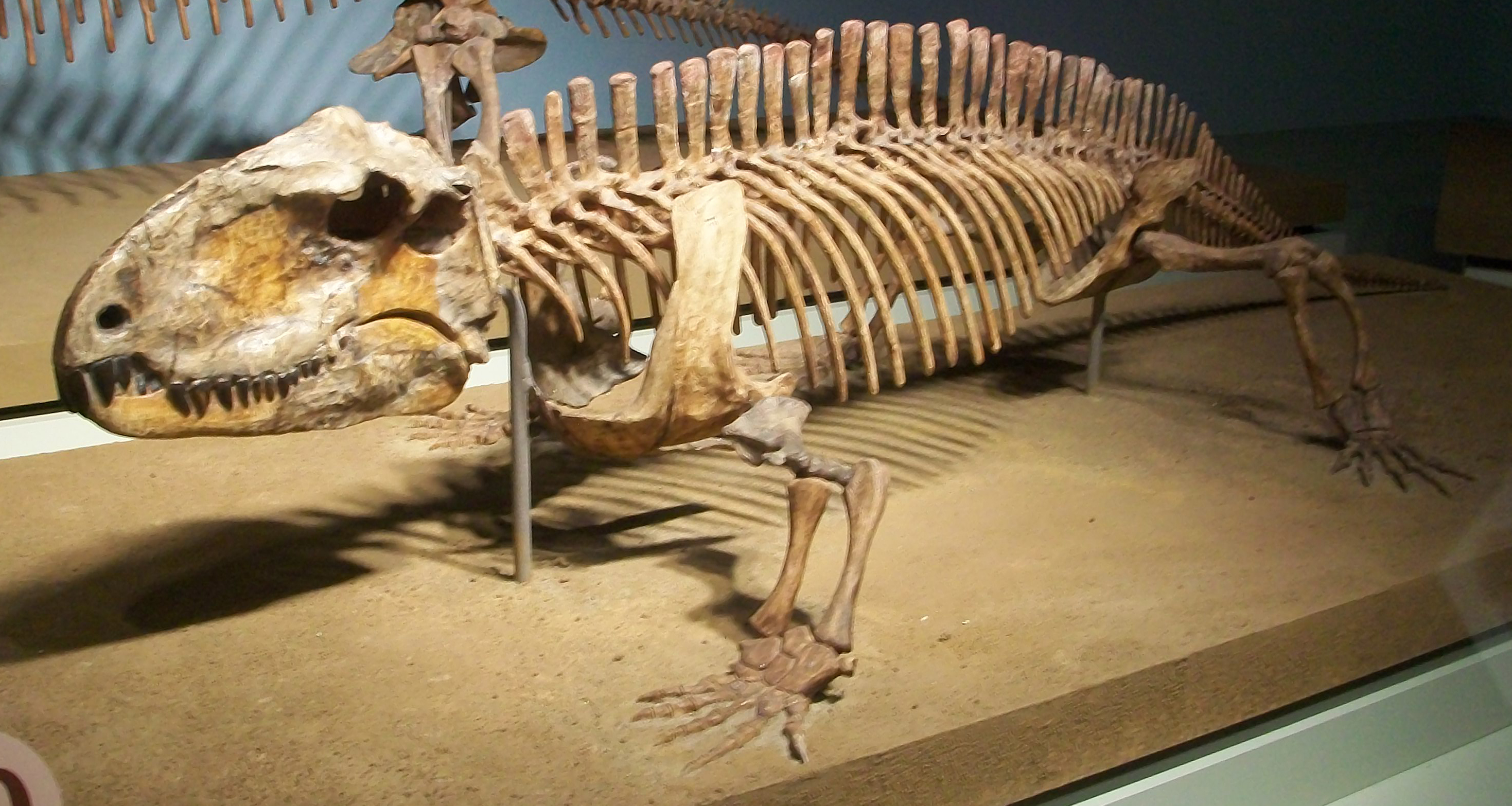
Sphenacodon had a low crest along its back

Recent studies on the sail of Dimetrodon and other sphenacodontids support Haack's 1986 contention that the sail was poorly adapted to releasing heat and maintaining a stable body temperature. The presence of sails in small-bodied species of Dimetrodon such as D. milleri and D. teutonis does not fit the idea that the sail's purpose was thermoregulation because smaller sails are less able to transfer heat and because small bodies can absorb and release heat easily on their own. Moreover, close relatives of Dimetrodon such as Sphenacodon have very low crests that would have been useless as thermoregulatory devices. The large sail of Dimetrodon is thought to have developed gradually from these smaller crests, meaning that over most of the sail's evolutionary history, thermoregulation may not have served an important function. It should be noted however global temperatures soared during the Permian, with the region that is now the central United States reaching 165 °F (74 °C).

Although the function of its sail remains uncertain, Dimetrodon and other Sphenacodontids were likely to have been whole-body endotherms, characterised by a high energy metabolism (tachymetabolism) and probably a capacity for maintaining a high and stable body temperature. This conclusion was part of an amniote-wide study that found tachymetabolic endothermy to have been widespread throughout, and likely plesiomorphic to both synapsids and sauropsids. For Dimetrodon the evidence was the endothermy-indicative size of the foramina through which blood was delivered to their long bones and the high blood pressure that would have been necessary to provide blood to the tops of the well-vascularised spines supporting the sail.

Larger bodied specimens of Dimetrodon have notably larger sails than would be predicted if the sail size was only proportionate scaled to their increase in body size, an example of positive allometry. Positive allometry may benefit thermoregulation because it means that, as individuals get larger, surface area increases more slowly than mass. Larger-bodied animals generate a great deal of heat through metabolism, and the amount of heat that must be dissipated from the body surface is significantly greater than what must be dissipated by smaller-bodied animals. Effective heat dissipation can be predicted across many different animals with a single relationship between mass and surface area. However, a 2010 study of allometry in Dimetrodon found a different relationship between its sail and body mass: the actual scaling exponent of the sail was much larger than the exponent expected in an animal adapted to heat dissipation. The researchers concluded that the sail of Dimetrodon grew at a much faster rate than was necessary for thermoregulation, and suggested that sexual selection was the primary reason for its evolution.

==== Sexual selection ====
The allometric exponent for sail height is similar in magnitude to the scaling of interspecific antler length to shoulder height in cervids. Furthermore, as Bakker (1970) observed in the context of Dimetrodon, many lizard species raise a dorsal ridge of skin during threat and courtship displays, and positively allometric, sexually dimorphic frills and dewlaps are present in extant lizards (Echelle et al. 1978; Christian et al. 1995). There is also evidence of sexual dimorphism both in the robustness of the skeleton and in the relative height of the spines of D. limbatus (Romer and Price 1940).

=== Sexual dimorphism ===
Dimetrodon may have been sexually dimorphic, meaning that males and females had slightly different body sizes. Some specimens of Dimetrodon have been hypothesized as males because they have thicker bones, larger sails, longer skulls, and more pronounced maxillary "steps" than others. Based on these differences, the mounted skeletons in the American Museum of Natural History (AMNH 4636) and the Field Museum of Natural History may be males and the skeletons in the Denver Museum of Nature and Science (MCZ 1347) and the University of Michigan Museum of Natural History may be females.

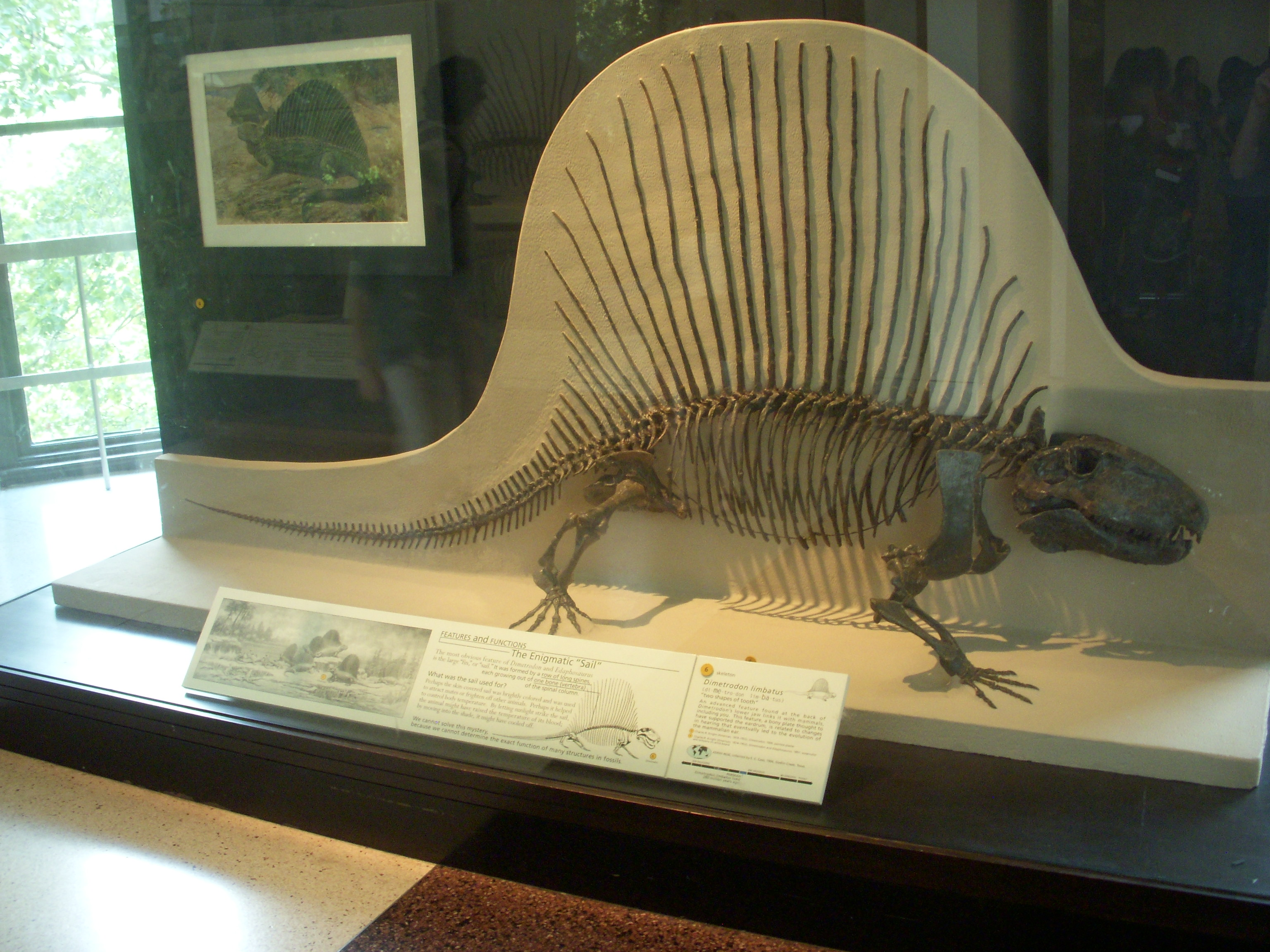
The mounted D. limbatus skeleton AMNH 4636 may represent the male type.

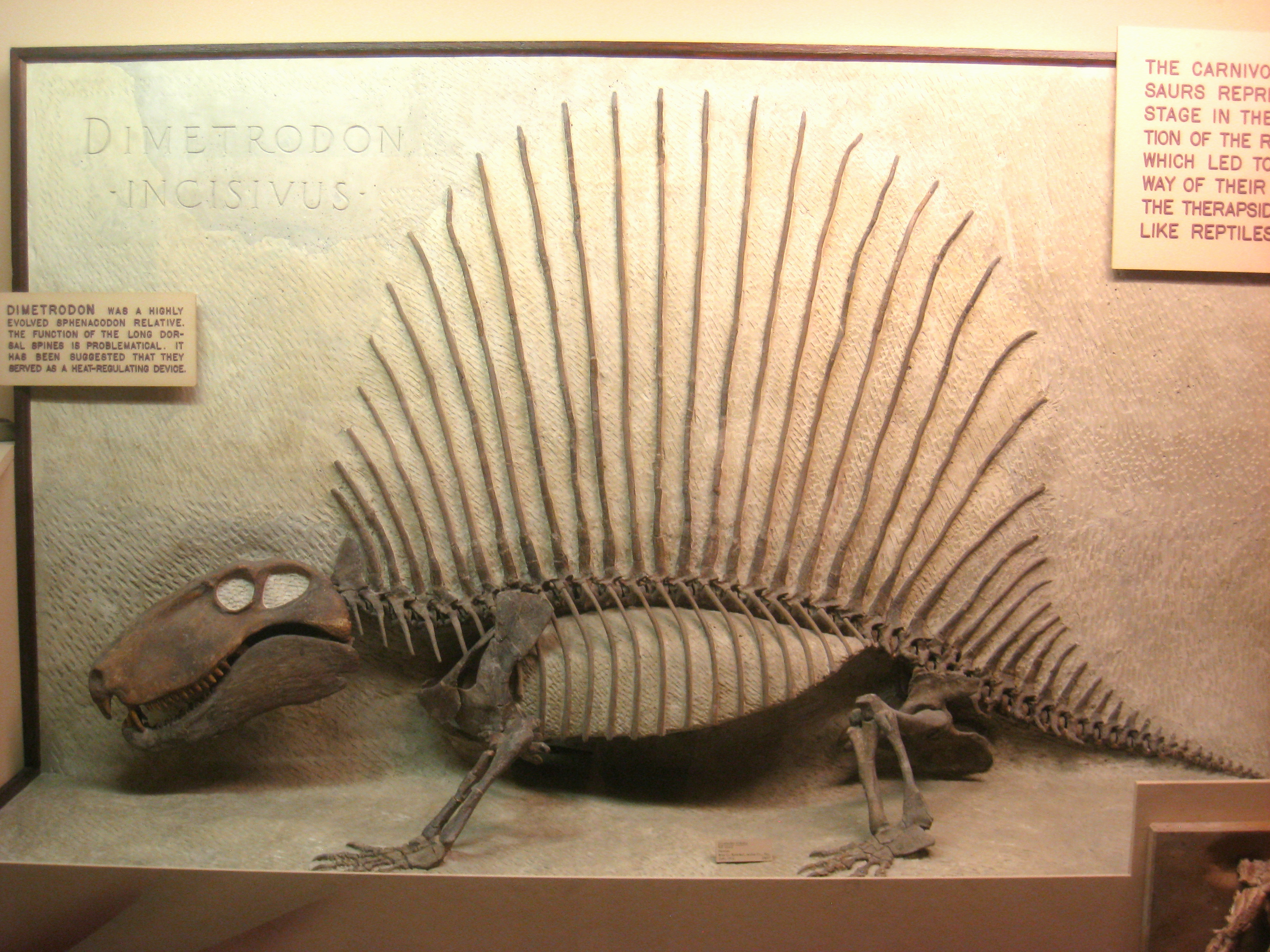
The D. incisivus skeleton in the University of Michigan Museum of Natural History may represent the female type.

=== Histology ===
Histological analysis between D. natalis and D. teutonis found different growth strategies between both Dimetrodon species, despite their small sizes. D. natalis was thought to have achieved small body size through truncated development, but kept relatively fast growth rates similar to other North American Dimetrodon species. D. teutonis long bone exhibited reduced growth rates, possibly for an extended period of time. This was thought to have been the result of both species of Dimetrodon living in different environments as D. teutonis was recovered in a small inland/upland, internally drained, and geographically isolated environment with limited resources and a highly seasonal climate. In comparison, D. natalis lived in lowland environments and coexisted with larger species of Dimetrodon, as well as Secodontosaurus. It is also hypothesized because of higher predation pressure, rapid growth rates would've enabled earlier reproduction and increasing reproductive success.

== Paleoecology ==
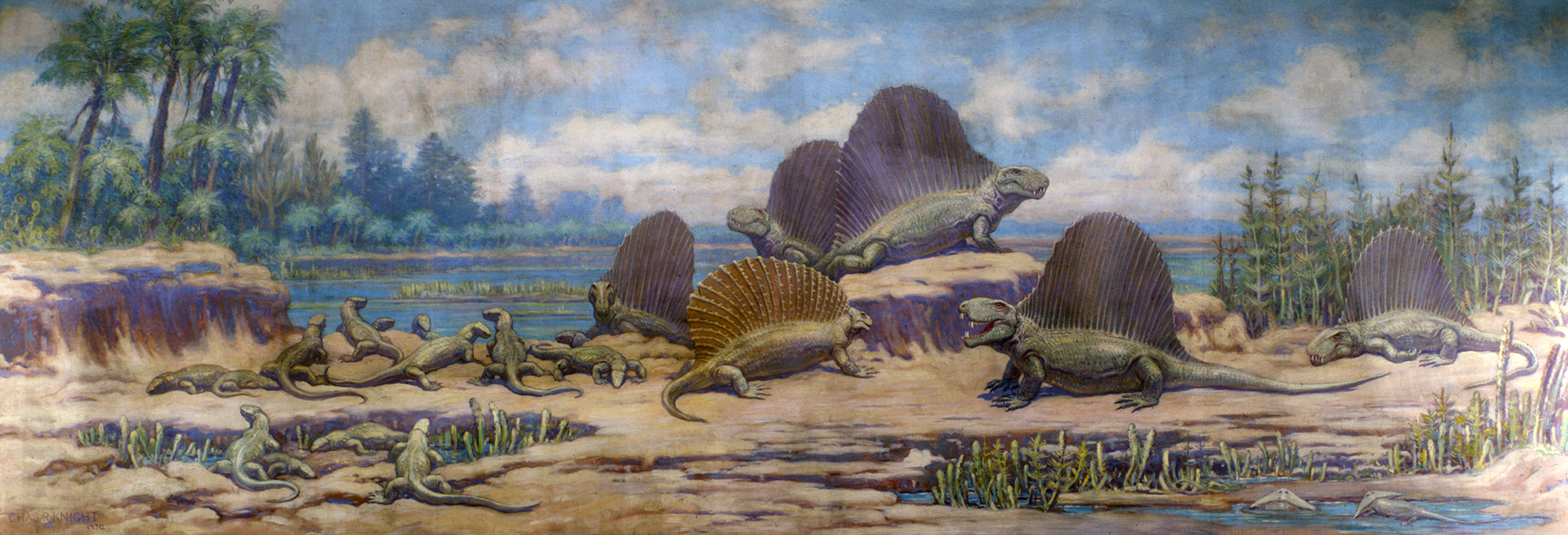
Charles R. Knight's 1930 mural in the Field Museum depicting Dimetrodon along with Edaphosaurus (center), Casea (left) and the amphibian Diplocaulus (right) in a Permian wetland scene from Texas

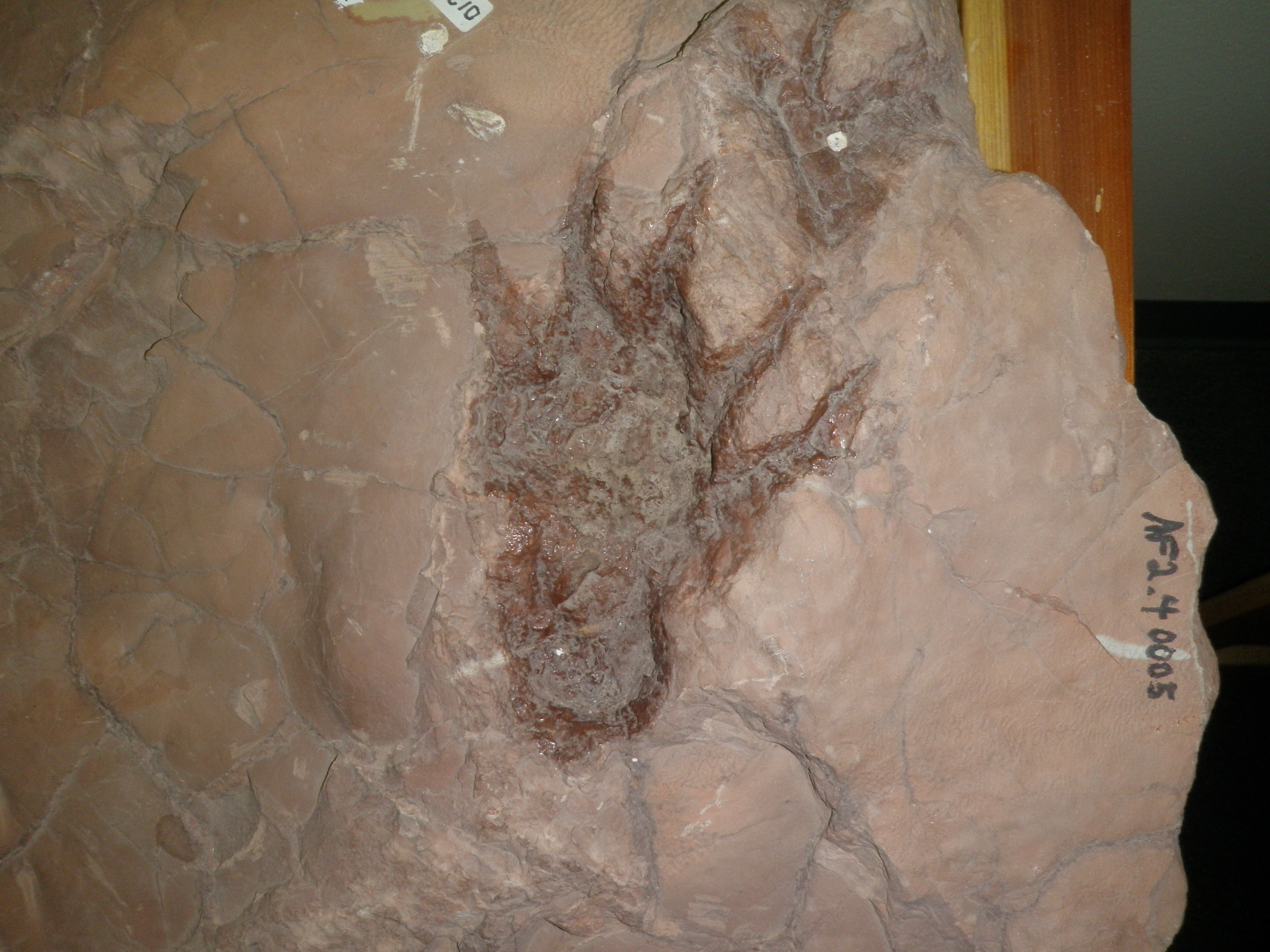
Possible Dimetrodon footprint, Prehistoric Trackways National Monument

Fossils of Dimetrodon are known from the United States (Texas, Oklahoma, New Mexico, Arizona, Utah and Ohio), Canada (Prince Edward Island) and Germany, areas that were part of the supercontinent Euramerica during the Early Permian. Within the United States, almost all material attributed to Dimetrodon has come from three geological groups in north-central Texas and south-central Oklahoma: the Clear Fork Group, the Wichita Group, and the Pease River Group. Most fossil finds are part of lowland ecosystems which, during the Permian, would have been vast wetlands. In particular, the Red Beds of Texas is an area of great diversity of fossil tetrapods, or four-limbed vertebrates. In addition to Dimetrodon, the most common tetrapods in the Red Beds and throughout Early Permian deposits in the southwestern United States, are the amphibians Archeria, Diplocaulus, Eryops, and Trimerorhachis, the reptiliomorph Seymouria, the reptile Captorhinus, and the synapsids Ophiacodon and Edaphosaurus. These tetrapods made up a group of animals that paleontologist Everett C. Olson called the "Permo-Carboniferous chronofauna", a fauna that dominated the continental Euramerican ecosystem for several million years. Based on the geology of deposits like the Red Beds, the fauna is thought to have inhabited a well-vegetated lowland deltaic ecosystem.

=== Food web ===
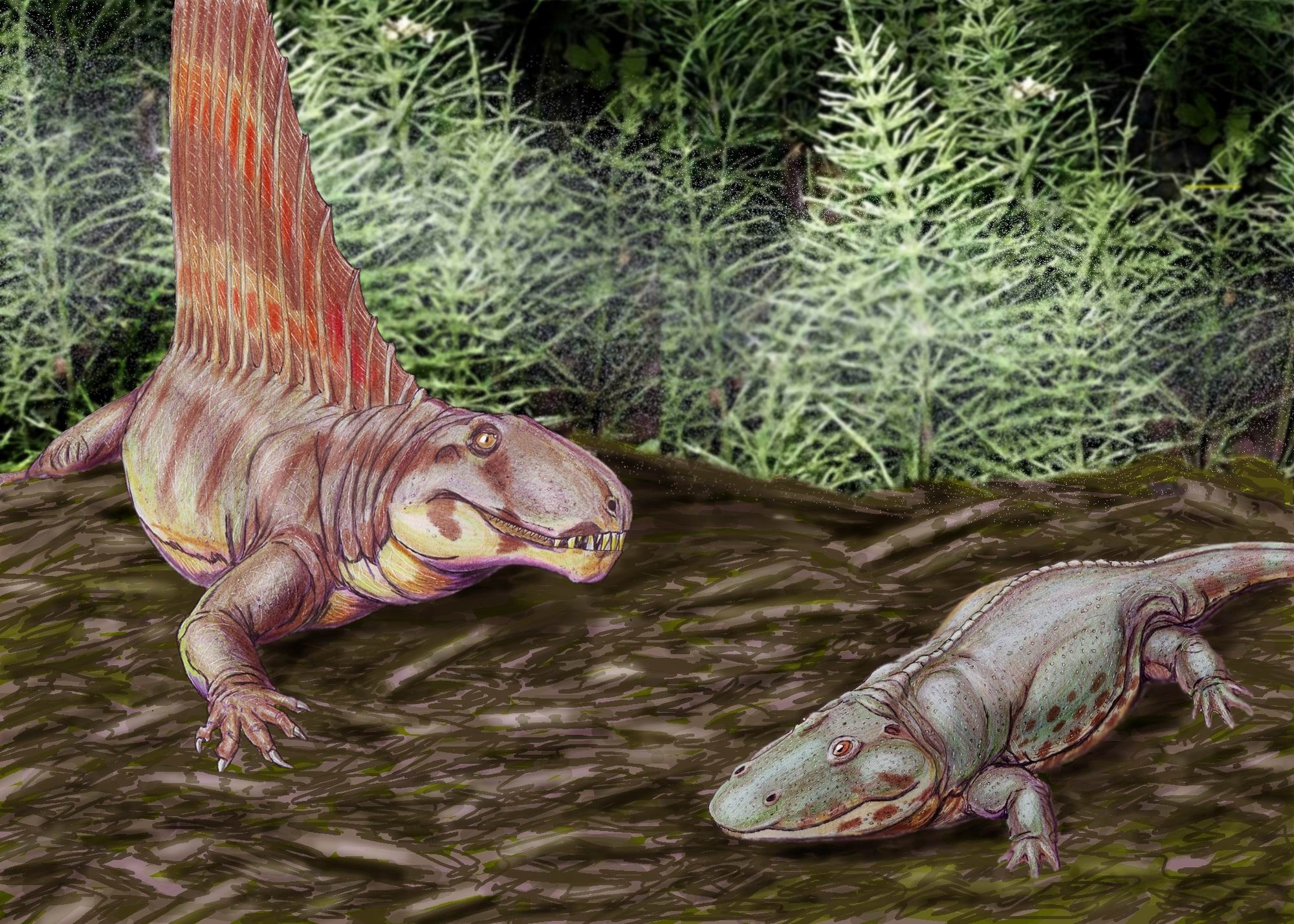
Restoration of D. grandis and the temnospondyl Eryops, both found in the Red Beds of Texas

Olson made many inferences on the paleoecology of the Texas Red beds and the role of Dimetrodon within its ecosystem. He proposed several main types of ecosystems in which the earliest tetrapods lived. Dimetrodon belonged to the most primitive ecosystem, which developed from aquatic food webs. In it, aquatic plants were the primary producers and were largely fed upon by fish and aquatic invertebrates. Most land vertebrates fed on these aquatic primary consumers. Dimetrodon was probably the top predator of the Red Beds ecosystem, feeding on a variety of organisms such as the shark Xenacanthus (in turn, Xenacanthus may have preyed on Dimetrodon), the aquatic amphibians Trimerorhachis and Diplocaulus, and the terrestrial tetrapods Seymouria and Trematops. Insects are known from the Early Permian Red Beds and were probably involved to some degree in the same food web as Dimetrodon, feeding small reptiles like Captorhinus. The Red Beds assemblage also included some of the first large land-living herbivores like Edaphosaurus and Diadectes. Feeding primarily on terrestrial plants, these herbivores did not derive their energy from aquatic food webs. According to Olson, the best modern analogue for the ecosystem Dimetrodon inhabited is the Everglades. The exact lifestyle of Dimetrodon (amphibious to terrestrial) has long been controversial, but bone microanatomy supports a terrestrial lifestyle, which implies that it would have fed mostly on land, on the banks, or in very shallow water. Evidence also exists for Dimetrodon preying on aestivating Diplocaulus during times of drought, with three partially eaten juvenile Diplocaulus in a burrow of eight bearing teeth marks from a Dimetrodon that unearthed and killed them.

The only species of Dimetrodon found outside North America is D. teutonis from Germany. Its remains were found in the Tambach Formation in a fossil site called the Bromacker locality. The Bromacker's assemblage of Early Permian tetrapods is unusual in that there are few large-bodied synapsids serving the role of top predators. D. teutonis is estimated to have been only 14 kilograms (31 lb) in weight, too small to prey on the large diadectid herbivores that are abundant in the Bromacker assemblage. It more likely ate small vertebrates and insects. Only three fossils can be attributed to large predators, and they are thought to have been either large varanopids or small sphenacodonts, both of which could potentially prey on D. teutonis. In contrast to the lowland deltaic Red Beds of Texas, the Bromacker deposits are thought to have represented an upland environment with no aquatic species. It is possible that large-bodied carnivores were not part of the Bromacker assemblage because they were dependent on large aquatic amphibians for food.

== Extinction ==
Dimetrodon, as well as most "pelycosaurs", saw a major drop in diversity or total extinction as the result of Olson's Extinction. The existence of this extinction event has been debated by experts, with some experts suggesting the supposed decline in diversity was due to the shift in location of greatest sample sizes from the palaeo-equatorial to the palaeo-temperate regions. However, more recent reviews of tetrapod-baring formations by Brocklehurst and colleagues found evidence of faunal turnovers, suggesting it was unlikely to have been a shift in location of greatest sample sizes. The transition of the extinction event wasn't consistent globally, with the extinction being more gradual in North America compared to Russia. Additional analysis found evidence of Dimetrodon and several "pelycosaurs" clades had a stagnation or even a decline in diversity for 20 Ma in contrast to their rapid diversification during the Pennsylvanian.

Six to eight Dimetrodon species were noted to have gone extinct during the mid-Kungurian extinction event roughly 278.9 Ma. The mid-Kungurian extinction event coincided with the volcanism from Tarim III and Qiangtang and Okhotsk-Taigonos and Choiyoi regions. Additionally, the melting of the Gondwanan ice sheet was thought to have released light carbon from destabilized methane hydrates. The last Dimetrodon species, D. angelensis, was able to persist into Middle Permian, however as a survivor of Olson's Extinction it was noted to have been a "dead clade walking".

== See also ==
- Secodontosaurus – Extinct genus of synapsids
- Edaphosaurus – Extinct genus of synapsids
- Olson's Extinction — an extinction event that wiped out most of the pelycosaurian synapsids, including Dimetrodon
