= Prehistoric Trackways National Monument =

National monument in New Mexico, United States

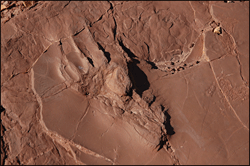

- Location within New Mexico Location within the United States
- Interactive map of Prehistoric Trackways National Monument
- Location: Doña Ana County, NM, USA
- Nearest city: Las Cruces, New Mexico
- Coordinates: 32°21′0″N 106°54′0″W
- Area: 5,255 acres (2,127 ha)
- Established: March 30, 2009
- Governing body: Bureau of Land Management
- Website: Prehistoric Trackways National Monument

U.S. National Monument

Prehistoric Trackways National Monument is a national monument in the Robledo Mountains of Doña Ana County, New Mexico, United States, near the city of Las Cruces. The monument's Paleozoic Era fossils are on 5,255 acres (2,127 ha) of land administered by the Bureau of Land Management. It became the 100th active U.S. national monument when it was designated on March 30, 2009.

== Fossils ==
The Prehistoric Trackways National Monument site includes a major deposit of Paleozoic Era fossilized footprints in fossil mega-trackways of land animals, sea creatures, and insects. These are known as trace fossils or ichnofossils. There are also fossilized plants and petrified wood present, as well as plenty of marine invertebrate fossils including brachiopods, gastropods, cephalopods, bivalves, and echinoderms. Much of the fossilized material originated during the Permian Period and is around 280 million years old.

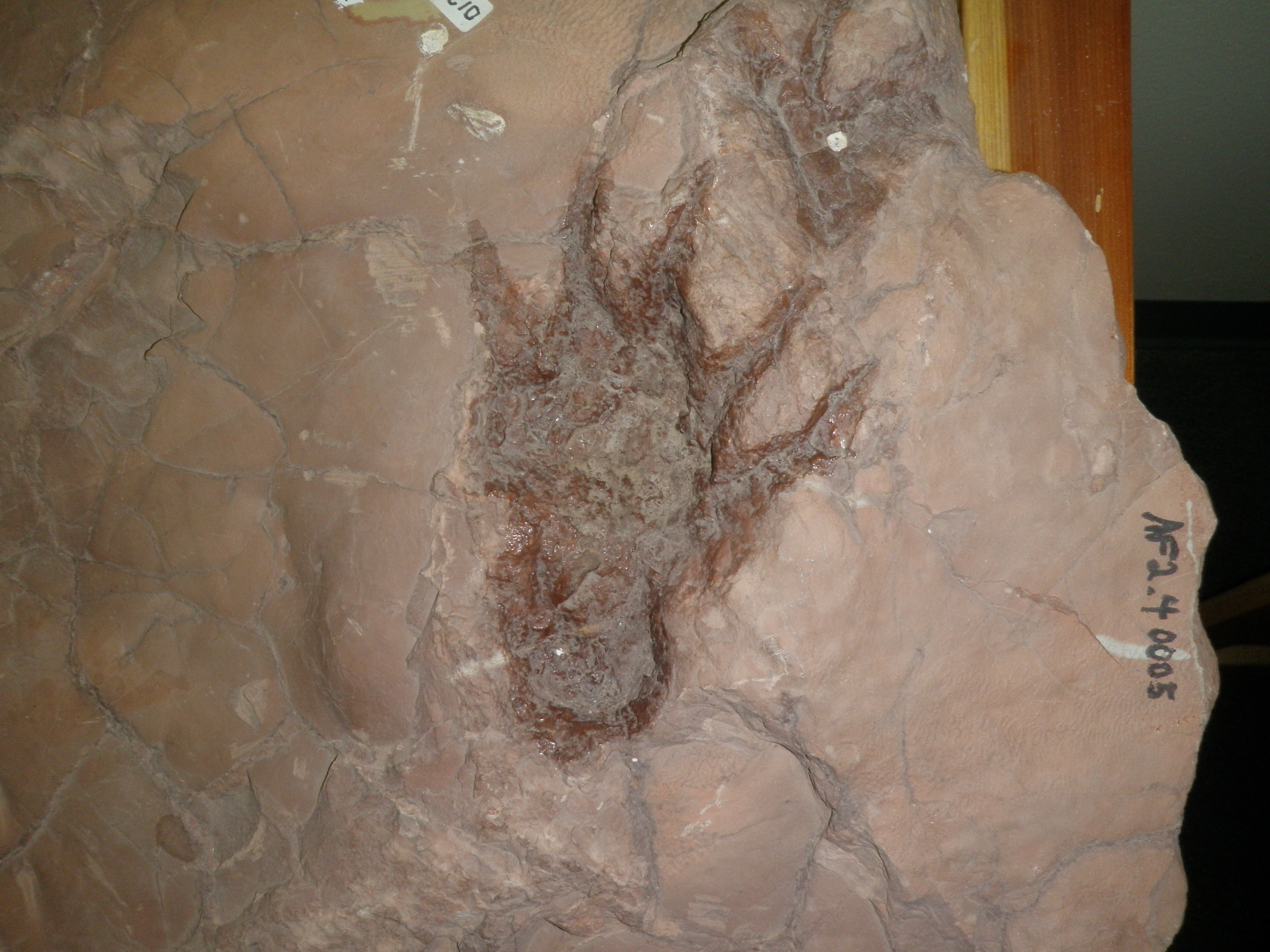
Possible Dimetrodon track

Some of the animals who may have left tracks in the Robledo Mountains include Dimetrodon, Eryops, Edaphosaurus, and multiple other pelycosaurs. There are at least 13 major trace fossils found at the monument, including Selenichnites (sel-EEN-ick-NIGHT eez) or moon-shaped trace, Kouphichnium (koof-ICK-nee-um) or light trace, Palmichnium (pal-ICK-nee-um) or palm [frond] trace, Octopodichnus (oct-toe-pod-ICK-nuss) or eight-footed trace, Lithographus (lith-oh-GRAFF-us) or rock writing, Tonganoxichnus (tong-a-nox-ICK-nuss) or Tonganoxie [Kansas] trace, Augerinoichnus (aw-gurr-EE-no-ICK-nuss) or Augerino trace, Undichna (und-ICK-nuh) or wave-shaped trace, Serpentichnus (serpent-ICK-nuss) or snake-like trace, Batrachichnus (baa-track ICK-nuss) or frog trace, Dromopus (dro-MOE-puss) or running foot, and Dimetropus (die-MEET-row-puss) or Dimetrodon foot.

The trackways can be difficult for the general public to find, as the monument is largely undeveloped with few facilities yet existing to aid fossil hunters. Many of the slabs pulled out by Jerry MacDonald are housed at the New Mexico Museum of Natural History and Science, although they are not on display at this time. Guided hikes are periodically offered by BLM interpretive staff.

== Geology ==
The monument lies along the western portion of the Rio Grande rift and is within part of the Robledo Mountains. It is made up of Cenozoic alluvium and intrusive rock and Paleozoic (robledo mountain formation) sediments. The Robledo Mountain Formation is Early Permian in age, specifically late wolfcampian (Late Artinskian) around 286 million years old. Most of the monument is Permian and would have been underwater or along the coast of what was once the Hueco Seaway. The tracks can be found in the red rock of the Robledo Mountains Member of the Hueco Formation. The rocks of the Robledo Mountains Formation interfingers with the fossil rich Abo Formation. This means the units represent laterally equivalent and contemporary environments. The Abo Formation has produced body fossils of Dimetrodon,Edaphosaurus,Eryops and numerous other vertebrates. This indicates the animals of the Abo Formation were the likely track makers at PTNM.

== Flora and fauna ==
The monument is situated at the northern tip of the Chihuahuan Desert. Some examples of plants within the monument are ocotillo, mesquite, creosote bush, prickly-pear cactus, Torrey yucca, barrel cactus, sotol, agave and snakeweed. A few of the animals that you may see are mule deer, rattlesnakes, desert cottontail, many species of lizards, and several species of birds.

== Climate ==
On average the coolest month in the monument is January with an average high of 57 °F (14 °C), the hottest month is June with an average high temperature of 94 °F (34 °C), and the wettest month is August with about 2.52 inches (64 mm) of precipitation.

== Discovery ==
In situ Paleozoic Era tracks were discovered on June 6, 1987, by Jerry Paul MacDonald. Scattered footprints had been found in the Robledos for almost fifty years prior to MacDonald starting his search. He used the recollections of local hikers, quarrymen, and fossil hunters to concentrate his search. This initial site was named the "Discovery Site". It is one of the best places in the monument for visitors to see fossilized tracks. Jerry MacDonald excavated three long trackways, carrying over 2500 slabs out from the site on his back. The majority of the slabs are housed in the New Mexico Museum of Natural History and Science in the Jerry MacDonald Paleozoic Trackways Collection. Two other continuous trackways are held in the Carnegie Museum of Natural History and Smithsonian.

== Monument designation ==
Prehistoric Trackways National Monument was sponsored by Senators Jeff Bingaman (D-NM) and Pete Domenici (R-NM) and was part of the National Landscape Conservation System of the United States of America under the Omnibus Public Land Management Act, signed into law on March 30, 2009. It was the first national monument established under the Barack Obama administration, and the fourth established in 2009. At the time of its establishment, it was the 100th active national monument in the United States (not the 100th national monument ever designated, since some monuments were previously designated and later dissolved, but the 100th national monument still in operation).

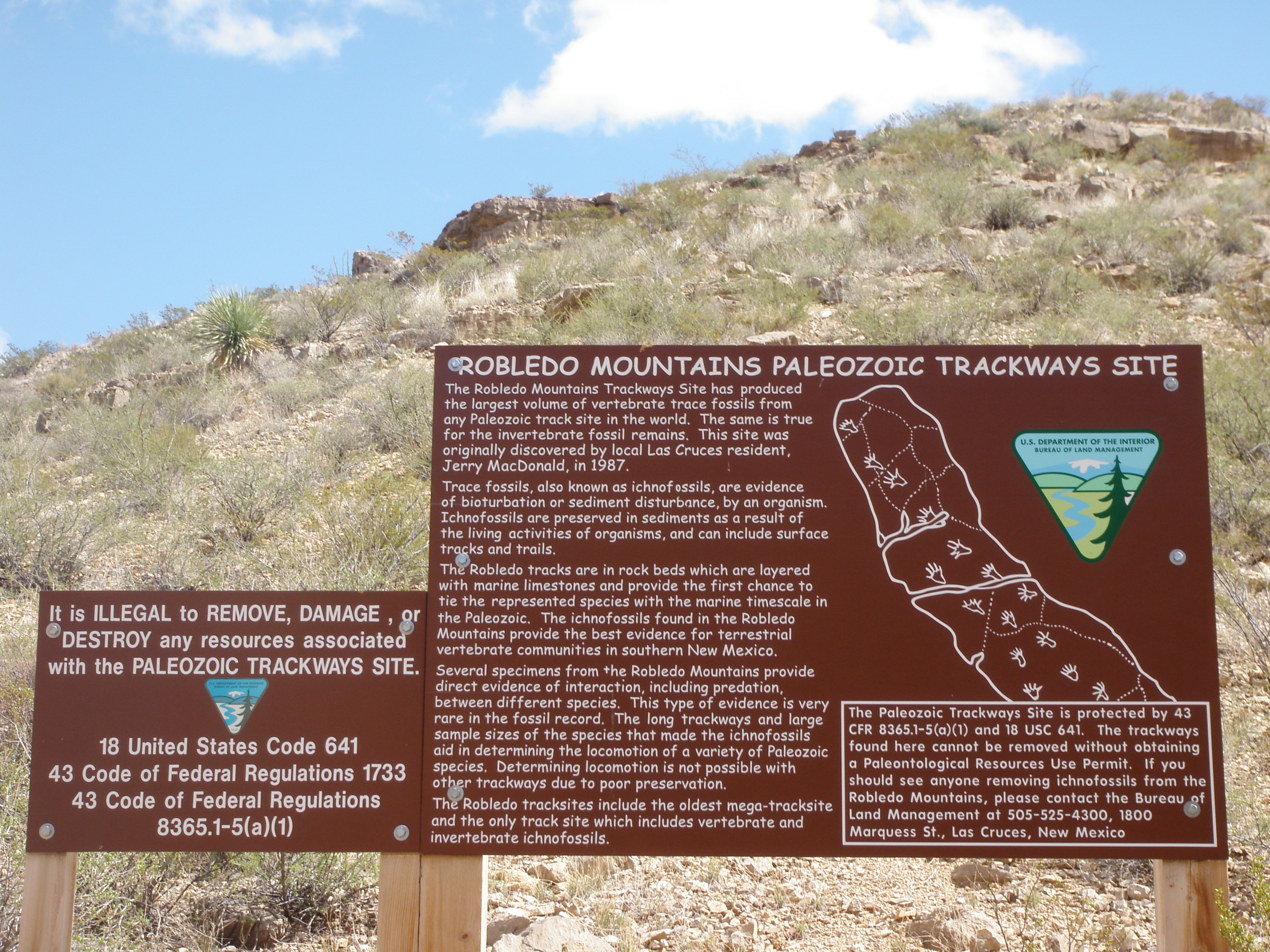
BLM sign at the discovery site

== Recreation ==
OHV, horseback riding and mountain biking is permitted along the designated paths and hiking as well as camping can be done along informal trails across the desert.

== See also ==
- List of national monuments of the United States
- Walchia
- Fossil trackways in the United States
- Organ Mountains–Desert Peaks National Monument
- White Sands National Park
