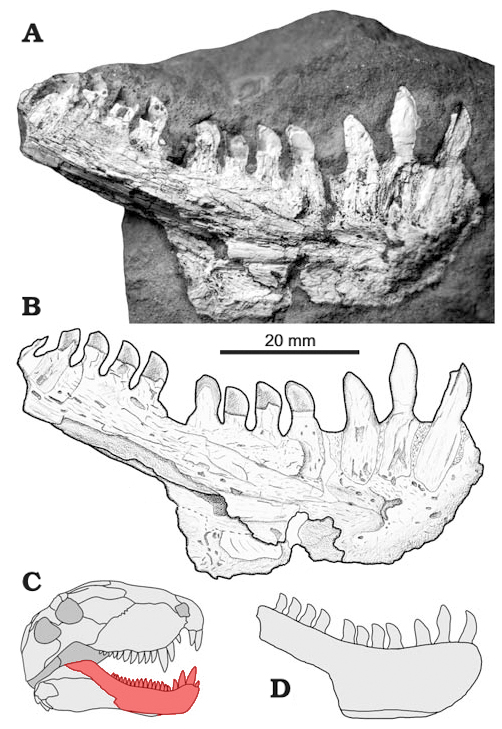
- Holotype

Scientific classification
- Kingdom: Animalia
- Phylum: Chordata
- Clade: Synapsida
- Family: †Sphenacodontidae
- Subfamily: †Sphenacodontinae
- Genus: †Cryptovenator; Fröbisch et al., 2011

Type species
- †Cryptovenator hirschbergeri Fröbisch et al., 2011

= Cryptovenator =

Cryptovenator Temporal range: Latest Carboniferous, 300 Ma

Extinct genus of synapsids

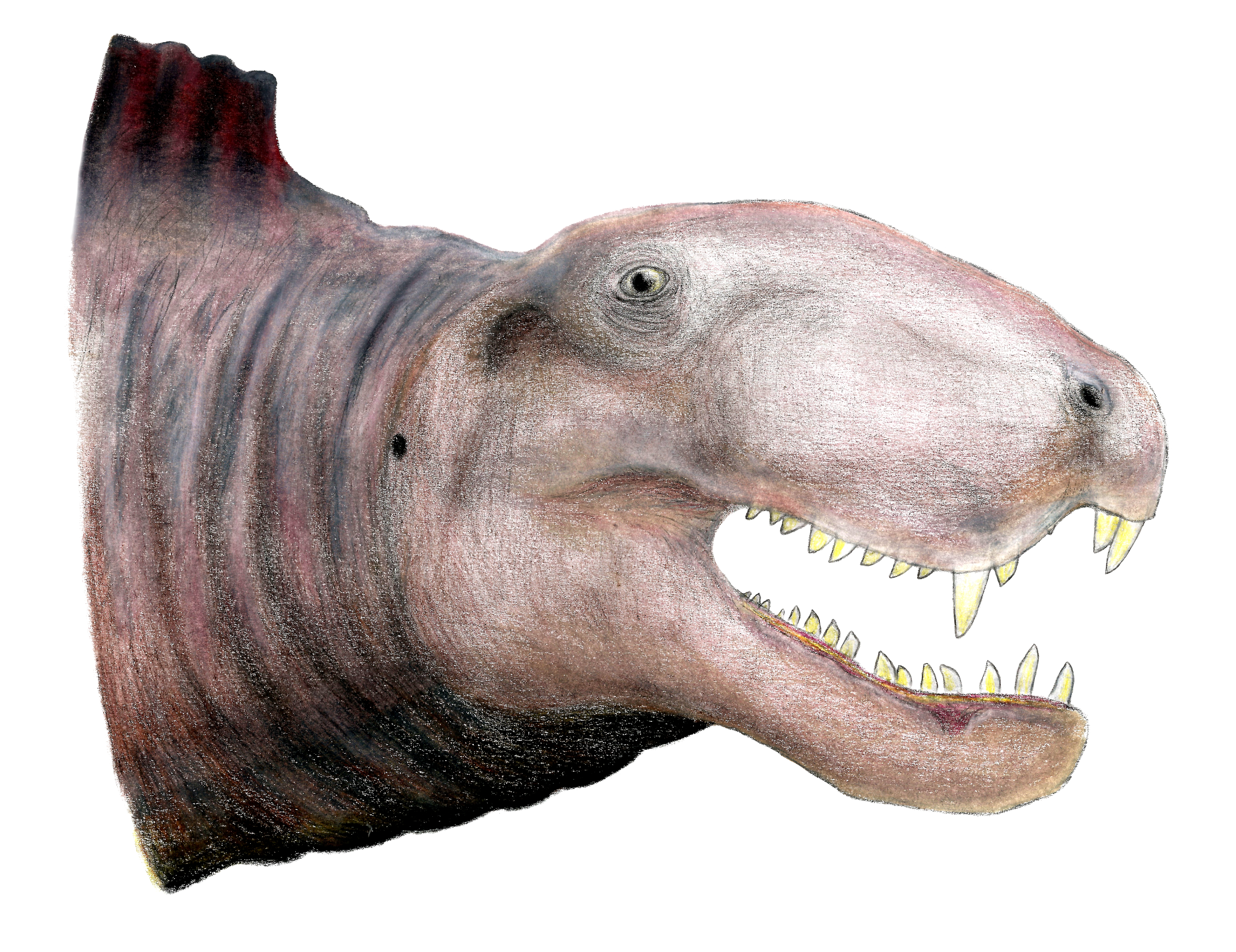
Restoration

Cryptovenator (Crypto, from Greek kryptos (hidden, secret); venator, from Latin (hunter)) is an extinct genus of sphenacodontid "pelycosaur" which existed in Germany during the latest Carboniferous (late Gzhelian age, 300 Ma ± 2.4 Ma). It is known from the holotype LFN−PW 2008/5599−LS, an anterior right mandible fragment, recovered from a dark, fine grained sandstone of the middle Remigiusberg Formation. It was first named by Jörg Fröbisch, Rainer R. Schoch, Johannes Müller, Thomas Schindler and Dieter Schweiss in 2011 and the type species is Cryptovenator hirschbergeri.

== Phylogeny ==
Cladogram after Fröbisch et al., 2011:

- - Edaphosauridae
  - Sphenacodontia
    - Haptodus garnettensis
    - - Palaeohatteria longicaudata
      - Pantelosaurus saxonicus
      - Ianthodon schultzei
      - - Cutleria wilmarthi
        - Sphenacodontoidea
          - Therapsida
          - Sphenacodontidae
            - Secodontosaurus obtusidens
            - - Cryptovenator hirschbergeri
              - - Sphenacodon
                - Ctenospondylus
                - Dimetrodon

== See also ==
- List of pelycosaurs
