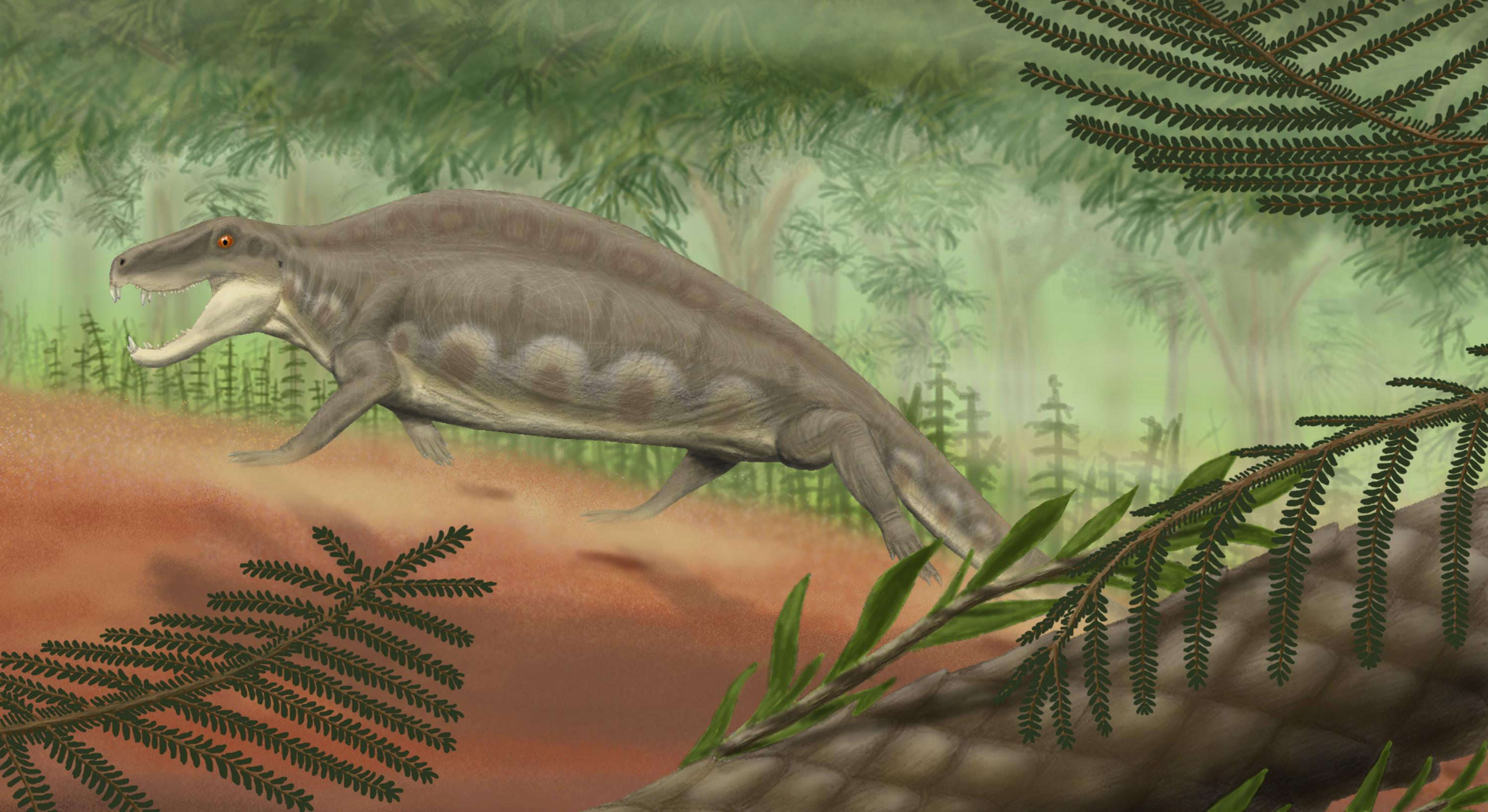

Scientific classification
- Domain: Eukaryota
- Kingdom: Animalia
- Phylum: Chordata
- Clade: Synapsida
- Family: †Sphenacodontidae
- Genus: †Ctenorhachis; Hook & Hotton, 1991

Type species
- †Ctenorhachis jacksoni Hook & Hotton, 1991

= Ctenorhachis =

Ctenorhachis Temporal range: Early Permian, 290.1–279.3 Ma

Extinct genus of synapsids

Ctenorhachis (Greek for "comb spine") is an extinct genus of the family Sphenacodontidae. Ctenorhachis lived in the Early Permian epoch. Ctenorhachis was related to Dimetrodon, but did not belong to the same subfamily as Dimetrodon and Sphenacodon, being a more basal member of Sphenacodontidae. Two specimens are known that have been found from the Wichita Group outcropping in Baylor and Archer counties, north-central Texas. Only the vertebrae and pelvis are known. Articulated vertebrae from the holotype specimen possess blade like neural spines that are greatly enlarged, although not nearly to the extent that can be seen in more derived sphenacodontids such as Dimetrodon and Secodontosaurus, in which they form a large sail. The pelvis is nearly identical to that of Dimetrodon. As suggested in the original description of the genus, Ctenorhachis may represent a short-spined sexual dimorph, although the authors find this unlikely.

== See also ==
- List of pelycosaurs
