= Robledo Mountains =

Mountain range in Doña Ana County, New Mexico

Coordinates: 32°24′17″N 106°54′0″W

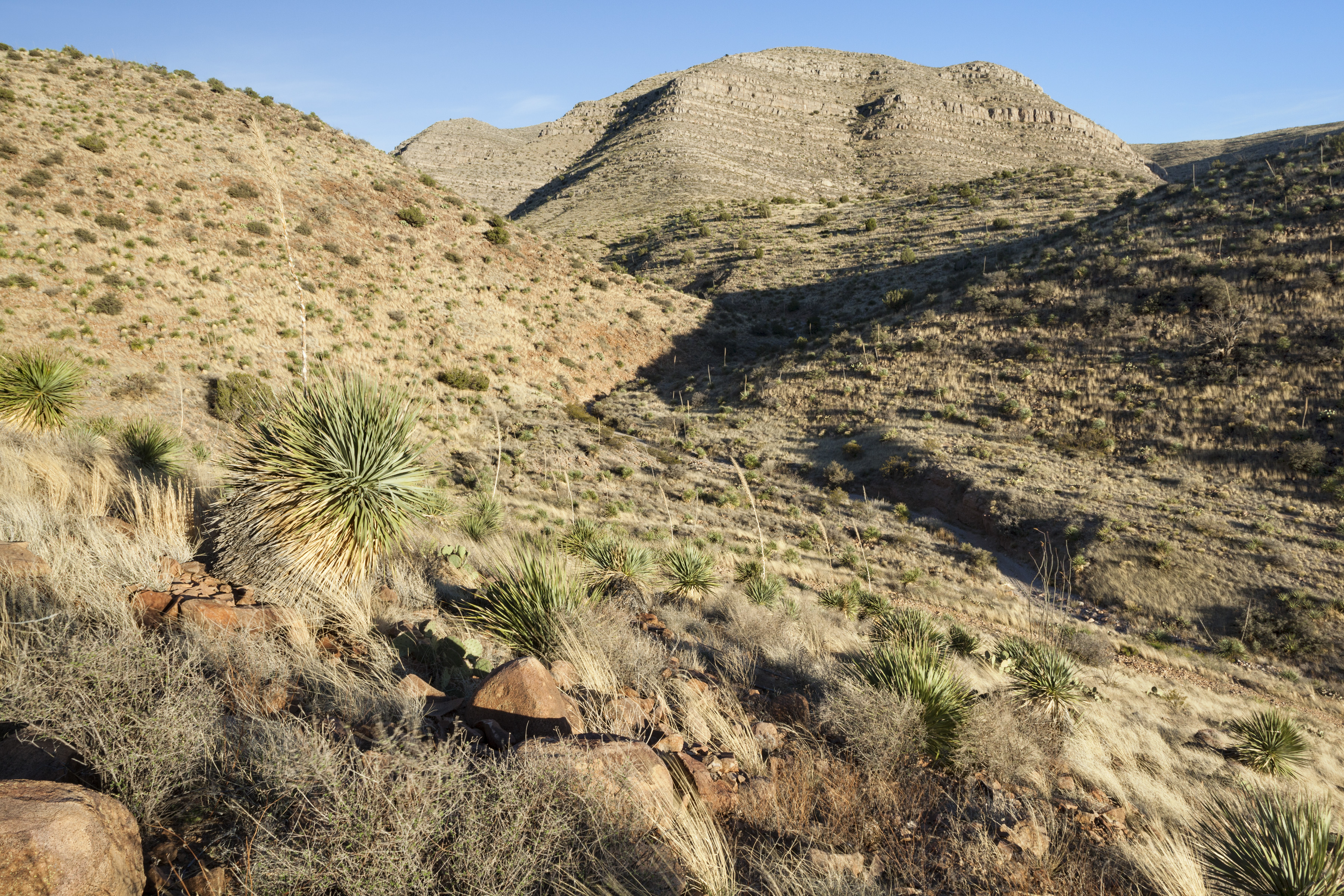
Robledo Mountains, south-southwest of Lookout Peak and northwest of Robledo Mountain

The Robledo Mountains are a mountain range in Doña Ana County, New Mexico, just northwest of Las Cruces. They are an uplifted block of Paleozoic rocks on the west side of the Rio Grande Rift.

The range was named for Pedro Robledo, who died on May 21, 1598, and was buried nearby. Robledo was the first casualty of the Oñate expedition, sent to colonize the upper Rio Grande valley. A native of Toledo, Spain, Robledo was accompanied on the expedition by his wife and five children.

These mountains are home to Early Permian trackways of invertebrates and vertebrates. In 2009, the main locality was designated the 100th active national monument in the United States, and named Prehistoric Trackways National Monument. Rock outcrops in the area preserve numerous examples of early Permian trackways. These trackways include prints of Dimetrodon, Edaphosaurus, Eryops, Cacops and many other small pelycosaurs.

== Wilderness ==
Established in 2019 by the U.S. Congress, the Robledo Mountains Wilderness protects this ecologically diverse portion of the Chihuahuan Desert in New Mexico. The 16,776 acre desert wilderness area contains an assortment of canyons, cliffs, caves, and creeks and is managed by the U.S. Bureau of Land Management.
