= Macromerion =

Macromerion Temporal range: Late Carboniferous, 304.2–299 Ma

Scientific classification
- Kingdom: Animalia
- Phylum: Chordata
- Clade: Synapsida
- Family: †Sphenacodontidae
- Genus: †Macromerion; Fritsch, 1879

Type species
- †Macromerion schwartzenbergii Fritsch, 1885? (Romer, 1945)

Synonyms
- Labyrinthodon schwartzenbergii Fritsch, 1875

Extinct genus of synapsids

Macromerion (Macro- is Greek/Latin for "large") is an extinct genus of non-mammalian synapsids, specifically Pelycosaurs, in the family Sphenacodontidae from Late Carboniferous deposits in the Czech Republic. It was named as a species of Labyrinthodon in 1875 and as its own genus in 1879.

Macromerion was one of the moderate to large-sized Spenacodontids and represented the most dominant terrestrial predators from the Late Carboniferous and Early Permian, which means they lived about 300 million years ago. It is a "sail-backed" synapsid, exhibiting sizable parallel-fibered and fibrolamellar bone, along with lamellar bone. The family of Macromerion, Sphenacodontids, is a sister taxon of Therapsids. The understanding of this relationship plays an important part in understanding the mammalian features of Pelycosaurs and all synapsids. Fossils of this species and other Pelycosaurs were mostly found in regions of North America and Western Europe.

== Geological/paleoenvironmental information ==
Species of Sphenacodontidae were mostly found in North America, with the exception of some species like Macromerion which was found specifically from the Stephanian of Kuonova, Bohemia. Bohemia is now referred to as the westernmost region of the Czech Republic.

This taxon was first found among three other Pelycosaurs in Upper Carboniferous deposits, which shows that it must have originated from Middle Pennsylvanian times. Middle Pennsylvanian is the latter half of two sub periods of the Carboniferous.

During the Carboniferous Period, Bohemia is a part of the major landmass of Laurussia, which was made-up of present-day North America, western Europe through the Urals, and Balto-Scandinavia. Bohemia was towards the mid altitude region of Laurussia, causing the environmental conditions to be warm.

Conditions during the Pennsylvanian times were mostly uniform over large areas and the climate was unvarying and humid. This type of monotonous environment suggests a limit to the number of genera and fauna because variants would not have as much of a chance to develop. The low variability within species is the reason why a majority of Sphenocodontidae are difficult to distinguish from each other. Macromerion does not belong in the same subfamily as Dimetrodon, but the two are very commonly compared and can be confused for each other.

Proof of these tropical and mildly temperate conditions is found in plants from the Carboniferous. The fossils of these plants lack a growth ring, suggesting a uniform climate. Among the European Sphenacodontidae discovered, Macromerion was the oldest in stratigraphic range.

== Historical information and discovery ==
There are not many fossils of this species, but the ones that were discovered, as well as other Pelycosaurs, were mostly found in regions of North America and Western Europe.

This taxon was first found among three other Pelycosaurs in Upper Carboniferous deposits.

There have been up to four mass extinctions recognized in the fossil record of synapsids during the Permian. It is most likely that Macromerion were among the taxa that became extinct during the first of the possible four extinctions.

When a Macromerion fossil was found in Kuonova, it was being compared to the Lower Permian genus Onchiodon due to its jaws. The length of the jaw found indicated a form with the skull length of about 22 cm.

== Description ==
Macromerion was one of the larger sized Spenacodontids and represented the most dominant terrestrial predators of its time. Like other Sphenacodontidae species, Macromerion is "sail-backed", having large parallel-fibered and fibrolamellar bone, as well as lamellar bone. The sail along their back is made up of hyperelongate vertebral neural spinous processes, which at the time was covered with thick skin and blood vessels. A small number of genera of the Sphenocodontidae family lacked this sail on their back, but Macromerion was one that had one. The presence and absence of the sail is due to geographical isolation, but the reason for why one group should or should not evolve the sail is unclear.

The affinities of Sphenacodontidae and other species under this family are distinguished by the shape of the neural spines and proportions of the cervical vertebrae.

Macromerion is recognized within Sphenacodontidae, based mainly on its isolated maxillae. The skull of Macromerion is extended and narrow, which is an adaptation for strong jaw muscles. Their front teeth were assumed to be large while the teeth on the sides of the jaw were much smaller, like the rest of their Sphenacodontidae family was.

Some of the common skull autopomorphies of the Sphenacodontidae clade include a nasal longer than parietal and a narrow posterior process of the postorbital, both being compared to the features of other Synapsids. There is also a contribution of the squamosal to the zygomatic arch, as well as the fact that their ectopterygoid teeth are absent.

== Paleobiology: posture, motion and diet ==
Macromerion have a sprawling posture, as most Pelycosaurs are recognized to have. The large size of Macromerion, especially compared to other Sphenacodontids, suggested that they represented some of the most dominant terrestrial predators of the Late Carboniferous.

== See also ==
- List of pelycosaurs
- Carboniferous
- Laurussia
- Sphenacodontidae
- Dimetrodon
- Synapsid
