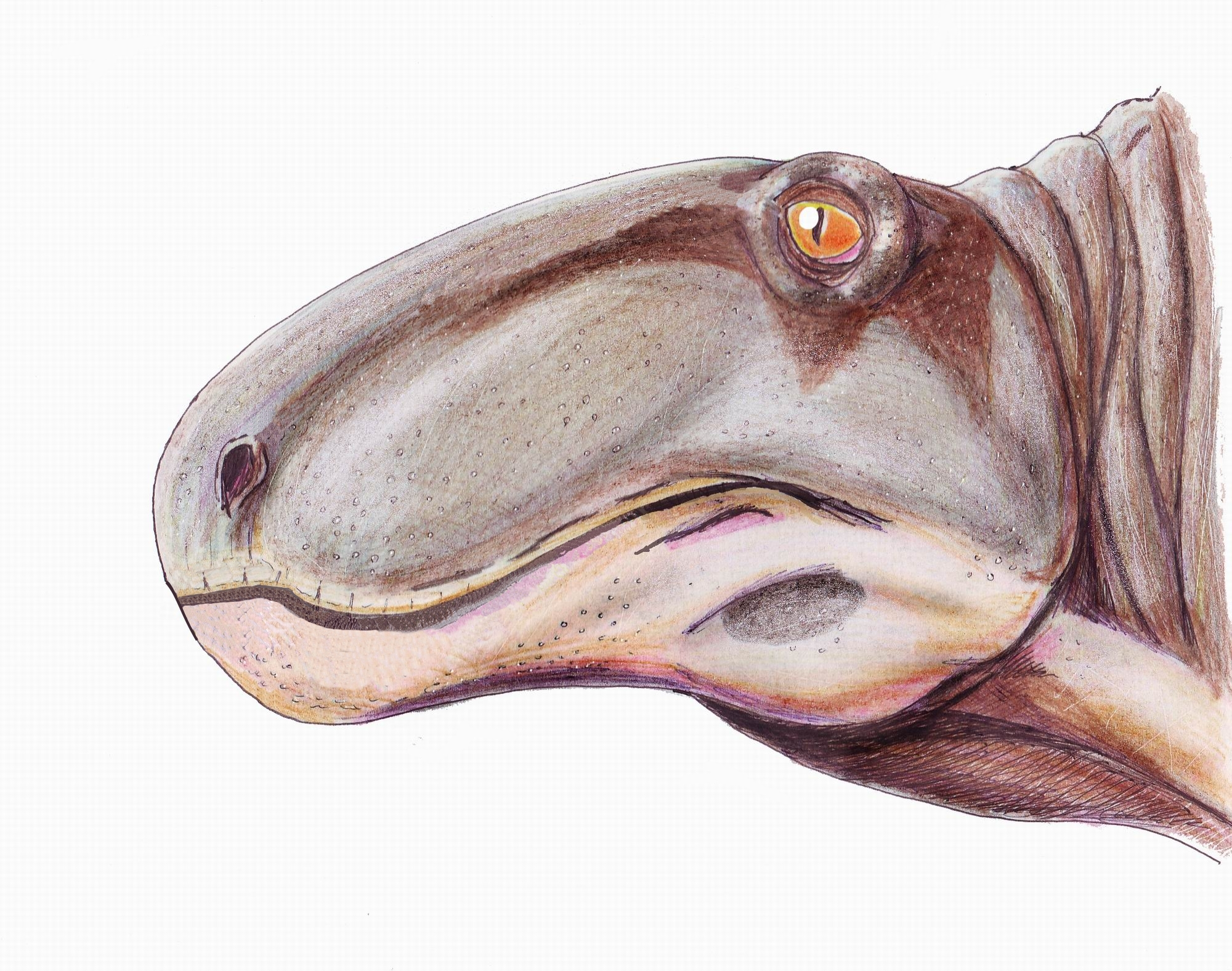

Scientific classification
- Domain: Eukaryota
- Kingdom: Animalia
- Phylum: Chordata
- Clade: Synapsida
- Family: †Sphenacodontidae
- Genus: †Steppesaurus; Olson & Beerbower, 1953
- Species: †S. gurleyi

Binomial name
- †Steppesaurus gurleyi Olson & Beerbower, 1953

= Steppesaurus =

Steppesaurus Temporal range: Late Permian, Wuchiapingian

Extinct genus of synapsids

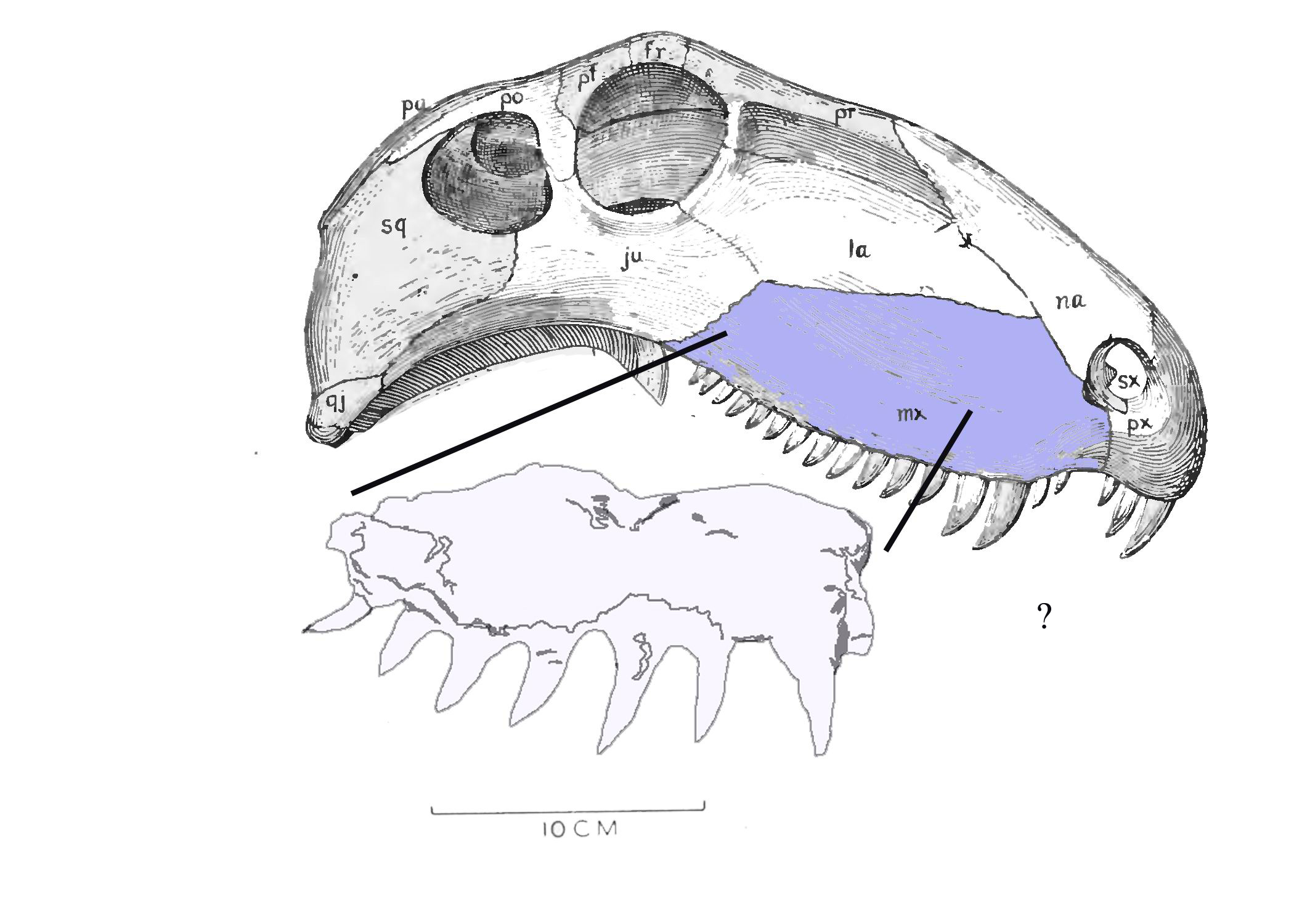
Outline of Steppesaurus maxilla with skull of Sphenacodon for comparison, showing that the latter had more teeth in a given stretch of upper jaw

Steppesaurus is an extinct genus of basal Eupelycosauria belonging to the Sphenacodontidae, related to Dimetrodon and Sphenacodon, from the Late Permian San Angelo Formation of Texas.

== Discovery and naming ==
A maxilla and dentary, holotype FMNH UR 148, were at the Pease River found by Everett Claire Olson in 1950, who named the genus in 1953, together with James R. Beerbower, after J. Steppe who had assisted in the excavation.

== Description ==
The body length of Steppesaurus has been estimated as high as eighteen feet, making it the largest known sphenacodontid, but this failed to take into account that its teeth, as restored, were more widely spaced. It likely had less teeth in its maxilla, which as a whole was not particularly large.

== Classification ==
Olson in 1953 placed Steppesaurus in the Sphenacodontidae but in 1962 changed this to the Phthinosuchidae, making it a member of the Therapsida, as support for his hypothesis that these had been found in the Early Permian. This has proven to be very controversial.

== See also ==
- List of therapsids
