= Wood auger =

Drilling device or bit

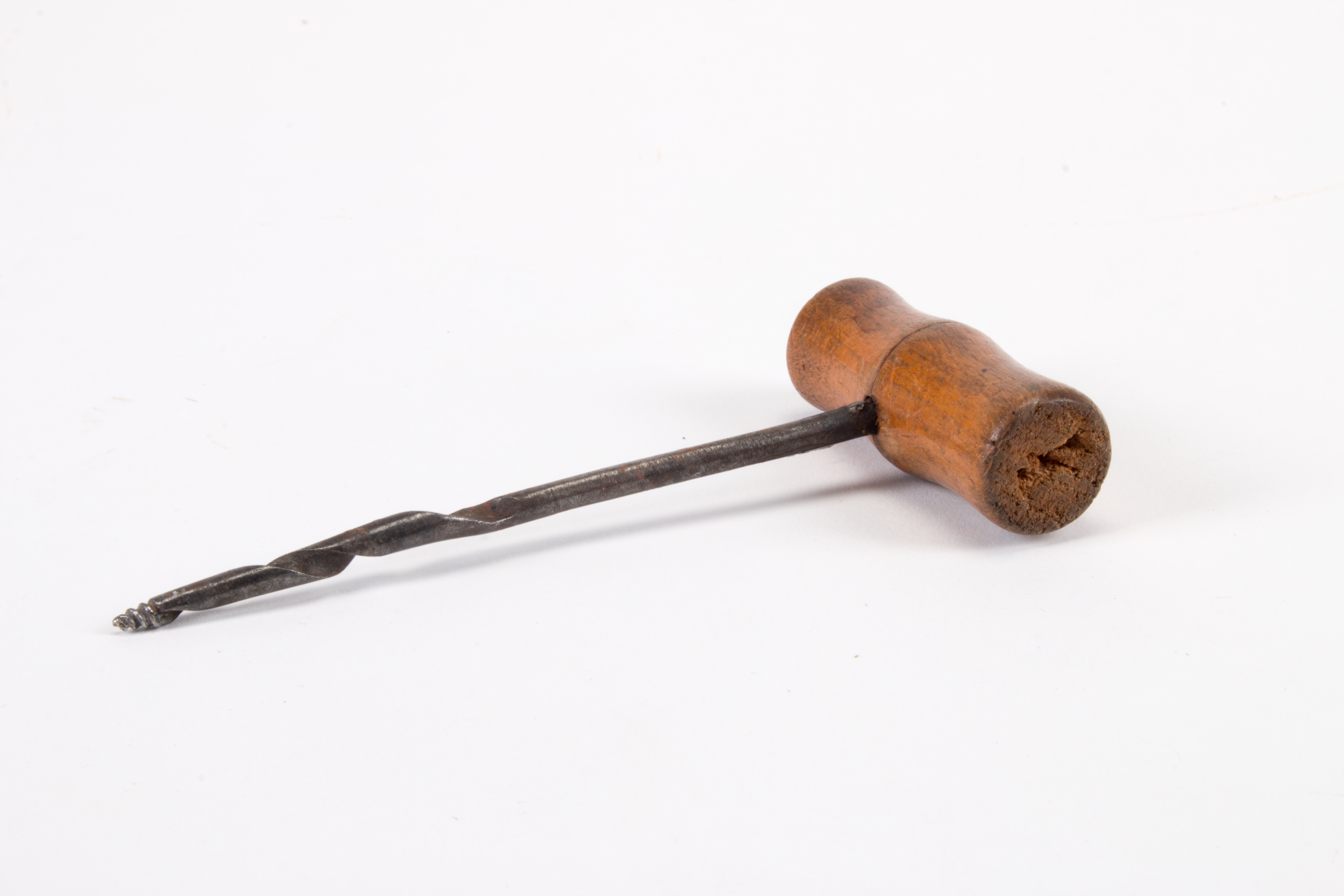
Small twist auger, also called a Gimlet, with wood handle

An auger is a device to drill wood or other materials, consisting of a rotating metal shaft with a blade at the end that scrapes or cuts the wood.

== Types ==
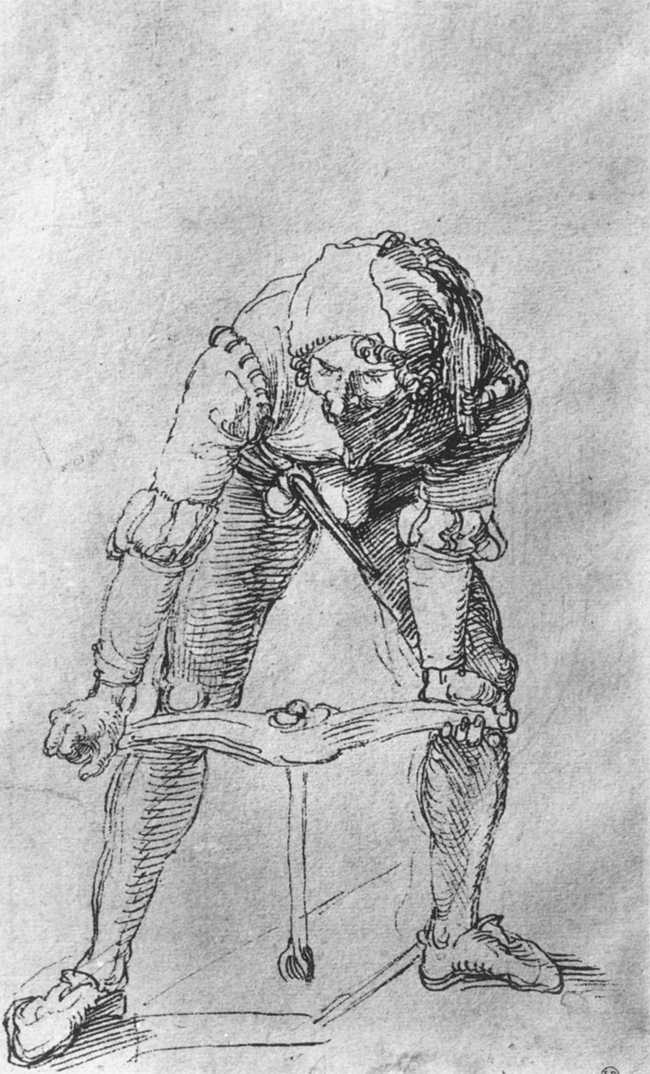
Study of a man using an auger, from The Seven Sorrows of the Virgin, by Albrecht Dürer, c. 1496.

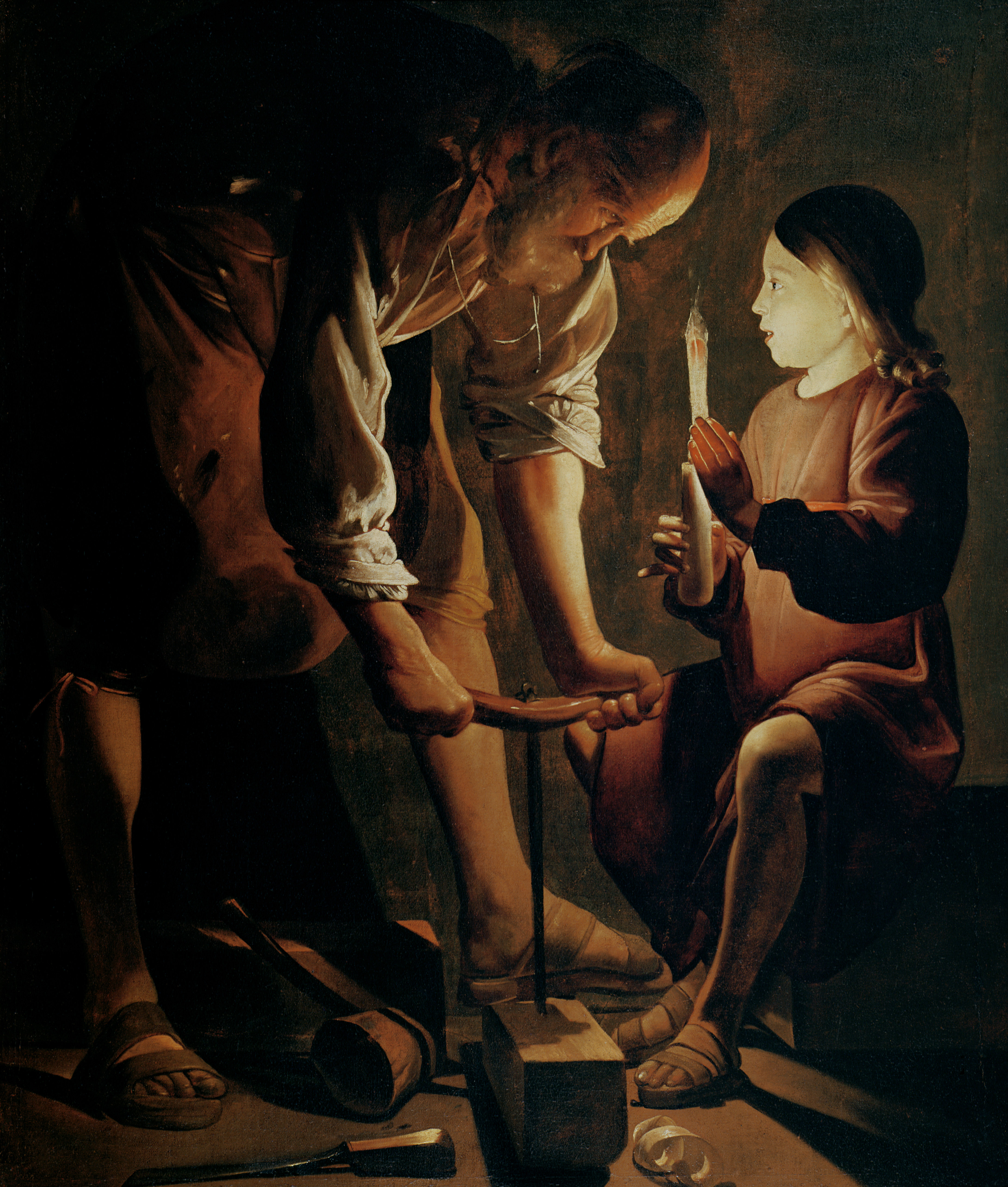
Painting by Georges de La Tour of St. Joseph operating an auger.

The classical design has a helical screw blade winding around the bottom end of the shaft. The lower edge of the blade is sharpened and scrapes the wood; the rest of the blade lifts the chips out of the way. It is powered with two hands, by a T-shaped handle attached to the top of the shaft.

More modern versions have elaborated auger bits with multiple blades in various positions. Modern versions also have different means to drive the shaft, resulting in various tools such as braces, wheel drills (the "eggbeater" drill), and power drills.

== See also ==
- Augerino
- Gimlet
