= Augerinoichnus =

Augerinoichnus Temporal range: Permian

Trace fossil classification
- Ichnogenus: †Augerinoichnus; Miner et al. 2008

Ichnospecies
- A. helicoidalis Miner et al. 2008

Ichnogenus of trace fossil

Augerinoichnus (‘Augerino trace’) is a Permian trace fossil that has been found in New Mexico, US.

The trace fossil is a corkscrew-shaped burrow that, when partially eroded out at the surface, has the appearance of a set of horseshoe-shaped imprints. It takes its name from the augerino, a troublesome wormlike creature in New Mexico farming folklore that burrows into and drains irrigation ditches. The ichnogenus is unusual in being found in a tidal flat environment; most fossil burrows are characteristic of deeper water.
