= Augerino =

Legendary creature in US lumberjack and ranching folktales

The augerino is a legendary creature present in the folk tales of lumberjack and ranching communities in the western United States. Tales of the augerino described it as a subterranean creature which inhabited the drier regions of Colorado. The augerino required a dry environment to survive and would bore holes in dams and irrigation ditches to let the water drain out. Some accounts described the augerino as a type of worm, though tales differ on the exact physical description of the creature. The name appears to derive from the diminutive of the common hand tool, the auger.

A 1941 investigation of the folk tales of Middle Park, Colorado uncovered stories of the augerino describing it as a gigantic, corkscrew-shaped, indestructible wormlike creature which lined its burrows with a silica substance to keep them from collapsing. Some residents apparently believed the creature was authentic, remarking, "Hell, the ditches still leak, don't they?" Folklorist Ronald L. Ives suggested that genuine belief in the creature may have come from misinterpretations of paleontological finds; excavated specimens of the snail laxispira were sometimes known as "Devil's corkscrews" or "fossil augerinos". Ives had also published a fictional short story based on tales of the augerino in 1938. In 2008, a new helical fossil found in New Mexico was named Augerinoichnus helicoidalis in honor of the augerino.

== See also ==
- Palaeocastor
