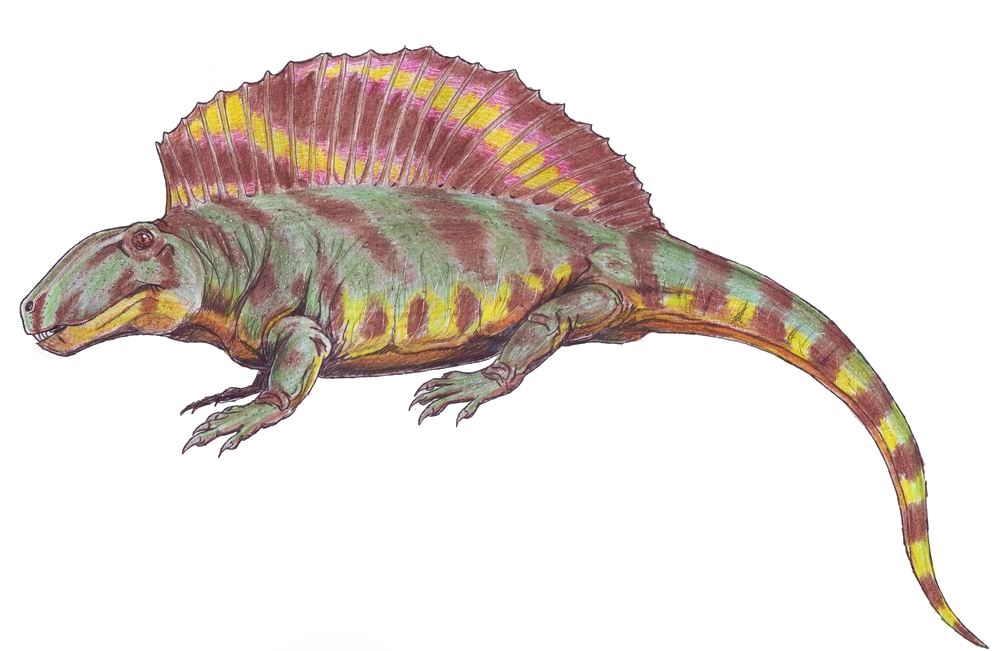
- Life restoration of C. casei

Scientific classification
- Domain: Eukaryota
- Kingdom: Animalia
- Phylum: Chordata
- Clade: Synapsida
- Family: †Sphenacodontidae
- Subfamily: †Sphenacodontinae
- Genus: †Ctenospondylus; Romer, 1936

Species
- †C. casei Romer, 1936; †C. ninevehensis Berman, 1978

= Ctenospondylus =

Ctenospondylus Temporal range: Early Permian, Artinskian–Kungurian

Extinct genus of synapsids

Ctenospondylus ("comb vertebra") is an extinct genus of sphenacodontid synapsid.

Species were about three meters (10 ft) long. The genus is known only from the 'Seymouran' Land Vertebrate Faunachron, which is equivalent to the upper part of the Artinskian stage and the lowermost Kungurian stage of the Early Permian. Its fossils were found in the U.S. states of Ohio and Texas. It was a carnivore and preyed upon animals close to its size. Ctenospondylus had a long tail, short back spines, and a very deep yet narrow skull with massive jaws that had sharp teeth. Because of its large size, it was probably the apex predator in its environment, and might have competed with other predators like Dimetrodon for food. A sphenacodontid, it was a close relative of Dimetrodon.

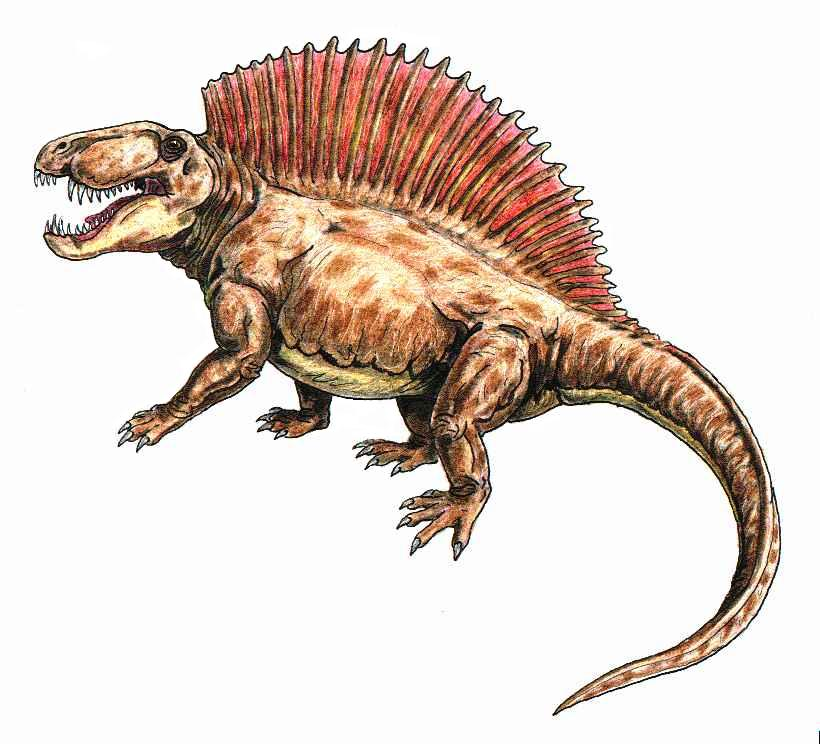
Life restoration of C. casei.

In 1936, Alfred Sherwood Romer named the type species Ctenospondylus casei. The generic name, from Greek κτείς, kteis, "comb", and σφόνδυλος, sphondylos, "vertebra", referred to the form of the back sail. The specific name honoured Ermine Cowles Case, who first reported the type specimen in 1910. The fossil had been found in Archer County at the Slippery Creek site in the Belle Plains Formation, dating from the Artinskian. The holotype is AMNH 4047, already found in 1881 by William Fletcher Cummins, collecting for Edward Drinker Cope. It consists of a neck vertebra, two back vertebrae, two broken off spines and rib fragments. In 1964, far more complete material from Utah and Arizona was referred to the species by Peter P. Vaughn. This included specimen NTM VP 1001: a partial skeleton with skull; NTM VP 10014: a number of back vertebrae; NTM VP 10015: additional back vertebrae; NTM VP 10016: two skull bones; and NTM VP 10017: a series of three back vertebrae. The specimens are part of the collection of the Navajo Tribal Museum.

In 1978, David Berman named a second species: Ctenospondylus ninevehensis. The specific name refers to the Niniveh Limestone Member of the Greene Formation, dating from the Sakmarian where it was found at Clark Hill in Monroe County, Ohio. The holotype is specimen MCZ 3386, found by Donald Baird in June 1955. It consists of a partial skeleton with fragmentary skull, a spine from the axis, four back vertebrae, four tail vertebrae, neck ribs, dorsal ribs, a shoulder blade, two humeri, and the right pelvis. Specimen MCZ 4458, a right maxilla, was referred to the species. Berman considered C. ninevehensis more basal than Ctenospondylus casei and only referred the second species to the genus because of the similar spine length. Later specimen MCZ 8635-42 was referred, a skull; MCZ 8665, a jugal bone and MCZ 3102, a skeleton with skull.

The spines of Ctenospondylus are longer than those of Sphenacodon but shorter than those of Dimetrodon. They also lack the dumbbell-shaped upper profile of the latter genus and are more transversely flattened. The skull of Ctenospondylus is, as far as can be judged from the limited material found, very similar to that of other sphenacodontids.

== See also ==
- List of pelycosaurs
