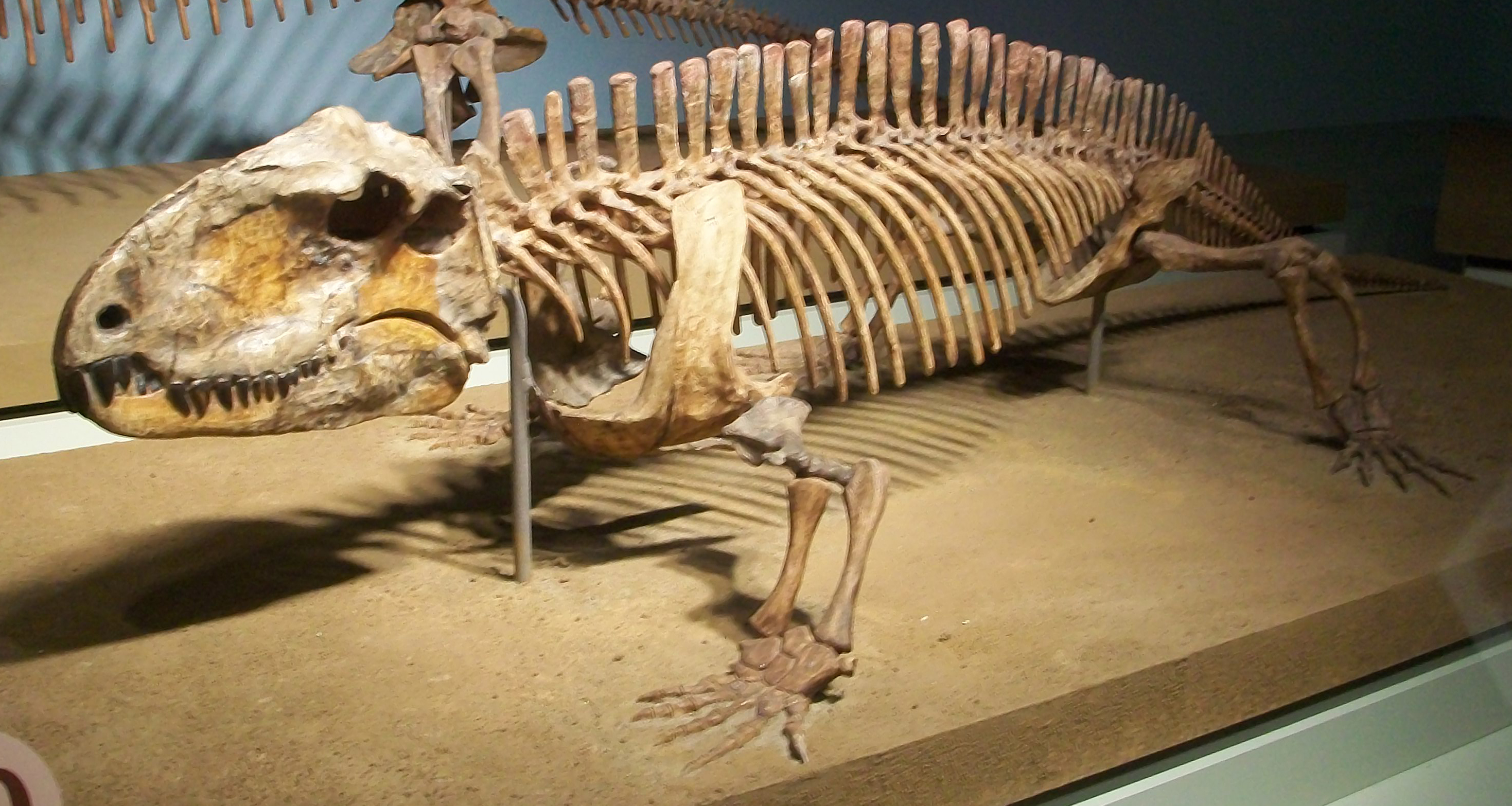
- Skeleton of Sphenacodon ferox in the Field Museum of Natural History

Scientific classification
- Kingdom: Animalia
- Phylum: Chordata
- Clade: Synapsida
- Family: †Sphenacodontidae
- Subfamily: †Sphenacodontinae
- Genus: †Sphenacodon; Marsh, 1878

Species
- †S. ferox Marsh, 1878 (type); †S. ferocior Romer, 1937; †S.(?) britannicus (Huene, 1908)

Synonyms
- Elcabrosaurus Case, 1907; Scoliomus Williston and Case, 1913

= Sphenacodon =

Sphenacodon Temporal range: Pennsylvanian to Cisuralian (Gzhelian to Kungurian), 300–280 Ma

Extinct genus of synapsids

Sphenacodon (meaning "wedge point tooth") is an extinct genus of synapsid that lived from about 300 to about 280 million years ago (Ma) during the Late Carboniferous and Early Permian periods. Like the closely related Dimetrodon, Sphenacodon was a carnivorous member of the Eupelycosauria family Sphenacodontidae. However, Sphenacodon had a low crest along its back, formed from blade-like bones on its vertebrae (neural spines) instead of the tall dorsal sail found in Dimetrodon. Fossils of Sphenacodon are known from New Mexico and the Utah–Arizona border region in North America.

Researchers currently recognize two species: Sphenacodon ferox (the type species) and Sphenacodon ferocior. Sphenacodon ferocior can be up to 40% larger in overall size (at about 3 m [9.8 ft] long) compared to Sphenacodon ferox (at about 2 m [6.6 ft]). In addition, the dorsal spines in Sphenacodon ferocior are proportionately 45% taller than in Sphenacodon ferox. The recent discovery of a nearly complete skull of Sphenacodon ferox has helped clarify other distinctions between the two species, including the number of teeth in certain parts of the jaws and the size of the indented notch between the maxillary and premaxillary bones in the upper jaw. The two species occur together in some formations, but Sphenacodon ferox apparently survived later into the Early Permian.

Sphenacodon and Dimetrodon typically have been found in different geographical areas that were separated by the ancient Hueco Seaway that penetrated equatorial Pangaea during the Early Permian and "covered much of southern New Mexico and parts of West Texas". Sphenacodon is known from the west in New Mexico, Arizona, and Utah, and Dimetrodon is known mainly from the east in Texas and Oklahoma in more deltaic environments. However, the species Dimetrodon occidentalis is found in New Mexico. Each genus would have been an apex land predator in its region and likely preyed on amphibians, diadectids, and early synapsids and diapsids. Sphenacodon appears to have died out before about 280 million years ago during the Wolfcampian. The genus Dimetrodon survived until about 270 million years ago. Such large sphenacodontid predators were later replaced by therapsids, the group of synapsids that includes the direct ancestors of mammals.

== Description ==
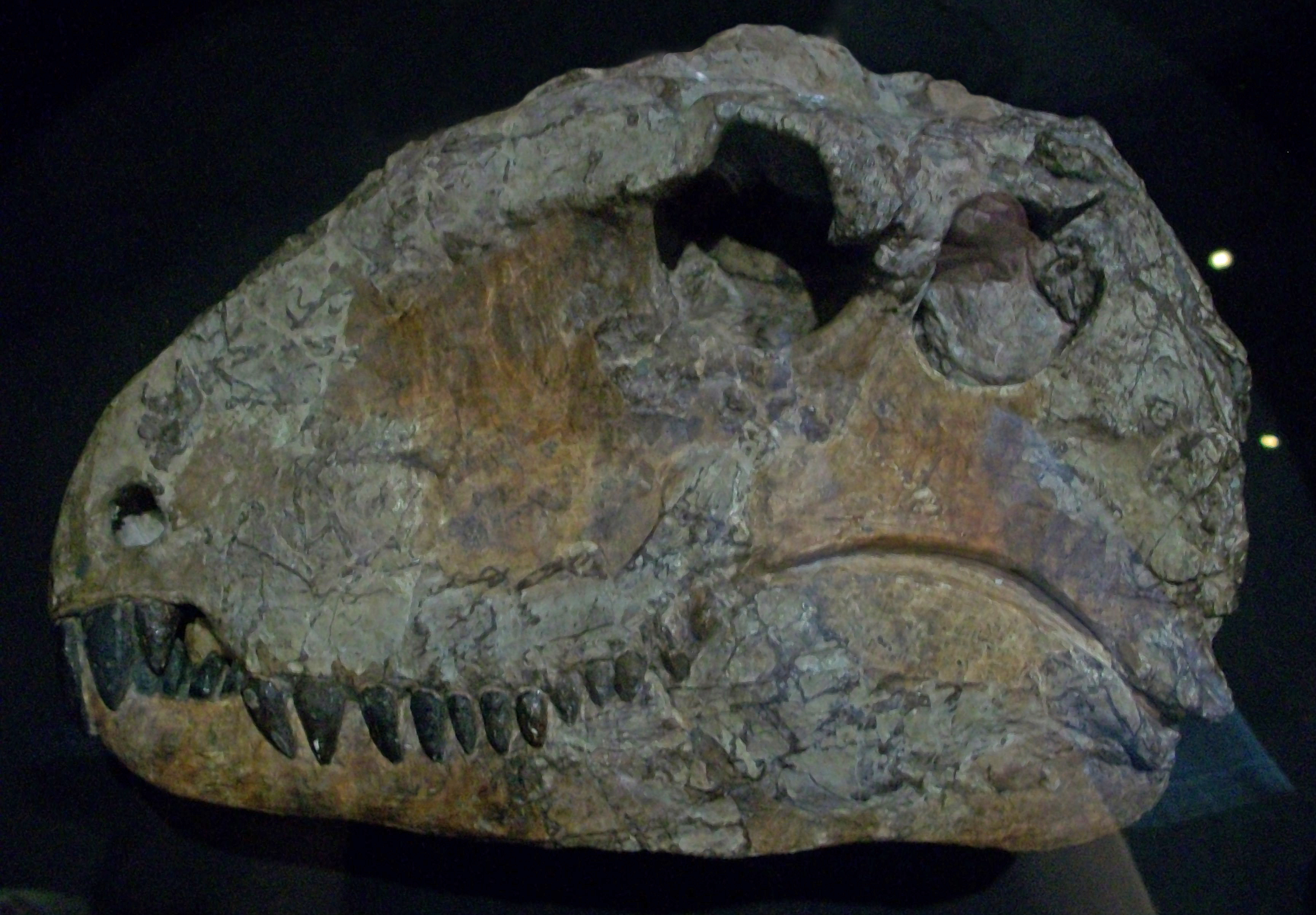
Heavily restored skull of S. ferox in the Field Museum

The skull of Sphenacodon is very similar to that of Dimetrodon. It is narrow from side to side and vertically deep, with an indented notch at the front of the maxillary bone in the upper jaw. The upper and lower jaws are equipped with an array of powerful teeth, divided into sharp pointed "incisors" [precaniniforms], large stabbing "canines" [caniniforms], and smaller slicing back teeth [postcaniniforms]. The orbit is set high and far back with a single opening (temporal fenestra) behind and partly below the eye, a characteristic of synapsids.

Body proportions are also similar to Dimetrodon, with a very large head, short neck, robust trunk, relatively short front and hind limbs, and a tapering tail that makes up about half the animal's entire length. However, the tops of the neural spines along the back bone are strikingly different in each genus. In Dimetrodon, the neural spines develop into long, narrow, cylindrical projections that support a tall vertical dorsal sail that ends near the base of the tail. In Sphenacodon, the neural spines are enlarged but retain a flat-tipped, blade-like shape along the back and tail, and form a crest rather than a tall sail. (The sphenacodontid genus Ctenospondylus also has blade-like neural spines, but its dorsal crest is taller than in Sphenacodon, although not as tall as the sail in Dimetrodon.)

There is evidence for strong epaxial muscles along the base of the raised neural spines in both Sphenacodon and Dimetrodon, likely helping to stiffen and strengthen the backbone for walking and for lunging at prey by restricting side-to-side flexing motion. A recent study of the structure of the neural spines on Sphenacodon confirms that the upper parts were not encased in a thick muscular hump and instead protruded above a layer of muscle to form a low dorsal crest. Finds of sphenacodontid specimens in which postmortem distortion of the body caused the dorsal spines to overlap suggests that the spines were not connected by hard or particularly tough tissue. The possible function of a low, skin-covered crest in Sphenacodon is debated. A thermoregulatory role seems unlikely, although the taller crest in Sphenacodon ferocior is allometrically larger than in S. ferox. Recent research has favored a display role for the tall sails in Dimetrodon and Edaphosaurus.

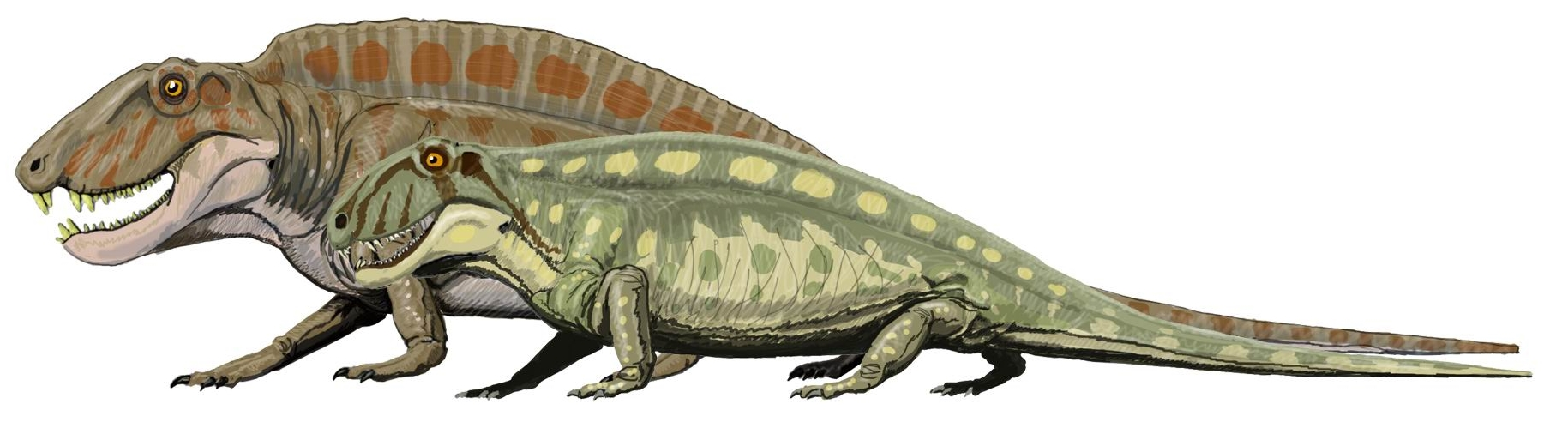
Size comparisons of species Sphenacodon ferox and larger Sphenacodon ferocior.

Both Sphenacodon and Dimetrodon have been depicted with their short limbs splayed outward at 90 degrees from the body in a wide pushup position and with the tail (and even belly) dragging on the ground, similar to modern lizards and crocodiles. A sprawling stance is also typical for Sphenacodon and Dimetrodon skeletons as currently mounted in museums. However, trackways called Dimetropus ("Dimetrodon foot") that match the foot configuration of large sphenacodontids show animals walking with their limbs brought under the body for a narrow, semi-erect gait without tail or belly drag marks. Such clear evidence for a more efficient upright posture suggests that important details about the anatomy and locomotion of Sphenacodon and Dimetrodon may not be fully understood. Some well preserved narrow Dimetropus tracks found in parts of the Prehistoric Trackways National Monument in New Mexico match the smaller size of Sphenacodon, a genus known from skeletal fossils in the state, but could also come from a small Dimetrodon.

== Discovery and classification ==
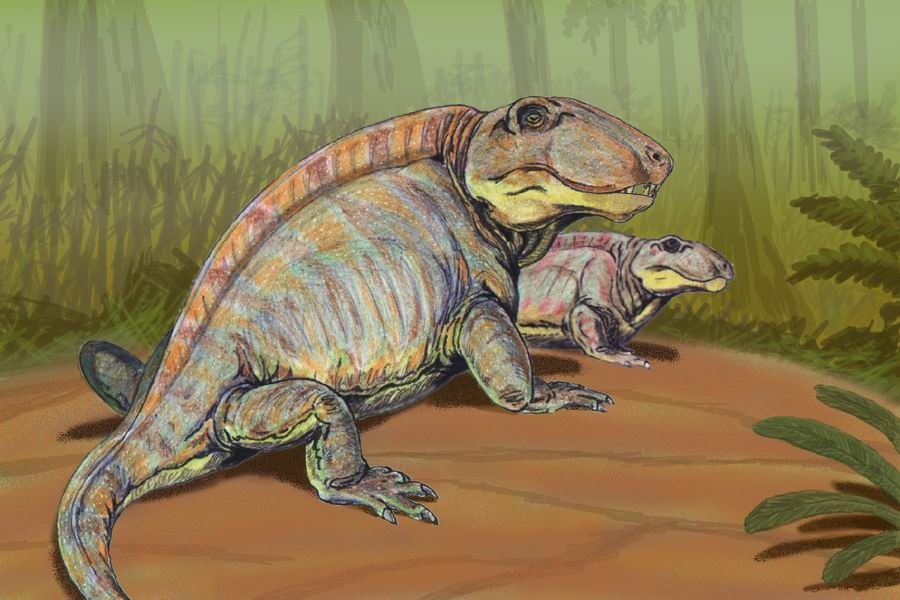
Restoration of two specimens

The American paleontologist O. C. Marsh named Sphenacodon (from Greek sphen "wedge" + ake "point" + odous (-odon) "tooth") in 1878, based on part of a lower jaw (dentary) bone found in the redbeds of northern New Mexico by fossil collector David Baldwin. In his very short description of the jaw, Marsh cited the back teeth as characteristic ("crowns are much compressed, and have very sharp cutting edges without crenulations") and assessed the animal as "about six feet in length, and carnivorous in habit," although the rest of the skeleton was not known. He did not provide an illustration of the specimen. Marsh gave the genus the Latin specific name ferox "fierce" and erected the new family Sphenacodontidae, placed under the primitive reptilian order "Rhynchocephala" (=Rhynchocephalia), then including nearly all groups of early reptiles in addition to the living tuatara.

Other paleontologists overlooked Marsh's brief mention of Sphenacodon for almost three decades. In the meantime, the sail-backed Dimetrodon, named in 1878 by rival paleontologist Edward Drinker Cope, became a scientifically important genus, known from numerous fossils. Recognition of Sphenacodon as a low-spined carnivorous "pelycosaur" distinct from Dimetrodon came in the early 20th century with the discovery of more fossils in New Mexico. The proposed taxa Elcabrosaurus baldwini Case, 1907 and Scoliomus Williston and Case, 1913 now are considered junior synonyms of Sphenacodon ferox.

In 1937, Alfred Sherwood Romer described a second species from New Mexico named Sphenacodon ferocior ("fiercer") that was larger and more robust, with proportionately longer neural spines. Romer and Price (1940) provided detailed descriptions of both ferox and ferocior with skeletal reconstructions.

A third species, Sphenacodon britannicus, has sometimes been cited in the literature. In 1908 German paleontologist F. von Huene described Oxyodon britannicus, based on part of a maxilla found in England, (The generic name Oxyodon is preoccupied by a fish (Oxyodon Baur, 1906) and so is invalid.) The specimen had been identified earlier as a possible Triassic dinosaur, but von Huene recognized a "pelycosaur." Paton transferred the species to Sphenacodon in 1974, noting it would have been an animal about the size of Sphenacodon ferox. However, more recent studies have questioned whether such limited fossil material can be used to distinguish between Dimetrodon and Sphenacodon—or its own genus. The species "Oxyodon" britannicus (or as Sphenacodon (?) britannicus) is now generally classified as Sphenacodontidae incertae sedis (of uncertain placement).

Sphenacodon in a cladogram after Fröbisch et al., 2011:

- - Edaphosauridae
  - Sphenacodontia
    - Haptodus garnettensis
    - - Palaeohatteria longicaudata
      - Pantelosaurus saxonicus
      - Ianthodon schultzei
      - - Cutleria wilmarthi
        - Sphenacodontoidea
          - Therapsida
          - Sphenacodontidae
            - Secodontosaurus obtusidens
            - - Cryptovenator hirschbergeri
              - - Sphenacodon
                - Ctenospondylus
                - Dimetrodon

== See also ==
- List of pelycosaurs
- Edaphosaurus
- Haptodus
