= Serpentichnus =

Serpentichnus Temporal range: Permian

Trace fossil classification
- Domain: Eukaryota
- Kingdom: Animalia
- Phylum: Chordata
- Order: †Lysorophia
- Ichnogenus: †Serpentichnus; Braddy et al. 2003

Ichnospecies
- S. robledoensis Braddy et al. 2003; S. sigmoidalis Braddy et al. 2003

Ichnogenus of trace fossil

Serpentichnus (‘snake-like trace’) is a possible Permian trace fossil found in New Mexico, US. It takes the form of foot imprints separated by discontinuous groves interpreted as body imprints. It is attributed to early amphibians (Lysorophia) swimming near the bottom of a shallow body of water with a motion like that of a sidewinding snake.

The interpretation of these marks as a trace fossil is controversial. The marks have also been interpreted as tool marks, formed by a rotating piece of debris that periodically scratched the bottom of a flowing body of water.
