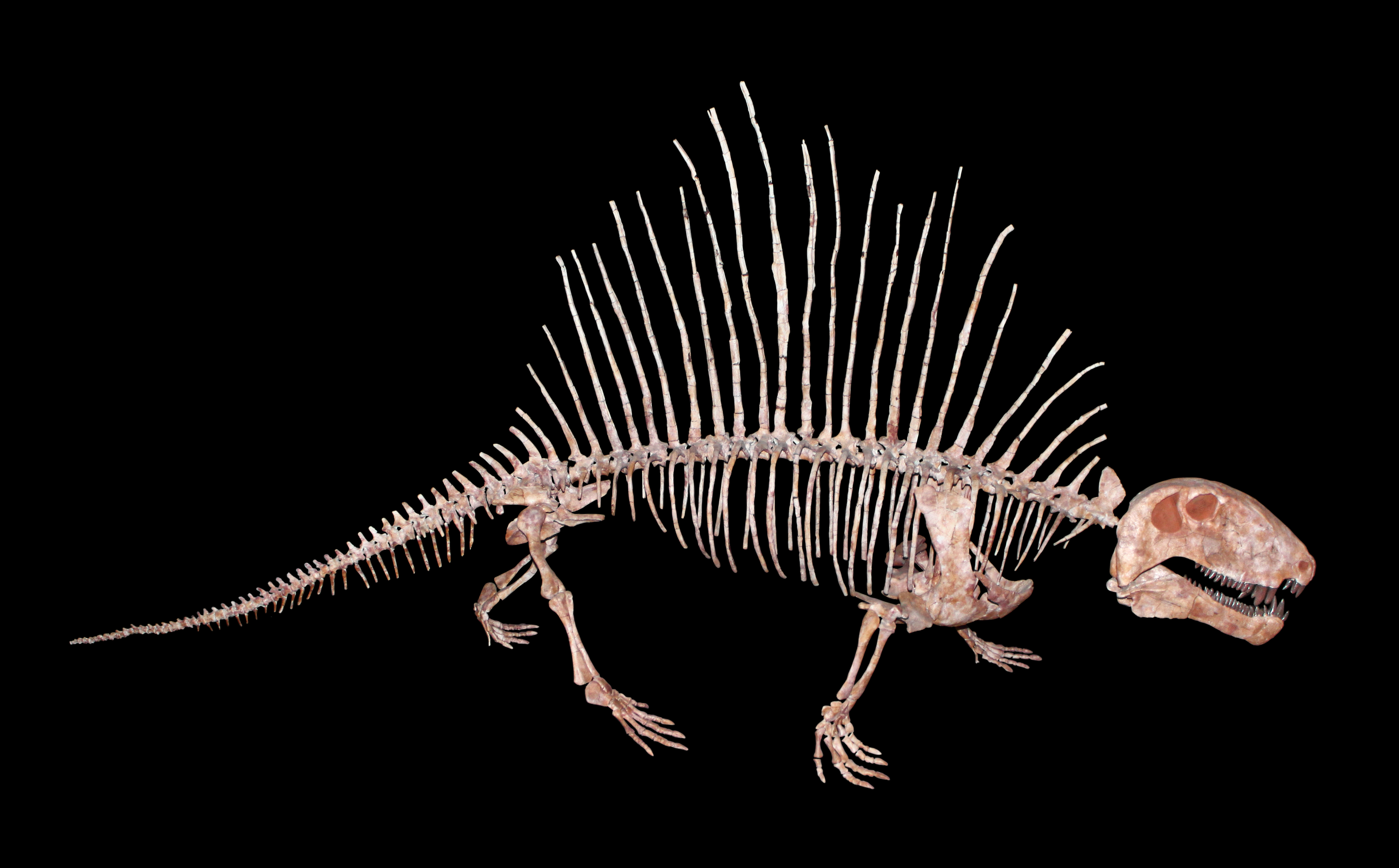
- Dimetrodon limbatus skeleton

Scientific classification
- Kingdom: Animalia
- Phylum: Chordata
- Clade: Synapsida
- Clade: Sphenacodontoidea
- Family: †Sphenacodontidae; Marsh, 1878

Genera & clades
- Ctenorhachis; Cutleria; Macromerion; Neosaurus; Secodontosaurus; Steppesaurus?; Tetraceratops?; Sphenacodontinae; Cryptovenator; Ctenospondylus; Dimetrodon; Sphenacodon

= Sphenacodontidae =

Sphenacodontidae Temporal range: Pennsylvanian - Guadalupian, 300–272 Ma

Extinct family of synapsids

Sphenacodontidae (Greek: "wedge point tooth") is an extinct family of carnivorous sphenacodontian synapsids, known from the latest Carboniferous (or earliest Permian) to the early Middle Permian. Primitive forms were generally small (60 cm to 1 meter), but during the later part of the early Permian these animals grew progressively larger (up to 3 meters or more), to become the apex predators of terrestrial environments. Sphenacodontid fossils are so far known only from North America and Europe, and possibly South America.

== Characteristics ==
Skull of Dimetrodon

Sphenacodontidae is characterised by a number of features of the skull, including the forward facing (anterior) process (extension) of the frontal bone is narrower than the posterior process, the postorbital bone and squamosal bone have a large bordering area of contact, the supratemporal bone has a contacting border with the postorbital, the paroccipital process extends downwards and outwards (ventrolaterally) as well as posteriorly, and the root of the caniniform tooth bulges to constrict the opening of the choanae (the opening of the nasal cavity in the roof of the mouth).

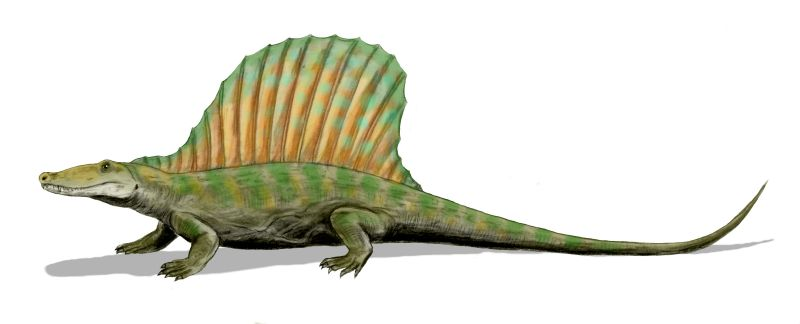
Life restoration of Secodontosaurus

Members of Sphenacodontidae generally had physically massive skulls with deep jaws and robust, tall snouts, though the skull of Secodontosaurus is unlike other sphenacodontids considerably elongate. They had strongly varying sizes of teeth depending on position in the jaw (heterodonty), with the teeth at the front of the jaws on the premaxilla and towards the front of the maxilla and the dentary being particularly enlarged compared to the other teeth. These teeth were narrow (compressed) from side to side (laterally/labio-lingually), the forward (mesial) and posterior (distal) edges of these teeth had sharp carinae (raised edges), which in some members evolved into true serration. There were large attachment areas for adductor muscles that closed the jaws, which in combination with the palatal teeth on the roof of the mouth, aided in firmly gripping writhing prey.

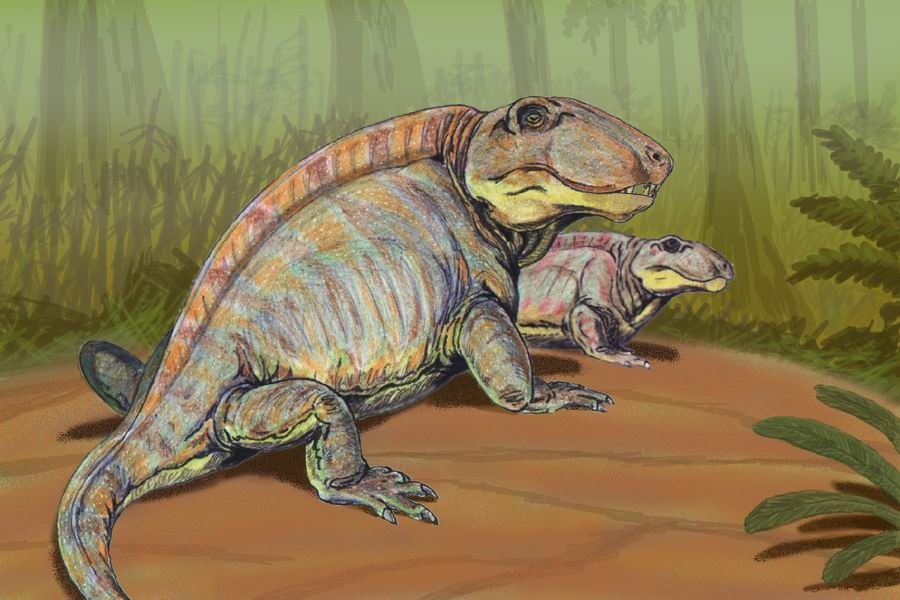
Restoration of two individuals of Sphenacodon

Members of the group show a general trend of size increase over time, becoming the first large fully terrestrial apex predators during the Early Permian, with some species of Dimetrodon reaching a total body length of 4.6 metres (15 ft). Several large and advanced members of this group (Ctenospondylus, Sphenacodon, Secodontosaurus and Dimetrodon) are distinguished by a neural spine sail along the back, made up of elongated vertebral neural spines (extremely so in Dimetrodon and Secodontosaurus), which in life must have been covered with skin and blood vessels. The function of the sail is unknown. Thermoregulation has been proposed as a primary function, though the evidence behind this has been questioned. Display for sexual selection has also been proposed.

Due to the scarcity of evidence, there is ambiguity surrounding the appearance and evolution of non-mammalian synapsid integument. Skin impressions from resting trace fossils from Early Permian of Germany from a sphenacodontid described in 2025 revealed they were covered in epidermal scales similar to those of living reptiles, rather than leathery scaleless skin or hair, with the trace indicating the underside of the body and tail of the sphenacodontid (likely Dimetrodon teutonis) were covered in rectangular scales, while the limbs were covered in hexagonal scales.

== Classification and evolution ==
The earliest sphenacodontids appeared during the latest Carboniferous or earliest Permian around 300 million years ago. They were dominant predators in terrestrial ecosystems for the entire Early Permian, a period of 25 million years. The most recent sphenacodontid, Dimetrodon angelensis, is from the latest Kungurian or, more likely, early Roadian San Angelo Formation. Sphenacodontids are only unambiguously known from Europe and North America (which were contiguous adjacent regions as part of Pangaea), though an indeterminate possible record has been reported from the Pedra de Fogo Formation in Brazil, implying they may have had a wider distribution.

Sphenacodontidae is placed as part of the broader clade Sphenacodontia. Within Sphenacodontia, Sphenacodontidae is widely accepted to be the group most closely related to Therapsida, which includes living mammals. The clade Sphenacodontoidea is a narrower subclade of Sphenacodontia, to designate the most recent common ancestor of Sphenacodontidae and Therapsida and all their descendants, and is defined by certain features of the skull.

Sphenacodontidae in a cladogram after Fröbisch et al., 2011:

- - †Edaphosauridae
  - Sphenacodontia
    - †Haptodus garnettensis
    - - †Palaeohatteria longicaudata
      - †Ianthodon schultzei
      - - †Cutleria wilmarthi
        - Sphenacodontoidea
          - Therapsida
          - †Sphenacodontidae
            - †Secodontosaurus obtusidens
            - - †Cryptovenator hirschbergeri
              - - †Sphenacodon
                - †Ctenospondylus
                - †Dimetrodon

== See also ==
- Evolution of mammals
