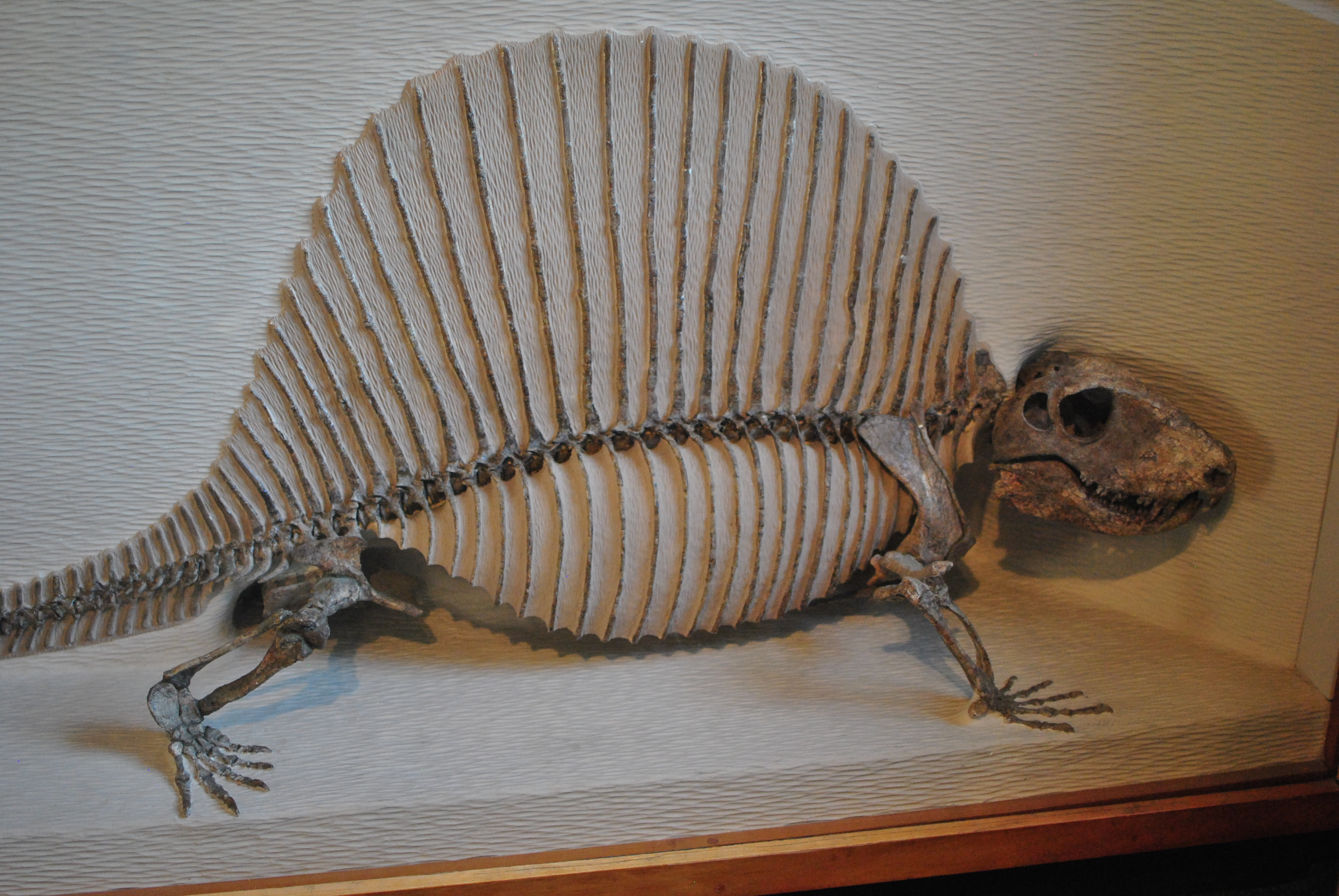
- Mounted skeleton of Dimetrodon milleri, Harvard Museum of Natural History

Scientific classification
- Kingdom: Animalia
- Phylum: Chordata
- Clade: Tetrapoda
- Clade: Reptiliomorpha
- Clade: Amniota
- Clade: Synapsida
- Informal group: †Pelycosauria; Cope, 1878

Groups included
- †Caseidae; †Eothyrididae; †Varanopidae?; †Ophiacodontidae; †Edaphosauridae; †Palaeohatteriidae; †Sphenacodontidae

Synapsids that are not considered pelycosaurs
- Therapsida

= Pelycosaur =

Pelycosaurs Temporal range: Pennsylvanian - Capitanian, 308–260.4 Ma Descendant taxon Therapsida survives to present.

Informal grouping composed of basal or primitive Late Paleozoic synapsids

Pelycosaur (/ˈpɛlɪkəsɔːr/ PEL-i-kə-sor) is an older term for basal or primitive Late Paleozoic synapsids, excluding the therapsids and their descendants. Previously, the term mammal-like reptile was used, and Pelycosauria was considered an order, but this is now thought to be incorrect and outdated. The terms stem mammals, protomammals, and basal or primitive synapsids are instead used where needed.

Because Pelycosaur excludes its own descendants, the advanced synapsid group Therapsida, the term is paraphyletic and contrary to modern formal naming practice. Thus the name pelycosaurs, similar to the term mammal-like reptiles, fell out of favor among scientists by the 21st century, and is only used informally, if at all, in the modern scientific literature.

== Etymology ==
The modern word was created from Greek pélyx meaning 'basin' and saûros meaning 'lizard'. The term pelycosaur has been fairly well abandoned by paleontologists because it no longer matches the features that distinguish a clade.

In phylogenetic nomenclature, "Pelycosauria" is not used formally, since it does not constitute a group of all organisms descended from some common ancestor (a clade), specifically excluding therapsids, which are descended from pelycosaurs. Instead, it represents a paraphyletic "grade" of basal synapsids leading up to the clade Therapsida.

Eupelycosauria is used as a proper monophyletic group to designate the clade that includes most pelycosaurs, along with the Therapsida and Mammalia. Caseasauria a pelycosaur side-branch, or clade, that did not leave any descendants.

== Evolutionary history ==
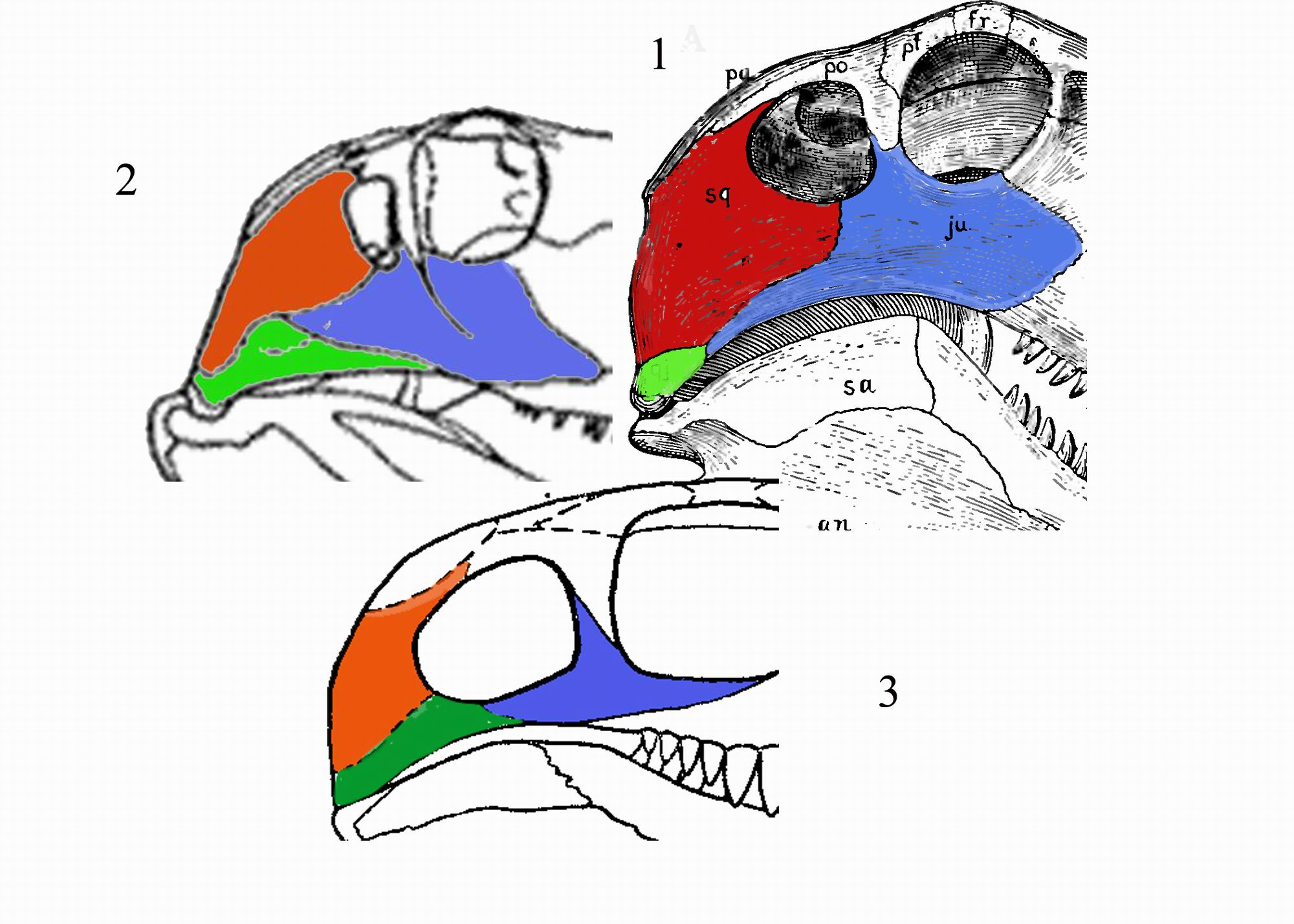
Comparison of "pelycosaurian" skulls: 1 sphenacodont, 2 ophiacodont, 3 caseid. The quadratojugale is green, squamosale is red, jugale is blue.

The pelycosaurs appear to have been a group of synapsids that have direct ancestral links with the mammals, having differentiated teeth and a developing hard palate. The pelycosaurs appeared during the Late Carboniferous and reached their apex in the early part of the Permian, remaining the dominant land animals for some 40 million years. A few continued into the Capitanian, but they experienced a sharp decline in diversity in the late Kungurian. They were succeeded by the therapsids.

== Description ==
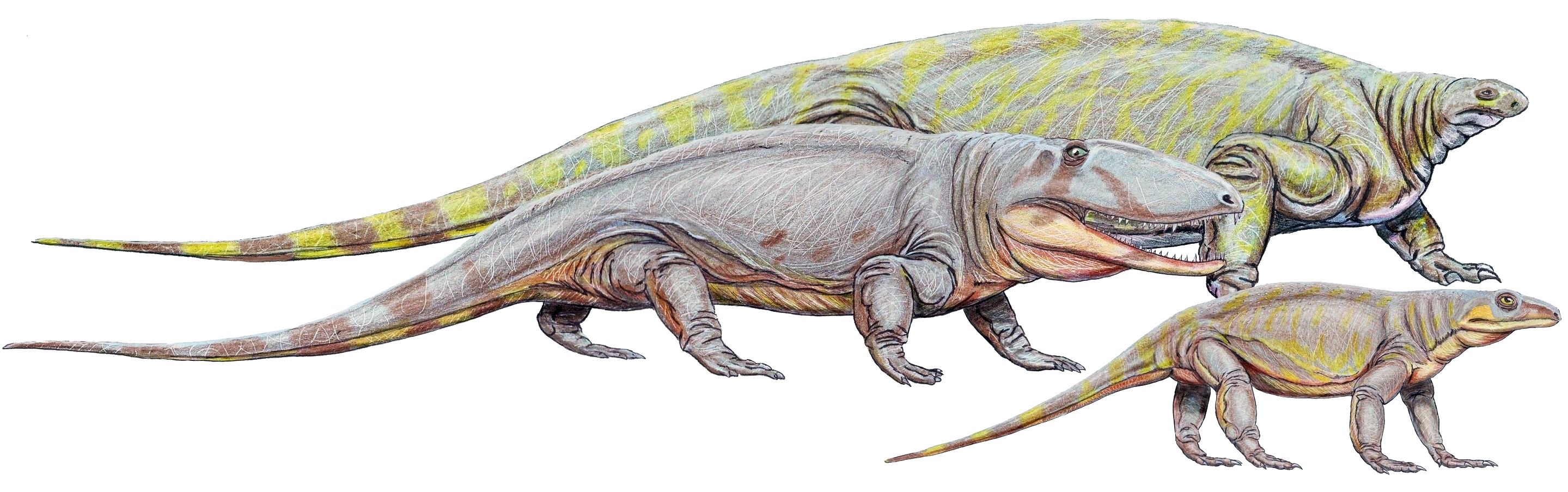
Cotylorhynchus (background), Ophiacodon and Varanops

Some species were quite large, growing to a length of 3 metres (10 ft) or more, although most species were much smaller. Well-known pelycosaurs include the genera Dimetrodon, Sphenacodon, Edaphosaurus, and Ophiacodon.

Pelycosaur fossils have been found mainly in Europe and North America, although some small, late-surviving forms are known from Russia and South Africa.

Unlike lepidosaurian reptiles, pelycosaurs might have lacked reptilian epidermal scales. Fossil evidence from some varanopids shows that parts of the skin were covered in rows of osteoderms, presumably overlain by horny scutes. The belly was covered in rectangular scutes, looking like those present in crocodiles.

Parts of the skin not covered in scutes might have had naked, glandular skin like that found in some mammals. Dermal scutes are also found in a diverse number of extant mammals with conservative body types, such as in the tails of some rodents, sengis, moonrats, the opossums, and other marsupials, and as regular dermal armour with underlying bone in the armadillo.

At least two pelycosaur clades independently evolved a tall sail, consisting of elongated vertebral spines: the edaphosaurids and the sphenacodontids. In life, this may have been covered by skin, and likely functioned as a thermoregulatory device or as a mating display.

== Taxonomy ==
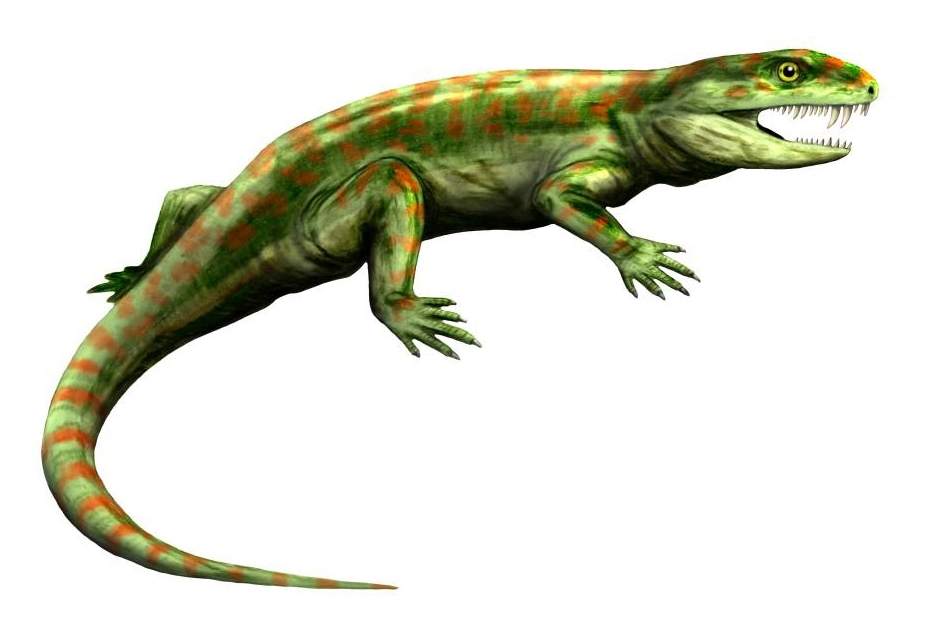
Eothyris

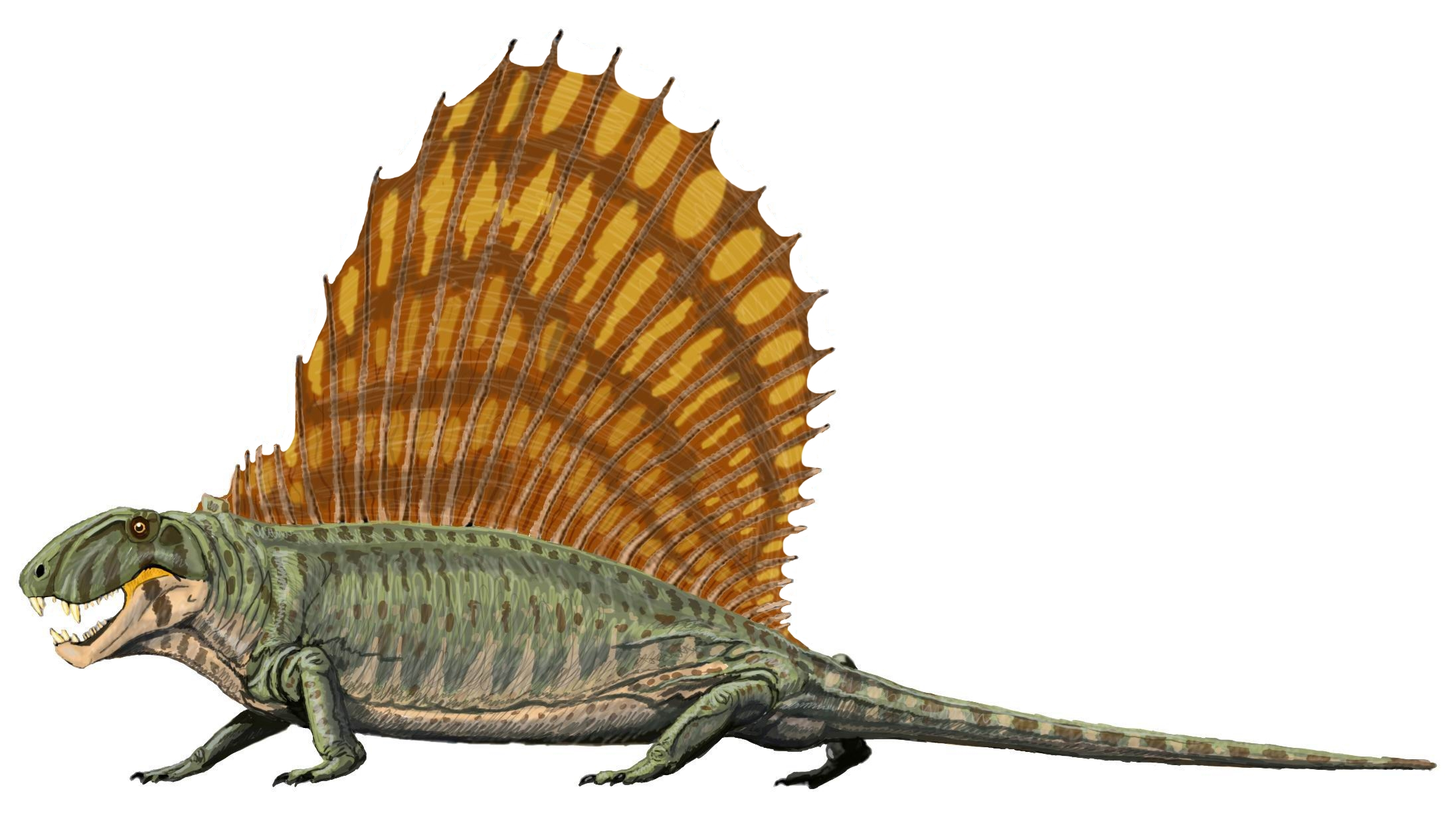
Dimetrodon – a sphenacodontid

In traditional classification, the order Pelycosauria is paraphyletic in that the therapsids (the "higher" synapsids) have emerged from them. That means Pelycosauria is a grouping of animals that does not contain all descendants of its common ancestor, as is often required by phylogenetic nomenclature. In evolutionary taxonomy, Therapsida is a separated order from Pelycosauria, and mammals (having evolved from therapsids) are separated from both as their own class. This use has not been recommended by a majority of systematists since the 1990s, but several paleontologists nevertheless continue using this word.

In 1940, the group was reviewed in detail, and every species known at the time described, with many illustrated, in an important monograph by Alfred Sherwood Romer and Llewellyn Price. The following classification was presented by Benton in 2004.

- Order Pelycosauria*
  - Suborder Caseasauria
    - Family Eothyrididae
    - Family Caseidae
  - Suborder Eupelycosauria
    - Family Varanopidae
    - Family Ophiacodontidae
    - Family Edaphosauridae
    - Infraorder Sphenacodontia
      - Family Sphenacodontidae
- Order Therapsida

== See also ==
- Evolution of mammals
- List of pelycosaurs
- Vertebrate paleontology – Scientific study of prehistoric vertebrates
