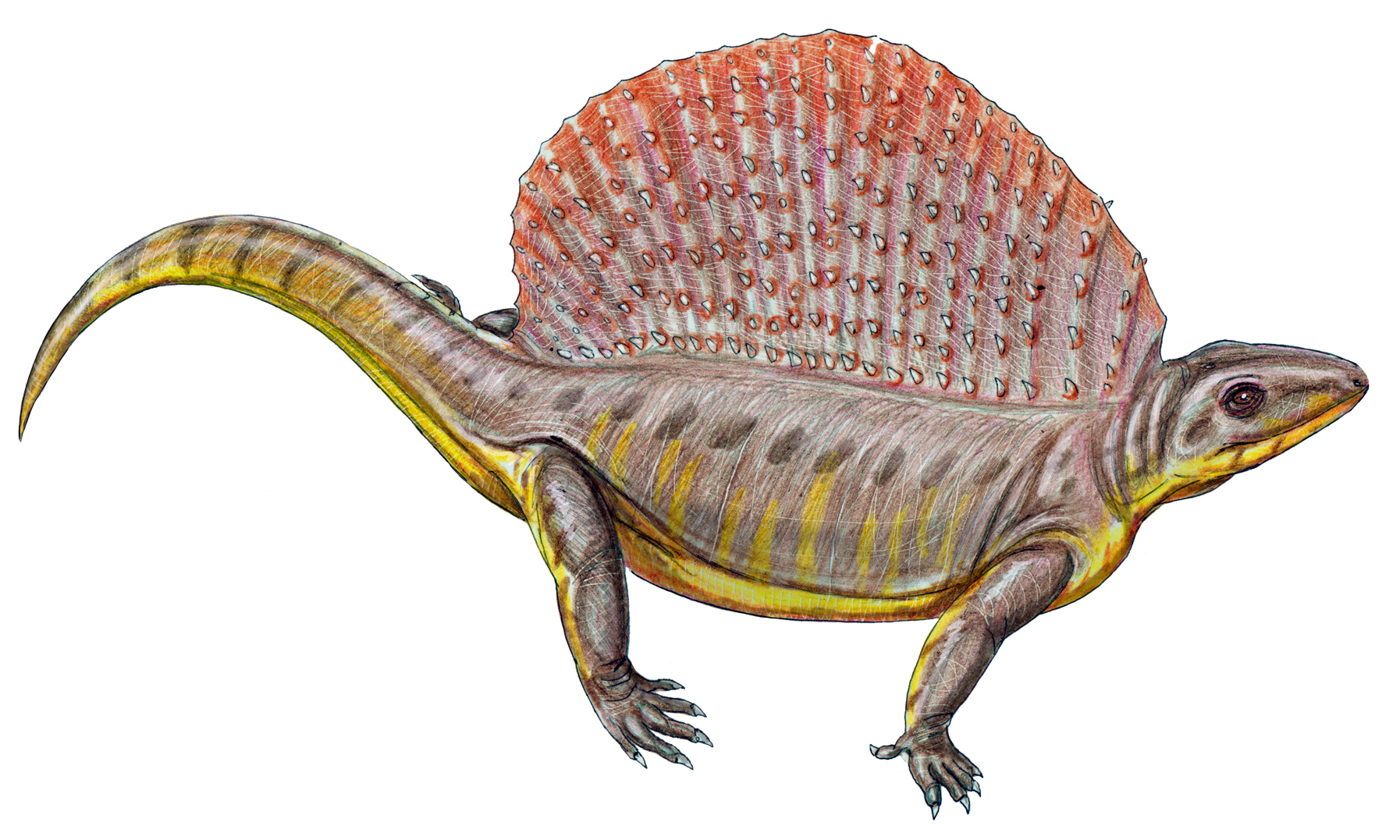
- Life reconstruction of B. mirabilis

Scientific classification
- Domain: Eukaryota
- Kingdom: Animalia
- Phylum: Chordata
- Clade: Synapsida
- Clade: Metopophora
- Clade: Haptodontiformes
- Clade: Sphenacomorpha
- Family: †Edaphosauridae
- Genus: †Bohemiclavulus; Spindler et al., 2019

Type species
- †Bohemuclavulus mirabilis (Fritsch, 1895)

Synonyms
- Ianthasaurus mirabilis Fritsch, 1895b; Naosaurus mirabilis Fritsch, 1895a; Edaphosaurus mirabilis Fritsch, 1895b

= Bohemiclavulus =

Bohemiclavulus Temporal range: Pennsylvanian, Gzhelian

Extinct genus of synapsids

Bohemiclavulus is a genus of synapsids that was discovered in the Slaný Formation of the Czech Republic. The type, and currently only, species is B. mirabilis.

== Discovery and naming ==
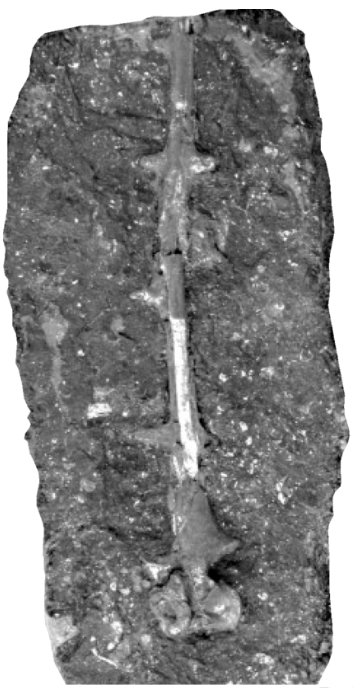
NM 633, the holotype specimen, in 1895

The holotype, NM 633, consists only of a single spinous process fragment, and it was found in the Czech Republic.

Antonin Fritsch originally named Bohemiclavulus in 1895a with the binomial Naosaurus mirabilis. It was renamed Ianthasaurus mirabilis in 1895b, and was renamed to Edaphosaurus mirabilis later that year. In 2019, a new genus was created for the species.

== Classification ==
Bohemiclavulus has been classified as a member of the Edaphosauridae by Spindler et al. (2019).

The cladogram of Spindler et al. (2019) is shown simplified below:

- Edaphosauridae
  - Xyrospondylus
  - - Bohemiclavulus
    - - Ianthasaurus
      - - Glaucosaurus
        - - Gordodon
          - - Remigiomontanus
            - - Lupeosaurus
              - - Edaphosaurus novomexicanus
                - - E. boanerges
                  - - E. cruciger
                    - E. pogonias

== See also ==
- List of pelycosaurs
