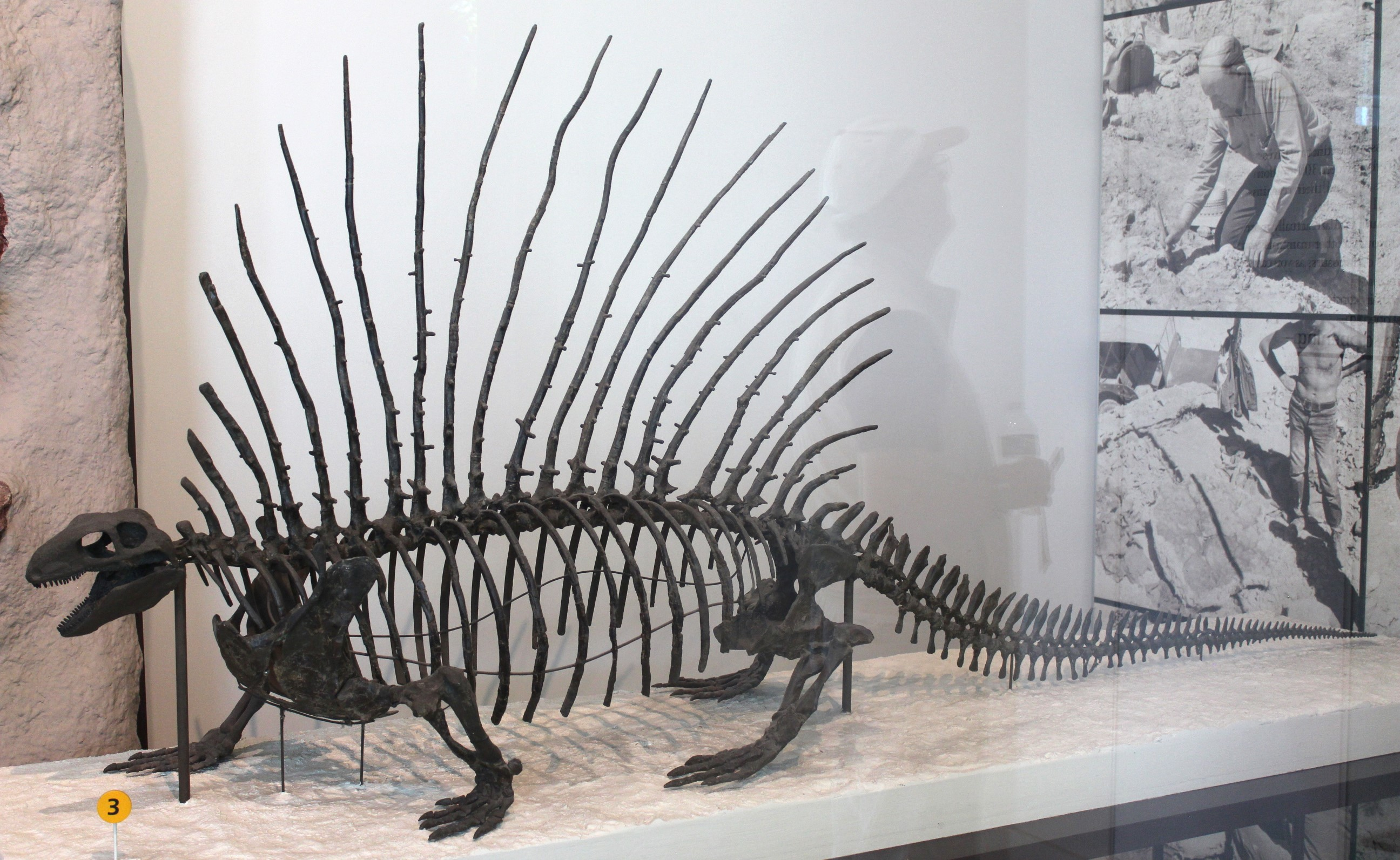
- Restored specimen of E. boanerges, AMNH

Scientific classification
- Kingdom: Animalia
- Phylum: Chordata
- Clade: Synapsida
- Clade: Sphenacomorpha
- Family: †Edaphosauridae
- Genus: †Edaphosaurus; Cope, 1882

Type species
- †Edaphosaurus pogonias Cope, 1882

Species
- †E. cruciger (Cope, 1878) (originally Dimetrodon); †E. pogonias Cope, 1882; †E. novomexicanus Williston and Case, 1913; †E. boanerges Romer & Price, 1940; †E. colohistion Berman, 1979

Synonyms
- Brachycnemius (Williston, 1911); Naosaurus (Cope, 1886)

= Edaphosaurus =

Edaphosaurus Temporal range: Pennsylvanian to Cisuralian (Gzhelian to Kungurian), 303.4–272.5 Ma

Extinct genus of synapsids

Edaphosaurus (/ˌɛdəfoʊˈsɔːrəs/, meaning "pavement lizard" for the dense clusters of its teeth) is a genus of extinct edaphosaurid synapsids that lived in what is now North America and Europe around 303.4 to 272.5 million years ago, during the Late Carboniferous to Early Permian. The American paleontologist Edward Drinker Cope first described Edaphosaurus in 1882, naming it for the "dental pavement" on both the upper and lower jaws, from the Greek edaphos έδαφος ("ground"; also "pavement") and σαῦρος (sauros) ("lizard").

Edaphosaurus is important as one of the earliest-known, large, plant-eating (herbivorous), amniote tetrapods (four-legged land-living vertebrates). In addition to the large tooth plates in its jaws, the most characteristic feature of Edaphosaurus is a neural spine sail on its back. A number of other synapsids from the same time period also have tall dorsal sails, most famously the large apex predator Dimetrodon. However, the sail on Edaphosaurus is different in shape and morphology. The first fossils of Edaphosaurus came from the Texas Red Beds in North America, with later finds in New Mexico, Oklahoma, West Virginia, and Ohio. Fragmentary fossils attributed to Edaphosaurus have also been found in eastern Germany in Central Europe.

== Etymology ==
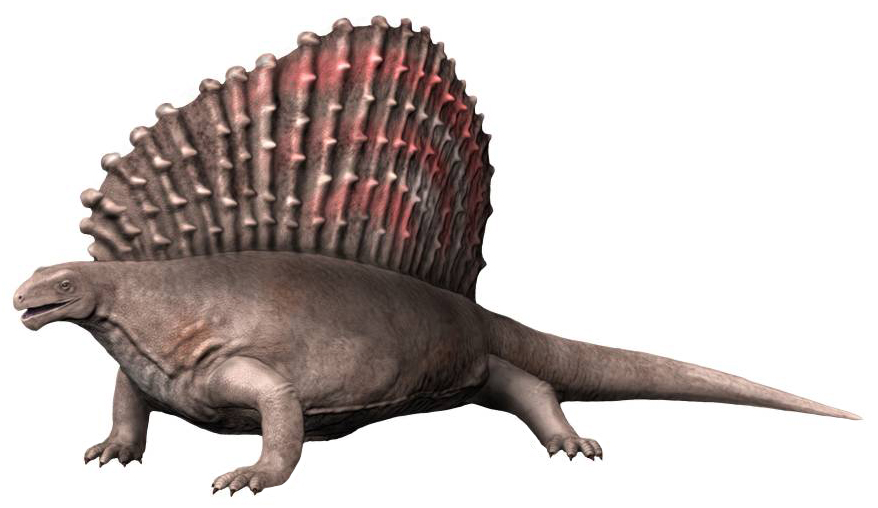
Edaphosaurus pogonias

The name Edaphosaurus, meant as "pavement lizard", is often translated inaccurately as "earth lizard", "ground lizard", or "foundation lizard" on the basis of other meanings for the Greek edaphos, such as "soil, earth, ground, land, base" used in Neo-Latin scientific nomenclature (edaphology). However, older names in paleontology, such as Edaphodon Buckland, 1838 "pavement tooth" (a fossil fish), match Cope's clearly intended meaning "pavement" for Greek edaphos in reference to the animal's teeth.

== Description and paleobiology ==
Size comparison of some species of Edaphosaurus.

Edaphosaurus species measured from 0.5 to 3.5 metres (1.6 to 11.5 ft) in length and weighed over 300 kg (660 lb). E. boanerges is estimated at 2.5–3 metres (8.2–9.8 ft) & 93 kg in weight. E. cruciger is estimated at 3 metres (9.8 ft) in length & 150 kg in weight. E. novomexicanus is estimated at 2.5 metres (8.2 ft) in length & 60 kg in weight. E. pogonias is 3.5 metres (11 ft) in length and 200 kg in weight. In keeping with its tiny head, the cervical vertebrae are reduced in length, while the dorsal vertebrae are massive, the tail is deep, the limbs are short and robust, and the ribs form a wide ribcage. Like most herbivores, Edaphosaurus would have had a capacious gut and symbiotic bacteria to aid in the breakdown of cellulose and other indigestible plant material. Like its more famous relative Dimetrodon, Edaphosaurus had a sail-like fin that was supported by bones of the vertebral column. Edaphosaurus differs from Dimetrodon in having cross-bars on the spines that supported its fin.

=== Skull ===
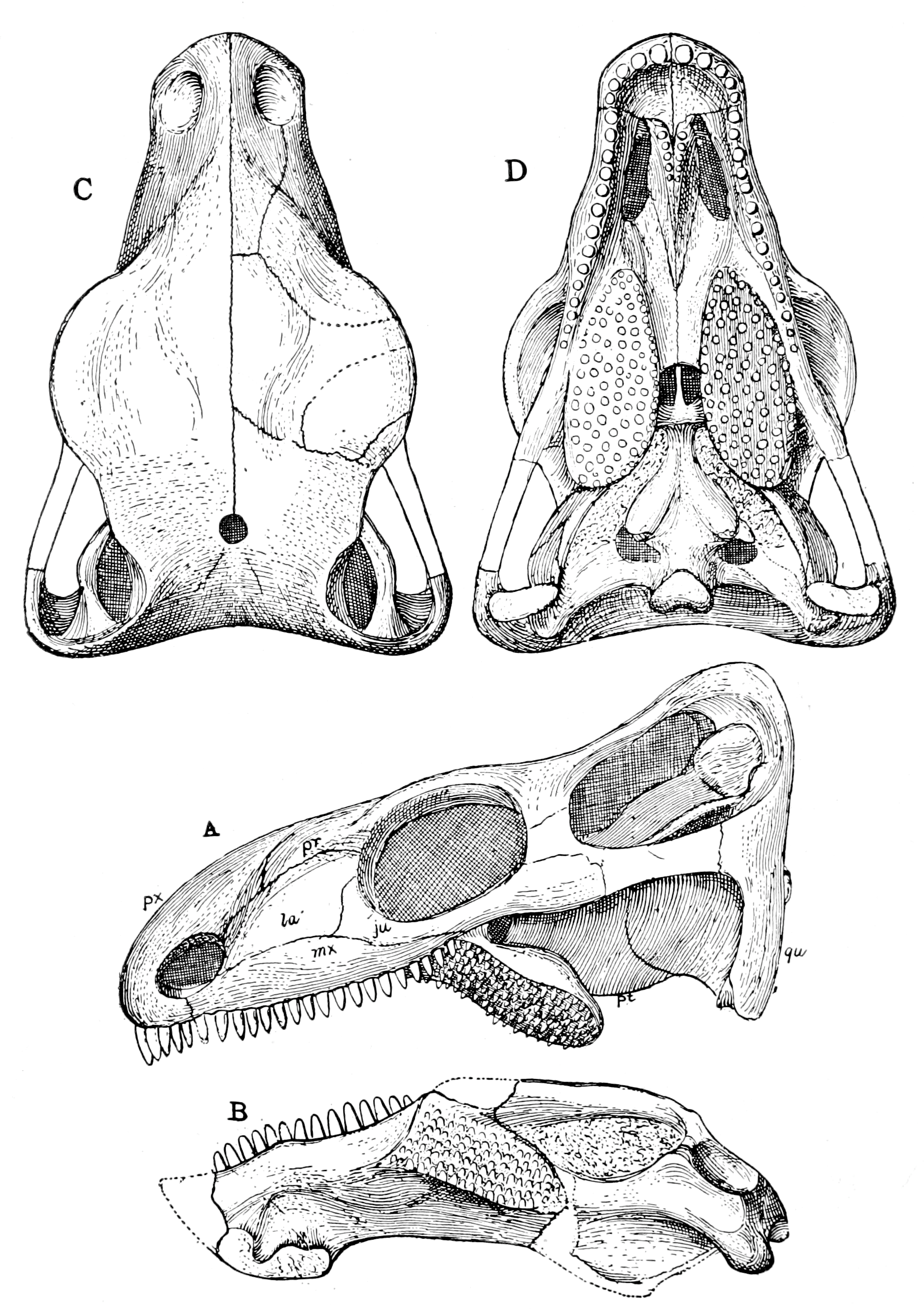
Skull of Edaphosaurus showing the tooth plates on the palate and on the inside of the lower jaw

The head of Edaphosaurus was short, relatively broad, triangular in outline, and remarkably small compared to its body size. The deep lower jaw likely had powerful muscles and the marginal teeth along the front and sides of its jaws had serrated tips, helping Edaphosaurus to crop bite-sized pieces from tough terrestrial plants. Back parts of the roof of the mouth and the inside of the lower jaw held dense batteries of peglike teeth, forming a broad crushing and grinding surface on each side above and below. Its jaw movements were propalinal (front to back). Early descriptions suggested that Edaphosaurus fed on invertebrates such as mollusks, which it would have crushed with its tooth plates. However, paleontologists now think that Edaphosaurus ate plants, although tooth-on-tooth wear between its upper and lower tooth plates indicates only "limited processing of food" compared to other early plant-eaters such as Diadectes, a large nonamniote reptiliomorph (Diadectidae) that lived at the same time.

The recently described Melanedaphodon from the Middle Pennsylvanian subperiod of the Carboniferous Period in North America is currently the earliest known edaphosaurid and represents a transitional stage from a diet of hard-shelled invertebrates such as insects and mollusks to fibrous plants. Melanedaphodon had large and bulbous teeth along its upper and lower jaws, but also had "a moderately-developed tooth battery" on its palate, "which appears intermediary towards the condition seen in Edaphosaurus" and would have helped process tough plant material. Melanedaphodon was found to be a sister taxon to Edaphosaurus and lived earlier than the edaphosaurid Ianthasaurus, which lacked tooth plates and ate insects.

=== Sail ===
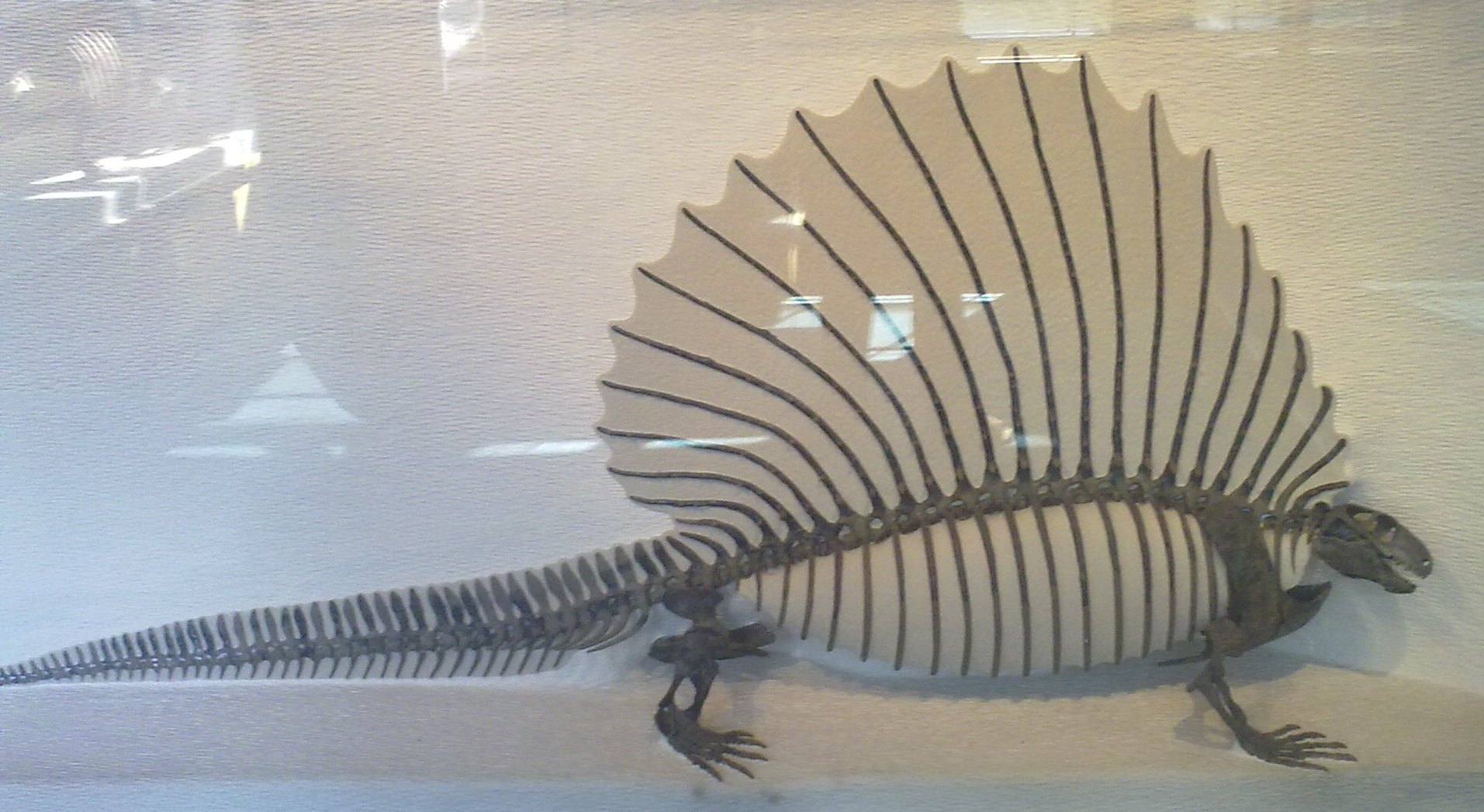
Skeleton of Edaphosaurus boanerges at the HMNH

The sail along the back of Edaphosaurus was supported by hugely elongated neural spines from neck to lumbar region, connected by tissue in life. When compared with the sail of Dimetrodon, the vertebral spines are shorter and heavier, and bear numerous small crossbars. Edaphosaurus and other members of the Edaphosauridae evolved tall dorsal sails independently of sail-back members of the Sphenacodontidae such as Dimetrodon and Secodontosaurus that lived at the same time, an unusual example of parallel evolution. The function(s) of the sail in both groups is still debated. Researchers have suggested that such sails could have provided camouflage, wind-powered sailing over water, anchoring for extra muscle support and rigidity for the backbone, protection against predator attacks, fat-storage areas, body-temperature control surfaces, or sexual display and species recognition. The height of the sail, curvature of the spines, and shape of the crossbars are distinct in each of the described species of Edaphosaurus and show a trend for larger and more elaborate (but fewer) projecting processes over time. The possible function (or functions) of the bony tubercles on the spines remains uncertain. Romer and Price suggested that the projections on the spines of Edaphosaurus might have been embedded in tissue under the skin and might have supported food-storage or fat similar to the hump of a camel. Bennett argued that the bony projections on Edaphosaurus spines were exposed and could create air turbulence for more efficient cooling over the surface of the sail to regulate body temperature. Recent research that examined the microscopic bone structure of the tall neural spines in edaphosaurids has raised doubts about a thermoregulatory role for the sail and suggests that a display function is more plausible.

=== Growth and metabolism ===
A study comparing the microscopic bone histology of the vertebral centra of Edaphosaurus and Dimetrodon found that the plant-eating Edaphosaurus "grew distinctly more slowly" than the predator Dimetrodon, which had a higher growth rate, reflecting an "elevated metabolism". Earlier studies of Edaphosaurus limb bones had also indicated slower growth and a lower metabolism, reflecting an ectothermic (cold-blooded) animal, although the plant-eating early synapsid caseids had a lower growth rate than Edaphosaurus. Evidence of growth rates include the number of blood vessels in the bones (with more vascularization in the rapidly growing Dimetrodon) and the presence of lamellar bone in the cancellous part. In contrast to slow growth in overall body size and in most bones, the histology of the tall dorsal spines on Edaphosaurus suggests that the projecting bony tubercles developed "by sudden, rapid growth over a few seasons", unlike the incremental growth of the tubercles in the earlier edaphosaurid Ianthasaurus.

== Species ==
Species	Location	Synonyms	Images
Edaphosaurus boanerges Romer & Price, 1940	Texas		
Edaphosaurus colohistion Berman, 1979	West Virginia		
Edaphosaurus cruciger (Cope, 1878)	Texas and Oklahoma	Edaphosaurus microdus	
Edaphosaurus novomexicanus Williston & Case, 1913	New Mexico		
Edaphosaurus pogonias Cope, 1882	Texas	Edaphosaurus claviger	

=== Reassigned species ===
Other proposed species of Edaphosaurus have been based on more fragmentary material that cannot be rigorously diagnosed to a genus/species level, but which may nonetheless represent edaphosaurids. The nominal species Naosaurus raymondi was assigned to Edaphosaurus by Romer and Price (1940), but Modesto and Reisz (1990) designated it a nomen vanum, and Spindler (2015) considered it probably referable to Ianthasaurus due to its age and stratigraphy. The taxon Naosaurus mirabilis Fritsch, 1895 from the Czech Republic was given its own genus Bohemiclavulus by Spindler et al. (2019).

== Discovery and classification ==
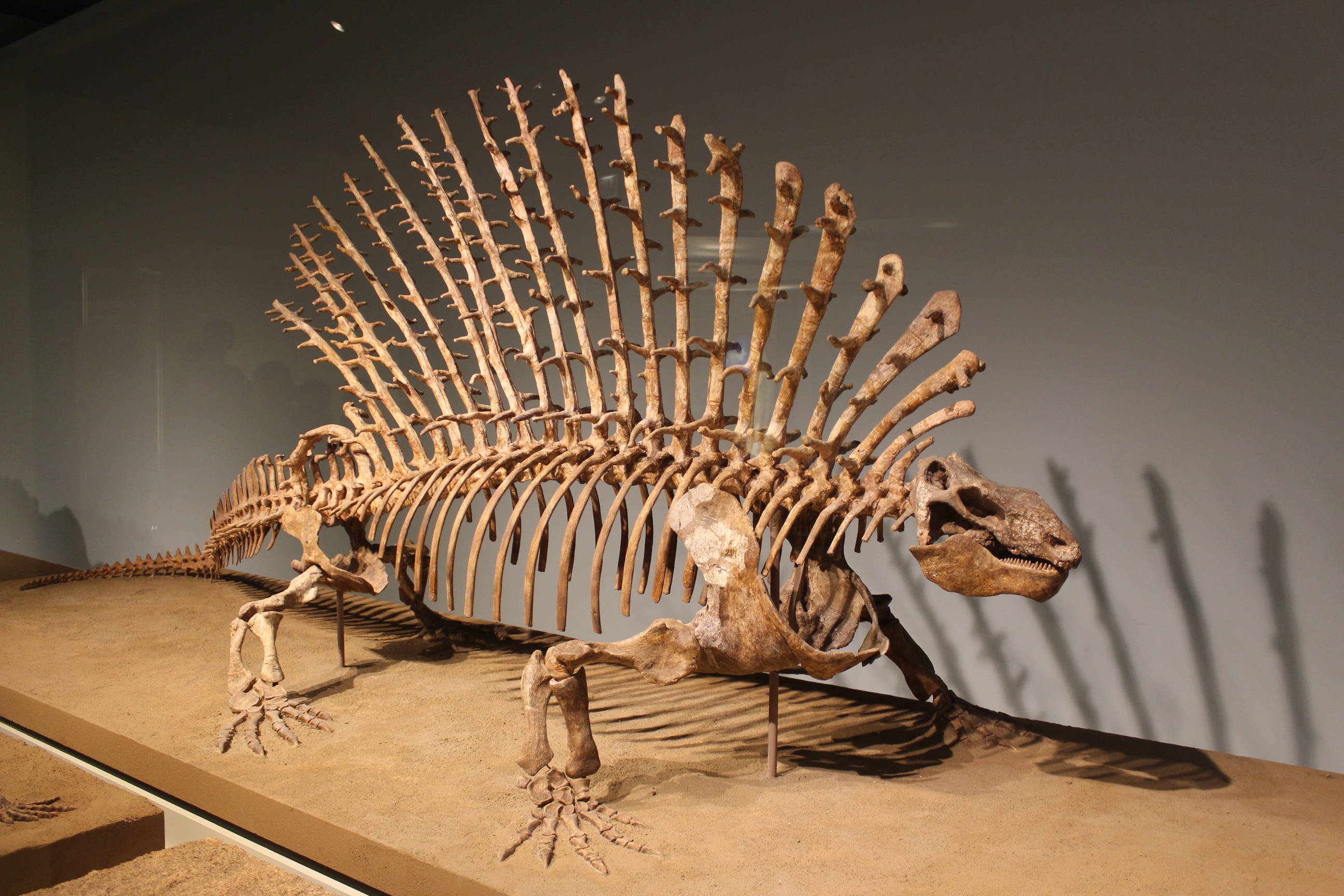
E. pogonias mount at the Field Museum

Edward Drinker Cope named and described Edaphosaurus ("pavement lizard") in 1882, based on a crushed skull and a left lower jaw from the Texas Red Beds. He noted in particular the "dense body of teeth" on both the upper and lower jaws, and used the term "dental pavement" in a table in his description. The type species name pogonias means "bearded" in Greek, referring to the enlarged inward sloping chin on the lower jaw. Cope classified Edaphosaurus as a member of his Pelycosauria and created the new family Edaphosauridae. The type material did not include any of the post-cranial skeleton apart from an axis vertebra and Cope was unaware of the animal's large sail, a feature then known only for Dimetrodon.

In 1886, Cope erected the new genus Naosaurus "ship lizard" (from Greek naos "ship") for skeletal remains similar to those of the long-spined Dimetrodon, but with distinctive "transverse processes or branches, which resemble the yardarms of a ship's mast". He speculated that "the yardarms were connected by membranes with the neural spine or mast, thus serving the animal as a sail with which he navigated the waters of the Permian lakes". He recognized three species: Naosaurus claviger "club-bearer" (for the projections on its spines; now considered a synonym of Edaphosaurus pogonias); Naosaurus cruciger "cross-bearer" (for the projections on its spines; first described by Cope as Dimetrodon cruciger in 1878; now Edaphosaurus cruciger, the largest species in size); and Naosaurus microdus "small tooth" (first described as Edaphosaurus microdus in 1884). Cope noted some incomplete skull material found associated with the specimens of N. claviger and N. microdus, but thought Naosaurus was distinct from Edaphosaurus. He later decided that Naosaurus must have had a large carnivorous skull similar to Dimetrodon, although he had no direct fossil proof. In 1910, German paleontologist Otto Jaekel reported remains near Dresden in Saxony, which he called Naosaurus credneri.

In 1907, American paleontologist Ermine Cowles Case suggested in his monograph on the Pelycosauria (pages 145 and 146) that the skull of Edaphosaurus might belong with skeletons called Naosaurus, based on a specimen found in 1906 that appeared to associate elements of both. In 1913, Samuel Wendell Williston and Case described the new species Edaphosaurus novomexicanus from a fairly complete specimen unearthed in New Mexico in 1910, in which a sailbacked Naosaurus-type skeleton was found with a small Edaphosaurus-type skull. The older generic name Edaphosaurus Cope, 1882 became the valid one.

In 1940, paleontologists Alfred Sherwood Romer and Llewellyn Ivor Price named the new species Edaphosaurus boanerges ("thunderous orator") – an ironic reference to the remarkably small size of the holotype lower jaw on a composite skeleton originally mounted in the Museum of Comparative Zoology (Harvard University) with the head restored based on the larger species Edaphosaurus cruciger.

In 1979, paleontologist David Berman erected Edaphosaurus colohistion ("stunted sail") for an early species with a relatively small sail, based on fossils from West Virginia.

The following cladogram is modified from the phylogenetic analysis in Mann, Henrici, Sues and Pierce (2023).

- Edaphosauridae
  - Ianthasaurus
  - - Glaucosaurus
    - Lupeosaurus
    - Melanedaphodon
    - Gordodon
    - Edaphosaurus
      - Edaphosaurus novomexicanus
      - - Edaphosaurus colohistion
        - - Edaphosaurus boanerges
          - - Edaphosaurus cruciger
            - Edaphosaurus pogonias

== In popular culture ==
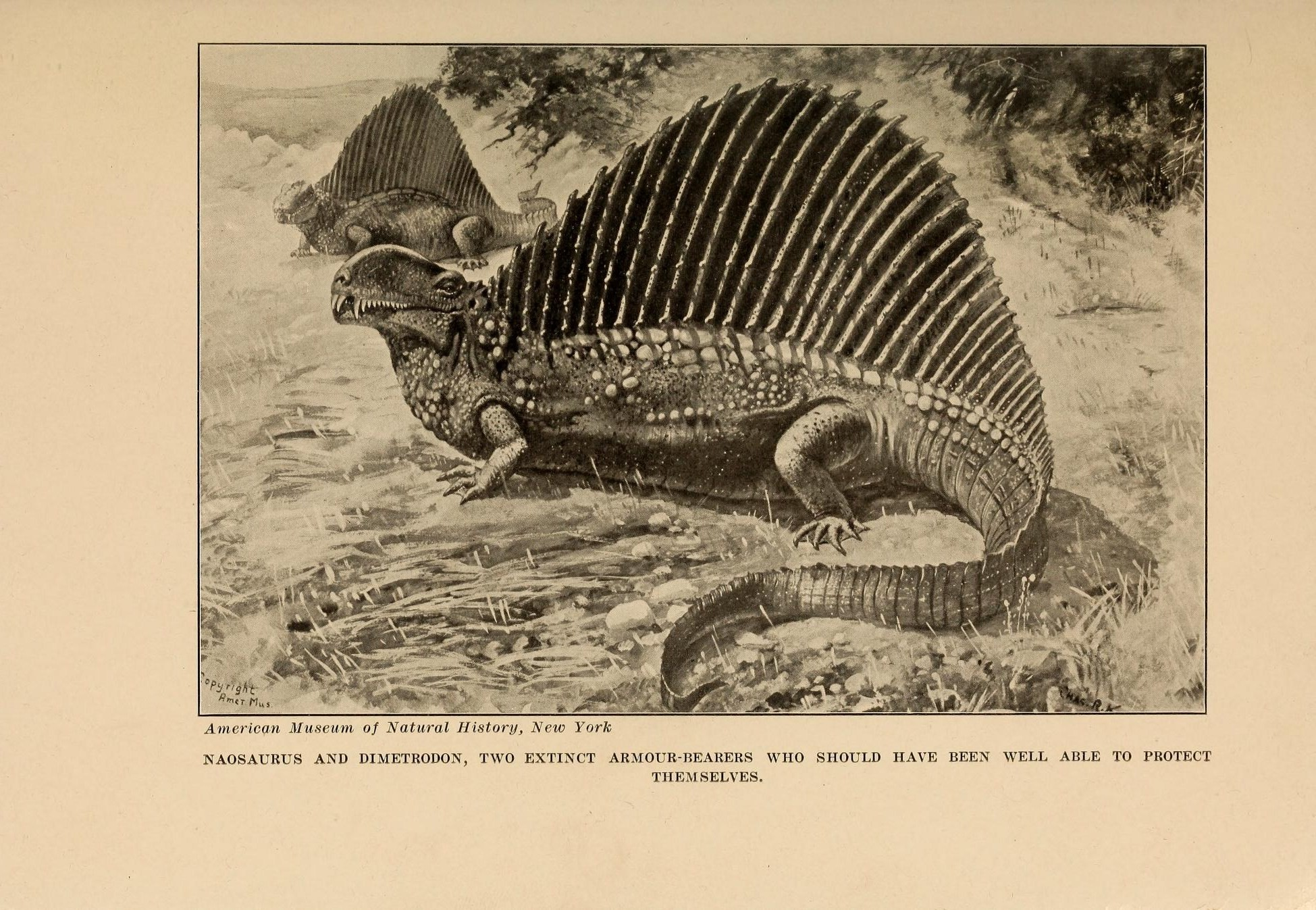
Charles R. Knight's original erroneous artistic reconstruction of Naosaurus with a carnivorous skull and a sail with bony crossbars.

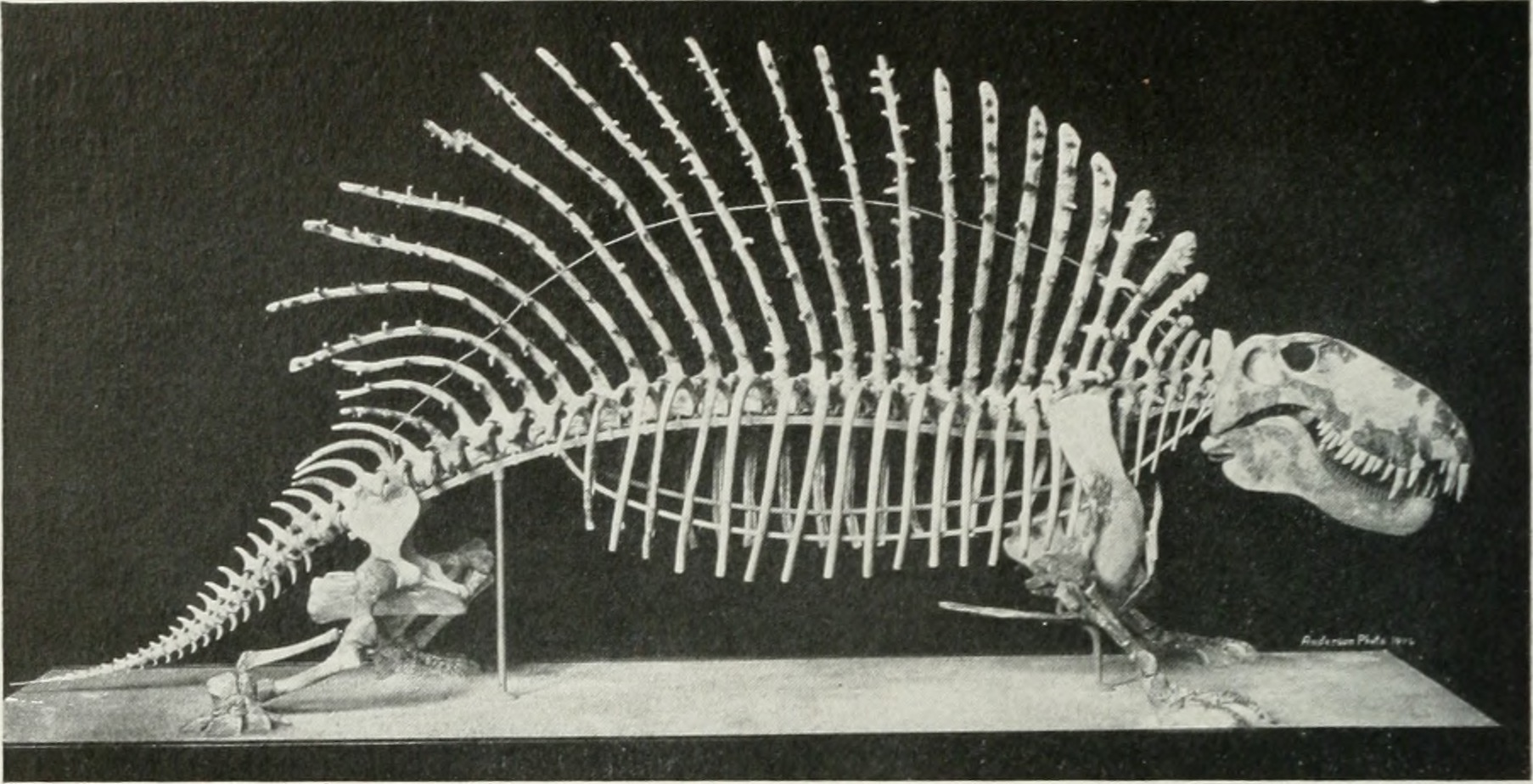
The Naosaurus skeletal mount, with wrongly attributed Dimetrodon skull, as mounted in the AMNH in 1906-1907

The strange appearance of Edaphosaurus with its distinctive dorsal sail composed of tall spines studded with bony knobs has made it a popular subject for scientific reconstructions and paleoart in museums and in books. However, confusion over the animal's skull dating back to Cope's ideas about "Naosaurus" and over other details led to a long history of scientific and artistic errors that lasted in some cases into the 1940s. The correct scientific name Edaphosaurus (rather than "Naosaurus") also was not used consistently until the 1940s.

At the urging of paleontologist Henry Fairfield Osborn, American paleoartist Charles R. Knight consulted with Edward Drinker Cope in person in early 1897 about a set of illustrations of prehistoric reptiles, one of Cope's specialties. Shortly after, Knight reconstructed Edaphosaurus (as "Naosaurus") with a Dimetrodon skull that Cope had previously referred to that genus in error. This painting was commissioned for the American Museum of Natural History in 1897 and was reprinted for Cope's obituary in the November 1898 issue of The Century Magazine. Knight later created a more accurate revised version of the painting that turned "Naosaurus" into Dimetrodon, with a corrected head and teeth, and a sail with smooth, unbarred spines. He also turned the Dimetrodon in the original background into Edaphosaurus (still called "Naosaurus" at the time) with a different head and a sail with crossbars.

German paleontologist Otto Jaekel argued in 1905 that there was no direct scientific evidence that the tall dorsal spines on Dimetrodon and "Naosaurus" were bound in a web of skin like a sail or fin (as portrayed by Cope, Knight, and others) and proposed instead that the long bony projections served as an array of separated spines to protect the animals, which allegedly could roll up like hedgehogs. Spiny-backed reconstructions of "Naosaurus" (with a large carnivore's head) appeared in different German sources, including as a tile mosaic on the façade of the Aquarium Berlin in 1913 (destroyed in World War II and later recreated).

Nearly complete specimens of Dimetrodon and Edaphosaurus (as "Naosaurus") had not been found yet by the first decade of the 20th century when American paleontologist E.C. Case produced his major monograph on the Pelycosauria in 1907. Case argued that the apparent lack of any associated elongate and cylindrical tail bones with the known fossils meant that Dimetrodon and "Naosaurus" must have had short tails in life. (Earlier, Cope had assumed that the animals had long tails as in most reptiles, an idea seen from his sketches and his advice to Charles R. Knight in 1897.) Based on the authority of Case, museums and artists at the time restored "Naosaurus" with a short tail. New fossil finds and research by A.S. Romer in the 1930s and 1940s showed that both Dimetrodon and Edaphosaurus had long tails, a feature similar to other "pelycosaurs" and seen as primitive.

The American Museum of Natural History mounted the first full skeletal reconstruction of Edaphosaurus as "Naosaurus claviger" (a synonym of Edaphosaurus pogonias) for public display in 1907 under the scientific direction of H.F. Osborn, along with W.D. Matthew. The main part of the "Naosaurus" skeleton was a set of dorsal vertebrae with high spines (AMNH 4015) from a partial Edaphosaurus pogonias specimen found by the fossil collector Charles H. Sternberg in Hog Creek, Texas in 1896. Because of the still incomplete knowledge of Edaphosaurus at the time, the rest of the mount was a "conjectural" composite of various real fossil bones collected in different places with other parts recreated in plaster, including a skull (AMNH 4081) based on Dimetrodon (per E.D. Cope, and despite Case's already expressed doubts about such a skull for "Naosaurus") and a hypothetical short tail (per Case). As "Naosaurus" was thought to be a close relative of Dimetrodon rather than Edaphosaurus, slender limbs (AMNH 4057) probably belonging to Dimetrodon dollovianus were also mounted with this composite specimen, rather than the correct, stockier limbs now known for Edaphosaurus. The big Dimetrodon-derived skull on the museum skeleton was later replaced with one modeled on Edaphosaurus cruciger, based on more updated research. The museum eventually dismantled the entire composite restoration and by the 1950s only displayed the original set of Edaphosaurus pogonias sail vertebrae alone on the wall in Brontosaur Hall next to an accurate, fully mounted fossil skeleton of the smaller species Edaphosaurus boanerges (a nearly complete specimen (AMNH 7003) collected from Archer County, Texas, by A.S. Romer in 1939). The fossil Edaphosaurus pogonias sail spines (AMNH 4015) were remounted in the 1990s with a recreated skull (but without other skeletal parts) in a metal armature shaped in the outline of the entire animal as part of the new Hall of Primitive Mammals, which opened at the American Museum of Natural History in 1996 after major renovations.

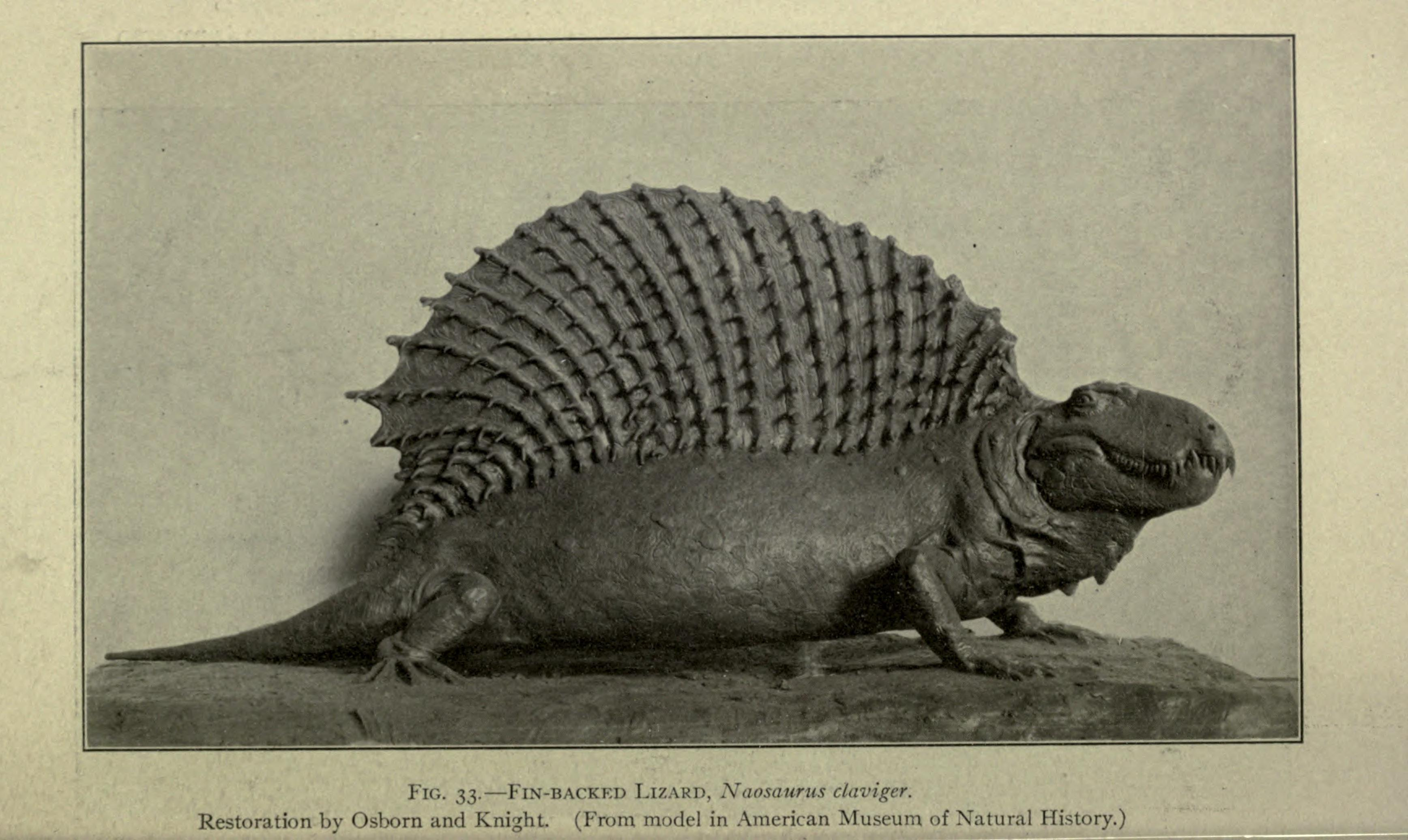
Charles R. Knight's 1907 model of "Naosaurus" created for the American Museum of Natural History under the guidance of H.F. Osborn.

Charles R. Knight had produced a small sculpture of a living "Naosaurus" in 1907 based on the speculative American Museum of Natural History mount. The model retained a Dimetrodon-like flesh-eater's head but differed from his earlier 1897 painted reconstruction in having a curved shape to the sail and a short tail. The May 4, 1907 issue of Scientific American featured a cover painting by Knight depicting a revised version of "Naosaurus" and an article (pages 368 and 370) entitled "Naosaurus: a Fossil Wonder", which described the restoration of the composite skeleton at the American Museum of Natural History and the creation of Knight's model, both under Osborn's direction.

The inaccuracy of much of Osborn's composite reconstruction of "Naosaurus" was detailed by E.C. Case in 1914 with a revised description of Edaphosaurus based on additional fossil material, including large parts of a skeleton with limb bones and a crushed skull, which Case had discovered in Archer County, Texas, in 1912 and brought to the University of Michigan. His reconstruction of Edaphosaurus cruciger, as shown in a drawing, had a much smaller head (with teeth for crushing mollusks or plants), more robust limbs, and a somewhat longer tail than Osborn's carnivorous "Naosaurus" mount. Case also confirmed that Edaphosaurus was the valid name rather than "Naosaurus". Despite his corrections, the name "Naosaurus", and even the outdated and incorrect Dimetrodon-like head, continued to appear in some popular sources.

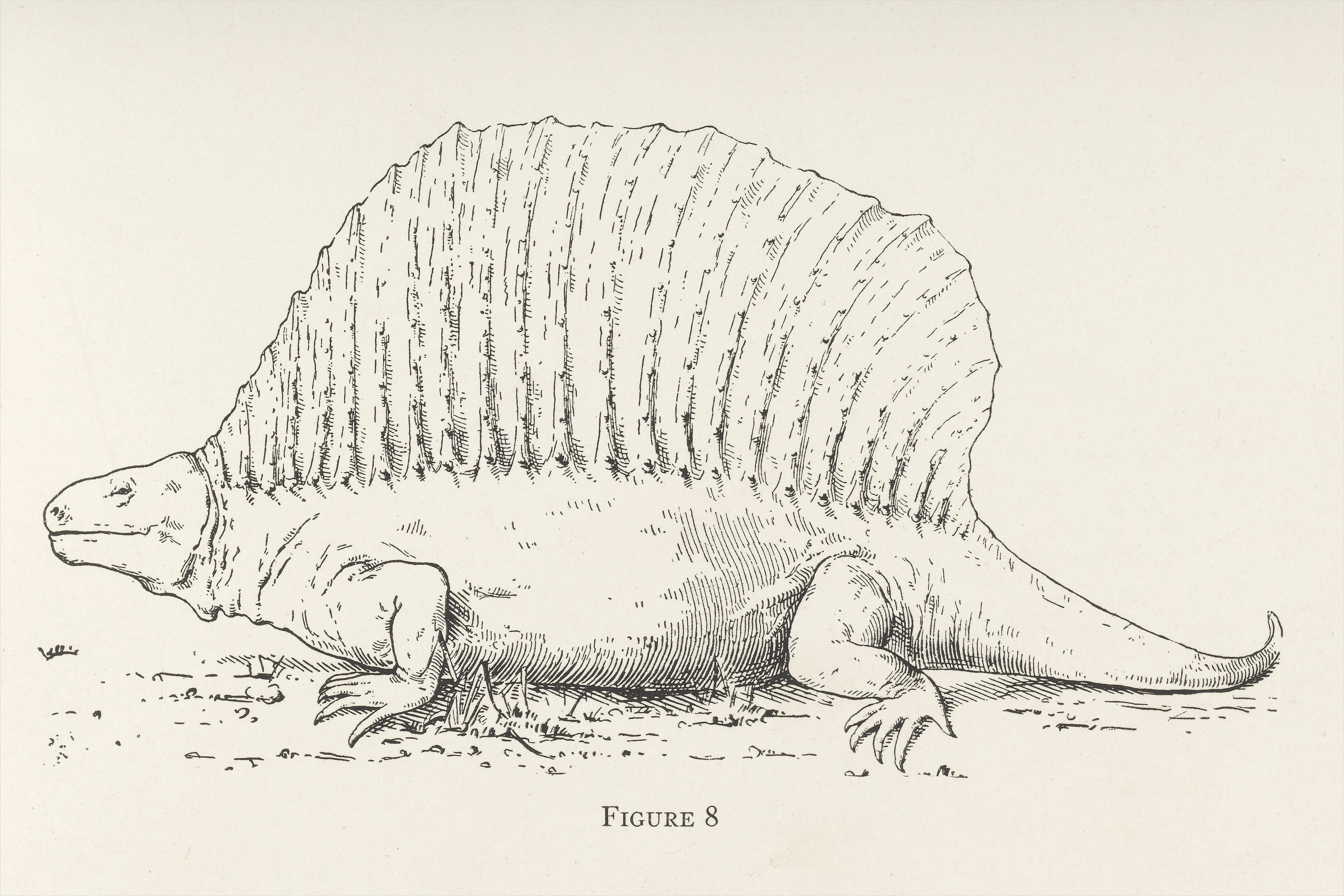
1914 Edaphosaurus reconstruction by. E.C. Case, who noted that the size of the feet and the length of the tail were conjectural.

In 1926, the Field Museum of Natural History in Chicago hired Charles R. Knight to create a series of 28 murals (worked on from 1926 through 1930) to depict life reconstructions of prehistoric animals in the different sections of the new fossil hall of the museum for Life Over Time. One of the large murals depicted the Permian Period, with a group of five Dimetrodons, and a single Edaphosaurus, along with a group of Casea, basking in the sun surrounded by a large marsh. The Permian mural was finished in 1930. Paleontologist Elmer Riggs described the new artistic addition in the March 1931 issue of the Field Museum News and used the name "Naosaurus" for Edaphosaurus, described as "inoffensive, and given to feeding on plants". Knight's 1930 depiction of Edaphosaurus, apart from its shortened tail, was much more accurate than his earlier images of "Naosaurus" for the American Museum of Natural History, incorporating a small head and a curved profile to the sail spines.

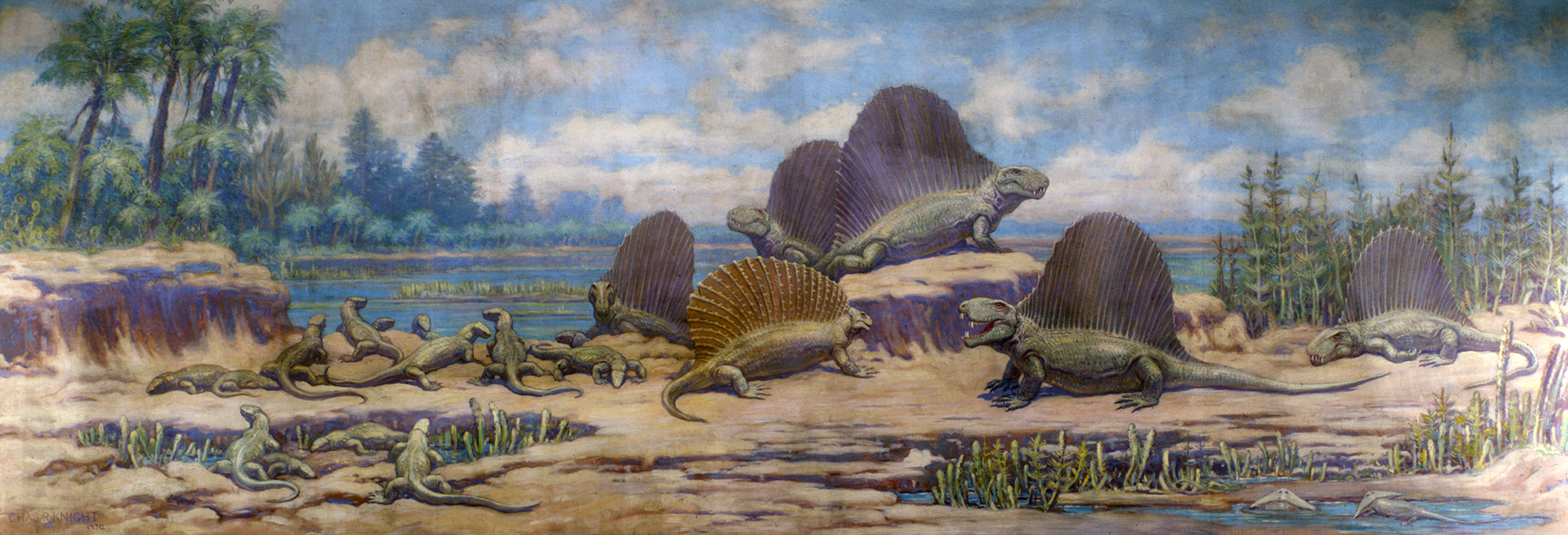
Charles R. Knight 1930 mural in the Field Museum depicting Edaphosaurus (center) in a Permian scene with Dimetrodon and Casea (left)

Artist Rudolph Zallinger depicted Edaphosaurus in a more scientifically updated form (with a long tail) alongside Dimetrodon and Sphenacodon to represent the Permian period in his famous The Age of Reptiles mural (1943-1947) at the Yale Peabody Museum. The mural was based on a smaller model version of the painting in egg tempera that later appeared in The World We Live In series published in Life magazine in 1952 to 1954. The September 7, 1953 issue of Life presented The Age of Reptiles in reverse image (earliest to latest, left to right) of the mural order as a double-sided foldout page in which Edaphosaurus appeared in an Early Permian landscape with plants and animals of the period. The magazine series was edited into a popular book in 1955 that also had a foldout page for Zallinger's The Age of Reptiles artwork.

The Czech illustrator and paleoartist Zdeněk Burian created a number of vivid paintings of Edaphosaurus set in Paleozoic landscapes. (The choice to portray Edaphosaurus was based in part on edaphosaurid fossils found in native Carboniferous rocks in what is now the Czech Republic, originally identified as "Naosaurus" and now called Bohemiclavulus.) These images appeared in the series of popular general audience books on prehistoric animals that Burian produced in collaboration with Czech paleontologists Josef Augusta and Zdeněk Špinar beginning in the 1930s and on into the 1970s. Some of the books were translated into other languages, including English. Burian's painting from 1941 restored Edaphosaurus with a large carnivorous head and short tail, reflecting an outdated "Naosaurus" concept of the animal. The artwork was featured in Josef Augusta's Divy prasvěta (Wonders of the Prehistoric World), published during World War II in biweekly pamphlet form between 1941 and 1942, and then republished as a full book after the war. Burian subsequently corrected his 1941 Edaphosaurus reconstruction in a painting with the more accurate small head of a plant-eater and a long tail, the version of Edaphosaurus that appeared in later translated editions of Burian's books with Augusta such as Prehistoric Animals (1956). Another painting of Edaphosaurus by Burian appeared on the cover of the 1968 third edition of the juvenile popular science book Ztracený svět (The Lost World), also written by Augusta. The book Life Before Man (1972), written by Zdeněk Špinar, included an additional depiction of Edaphosaurus by Burian.

Disney incorporated a pair of animatronic Edaphosaurus in the Ford Magic Skyway attraction for the 1964 New York World's Fair, which would go on to be relocated to Disneyland's Primeval World Diorama along the Disneyland Railroad and replicated for Epcot's Universe of Energy attraction and Tokyo Disneyland's Western River Railroad.

Edaphosaurus also appear in the 2005 documentary series Walking With Monsters, specifically the second episode, where a herd is attacked by a female Dimetrodon.

== See also ==
- Haptodus
- Ianthasaurus
- Melanedaphodon
- List of pelycosaurs
- Platyhystrix – an unrelated animal with a sail on its back
- Sphenacodon
- Dimetrodon
