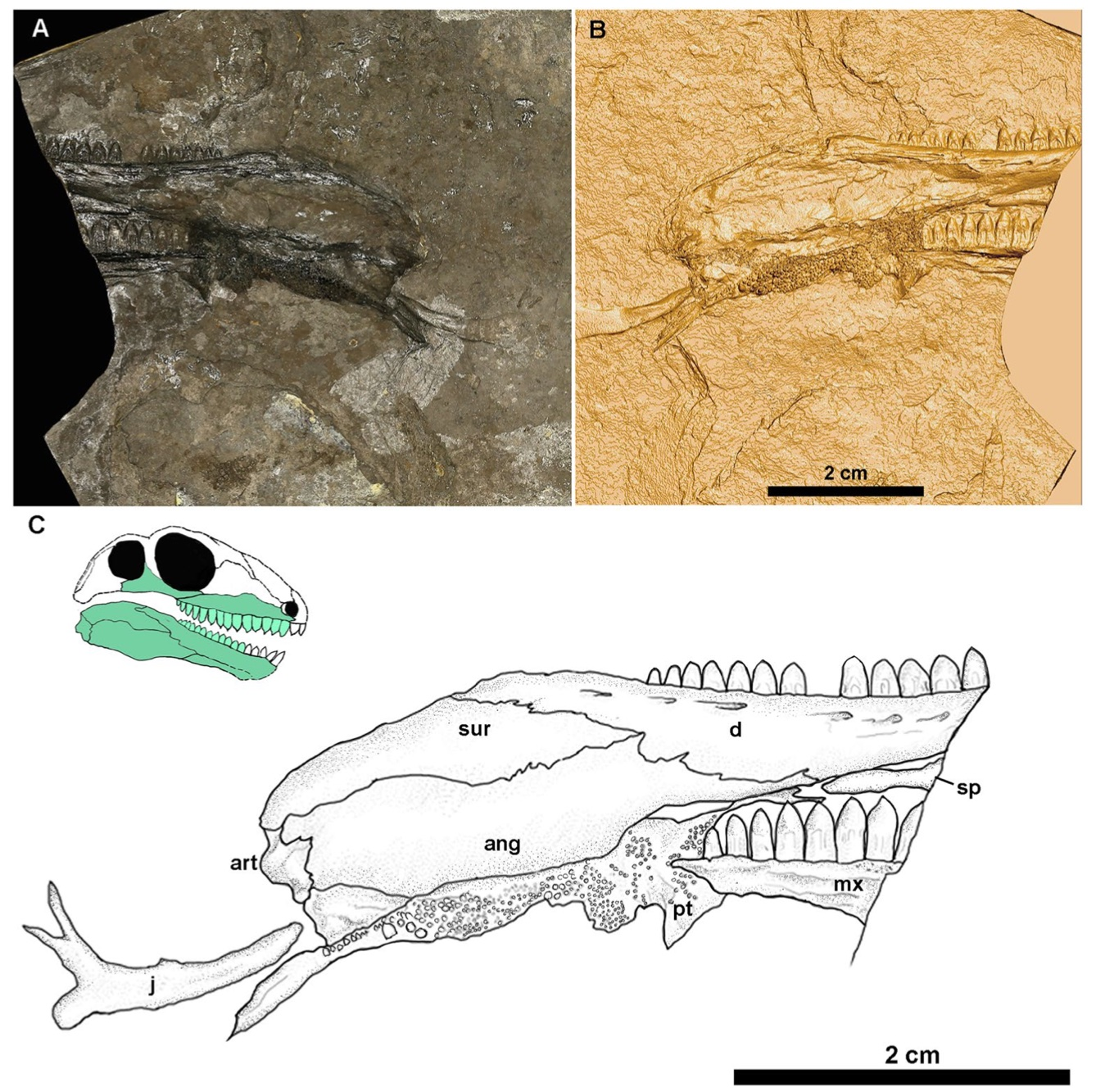
- Holotype specimen

Scientific classification
- Domain: Eukaryota
- Kingdom: Animalia
- Phylum: Chordata
- Clade: Synapsida
- Clade: Sphenacomorpha
- Family: †Edaphosauridae
- Genus: †Melanedaphodon; Mann et al., 2023

Type species
- †Melanedaphodon hovaneci Mann et al., 2023

= Melanedaphodon =

Melanedaphodon Temporal range: Late Carboniferous, Moscovian

Edaphosaurid synapsid genus from the Late Carboniferous

Melanedaphodon (meaning "black pavement tooth") is a genus of edaphosaurid synapsids that lived in North America during the Late Carboniferous epoch, during the Moscovian stage. The genus contains the type species, Melanedaphodon hovaneci, named and described in 2023 based on the holotype specimen hailing from the Allegheny Group. Several of the anatomical traits of Melanedaphodon are interpreted as suited for omnivory and low-fibre herbivory.

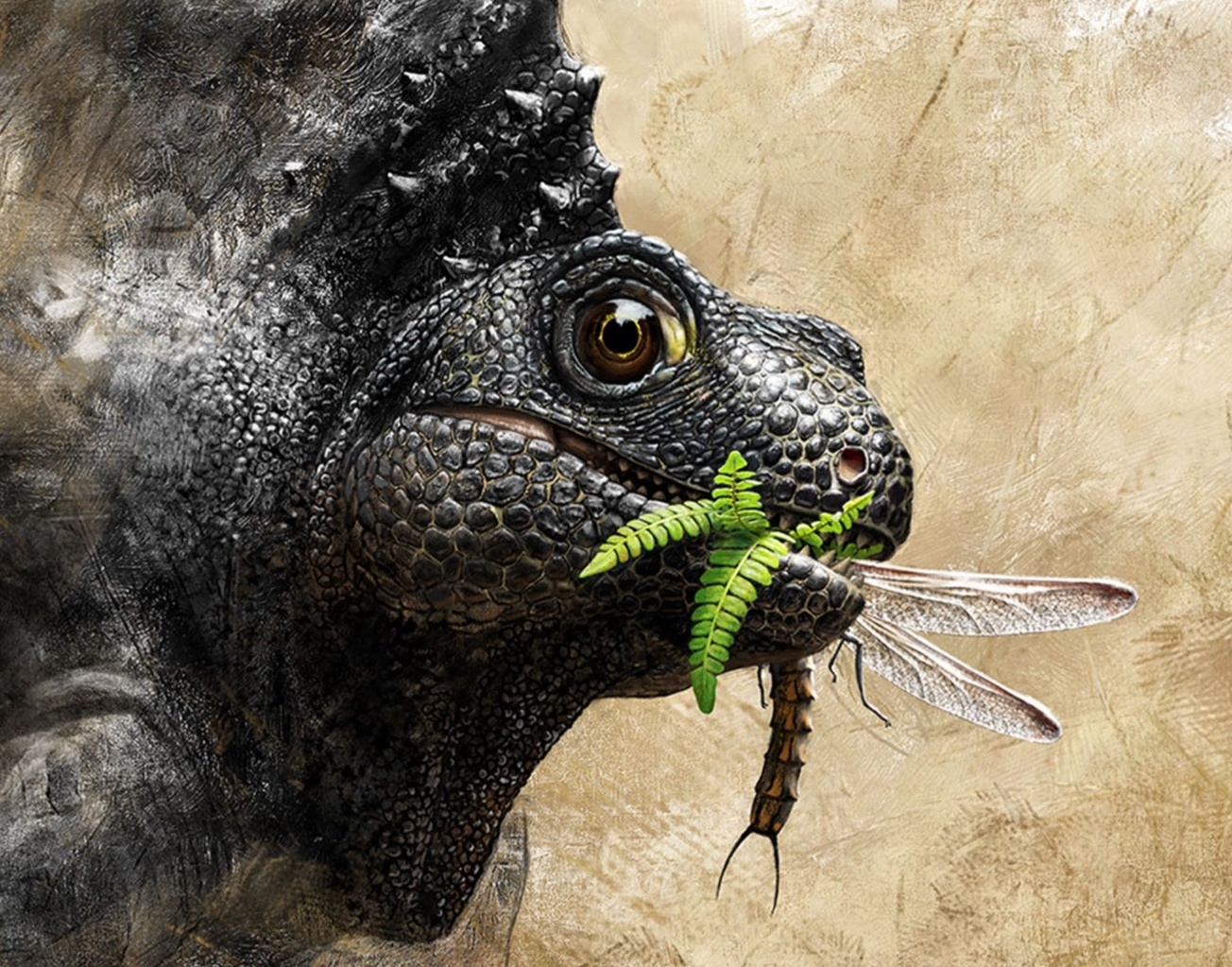
Life reconstruction of Melanedaphodon, consuming both plant and animal resources

== See also ==
- Edaphosaurus
- Dimetrodon
