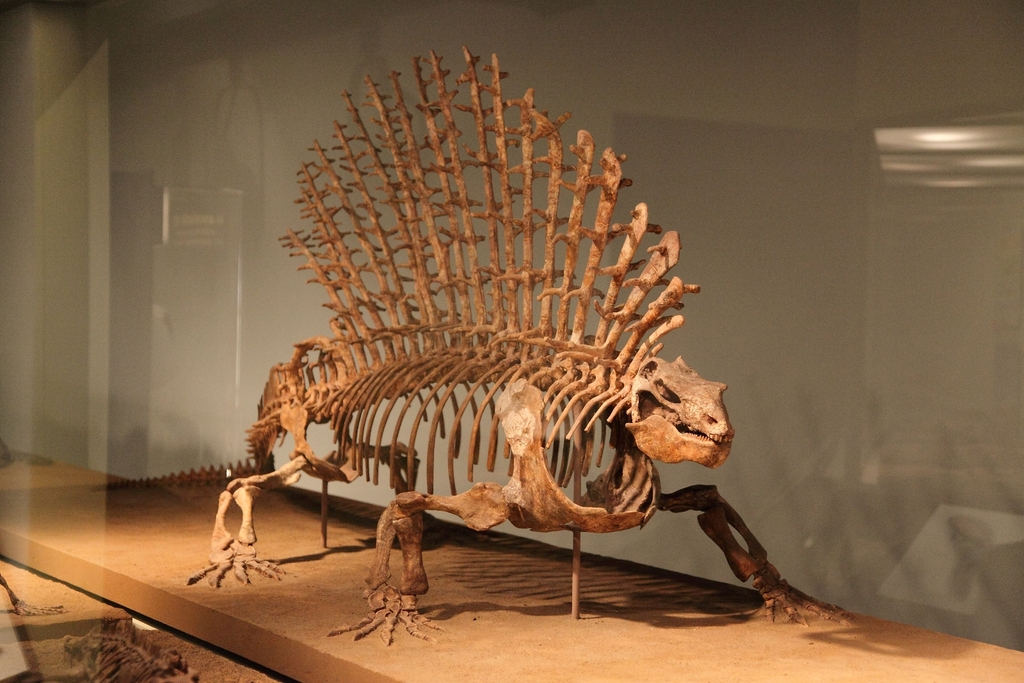
- Mounted skeleton of Edaphosaurus pogonias in the Field Museum of Natural History

Scientific classification
- Kingdom: Animalia
- Phylum: Chordata
- Clade: Synapsida
- Clade: Sphenacomorpha
- Family: †Edaphosauridae; Cope, 1882

Type species
- †Edaphosaurus pogonias Cope, 1882

Genera
- †Bohemiclavulus; †Edaphosaurus; †Gordodon; †Glaucosaurus; †Ianthasaurus; †Lupeosaurus; †Melanedaphodon; †Ramodendron; †Remigiomontanus; †Xyrospondylus

= Edaphosauridae =

Edaphosauridae Temporal range: Late Carboniferous to Early Permian, ~307–272 Ma

Extinct family of synapsids

Edaphosauridae is a family of mostly large (up to 3 m (9.8 ft) or more) Late Carboniferous to Early Permian synapsids. Edaphosaur fossils are so far known only from North America and Europe. Edaphosaurids transitioned from being small carnivores in their most primitive members into some of the earliest large terrestrial herbivores. They are noted for their neural spine sails on their backs, which unlike those of Dimetrodon exhibit distinctive outwards facing growths.

== Characteristics ==
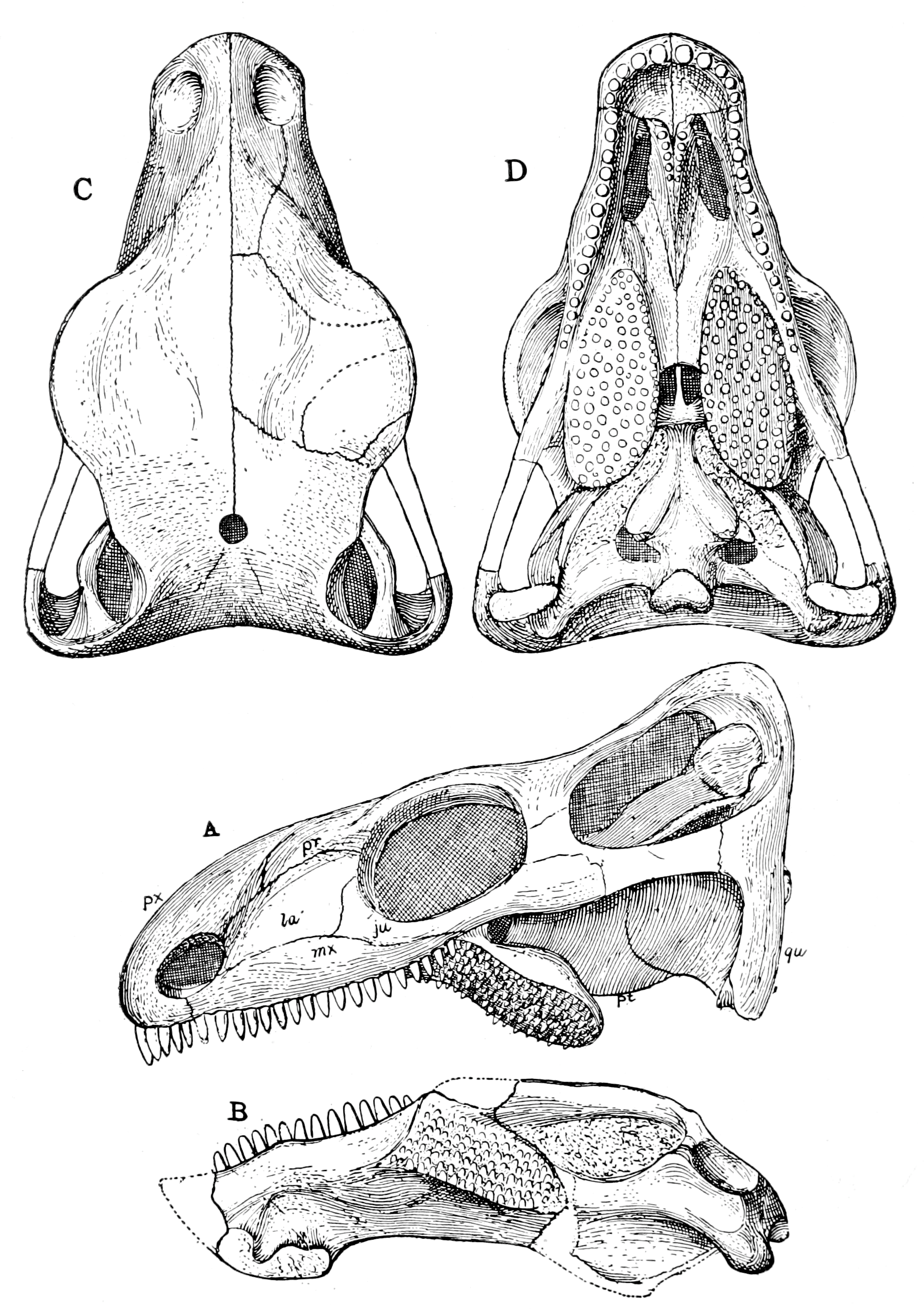
Skull and lower jaw of Edaphosaurus, showing the development of a battery of palatal teeth on the pterygoid, ectopterygoid and palatine bones, along with a corresponding interlocking battery on the lower jaw, used to grind high fiber plant material

Size of Ianthasaurus compared to a human hand

Size of various Edaphosaurus species compared to a human

Edaphosaurids saw a transition from being small insectivores/carnivores in the most primitive members of the group like Ianthasaurus, towards being large specialised herbivores in later members of the group like Edaphosaurus. They were the earliest known herbivorous amniotes and, along with the Diadectidae, the earliest known herbivorous tetrapods. The palatal dentition on the roof of the mouth changed from being relatively unspecialised in early members like Ianthasaurus, towards being modified into specialised raised batteries, which interlocked with a similar battery on the lower jaw in Edaphosaurus, which served to grind plant material. The upper surface of the body has a large neural spine sail formed from elongated neural spines of the back vertebrae, with this sail having varied from semi-circular to sloping at the front. The neural spines at the front of the sail generally lean forwards (anteriorly), while those towards the back of the sail lean posteriorly. The elongate neural spines of the sail had laterally (facing directly outwards to the side) directed tuberculate growths, unlike the neural spines of sphenacodontids like Dimetrodon. These tubercules vary considerably in the patterns of their arrangement between edaphosaurid species. The purpose of the sail is unknown, but have been variously suggested to have served for thermoregulation (though the supporting evidence for this has been criticised), defense, individual/species recognition, and/or display for intraspecific competition.

== Classification ==
The interrelationships of Edaphosauridae was investigated in details by David M. Mazierski and Robert R. Reisz (2010). The cladogram below is modified after their phylogenetic analysis.

- Edaphosauridae
  - Ianthasaurus hardestiorum
  - - Glaucosaurus megalops
    - Lupeosaurus kayi
    - - Edaphosaurus novomexicanus
      - - Edaphosaurus colohistion
        - - Edaphosaurus boanerges
          - - Edaphosaurus cruciger
            - Edaphosaurus pogonias

Edaphosauridae is generally placed as closely related to Sphenacodontia as part of the clade Sphenacomorpha. Below is a cladogram modified from the analysis of Benson (2012):

- - Tseajaia campi
  - Limnoscelis paludis
  - Amniota
    - - Captorhinus spp.
      - Protorothyris archeri
    - Synapsida
      - - Ophiacodontidae
        - Varanopidae
      - - Caseasauria
        - - Ianthodon schultzei
          - - Edaphosauridae
              - Ianthasaurus hardestiorum
              - - Glaucosaurus megalops
                - Lupeosaurus kayi
                - - Edaphosaurus boanerges
                  - Edaphosaurus novomexicanus
            - Sphenacodontia
              - Haptodus garnettensis
              - - Pantelosaurus saxonicus
                - - Therapsida
                  - Sphenacodontidae
