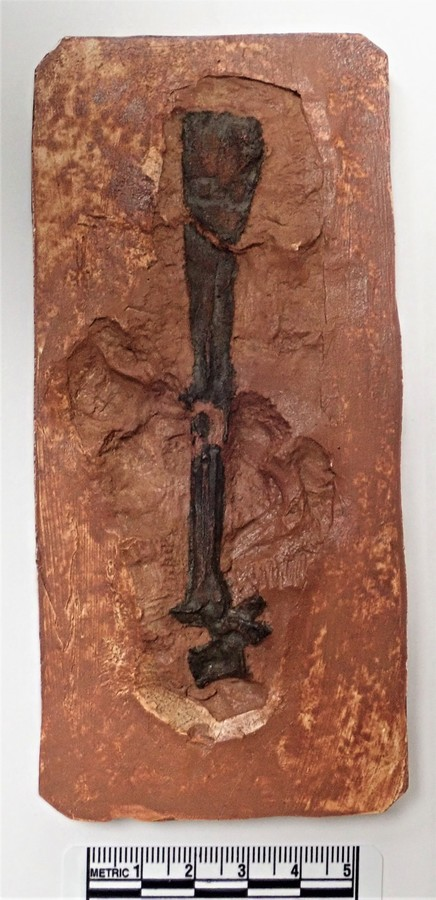
- Holotype cervical vertebra at the University of California Museum of Paleontology

Scientific classification
- Domain: Eukaryota
- Kingdom: Animalia
- Phylum: Chordata
- Clade: Synapsida
- Family: †Edaphosauridae
- Genus: †Xyrospondylus; Reisz, Heaton & Pynn, 1982

Type species
- †Edaphosaurus ecordi Peabody, 1957

= Xyrospondylus =

Xyrospondylus Temporal range: Late Carboniferous, Pennsylvanian (Missourian) ~302 Ma

Extinct genus of synapsids

Xyrospondylus is an extinct genus of non-mammalian synapsids belonging to the Edaphosauridae. The type species, X. ecordi, was named in 1982; it was originally named as a species of Edaphosaurus in 1957.

It lived during the Pennsylvanian (Missourian) in Kansas and possibly also Colorado and the holotype is known from a single cervical vertebra found in the Stanton Formation. A second specimen, consisting of a fragmentary pelvis, is also known. A third specimen, known from Colorado, is known, but it probably does not pertain to Xyrospondylus.

== See also ==
- List of pelycosaurs
- List of therapsids
