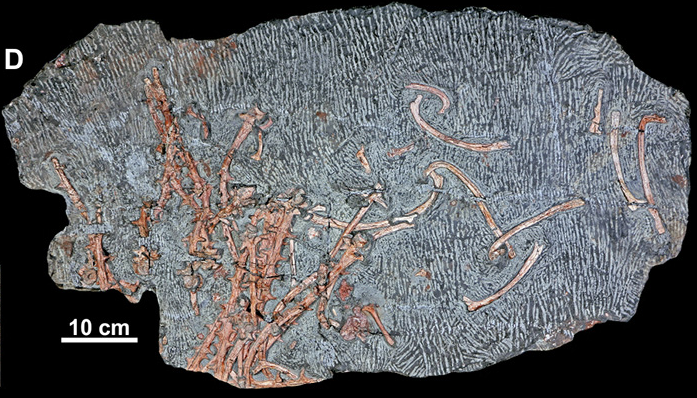
- Holotype specimen, UGKU 1997

Scientific classification
- Kingdom: Animalia
- Phylum: Chordata
- Clade: Synapsida
- Family: †Edaphosauridae
- Genus: †Remigiomontanus; Spindler, Voigt & Fischer, 2019

Type species
- †Remigiomontanus robustus Spindler, Voigt & Fischer, 2019

= Remigiomontanus =

Remigiomontanus Temporal range: 300–298 Ma Late Carboniferous - Early Permian

Extinct genus of synapsids

Remigiomontanus is an extinct genus of non-mammalian synapsids belonging to the Edaphosauridae. The type species is R. robustus.
