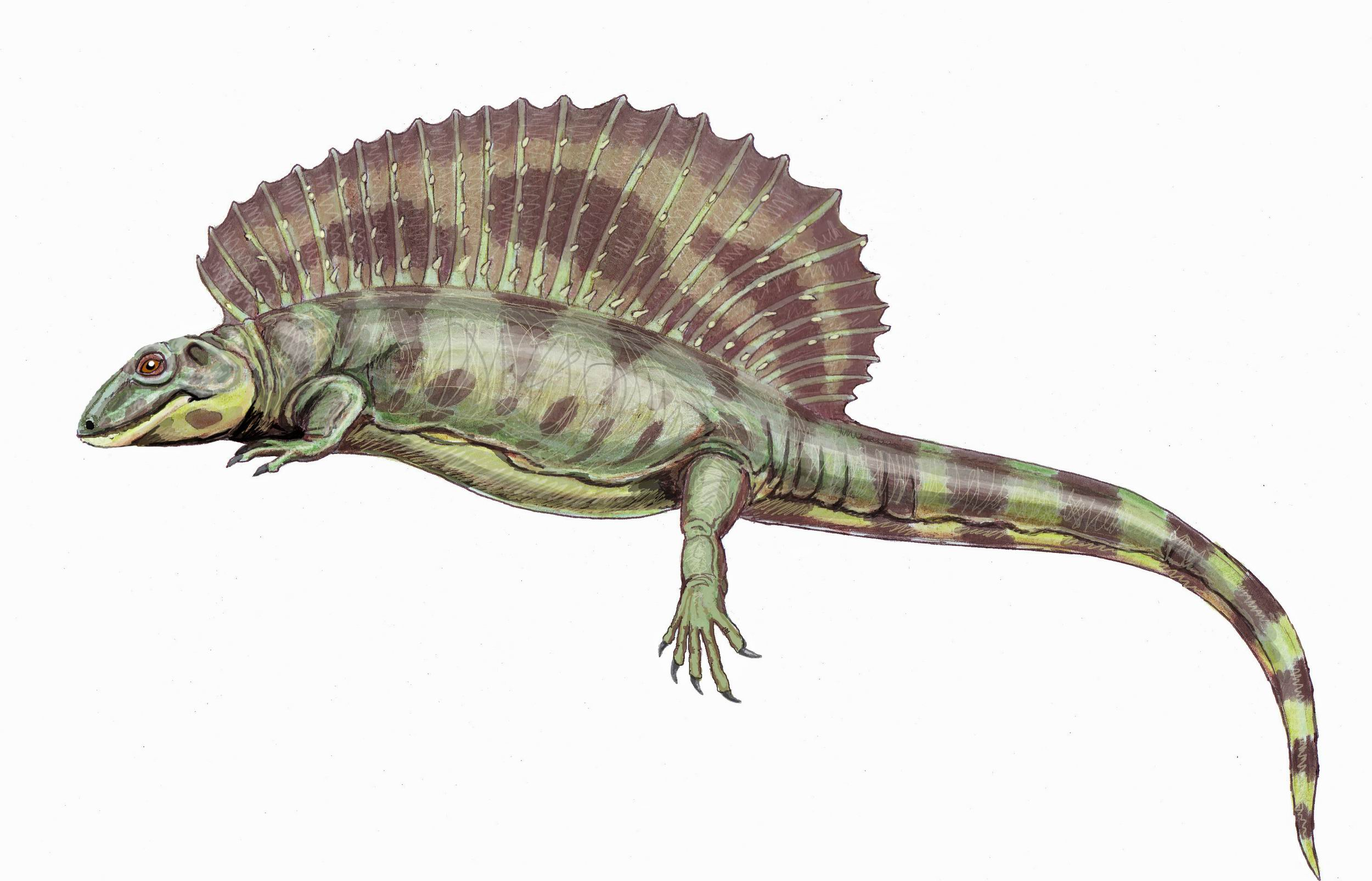
- Life restoration

Scientific classification
- Kingdom: Animalia
- Phylum: Chordata
- Clade: Synapsida
- Family: †Edaphosauridae
- Genus: †Ianthasaurus; Reisz and Berman, 1986

Type species
- †Ianthasaurus hardestii Reisz & Berman, 1986

= Ianthasaurus =

Ianthasaurus Temporal range: Late Carboniferous, ~304 Ma

Extinct genus of synapsids

Ianthasaurus is an extinct genus of small edaphosaurids from the Late Carboniferous.

== Description ==
Size comparison

It is one of the smallest edaphosaurids known, with an 8 cm (3.1 in) skull and a total body length of 75 cm (30 in). Ianthasaurus lacks many of the spectacular specializations seen in Edaphosaurus. For example, the marginal dentition of Ianthasaurus is similar to that of insectivorous reptiles, with slender conical teeth which are slightly recurved at the tips, and there is a slight development of a caniniform region. The palatal and mandibular dentition is unspecialized, and there are no batteries of teeth for crushing of plant materials. Also unlike Edaphosaurus, Ianthasaurus was lightly built and was probably quite agile. The skull was similar to that of Haptodus, a sphenacodontid, though they were distantly related.

Unlike later edaphosaurids, Ianthasaurus is suggested to have been a carnivore/insectivore.

== Discovery ==
It was named by Robert R. Reisz and David Berman in 1986. It was discovered by them in the Upper Pennsylvanian Rock Lake Shale near Garnett, Kansas.

== See also ==
- List of pelycosaurs
