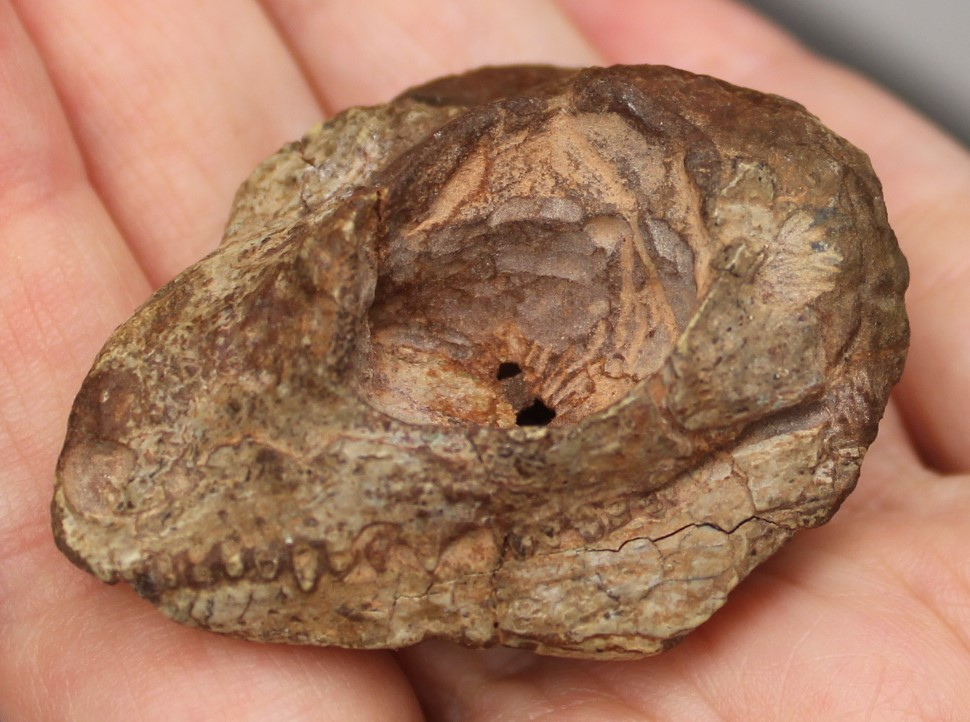
- Holotype skull at the Field Museum of Natural History

Scientific classification
- Kingdom: Animalia
- Phylum: Chordata
- Clade: Synapsida
- Family: †Edaphosauridae
- Genus: †Glaucosaurus; Williston, 1915

Type species
- †Glaucosaurus megalops Williston, 1915

= Glaucosaurus =

Glaucosaurus Temporal range: Early Permian, 285 Ma

Extinct genus of synapsids

Glaucosaurus is an extinct genus of edaphosaurid synapsid from the Early Permian of Texas. The type species, G. megalops, was named in 1915.

== Classification ==
Glaucosaurus is known only from its holotype, a partial skull and jaw. Almost all of the sutures have been obliterated. Nevertheless, there is broad agreement that Glaucosaurus is not only an edaphosaurid, but a close relative of Edaphosaurus itself.

All of the known sphenacodonts are carnivores except for certain therapsids. Glaucosaurus is plainly not a therapsid, e.g. because the lacrimal reaches the naris, the septomaxilla is large, there are no incisors, etc. And it is just as plainly not a carnivore, since it lacks cutting edges on the teeth or canine-like teeth. So, it is very likely to be an edaphosaur. Assuming that this is the case, it is very close to Edaphosaurus, because only Glaucosaurus and Edaphosaurus completely lack both canine teeth and a canine buttress, lack the transverse flange of the pterygoid, and have prefrontal with a ventral (descending) process which is expanded toward the middle of the skull, forming an anterior housing for the eyeball. However, Glaucosaurus differs from any of the known sorts of Edaphosaurus in have an incredibly long maxilla, and in the equally extreme length of the prefrontal's ventral process.

== See also ==
- List of pelycosaurs
