= Neural spine sail =

Anatomical feature in some tetrapods

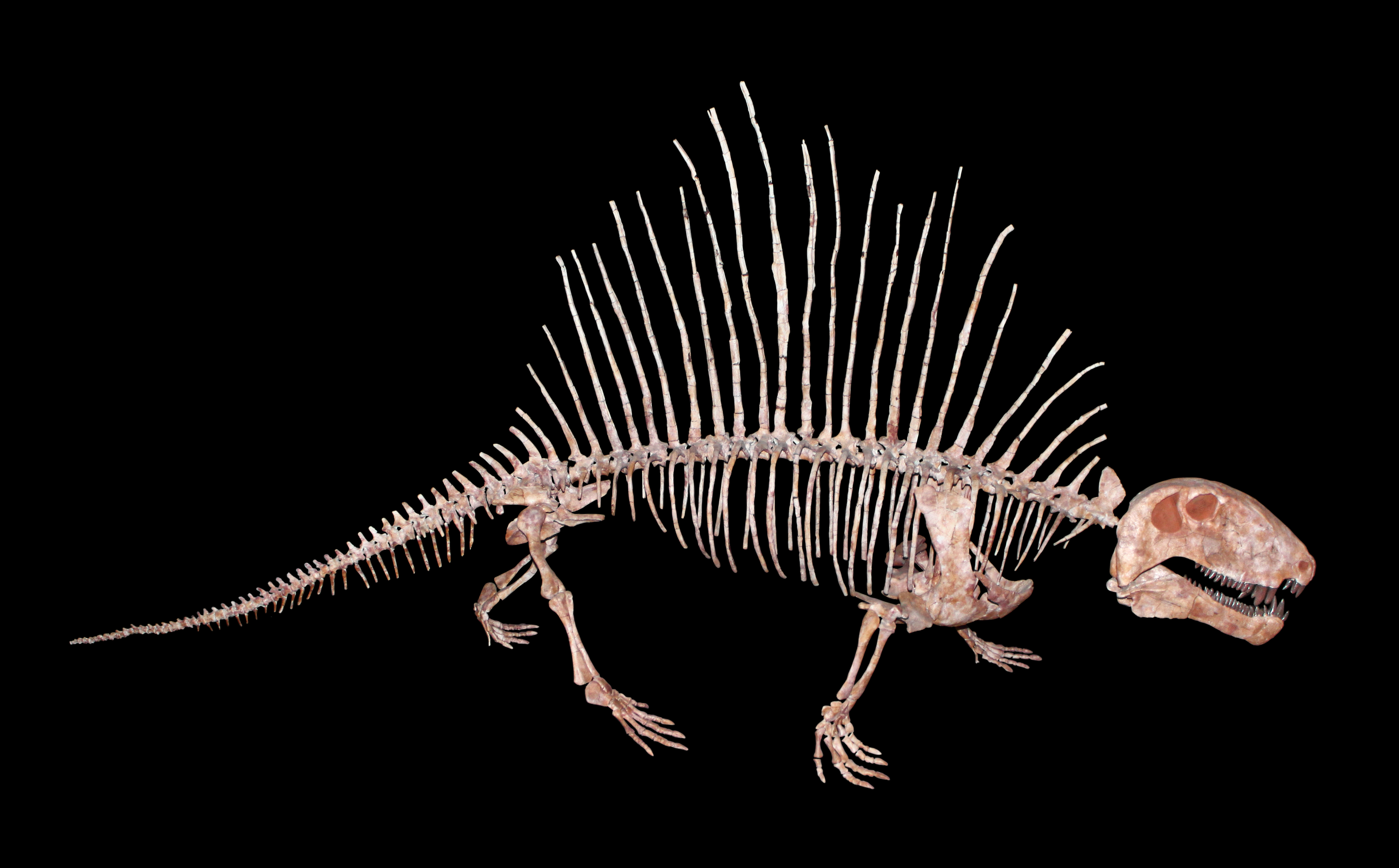
Mounted skeleton of Dimetrodon limbatus

A neural spine sail is a large, flattish protrusion from the back of an animal formed of a sequence of extended vertebral spinous processes and associated tissues. Such structures are comparatively rare in modern animals, but have been identified in a number of extinct species of amphibians and amniotes. Paleontologists have proposed a number of ways in which the sail could have functioned in life.

== Function ==
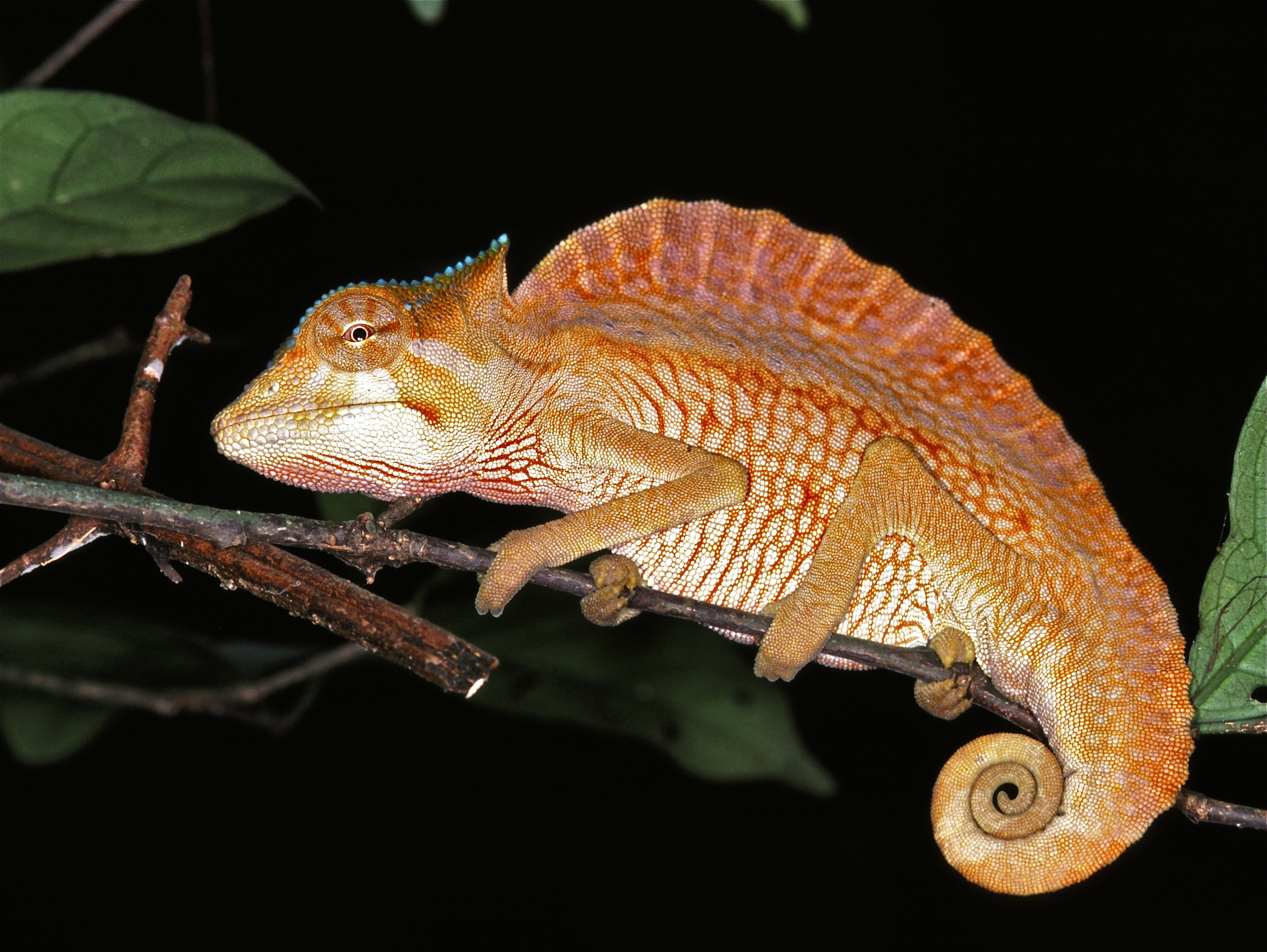
Crested chameleon, an extant reptile with a sail on its back

Varying suggestions have been made for the function of the sail.

=== Thermoregulation ===
The structure may have been used for thermoregulation. The base of the spines have a channel which may have contained a blood vessel supplying abundant blood to the sail. The animal could have used the sail's large surface area to absorb heat from the sun in the morning. As ectotherms they required heat from an external source before their muscles would start to function properly. A predator would thus have an advantage over its slower moving prey. The sail could be used in reverse if the animal was overheating. By standing in the shade, the sail would radiate heat outwards.

However, recent studies have put in doubt the efficiency of this purported means of thermoregulation, and indeed no extinct sailed animal is currently assumed to have used its sails for thermoregulation.

=== Sexual selection ===
Elaborate body structures of many modern-day animals usually serve to attract members of the opposite sex during mating. This has been proposed as one potential function of the sail.

=== Food storage ===
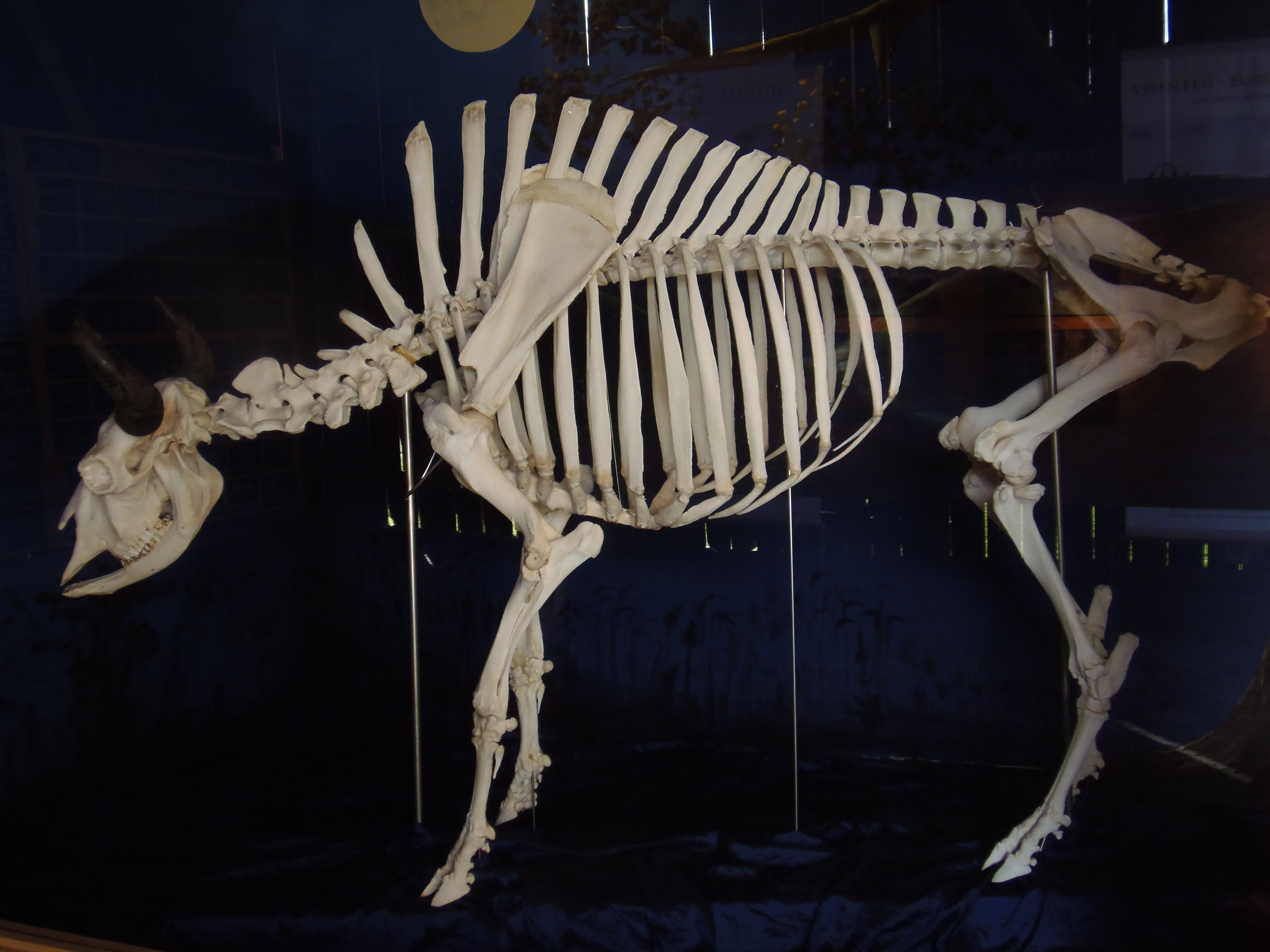
The tall neural spines of a bison form a hump rather than a sail.

The structure may also have been more hump-like than sail-like, as noted by Stromer in 1915 ("one might rather think of the existence of a large hump of fat [German: Fettbuckel], to which the [neural spines] gave internal support") and by Jack Bowman Bailey in 1997. In support of his "buffalo-back" hypothesis, Bailey argued that in Spinosaurus, Ouranosaurus, and other dinosaurs with long neural spines, the spines were relatively shorter and thicker than the spines of pelycosaurs (which were known to have sails); instead, the dinosaurs' neural spines were similar to the neural spines of extinct hump-backed mammals such as Megacerops and Bison latifrons.

=== Camouflage ===
Dimetrodon may have used the sail on its back to help camouflage itself when hiding among reeds and waiting to ambush its prey.

=== Sound display ===
Gregory Paul argued that parallel neck sails of Amargasaurus would have reduced neck flexion. Instead, he proposed that, with their circular rather than flat cross-sections, these spines were more likely covered with a horny sheath. He also suggests that they could have been clattered together for a sound display. In 2022, a detailed study was published by Cerda et al. analyzing the structure, morphology, and microanatomy of the vertebral spines of Amargasaurus. They suggested that the spines were not covered in a keratinous sheath as previously believed. Osteohistology of the spines suggests that they were likely, if not exclusively, covered in a sail of skin. The spines are also highly vascularized and bear cyclical growth marks, adding credence to this theory.

== List of organisms with a sail ==
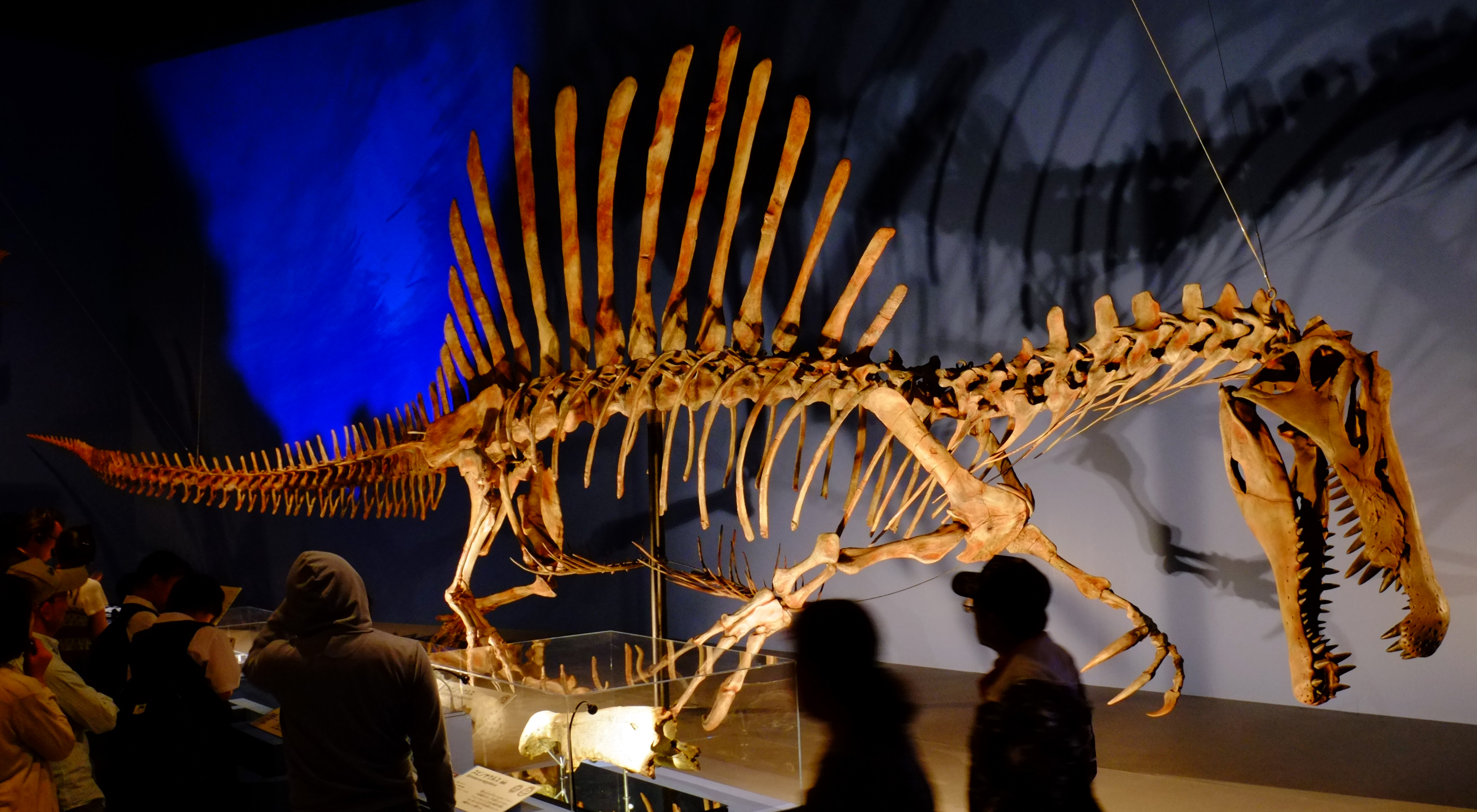
Spinosaurus, a dinosaur with a sail

=== Amphibians ===
- Platyhystrix 299–279.5 Mya

=== Amniotes ===
- Many Synapsids
  - Edaphosaurids ~307–272 Ma
  - Sphenacodontids 300–272 Ma
- Many Poposauroids
  - Ctenosauriscids 247.5–237 Ma
  - Lotosaurids 238.0 Ma
- Certain dinosaurs
  - Dicraeosaurid sauropods
    - Bajadasaurus ~145–132.9 Ma
    - Pilmatueia Early Cretaceous, Valanginian 137.05-132.6 Ma
    - Amargasaurus 130–120 Ma
  - Carcharodontosaurian / allosauroid theropods
    - Acrocanthosaurus 125–99.6 Ma
    - Concavenator ~125 Ma
  - Iguanodontian ornithopods
    - Istiorachis Early Cretaceous, Barremian 125.77-121.4 Ma
    - Ouranosaurus Early Cretaceous, Aptian–Albian 121.4-100.5 Ma
  - Spinosaurid theropods
    - Ichthyovenator 120–113 Ma
    - Suchomimus ~112 Ma
    - Spinosaurus Late Cretaceous, Cenomanian 100.5-93.9 Ma
  - Rebbachisaurid sauropods
    - Rebbachisaurus 99–97 Ma
  - Ornithomimosaur theropod
    - Deinocheirus ~70 Ma
