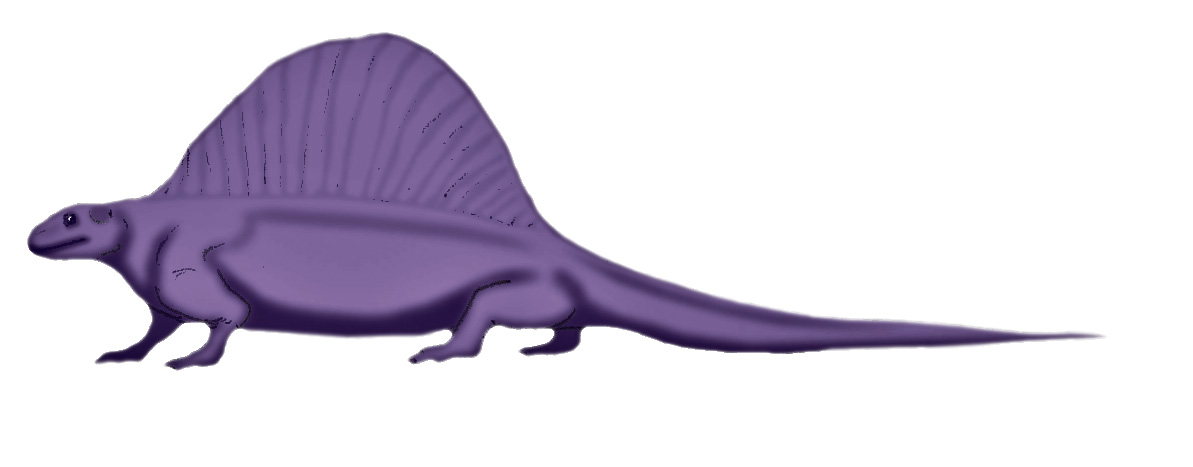
- Restoration

Scientific classification
- Kingdom: Animalia
- Phylum: Chordata
- Clade: Synapsida
- Family: †Edaphosauridae
- Genus: †Lupeosaurus; Romer, 1937
- Species: †L. kayi

Binomial name
- †Lupeosaurus kayi Romer, 1937

= Lupeosaurus =

Lupeosaurus Temporal range: Early Permian

Extinct genus of synapsids

Lupeosaurus is an extinct genus of pelycosaurian synapsids, assigned to the family Edaphosauridae. Lupeosaurus was about 3 metres (9.8 ft) long and weighed around 166 kilograms (366 lb). Its temporal range is from the Late Sakmarian to Early Kungurian.

== See also ==
- List of pelycosaurs
