= 2019 in paleontology =

Paleontology or palaeontology is the study of prehistoric life forms on Earth through the examination of plant and animal fossils. This includes the study of body fossils, tracks (ichnites), burrows, cast-off parts, fossilised feces (coprolites), palynomorphs and chemical residues. Because humans have encountered fossils for millennia, paleontology has a long history both before and after becoming formalized as a science. This article records significant discoveries and events related to paleontology that occurred or were published in the year 2019.

== Flora ==
=== Fungi ===
Name	Novelty	Status	Authors	Age	Type locality	Country	Notes	Images
Chaetosphaeria elsikii	Sp. nov	Valid	Pound et al.	Miocene	Brassington Formation	United Kingdom	A fungus, a species of Chaetosphaeria.	
Meliolinites neogenicus	Sp. nov	Valid	Khan, Bera & Bera	Late Pliocene to early Pleistocene	Kimin Formation	India	A fungus belonging to the family Meliolaceae.	
Meliolinites pliocenicus	Sp. nov	Valid	Bera, Khan & Bera	Pliocene	Subansiri Formation	India	A fungus belonging to the family Meliolaceae.	
Ophiocordyceps dominicanus	Sp. nov	Valid	Poinar & Vega	Burdigalian	Dominican amber	Dominican Republic	A fungus, a species of Ophiocordyceps. Announced in 2019; the final version of the article naming it was published in 2020.	
Ourasphaira	Gen. et sp. nov	Valid	Loron et al.	Mesoproterozoic – Neoproterozoic transition	Grassy Bay Formation	Canada	A process-bearing multicellular eukaryotic microorganism. Argued to be an early fungus by Loron et al. (2019). Genus includes new species O. giraldae.	
Palaeoglomus strotheri	Sp. nov	Valid	Retallack	Ordovician (Darriwilian)	Lenoir Formation	United States (Tennessee)		
Phomites neogenicus	Sp. nov	Valid	Vishnu, Khan & Bera in Vishnu et al.	Neogene		India	A fungus similar to members of the genus Phoma.	
Phomites siwalicus	Sp. nov	Valid	Vishnu, Khan & Bera in Vishnu et al.	Neogene		India	A fungus similar to members of the genus Phoma.	
Polycephalomyces baltica	Sp. nov	Valid	Poinar & Vega	Priabonian	Baltic amber	Russia (Kaliningrad Oblast)	A fungus belonging to the family Ophiocordycipitaceae. Announced in 2019; the final version of the article naming it was published in 2020.	
Priscadvena	Gen. et sp. nov	Valid	Poinar & Vega	Late Cretaceous (Cenomanian)	Burmese amber	Myanmar	A kickxellomycotine trichomycete in the new order Priscadvenales. Type species P. corymbosa.	
Prototaxites honeggeri	Sp. nov	Valid	Retallack	Ordovician (Darriwilian)	Lenoir Formation	United States (Tennessee)		
Rhexoampullifera stogieana	Sp. nov	Valid	Pound et al.	Miocene	Brassington Formation	United Kingdom	A fungus belonging to the group Ascomycota.	
Rhexoampullifera sufflata	Sp. nov	Valid	Pound et al.	Miocene	Brassington Formation	United Kingdom	A fungus belonging to the group Ascomycota.	

==== Paleomycological research ====
- Fossil sporocarps indistinguishable from sporocarps of members of the extant genus Stemonitis are described from the Cretaceous amber from Myanmar by Rikkinen, Grimaldi & Schmidt (2019).
- A study on the impact of major historical events such as the Cretaceous–Paleogene extinction event on the evolution of two major subclasses of lichen-forming fungi (Lecanoromycetidae and Ostropomycetidae) is published by Huang et al. (2019).
- Description of crustose lichens from European Paleogene amber is published by Kaasalainen et al. (2019).
- Fungi belonging to the genera Periconia, Penicillium and Scopulariopsis, representing the first and the oldest known fossil record of these taxa, are described from the Eocene Baltic amber by Tischer et al. (2019).

== Sponges ==
=== Research ===
- Sponge spicules and spicule-like structures that probably represent sponge fossils are described from four sections of the Ediacaran-Cambrian boundary interval in the Yangtze Gorges (China) by Chang et al. (2019).
- A study evaluating how distribution patterns of non-lithistid spiculate sponges changed during the Cambrian explosion and the Great Ordovician Biodiversification Event is published by Botting & Muir (2019).

=== New taxa ===
Name	Novelty	Status	Authors	Age	Type locality	Country	Notes	Images
Acanthochaetetes huauclillensis	Sp. nov	Valid	Sánchez-Beristain, García-Barrera & Moreno-Bedmar	Early Cretaceous (late Hauterivian to early Barremian)		Mexico	A chaetetid sponge.	
Allosacus pedunculatus	Sp. nov	Valid	Carrera & Sumrall	Ordovician	Lenoir Limestone	United States (Tennessee)	A member of the family Streptosolenidae.	
Auraeopirania	Gen. et comb. et 3 sp. nov	Valid	Botting et al.	Ordovician	Fezouata Formation; Llanfallteg Formation; Ningkuo Formation	China; Morocco; United Kingdom	A member of Protomonaxonida belonging to the family Piraniidae. The type species is "Pirania" auraeum Botting (2007); genus also includes new species A. pinwyddeni, A. pykitia and A. sciurucauda.	
Cannapirania	Gen. et 2 sp. et comb. nov	Valid	Botting et al.	Ordovician	Llanfawr Mudstones Formation; Wenchang Formation	China; United Kingdom	A member of Protomonaxonida belonging to the family Piraniidae. The type species is C. canna; genus also includes new species C. vermiformis', as well as "Pirania" llanfawrensis Botting (2004).	
Carduispongia	Gen. et sp. nov	Valid	Nadhira et al.	Silurian (Wenlock)	Coalbrookdale Formation	United Kingdom	A sponge, possibly a calcareous sponge. The type species is C. pedicula.	
Centrosia clavata	Sp. nov	Valid	Świerczewska-Gładysz, Jurkowska & Niedźwiedzki	Late Cretaceous (late Turonian)	Opole Basin	Poland	A hexactinellid sponge belonging to the family Callodictyonidae.	
Crateromorpha opolensis	Sp. nov	Valid	Świerczewska-Gładysz, Jurkowska & Niedźwiedzki	Late Cretaceous (late Turonian and early Coniacian)	Opole Basin	Poland	A hexactinellid sponge belonging to the family Rossellidae.	
Cystostroma primordia	Sp. nov	Valid	Jeon et al.	Ordovician (Floian to Darriwilian)	Duwibong Formation; Hunghuayuan Formation	China; South Korea	A member of Stromatoporoidea.	
Eoghanospongia	Gen. et sp. nov	Valid	Botting et al.	Silurian (Telychian)		United Kingdom	A hexactinellid sponge. Genus includes new species E. carlinslowpensis. Announced in 2019; the final version of the article naming it was published in 2020.	
Hamptonia jianhensis	Sp. nov	Valid	Wang et al.	Cambrian Stage 4		China	A sponge.	
Jianhella	Gen. et sp. nov	Valid	Wang et al.	Cambrian Stage 4	Balang Formation	China	A leptomitid sponge. Genus includes new species J. obconica.	
Monoplectroninia malonei	Sp. nov	Valid	McSweeney, Buckeridge & Kelly	Early Miocene	Batesford Limestone	Australia	A calcareous sponge belonging to the family Minchinellidae.	
Pachastrella rara	Sp. nov	Valid	Świerczewska-Gładysz, Jurkowska & Niedźwiedzki	Late Cretaceous (late Turonian)	Opole Basin	Poland	A demosponge belonging to the family Pachastrellidae.	
Palaeorossella	Gen. et sp. nov	Valid	Li et al.	Latest Ordovician		China	A rossellid hexactinellid sponge. Genus includes new species P. sinensis.	
Pellipirania	Gen. et sp. nov	Valid	Botting et al.	Ordovician (Tremadocian)	Fezouata Formation	Morocco	A member of Protomonaxonida belonging to the family Piraniidae. The type species is P. gloria.	
Pirania? ericia	Sp. nov	Valid	Botting et al.	Ordovician (Tremadocian)	Dol-Cyn-Afon Formation	United Kingdom	A member of Protomonaxonida belonging to the family Piraniidae.	
Pirania? peregrinata	Sp. nov	Valid	Botting et al.	Ordovician (Floian)	Ningkuo Formation	China	A member of Protomonaxonida belonging to the family Piraniidae.	
Pseudoleptomitus	Gen. et sp. nov	Valid	Botting et al.	Early Triassic		United States	A sponge belonging to the group Protomonaxonida and to the family Leptomitidae. Genus includes new species P. advenus.	
Rugocoelia loudonensis	Sp. nov	Valid	Carrera & Sumrall	Ordovician	Lenoir Limestone	United States (Tennessee)	A member of the family Anthaspidellidae.	
Subsphaerospongia	Gen. et comb. nov	Valid	Bizzarini	Late Triassic		Italy	A sponge; a new genus for "Stellispongia" subsphaerica Dieci, Antonacci & Zardini (1970).	
Teganiella finksi	Sp. nov	Valid	Mouro et al.	Carboniferous (Pennsylvanian)	Mecca Quarry Shale	United States		
Vasispongia	Gen. et sp. nov	Valid	Tang & Xiao in Tang et al.	Cambrian Stage 2	Hetang Formation	China	A sponge of uncertain phylogenetic placement. The type species is V. sinensis.	
Vauxia leioia	Sp. nov	Valid	Luo, Zhao & Zeng	Cambrian Stage 3		China	A vauxiid sponge.	

== Cnidarians ==
=== Research ===
- A study on the growth characteristics of three species of Ordovician corals belonging to the genus Agetolites from the Xiazhen Formation (China), and on their implications for inferring phylogenetic relationships of this genus, is published by Sun, Elias & Lee (2019).
- A study on a large colonial rugose coral from the Ordovician Kope Formation (Kentucky, United States) is published by Harris et al. (2019).
- A study on the morphology, growth characteristics and phylogenetic relationships of the Silurian tabulate coral Halysites catenularius is published by Liang, Elias & Lee (2019).
- Fossils of tabulate corals without septa, representing the first evidence that unmetamorphosed, slightly indurated Paleozoic sandstones crop out amidst the deposits of the Atlantic Coastal Plain Province of the United States, are reported from South Carolina by Landmeyer et al. (2019). This finding is strongly disputed because all other rocks of Paleozoic age in the study area are greatly metamorphosed, the rocks where the fossils were found are traditionally mapped as the Cretaceous Middendorf Formation, and it is suggested that the fossils in question are the bark of Cretaceous conifers in Cretaceous sandstone, instead of Paleozoic corals in Paleozoic sandstone.
- A study aiming to determine whether ecological selection based on physiology, behavior, habitat, etc. played a role in the long-term survival of corals during the late Paleocene and early Eocene is published by Weiss & Martindale (2019).
- Fossils of Acropora prolifera dating back to the Pleistocene are reported by Precht et al. (2019).
- A study on the distribution of reef corals during the last interglacial is published by Jones et al. (2019), who also evaluate the utility of fossil reef coral data for predictions of impact of future climate changes on reef corals.
- A study on a problematic fossil specimen from the Devonian Ponta Grossa Formation (Brazil), assigned by different authors to the species Serpulites sica or Euzebiola clarkei, is published by Van Iten et al. (2019), who interpret this fossil as a medusozoan capable of clonal budding, and transfer it to the genus Sphenothallus.
- The oldest mesophotic coral ecosystems, dating back to middle Silurian, from the Lower Visby Beds on Gotland have been described by Zapalski & Berkowski. These communities, dominated by platy corals give also clues about the onset of coral-algal symbiosis.
- Mihaljević (2019) describes new fossil coral collections from the Oligocene and Miocene of Sarawak (Malaysia), Negros Island and Cebu (the Philippines).
- A study on the anatomy, ontogeny and taxonomy of the Norian hydrozoan Heterastridium, based on data from fossil specimens from central Iran and south Turkey, is published by Senowbari-Daryan & Link (2019).

=== New taxa ===
Name	Novelty	Status	Authors	Age	Type locality	Country	Notes	Images
Amygdalophylloides omarai	Sp. nov	Valid	Kora, Herbig & El Desouky	Carboniferous (Moscovian)	Rod El Hamal Formation	Egypt	A rugose coral.	
Antillia coatesi	Sp. nov	Valid	Budd & Klaus in Budd et al.	Late Miocene–late Pliocene	Bowden Formation; Gurabo Formation; Mao Formation; Old Bank Formation	Dominican Republic; Jamaica; Panama	A coral belonging to the subfamily Mussinae.	
Aulopora chiharai	Sp. nov	Valid	Niko, Ibaraki & Tazawa	Devonian		Japan		
Bothrophyllum cylindricum	Sp. nov	Valid	Kora, Herbig & El Desouky	Carboniferous (Moscovian)	Rod El Hamal Formation	Egypt	A rugose coral.	
Bothrophyllum suezensis	Sp. nov	Valid	Kora, Herbig & El Desouky	Carboniferous (Moscovian)	Rod El Hamal Formation	Egypt	A rugose coral.	
Ceratophyllum simplex	Sp. nov	Valid	Liao & Liang	Devonian (Givetian)	Wenglai Formation	China	A rugose coral.	
Conopora alloporoides	Sp. nov	Valid	Cairns	Miocene (Messinian)		Spain	A member of the family Stylasteridae.	
Conopora forticula	Sp. nov	Valid	Cairns	Miocene (Messinian)		Spain	A member of the family Stylasteridae.	
Crypthelia ingens	Sp. nov	Valid	Cairns	Miocene (Messinian)		Spain	A member of the family Stylasteridae.	
Crypthelia zibrowii	Sp. nov	Valid	Cairns	Miocene (Messinian)		Spain	A member of the family Stylasteridae.	
Cyathophyllum wenglaiense	Sp. nov	Valid	Liao & Liang	Devonian (Givetian)	Wenglai Formation	China	A rugose coral.	
Cystiphylloides marennense	Sp. nov	Valid	Coen-Aubert	Devonian (Givetian)	Mont d'Haurs Formation	Belgium	A rugose coral belonging to the family Cystiphyllidae. Originally described as a species of Cystiphylloides, but subsequently made the type species of the separate genus Marennophyllum.	
Devonodiscus	Gen. et 2 sp. et comb. nov	Valid	Pedder	Devonian		Canada; Colombia; Russia; Australia? China? United States? Vietnam?	A coral. The type species is D. latisubex; genus also includes new species D. pedderi, "Combophyllum" multiradiatum Meek (1868), "Glossophyllum" discoideum Soshkina (1936) and possibly also "Hadrophyllum" wellingtonense Packham (1954) and "Glossophyllum" clebroseptatum Kravtsov (1975).	
Dirimia	Gen. et 6 sp. nov	Valid	Fedorowski & Ohar	Carboniferous (Bashkirian)		Ukraine	A rugose coral belonging to the family Kumpanophyllidae. The type species is D. multiplexa; genus also includes D. similis, D. recessia, D. composita, D. extrema and D. nana.	
Distichopora patula	Sp. nov	Valid	Cairns	Miocene (Messinian)		Spain	A member of the family Stylasteridae.	
Gyanyimaphyllum	Gen. et sp. nov	Valid	Wang et al.	Permian (Changhsingian)		China	A rugose coral. Genus includes new species G. crassiseptatum.	
Heritschioides simplex	Sp. nov	Valid	Fedorowski, Bamber & Richards	Carboniferous (Bashkirian)	Mattson Formation	Canada (Northwest Territories)	A rugose coral belonging to the group Stauriida and the family Aulophyllidae.	
Hispaniastraea ousriorum	Sp. nov	Valid	Boivin, Vasseur & Lathuilière in Boivin et al.	Early Jurassic (Pliensbachian)		Morocco	An anthozoan, possibly a member of Hexanthiniaria.	
Ipciphyllum floricolumellum	Sp. nov	Valid	Wang et al.	Permian (Changhsingian)		China	A rugose coral.	
Ipciphyllum naoticum	Sp. nov	Valid	Wang et al.	Permian (Changhsingian)		China	A rugose coral.	
Ipciphyllum zandaense	Sp. nov	Valid	Wang et al.	Permian (Changhsingian)		China	A rugose coral.	
Isophyllia jacksoni	Sp. nov	Valid	Budd & Klaus in Budd et al.	Late Miocene–early Pleistocene	Cercado Formation; Gurabo Formation; Los Haitises Formation; Mao Formation; Seroe Domi Formation	Curaçao; Dominican Republic	A species of Isophyllia.	
Isophyllia maoensis	Sp. nov	Valid	Budd & Klaus in Budd et al.	Late Miocene–early Pleistocene	Cercado Formation; Gurabo Formation; Isla Colón Formation; Mao Formation	Dominican Republic; Panama	A species of Isophyllia.	
Kumpanophyllum columellatum	Sp. nov	Valid	Fedorowski	Carboniferous (Bashkirian)		Ukraine	A rugose coral belonging to the family Kumpanophyllidae.	
Kumpanophyllum decessum	Sp. nov	Valid	Fedorowski	Carboniferous (Bashkirian)		Ukraine	A rugose coral belonging to the family Kumpanophyllidae.	
Kumpanophyllum levis	Sp. nov	Valid	Fedorowski	Carboniferous (Bashkirian)		Ukraine	A rugose coral belonging to the family Kumpanophyllidae.	
Kumpanophyllum praecox	Sp. nov	Valid	Fedorowski	Carboniferous (Bashkirian)		Ukraine	A rugose coral belonging to the family Kumpanophyllidae.	
Lepidopora fistulosa	Sp. nov	Valid	Cairns	Miocene (Messinian)		Spain	A member of the family Stylasteridae.	
Nemistium liardense	Sp. nov	Valid	Fedorowski, Bamber & Richards	Carboniferous (Bashkirian)	Mattson Formation	Canada (Northwest Territories)	A rugose coral belonging to the group Stauriida and the family Lithostrotionidae.	
Neorylstonia	Nom. nov	Valid	Vasseur et al.	Early Jurassic (Sinemurian to Pliensbachian)		Morocco	A stony coral belonging to the group Caryophylliina and the superfamily Volzeioidea; a replacement name for Mesophyllum Beauvais (1986).	
Octapyrgites	Gen. et sp. nov	Valid	Guo et al.	Cambrian Stage 2	Yanjiahe Formation	China	An olivooid medusozoan. Genus includes new species O. elongatus.	
Paraconularia kikapu	Sp. nov	Valid	Quiroz-Barroso, Sour-Tovar & Quiroz-Barragán	Permian	Las Delicias Formation	Mexico	A member of Conulariida.	
Paraconularia kingii	Sp. nov	Valid	Quiroz-Barroso, Sour-Tovar & Quiroz-Barragán	Permian	Las Delicias Formation	Mexico	A member of Conulariida.	
Pliobothrus nielseni	Sp. nov	Valid	Cairns	Miocene (Messinian)		Spain	A member of the family Stylasteridae.	
Pliobothrus striatus	Sp. nov	Valid	Cairns	Miocene (Messinian)		Spain	A member of the family Stylasteridae.	
Procteria (Granulidictyum) alechinskyi	Sp. nov	In press	Plusquellec	Devonian (Emsian)	Floresta Formation	Colombia	A tabulate coral belonging to the group Favositida and the family Micheliniidae.	
Scolymia meederi	Sp. nov	Valid	Budd & Klaus in Budd et al.	Late Pliocene	Tamiami Formation	United States	A species of Scolymia.	
Scolymia tamiamiensis	Sp. nov	Valid	Budd & Klaus in Budd et al.	Late Pliocene	Tamiami Formation	United States	A species of Scolymia.	
Septuconularia	Gen. et sp. nov	Valid	Guo et al.	Cambrian Stage 2	Yanjiahe Formation	China	A hexangulaconulariid. Genus includes new species S. yanjiaheensis.	
Sinkiangopora kawanoi	Sp. nov	Valid	Niko & Fujikawa	Permian	Zomeki Limestone	Japan	A tabulate coral.	
Stephanocoenia annae	Sp. nov	Valid	Löser	Early Cretaceous (Albian)		Mexico; United States	A stony coral belonging to the group Astrocoeniina.	
Stylaster digitiformis	Sp. nov	Valid	Cairns	Miocene (Messinian)		Spain	A species of Stylaster.	
Stylaster multicavus	Sp. nov	Valid	Cairns	Miocene (Messinian)		Spain	A species of Stylaster.	
Stylaster tuberosus	Sp. nov	Valid	Cairns	Miocene (Messinian)		Spain	A species of Stylaster.	
Thamnophyllum godefroidi	Sp. nov	Valid	Coen-Aubert	Devonian (Givetian)	Mont d'Haurs Formation	Belgium	A rugose coral belonging to the family Phillipsastreidae.	
Thamnopora sumitaensis	Sp. nov	Valid	Niko	Middle Devonian	Kamiarisu Formation	Japan	A tabulate coral belonging to the order Favositida and the family Pachyporidae.	
Trachyphyllia mcneilli	Sp. nov	Valid	Budd & Klaus in Budd et al.	Late Miocene–late Pliocene	Cercado Formation; Gurabo Formation; Mao Formation; Old Bank Formation; Seroe Domi Formation	Curaçao; Dominican Republic; Panama	A relative of the open brain coral.	
Waagenophyllum clisicolumellum	Sp. nov	Valid	Wang et al.	Permian (Changhsingian)		China	A rugose coral.	
Waagenophyllum gyanyimaense	Sp. nov	Valid	Wang et al.	Permian (Changhsingian)		China	A rugose coral.	
Waagenophyllum intermedium	Sp. nov	Valid	Wang et al.	Permian (Changhsingian)		China	A rugose coral.	

== Bryozoans ==
Name	Novelty	Status	Authors	Age	Type locality	Country	Notes	Images
Adeonellopsis keralaensis	Sp. nov	Valid	Sonar & Badve	Miocene (Burdigalian)	Quilon Beds	India	A cheilostome bryozoan.	
Aluis	Gen. et sp. nov	Valid	López-Gappa & Pérez	Miocene (Burdigalian)	Chenque Formation; Monte León Formation; Puesto del Museo Formation	Argentina	A cheilostome bryozoan belonging to the family Chaperiidae. Genus includes new species A. spinettai.	
Atlantisina mylaensis	Sp. nov	Valid	Rosso & Sciuto	Early Pleistocene (Gelasian)		Italy		
Ceriocava scholzi	Sp. nov	Valid	Martha et al.	Late Cretaceous (Santonian)		Germany	A putative cerioporine cyclostome.	
Characodoma multiavicularia	Sp. nov	Valid	Di Martino & Taylor in Di Martino et al.	Miocene		Indonesia	A species of Characodoma.	
Charixa bispinata	Sp. nov	Valid	Martha, Taylor & Rader	Early Cretaceous (Albian)		United States	A member of Cheilostomata.	
Charixa emanuelae	Sp. nov	Valid	Martha, Taylor & Rader	Early Cretaceous (Albian)		United States	A member of Cheilostomata.	
Charixa sexspinata	Sp. nov	Valid	Martha, Taylor & Rader	Early Cretaceous (Albian)		United States	A member of Cheilostomata.	
Devonavictoria	Nom. nov	Valid	Hernández	Devonian		Russia	A rhabdomesid bryozoan; a replacement name for Salairella Mesentseva (2015).	
Evactinopora mangeri	Sp. nov	Valid	Yancey et al.	Carboniferous (Mississippian)		North America	A member of Cystoporata.	
Gigantopora vartonensis	Sp. nov	Valid	Pedramara et al.	Miocene	Qom Formation	Iran		
Homotrypa niagarensis	Sp. nov	Valid	Ernst, Brett & Wilson	Silurian (Aeronian)	Reynales Formation	United States	A trepostome bryozoan.	
Hyporosopora keera	Sp. nov	Valid	Martha, Taylor & Rader	Early Cretaceous (Albian)		United States	A member of Cyclostomatida.	
Iyarispora	Gen. et 2 sp. nov	Valid	Martha, Taylor & Rader	Early Cretaceous (Albian)		United States	A member of Cheilostomata. Genus includes new species I. ikaanakiteeh and I. chiass.	
Lacrimula patriciae	Sp. nov	Valid	Di Martino & Taylor in Di Martino et al.	Miocene		Indonesia	An ascophoran-grade cheilostome.	
Leioclema adsuetum	Sp. nov	Valid	Ernst, Brett & Wilson	Silurian (Aeronian)	Reynales Formation	United States	A trepostome bryozoan.	
Leptotrypa lipovkiensis	Sp. nov	Valid	Tolokonnikova & Pakhnevich	Devonian (Famennian)	Zadonsk Formation	Russia	A trepostome bryozoan.	
Mesonopora bernardwalteri	Sp. nov	Valid	Martha, Taylor & Rader	Early Cretaceous (Albian)		United States	A member of Cyclostomatida.	
Micropora stellata	Sp. nov	Valid	Di Martino, Taylor & Portell	Pliocene (Piacenzian)	Tamiami Formation	United States	A species of Micropora.	
Microporella sarasotaensis	Sp. nov	Valid	Di Martino, Taylor & Portell	Pliocene (Piacenzian)	Tamiami Formation	United States	A member of Ascophora belonging to the family Microporellidae.	
Microporella tamiamiensis	Sp. nov	Valid	Di Martino, Taylor & Portell	Pliocene (Piacenzian)	Tamiami Formation	United States	A member of Ascophora belonging to the family Microporellidae.	
Moyerella parva	Sp. nov	Valid	Ernst, Brett & Wilson	Silurian (Aeronian)	Reynales Formation	United States	A rhabdomesine cryptostome bryozoan.	
Oncousoecia khirar	Sp. nov	Valid	Martha, Taylor & Rader	Early Cretaceous (Albian)		United States	A member of Cyclostomatida.	
Pinegopora chilensis	Sp. nov	Valid	Carrera et al.	Permian	Cerro El Árbol Formation	Chile	A member of Cryptostomata belonging to the group Rhabdomesina and to the family Nikiforovellidae.	
Pourtalesella chiarae	Sp. nov	Valid	Di Martino, Taylor & Portell	Pliocene (Piacenzian)	Tamiami Formation	United States	A member of Ascophora belonging to the family Celleporidae.	
Pseudidmonea debodeae	Sp. nov	Valid	Di Martino & Taylor	Early Miocene	Forest Hill Limestone	New Zealand	A pseudidmoneid cyclostome.	
Pseudidmonea oretiensis	Sp. nov	Valid	Di Martino & Taylor	Early Miocene	Forest Hill Limestone	New Zealand	A pseudidmoneid cyclostome.	
Pseudobathystomella mira	Sp. nov	Valid	Koromyslova, Martha & Pakhnevich	Late Cretaceous (late Maastrichtian)		Turkmenistan	A cheilostome bryozoan belonging to the superfamily Lepralielloidea.	
Ptilotrypa bajpaii	Sp. nov	Valid	Swami et al.	Ordovician (Katian)	Yong Limestone	India	A member of Cryptostomata.	
Reptomultisparsa mclemoreae	Sp. nov	Valid	Martha, Taylor & Rader	Early Cretaceous (Albian)		United States	A member of Cyclostomatida.	
Rhammatopora glenrosa	Sp. nov	Valid	Martha, Taylor & Rader	Early Cretaceous (Albian)		United States	A member of Cheilostomata.	
Simplicidium jontoddi	Sp. nov	Valid	Martha, Taylor & Rader	Early Cretaceous (Albian)		United States	A member of Ctenostomatida.	
Skylonia malabarica	Sp. nov	Valid	Sonar & Badve	Miocene (Burdigalian)	Quilon Beds	India	A cheilostome bryozoan.	
Spiniflabellum laurae	Sp. nov	Valid	Di Martino, Taylor & Portell	Pliocene (Piacenzian)	Tamiami Formation	United States	A member of Ascophora belonging to the family Cribrilinidae.	
Stenosipora? cribrata	Sp. nov	Valid	Di Martino & Taylor in Di Martino et al.	Miocene		Indonesia	An ascophoran-grade cheilostome.	
Stylopoma warkhalensis	Sp. nov	Valid	Sonar & Badve	Miocene (Burdigalian)	Quilon Beds	India	A cheilostome bryozoan.	
Tobolocella	Gen. et sp. nov	Valid	Koromyslova, Pakhnevich & Fedorov	Late Cretaceous (Maastrichtian)		Kazakhstan	A cheilostome bryozoan. Genus includes new species T. levinae.	
Trypostega composita	Sp. nov	Valid	Di Martino, Taylor & Portell	Pliocene (Piacenzian)	Tamiami Formation	United States	A member of Ascophora belonging to the family Trypostegidae.	
Uzbekipora	Gen. et comb. nov	Valid	Koromyslova, Martha & Pakhnevich	Late Cretaceous (late Campanian)		Uzbekistan	A cheilostome bryozoan belonging to the superfamily Lepralielloidea. The type species is "Porina" anplievae Favorskaya (1992).	
Vincularia taylori	Sp. nov	Valid	Sonar & Badve	Miocene (Burdigalian)	Quilon Beds	India	A cheilostome bryozoan.	

== Echinoderms ==
=== Research ===
- A study on the morphology and phylogenetic relationships of the putative stem-echinoderm Yanjiahella biscarpa is published by Topper et al. (2019); the study is subsequently criticized by Zamora et al. (2020).
- Soft tissue traces found in conjunction with skeletal molds are described in stylophorans by Lefebvre et al. (2019), who interpret their findings as supporting echinoderm and not hemichordate-like affinities of stylophorans.
- A study on the morphology and phylogenetic relationships of the lepidocystoid echinoderm Vyscystis is published by Nohejlová et al. (2019).
- A study on the phylogenetic relationships of diploporitan blastozoans is published by Sheffield & Sumrall (2019).
- A study on the morphology of the feeding ambulacral system in the Ordovician diploporitan Eumorphocystis, as indicated by data from well-preserved specimens from the Bromide Formation (Oklahoma, United States), is published by Sheffield & Sumrall (2019), who interpret their findings as indicating that Eumorphocystis was closely related to crinoids and that crinoids are nested within blastozoans; their conclusions about the relationship between Eumorphocystis and crinoids are subsequently contested by Guensburg et al. (2020).
- A study on the morphology and phylogenetic relationships of Macurdablastus uniplicatus is published by Bauer, Waters & Sumrall (2019).
- A study on the morphology and phylogenetic relationships of Hexedriocystis is published online by Zamora & Sumrall (2019), who consider this taxon to be a blastozoan.
- A study on the paleoecology of the specimens of the edrioasteroid Neoisorophusella lanei preserved in limestone slabs from the Carboniferous (Chesterian) Kinkaid Formation (Illinois, United States) is published by Shroat-Lewis, Greenwood & Sumrall (2019).
- A study on the morphology of Cupulocrinus and on its implications for inferring the origin of the flexible crinoids is published by Peter (2019).
- A study on the phylogenetic relationships of diplobathrid crinoids is published by Cole (2019).
- A study on the biological and ecological controls on duration of diplobathrid crinoid genera is published online by Cole (2019).
- A study on the macro-evolutionary patterns of body-size trends of cyrtocrinid crinoids is published by Brom (2019).
- A study on patterns of paleocommunity structure and niche partitioning in crinoids from the Ordovician (Katian) Brechin Lagerstätte (Ontario, Canada) is published by Cole, Wright & Ausich (2019).
- A study on the anatomy of the nervous and circulatory systems of the Cretaceous crinoid Decameros ricordeanus and on the phylogenetic relationships of this species is published online by Saulsbury & Zamora (2019).
- A study on the substrate preference in stem group sea urchins during the Carboniferous Period will be published by Thompson & Bottjer (2019).
- A study on Early Triassic recovery of sea urchins after the Permian–Triassic extinction event is published by Pietsch et al. (2019).
- A fossil brittle star belonging to the genus Ophiopetra, representing the first record of articulated brittle star from the Mesozoic of South America reported so far, is described from the Lower Cretaceous Agua de la Mula Member of the Agrio Formation (Argentina) by Fernández et al. (2019), who transfer the genus Ophiopetra to the family Ophionereididae within the order Amphilepidida.

=== New taxa ===
Name	Novelty	Status	Authors	Age	Type locality	Country	Notes	Images
Acanthocrinus carsli	Sp. nov	Valid	Ausich & Zamora	Devonian (Emsian)	Mariposas Formation	Spain	A camerate crinoid.	
Applinocrinus striatus	Sp. nov	Valid	Gale	Late Cretaceous		France; United Kingdom	A crinoid belonging to the group Roveacrinida and the family Saccocomidae.	
Archaeocidaris ivanovi	Sp. nov	Valid	Thompson & Mirantsev in Thompson et al.	Carboniferous		Russia	A sea urchin.	
Astrosombra	Gen. et sp. nov	Valid	Thuy, Gale & Numberger-Thuy	Late Cretaceous (Maastrichtian)		Germany	A brittle star belonging to the family Ophiopsilidae. The type species is A. rammsteinensis.	
Athenacrinus	Gen. et sp. nov	Valid	Guensburg et al.	Ordovician	Fillmore Formation	United States (Utah)	A crinoid belonging to the group Disparida. The type species is A. broweri.	
Becsciecrinus groulxi	Sp. nov	Valid	Ausich & Cournoyer	Ordovician-Silurian boundary		Canada	A crinoid.	
Binocalix	Gen. et sp. nov	Valid	McDermott & Paul	Late Ordovician		United Kingdom	An aristocystitid diploporite. Genus includes new species B. dichotomus.	
Bucucrinus isotaloi	Sp. nov	Valid	Ausich & Cournoyer	Ordovician-Silurian boundary		Canada	A crinoid.	
Carstenicrinus	Gen. et comb. nov	Valid	Roux, Eléaume & Améziane	Late Cretaceous (Campanian and Maastrichtian) and Paleocene (Danian)		Denmark; Germany; Turkmenistan	A crinoid. The type species is "Apiocrinus" constrictus von Hagenow in Quenstedt (1876); genus also includes "Bourgueticrinus" baculatus Klikushin (1982) and "Bourgueticrinus" danicus Brünnich Nielsen (1913).	
Caveacrinus	Gen. et 2 sp. nov	Valid	Gale	Late Cretaceous (Turonian)		France; United Kingdom	A crinoid belonging to the group Roveacrinida and the family Roveacrinidae. The type species is C. asymmetricus; genus also includes C. serratus.	
Cholaster whitei	Sp. nov	Valid	Blake & Nestell	Carboniferous (Chesterian)	Bangor Limestone	United States	A brittle star.	
Conocrinus cahuzaci	Sp. nov	Valid	Roux, Eléaume & Améziane	Eocene (Bartonian)		France	A crinoid.	
Costatocrinus elegans	Sp. nov	Valid	Gale	Late Cretaceous		France; United Kingdom	A crinoid belonging to the group Roveacrinida and the family Saccocomidae.	
Costatocrinus erismus	Sp. nov	Valid	Gale	Late Cretaceous		France; United Kingdom	A crinoid belonging to the group Roveacrinida and the family Saccocomidae.	
Costatocrinus rostratus	Sp. nov	Valid	Gale	Late Cretaceous (Santonian)		France; United Kingdom	A crinoid belonging to the group Roveacrinida and the family Saccocomidae.	
Crassicoma cretacea	Sp. nov	Valid	Gale	Late Cretaceous (Turonian)		France; United Kingdom	A crinoid belonging to the group Roveacrinida and the family Saccocomidae.	
Crassicoma veulesensis	Sp. nov	Valid	Gale	Late Cretaceous (Santonian)		France	A crinoid belonging to the group Roveacrinida and the family Saccocomidae.	
Culicocrinus breimeri	Sp. nov	Valid	Ausich & Zamora	Devonian (Emsian)	Mariposas Formation	Spain	A camerate crinoid.	
Dendrocrinus simcoensis	Sp. nov	Valid	Wright, Cole & Ausich	Ordovician (Katian)	Brechin Lagerstätte	Canada (Ontario)	A crinoid belonging to the group Cladida.	
Dentatocrinus	Gen. et 4 sp. nov	Valid	Gale	Late Cretaceous (Turonian)		France; United Kingdom	A crinoid belonging to the group Roveacrinida and the family Roveacrinidae. The type species is D. dentatus; genus also includes D. minutus, D. compactus and D. hoyezi.	
Drepanocrinus marocensis	Sp. nov	Valid	Gale	Late Cretaceous (Turonian)		France; Morocco; United Kingdom	A crinoid belonging to the group Roveacrinida and the family Roveacrinidae. Originally described as a species of Drepanocrinus, but subsequently transferred to the genus Striacrinus.	
Drepanocrinus striatulus	Sp. nov	Valid	Gale	Late Cretaceous (Turonian)		France; United Kingdom	A crinoid belonging to the group Roveacrinida and the family Roveacrinidae. Originally described as a species of Drepanocrinus, but subsequently transferred to the genus Striacrinus.	
Echinolampas veracruzensis	Sp. nov	Valid	Buitrón-Sánchez et al.	Oligocene	Coatzintla formation	Mexico	A sea urchin belonging to the family Echinolampadidae.	
Echinosphaerites dianae	Sp. nov	In press	Zamora et al.	Late Ordovician		Morocco	A rhombiferan blastozoan. Announced in 2019; the final version of the article naming it is not published yet.	
Eotiaris teseroensis	Sp. nov	Valid	Thompson et al.	Permian-Triassic boundary (latest Changhsingian–early Induan)	Werfen Formation	Italy	A sea urchin belonging to the group Cidaroida and to the family Miocidaridae.	
Euglyphocrinus	Gen. et comb. nov	Valid	Gale	Cretaceous (Albian and Cenomanian)		Morocco; United States (Texas)	A crinoid belonging to the group Roveacrinida and the family Roveacrinidae. The type species is "Roveacrinus" euglypheus Peck (1943); genus also includes "R." pyramidalis Peck (1943).	
Euspirocrinus hintsae	Sp. nov	Valid	Ausich, Wilson & Toom	Silurian (Rhuddanian)		Estonia	A eucladid crinoid.	
Falloaster	Gen. et sp. nov	Valid	Blake, Gahn & Guensburg	Ordovician (Floian)	Garden City Formation	United States (Idaho)	A member of Asterozoa of uncertain phylogenetic placement. Genus includes new species F. anquiroisitus.	
Gamiroaster	Gen. et sp. nov	Valid	Reid et al.	Early Devonian	Voorstehoek Formation	South Africa	A brittle star belonging to the family Protasteridae. The type species is G. tempestatis.	
Heloambocolumnus	Gen. et sp. nov	Valid	Donovan & Doyle	Carboniferous (Bashkirian)	Clare Shale Formation	Ireland	A crinoid. Genus includes new species Heloambocolumnus (col.) harperi.	
Hessicrinus primus	Sp. nov	Valid	Gale	Late Cretaceous (Turonian)		France; United Kingdom	A crinoid belonging to the group Roveacrinida and the family Roveacrinidae.	
Hessicrinus robustus	Sp. nov	Valid	Gale	Late Cretaceous (Coniacan)		France; United Kingdom	A crinoid belonging to the group Roveacrinida and the family Roveacrinidae.	
Hessicrinus thoracifer	Sp. nov	Valid	Gale	Late Cretaceous (Turonian and Coniacan)		France; United Kingdom	A crinoid belonging to the group Roveacrinida and the family Roveacrinidae.	
Homocystites adidiensis	Sp. nov	In press	Zamora et al.	Late Ordovician		Morocco	A rhombiferan blastozoan. Announced in 2019; the final version of the article naming it is not published yet.	
Hyattechinus anglicus	Sp. nov	Valid	Thompson & Ewin	Devonian (Famennian)	Pilton Mudstone Formation	United Kingdom	A sea urchin.	
Jovacrinus clarki	Sp. nov	Valid	Ausich & Cournoyer	Ordovician-Silurian boundary		Canada	A crinoid.	
Kalanacrinus	Gen. et sp. nov	Valid	Ausich, Wilson & Tinn	Silurian (Aeronian)		Estonia	A camerate crinoid. Genus includes new species K. mastikae.	
Konieckicrinus	Gen. et 2 sp. nov	Valid	Wright, Cole & Ausich	Ordovician (Katian)	Brechin Lagerstätte	Canada (Ontario)	A crinoid belonging to the group Cladida. Genus includes new species K. brechinensis and K. josephi.	
Lateranicrinus	Gen. et sp. nov	Valid	Ausich & Cournoyer	Ordovician-Silurian boundary		Canada	A crinoid. Genus includes new species L. saintlaurenti.	
Lebenharticrinus	Gen. et 3 sp. nov	Valid	Žítt et al.	Late Cretaceous (Cenomanian to Santonian)	Bohemian-Saxonian Cretaceous Basin	Czech Republic; France; Germany; Morocco; Tunisia; United Kingdom	A crinoid belonging to the group Roveacrinida. Genus includes new species L. canaliculatus, L. incisurus and L. ultimus.	
Lucernacrinus oculus	Sp. nov	Valid	Gale	Late Cretaceous (Santonian)		France; United Kingdom	A crinoid belonging to the group Roveacrinida and the family Roveacrinidae.	
Magnofossacrinus	Gen. et sp. nov	Valid	Mirantsev	Carboniferous (Moscovian)		Russia	A crinoid belonging to the family Poteriocrinidae. Genus includes new species M. domodedovoensis.	
Monostychia glenelgensis	Sp. nov	Valid	Sadler, Holmes & Gallagher	Miocene		Australia	A sand dollar.	
Monostychia merrimanensis	Sp. nov	Valid	Sadler, Holmes & Gallagher	Miocene		Australia	A sand dollar.	
Multisievertsia	Gen. et sp. nov	Valid	Müller & Hahn	Early Devonian		Germany	A member of Echinozoa belonging to the group Cyclocystoidea. The type species is M. eichelei.	
Oepikicrinus	Gen. et sp. nov	Valid	Ausich, Wilson & Toom	Silurian (Aeronian)		Estonia	A camerate crinoid. Genus includes new species O. perensae.	
Orthogonocrinus cantabrigensis	Sp. nov	Valid	Gale	Late Cretaceous (Cenomanian)		Germany; Morocco; United Kingdom	A crinoid belonging to the group Roveacrinida and the family Roveacrinidae.	
Paraconocrinus	Gen. et comb. et sp. nov	Valid	Roux, Eléaume & Améziane	Eocene		Italy; France; Spain	A crinoid. The type species is "Eugeniacrinus" pyriformis Münster in Goldfuss (1826); genus also includes "Conocrinus" cazioti Valette (1924), "Conocrinus" handiaensis Roux (1978) and "Conocrinus" romanensis Roux & Plaziat (1978), as well as a new species P. pellati.	
Perforocycloides	Gen. et sp. nov	Valid	Ewin et al.	Silurian (Telychian)	Jupiter Formation	Canada (Quebec)	A member of Echinozoa belonging to the group Cyclocystoidea. The type species is P. nathalieae.	
Platyhexacrinus santacruzensis	Sp. nov	Valid	Ausich & Zamora	Devonian (Emsian)	Mariposas Formation	Spain	A camerate crinoid.	
Plicodendrocrinus martini	Sp. nov	Valid	Ausich & Cournoyer	Ordovician-Silurian boundary		Canada	A crinoid.	
Plicodendrocrinus petryki	Sp. nov	Valid	Ausich & Cournoyer	Ordovician-Silurian boundary		Canada	A crinoid.	
Pliotoxaster buitronae	Sp. nov	Valid	Forner	Early Cretaceous (Aptian)	Margas del Forcall Formation	Spain	A sea urchin belonging to the family Toxasteridae.	
Pseudoconocrinus	Gen. et comb. nov	Valid	Roux, Eléaume & Améziane	Paleocene and Eocene		Crimean Peninsula; Denmark; France	A crinoid. The type species is "Conocrinus" doncieuxi Roux (1978); genus also includes "Democrinus" maximus Brünnich Nielsen (1915) and "Conocrinus" tauricus Klikushin (1982).	
Rhenopyrgus viviani	Sp. nov	Valid	Ewin et al.	Silurian (Telychian)	Jupiter Formation	Canada (Quebec)	A member of Edrioasteroidea.	
Roveacrinus bifidus	Sp. nov	Valid	Gale	Late Cretaceous (Cenomanian)		United Kingdom	A crinoid belonging to the group Roveacrinida and the family Roveacrinidae.	
Roveacrinus falcifer	Sp. nov	Valid	Gale	Late Cretaceous (Turonian)		France; United Kingdom	A crinoid belonging to the group Roveacrinida and the family Roveacrinidae.	
Roveacrinus ferrei	Sp. nov	Valid	Gale	Late Cretaceous (Turonian)		France; United Kingdom	A crinoid belonging to the group Roveacrinida and the family Roveacrinidae.	
Roveacrinus labyrinthus	Sp. nov	Valid	Gale	Late Cretaceous (Turonian)		France; United Kingdom	A crinoid belonging to the group Roveacrinida and the family Roveacrinidae.	
Rozhnovicrinus	Gen. et sp. nov	Valid	Ausich, Wilson & Toom	Silurian (Aeronian)		Estonia	A eucladid crinoid. Genus includes new species R. isakarae.	
Sagittacrinus transiens	Sp. nov	Valid	Gale	Late Cretaceous		France; United Kingdom	A crinoid belonging to the group Roveacrinida and the family Saccocomidae.	
Sagittacrinus tricostatus	Sp. nov	Valid	Gale	Late Cretaceous (Santonian)		France; United Kingdom	A crinoid belonging to the group Roveacrinida and the family Saccocomidae.	
Shoshonura	Gen. et sp. nov	Valid	Thuy et al.	Early Triassic		United States	A brittle star. Genus includes new species S. brayardi.	
Simcoecrinus	Gen. et sp. nov	Valid	Wright, Cole & Ausich	Ordovician (Katian)	Brechin Lagerstätte	Canada (Ontario)	A crinoid belonging to the group Cladida. Genus includes new species S. mahalaki.	
Sollasina cthulhu	Sp. nov	Valid	Rahman et al.	Silurian (Wenlock)	Coalbrookdale Formation	United Kingdom	A member of Ophiocistioidea belonging to the family Sollasinidae.	
Stellacrinus angelicus	Sp. nov	Valid	Gale	Late Cretaceous (Santonian)		United Kingdom	A crinoid belonging to the group Roveacrinida and the family Roveacrinidae.	
Stellacrinus delicatus	Sp. nov	Valid	Gale	Late Cretaceous (Santonian)		France; United Kingdom	A crinoid belonging to the group Roveacrinida and the family Roveacrinidae.	
Stellacrinus stapes	Sp. nov	Valid	Gale	Late Cretaceous (Coniacian)		France; United Kingdom	A crinoid belonging to the group Roveacrinida and the family Roveacrinidae.	
Tartucrinus	Gen. et sp. nov	Valid	Ausich, Wilson & Tinn	Silurian (Aeronian)		Estonia	A disparid crinoid. Genus includes new species T. kalanaensis.	
Thalamocrinus daoustae	Sp. nov	Valid	Ausich & Cournoyer	Ordovician-Silurian boundary		Canada	A crinoid.	
Totiglobus spencensis	Sp. nov	Valid	Wen et al.	Cambrian (Wuliuan)	Spence Shale	United States	A member of Edrioasteroidea. Subsequently transferred to the genus Sprinkleoglobus by Zamora, Guensburg & Sprinkle (2025).	

== Conodonts ==
=== Research ===
- A study on the feeding habits of conodonts, as indicated by data from calcium stable isotopes, is published by Balter et al. (2019).
- A study on the variation of conodont element crystal structure throughout their evolutionary history is published online by Medici et al. (2019).
- A study on the evolution of platform-like P_{1} elements in conodonts, evaluating its possible link to ecology of conodonts, is published by Ginot & Goudemand (2019).
- A study on the impact of early Paleozoic environmental changes on evolution and paleoecology of conodonts from the Canadian part of Laurentia is published online by Barnes (2019).
- A study on the morphology, occurrences and biostratigraphical value of Paroistodus horridus is published online by Mestre & Heredia (2019).
- A revision of the taxonomy and evolutionary relationships of the Late Ordovician genera Tasmanognathus and Yaoxianognathus is published by Yang et al. (2019).
- A study on the composition and architecture of the apparatus of Erismodus quadridactylus is published by Dhanda et al. (2019).
- A study on the ontogeny of the Lochkovian conodont species Ancyrodelloides carlsi is published by Corriga & Corradini (2019).
- A study on fossils of members of the genus Alternognathus from the Upper Devonian of the Kowala quarry (central Poland), attempting to calibrate the course of their ontogeny in days and documenting cyclic mortality events, is published by Świś (2019).
- The apparatus of Vogelgnathus simplicatus is reconstructed from discrete elements from a sample of limited diversity from the Carboniferous strata from Ireland by Sanz-López, Blanco-Ferrera & Miller (2019).
- Neospathodid conodont elements with partly preserved basal body (one of two main parts of conodont elements, besides the crown) are reported from the Lower Triassic of Oman by Souquet & Goudemand (2019), who interpret their finding as indicating that the absence of basal bodies in post-Devonian conodonts was due to a preservational bias only.
- Natural assemblages of conodonts, preserving possible impressions of "eyes", are described from the Lower Triassic pelagic black claystones of the North Kitakami Belt (Japan) by Takahashi, Yamakita & Suzuki (2019).
- A study on the composition of the apparatus of Nicoraella, based on data from clusters from the Middle Triassic Luoping Biota (Yunnan, China), is published by Huang et al. (2019).
- The architecture of apparatus of Nicoraella kockeli is reconstructed by Huang et al. (2019), who also evaluate proposed functional interpretations of the conodont feeding apparatus.
- A study on Middle Triassic conodont assemblages from Jenzig section of the Jena Formation and Troistedt section of the Meissner Formation (Germany) is published by Chen et al. (2019), who also study the morphology of the apparatuses of Neogondolella haslachensis and Nicoraella germanica, and review and revise the species Neogondolella mombergensis.
- A study evaluating the quantitative morphological variation of P_{1} conodont elements within and between seven conodont morphospecies from the Pizzo Mondello section (Sicily, Italy) and their evolution within 7 million years around the Carnian/Norian boundary is published by Guenser et al. (2019).
- A study on the taphonomy of basal tissue of conodont elements is published online by Suttner & Kido (2019).

=== New taxa ===
Name	Novelty	Status	Authors	Age	Type locality	Country	Notes	Images
Gnathodus lanei	Sp. nov	Valid	Lane et al.	Carboniferous	Bird Spring Formation	United States		
Icriodella iberiensis	Sp. nov	Valid	Voldman & Toyos	Ordovician (Katian)	Casaio Formation	Spain		
Palmatolepis chaemensis	Sp. nov	Valid	Savage	Late Devonian		Thailand		
Palmatolepis thamensis	Sp. nov	Valid	Savage	Late Devonian		Thailand		
Parapetella? guanyinensis	Sp. nov	Valid	Jiang et al.	Late Triassic (Carnian)		China		
Polygnathus serriformis	Sp. nov	Valid	Plotitsyn & Gatovsky	Devonian (Famennian)		Russia		
Polygnathus sharyuensis	Nom. nov	Valid	Ovnatanova et al.	Devonian (Famennian)	Sortomael' Formation	Australia; Russia	A replacement name Polygnathus mawsonae Ovnatanova et al. (2017).	
Polygnathus tenellus surinensis	Subsp. nov	Valid	Savage	Late Devonian		Thailand		
Polygnathus tsygankoi	Sp. nov	Valid	Plotitsyn & Gatovsky	Devonian (Famennian)		Russia		
Protophragmodus	Gen. et comb. nov	Valid	Zhen	Ordovician (Darriwilian and Sandbian)	Canning Basin; Glenwood Beds	Australia; United States	A new genus for "Phragmodus" polystrophos Watson, "Phragmodus" spicatus Watson and "Phragmodus" cognitus Stauffer.	
Siberigondolella	Gen. et comb. nov	Valid	Kiliç & Hirsch	Early Triassic		Canada; Russia	A member of the family Gondolellidae. The type species is "Neogondolella" composita Dagys (1984); genus also includes "Neogondolella" griesbachensis Orchard (2007), "Neogondolella" mongeri Orchard (2007); Siberigondolella altera (Klets), S. siberica (Dagys) and S. jakutensis (Dagys).	
Zieglerodina schoenlaubi	Sp. nov	Valid	Corradini et al.	Devonian (Lochkovian)		Italy		

== Synapsids ==
=== Non-mammalian synapsids ===
==== Research ====
- A study on the morphological diversity and morphological changes of the humeri of Paleozoic and Triassic synapsids through time is published by Lungmus & Angielczyk (2019).
- A study on the diversity of patterns of skull shape (focusing on the relative lengths of the face and braincase regions of the skull) in non-mammalian synapsids is published by Krone, Kammerer & Angielczyk (2019).
- Two pathologically fused tail vertebrae of a varanopid, likely affected by a metabolic bone disease closely resembling Paget's disease of bone, are described from the early Permian Richards Spur locality (Oklahoma, United States) by Haridy et al. (2019).
- Description of new skull remains of Echinerpeton intermedium and a study on the phylogenetic relationships of this species is published online by Mann & Paterson (2019).
- Fossil material of a large carnivorous synapsid belonging to the family Sphenacodontidae is described from the Torre del Porticciolo locality (Italy) by Romano et al. (2019), representing the first carnivorous non-therapsid synapsid from the Permian of Italy reported so far, and one of the few known from Europe.
- Description of the morphology and histology of a small neural spine from the Early Permian Richards Spur locality (Oklahoma, United States) attributable to Dimetrodon is published by Brink, MacDougall & Reisz (2019), who also report evidence from fossil teeth indicative of presence of a derived species of Dimetrodon (otherwise typical of later, Kungurian localities of Texas and Oklahoma) at the Richards Spur locality.
- A study on the histology of the skull roof of burnetiamorph biarmosuchians is published by Kulik & Sidor (2019).
- Femur of a specimen of the titanosuchid species Jonkeria parva affected by osteomyelitis is described from the Permian of Karoo Basin (South Africa) by Shelton, Chinsamy & Rothschild (2019).
- A study on the adaptations to herbivory in the teeth of members of the family Tapinocephalidae is published by Whitney & Sidor (2019).
- An almost complete skeleton of Tapinocaninus pamelae, providing new information on the anatomy of the appendicular skeleton of this species (including the first accurate vertebral count for a dinocephalian), is described from the lowermost Beaufort Group of South Africa by Rubidge, Govender & Romano (2019).
- Romano & Rubidge (2019) present body mass estimates for a well preserved and complete skeleton of Tapinocaninus pamelae from the lowermost Beaufort Group of South Africa.
- A study on the skull anatomy and phylogenetic relationships of Styracocephalus platyrhynchus is published by Fraser-King et al. (2019).
- A study on the evolution of the sacral vertebrae of dicynodonts is published by Griffin & Angielczyk (2019).
- A study on the diversity of dicynodonts from the Upper Permian Naobaogou Formation (China) is published by Liu (2019).
- A study on skulls of South American dicynodonts, aiming to determine whether the differences in skull morphology were related to differences in feeding function, is published by Ordonez et al. (2019).
- New fossil material of Endothiodon tolani is described from the Permian K5 Formation of the Metangula Graben (Mozambique) by Macungo et al. (2019).
- A study on the anatomy of the postcranial skeleton of Endothiodon bathystoma, based on data from a new specimen from the uppermost Pristerognathus Assemblage Zone of the Karoo Supergroup (South Africa), is published online by Maharaj, Chinsamy & Smith (2019).
- Small dicynodont skull assigned to the genus Digalodon is described from the Lopingian upper Madumabisa Mudstone Formation (Zambia) by Angielczyk (2019), expanding known geographic range of this genus.
- Digital endocast of Rastodon procurvidens is reconstructed by de Simão-Oliveira, Kerber & Pinheiro (2019), who evaluate biological implications of the endocast morphology of this species.
- Mancuso & Irmis (2019) describe an ulna of a member of the genus Stahleckeria from the Chañares Formation (Argentina), and evaluate the implications of this finding for the knowledge of the Triassic Gondwanan biostratigraphy and biogeography.
- A study on the body mass of Lisowicia bojani is published online by Romano & Manucci (2019).
- A study on fossils of a putative Cretaceous dicynodont from Australia reported by Thulborn & Turner (2003) is published online by Knutsen & Oerlemans (2019), who consider these fossils to be of Pliocene-Pleistocene age, and reinterpret it as fossils of a large mammal, probably a diprotodontid.
- A study aiming to determine patterns of morphological and phylogenetic diversity of therocephalians throughout their evolutionary history is published by Grunert, Brocklehurst & Fröbisch (2019).
- A study on variation in rates of body size evolution of therocephalians is published by Brocklehurst (2019).
- A study on the morphology of the manus of a new therocephalian specimen referable to the genus Tetracynodon from the Early Triassic of South Africa, and on the evolution of the manus morphology of therocephalians, is published by Fontanarrosa et al. (2019).
- A study on patterns of nonmammalian cynodont species richness and the quality of their fossil record is published by Lukic-Walther et al. (2019).
- A study on the morphology and bone histology of the postcranial skeleton of Galesaurus planiceps is published by Butler, Abdala & Botha-Brink (2019).
- Redescription of the anatomy of the skull of Galesaurus planiceps is published by Pusch, Kammerer & Fröbisch (2019).
- Description of teeth of all known diademodontid and trirachodontid cynodont taxa is published by Hendrickx, Abdala & Choiniere (2019), who also propose a standardized list of anatomical terms and abbreviations in the study of gomphodont teeth, assign Sinognathus and Beishanodon to the family Trirachodontidae, and consider all specimens previously referred to the species Cricodon kannemeyeri to be younger individuals of Trirachodon berryi.
- A study on the bone histology of the traversodontid cynodonts Protuberum cabralense and Exaeretodon riograndesis is published by Veiga, Botha-Brink & Soares (2019).
- Hypsodont postcanine teeth of Menadon besairiei are described by Melo et al. (2019), who also study patterns of dental growth and replacement in this species.
- Digital endocasts of Massetognathus ochagaviae and Probelesodon kitchingi are reconstructed by Hoffmann et al. (2019).
- A skull of a member of the species Massetognathus ochagaviae is described from the Carnian Santacruzodon Assemblage Zone of the Santa Maria Supersequence (Rio Grande do Sul, Brazil) by Schmitt et al. (2019).
- Description of brain endocasts of Siriusgnathus niemeyerorum and Exaeretodon riograndensis, using virtual models based on computed tomography scan data, is published by Pavanatto, Kerber & Dias-da-Silva (2019).
- Description of new fossil material of Siriusgnathus niemeyerorum from the Upper Triassic Caturrita Formation (Brazil) and a study on the age of its fossils is published online by Miron et al. (2019).
- A study on the evolution of infraorbital maxillary canal in probainognathian cynodonts and on its implications for the knowledge of evolution of mobile whiskers in non-mammalian synapsids, as indicated by data from skulls of non-mammalian probainognathian cynodonts and early mammaliaforms, is published online by Benoit et al. (2019).
- Digital skull endocast of a specimen of Riograndia guaibensis is reconstructed by Rodrigues et al. (2019).
- Description of the anatomy of the first postcranial specimens referable to Riograndia guaibensis is published by Guignard, Martinelli & Soares (2019).
- A study on the anatomy of the postcranial skeleton of Brasilodon quadrangularis is published by Guignard, Martinelli & Soares (2019).
- A study on tooth wear patterns of members of the family Tritylodontidae and on their possible diet is published by Kalthoff et al. (2019).
- Possible cynodont teeth, which might be the most recent non-mammaliaform cynodont fossils from Africa reported so far, are described from the Late Jurassic or earliest Cretaceous locality of Ksar Metlili (Anoual Syncline, eastern Morocco) by Lasseron (2019).
- A study on the origin of the mammalian middle ear ossicles, as indicated by the anatomy of the jaw-otic complex in 43 synapsid taxa, is published by Navarro-Díaz, Esteve-Altava & Rasskin-Gutman (2019).
- A study on the evolution of the morphological complexity of the mammalian vertebral column, as indicated by data from mammals and non-mammalian synapsids, is published by Jones, Angielczyk & Pierce (2019).

==== New taxa ====
Name	Novelty	Status	Authors	Age	Type locality	Country	Notes	Images
Arisierpeton	Gen. et sp. nov	Valid	Reisz	Permian (Artinskian)		United States	A member of the family Caseidae. The type species is A. simplex.	
Bohemiclavulus	Gen. et comb. nov	Valid	Spindler, Voigt & Fischer	Carboniferous (Gzhelian)	Slaný Formation	Czech Republic	A member of the family Edaphosauridae; a new genus for "Naosaurus" mirabilis Fritsch (1895). Announced in 2019; the final version of the article naming it was published in 2020.	
Cabarzia	Gen. et sp. nov	Valid	Spindler, Werneburg & Schneider	Permian (Asselian or Sakmarian)	Goldlauter Formation	Germany	A member of Varanopidae belonging to the subfamily Mesenosaurinae. The type species is C. trostheidei.	
Counillonia	Gen. et sp. nov	Valid	Olivier et al.	Most likely Early Triassic	Luang Prabang Basin (Purple Claystone Formation)	Laos	A Dicynodon-grade dicynodont. Genus includes new species C. superoculis.	
Dendromaia	Gen. et sp. nov	In press	Maddin, Mann & Hebert	Carboniferous		Canada (Nova Scotia)	A member of Varanopidae. Genus includes new species D. unamakiensis. Announced in 2019; the final version of the article naming it is scheduled to be published in 2020.	
Dicynodon angielczyki	Sp. nov	Valid	Kammerer	Late Permian	Usili Formation	Tanzania		
Gorynychus sundyrensis	Sp. nov	Valid	Suchkova & Golubev	Middle Permian		Russia	A therocephalian belonging to the family Lycosuchidae.	G. sundyrensis (bottom)
Hypselohaptodus	Gen. et comb. nov	Valid	Spindler	Permian (Cisuralian)		United Kingdom	An early member of Sphenacodontia; a new genus for "Haptodus" grandis. Announced in 2019; the final version of the article naming it was published in 2020.	
Jiufengia	Gen. et sp. nov	Valid	Liu & Abdala	Late Permian	Naobaogou Formation	China	A therocephalian belonging to the family Akidnognathidae. The Type species is J. jiai.	
Julognathus	Gen. et sp. nov	Valid	Suchkova & Golubev	Middle Permian		Russia	A therocephalian belonging to the family Scylacosauridae. Genus includes new species J. crudelis.	
Kembawacela	Gen. et sp. nov	Valid	Angielczyk, Benoit & Rubidge	Late Permian	Madumabisa Mudstone Formation	Zambia	A dicynodont belonging to the family Cistecephalidae. Genus includes new species K. kitchingi.	
Lisowicia	Gen. et sp. nov		Sulej & Niedźwiedzki	Late Triassic (late Norian-earliest Rhaetian)		Poland	A gigantic dicynodont reaching an estimated body mass of 9 tons. The type species is L. bojani. Announced in 2018; the final version of the article naming it was published in 2019.	
Mesenosaurus efremovi	Sp. nov	Valid	Maho, Gee & Reisz	Early Permian		United States (Oklahoma)	A member of Varanopidae.	
Pseudotherium	Gen. et sp. nov	Valid	Wallace, Martínez & Rowe	Late Triassic (Carnian)	Ischigualasto Formation	Argentina	A probainognathian cynodont closely related to tritylodontids. The type species is P. argentinus.	
Remigiomontanus	Gen. et sp. nov	Valid	Spindler, Voigt & Fischer	Carboniferous–Permian transition	Saar–Nahe Basin	Germany	A member of the family Edaphosauridae. Genus includes new species R. robustus. Announced in 2019; the final version of the article naming it was published in 2020.	
Repelinosaurus	Gen. et sp. nov	Valid	Olivier et al.	Most likely Early Triassic	Luang Prabang Basin (Purple Claystone Formation)	Laos	A kannemeyeriiform dicynodont. Genus includes new species R. robustus.	
Thliptosaurus	Gen. et sp. nov	Valid	Kammerer	Late Permian (Changhsingian)	Daptocephalus Assemblage Zone	South Africa	A late-surviving small dicynodont of the family Kingoriidae. Genus includes the new species T. imperforatus.	
Ufudocyclops	Gen. et sp. nov	Valid	Kammerer et al.	Probably Middle Triassic	Burgersdorp Formation	South Africa	A stahleckeriid dicynodont. Genus includes new species U. mukanelai.	
Vetusodon	Gen. et sp. nov	Valid	Abdala et al.	Permian (Lopingian)	Karoo Supergroup (Daptocephalus Assemblage Zone)	South Africa	A cynodont closely related to the group Eucynodontia. Genus includes the new species V. elikhulu.	

== Other animals ==
=== New taxa ===
Name	Novelty	Status	Authors	Age	Type locality	Country	Notes	Images
Adelochaeta	Gen. et sp. nov		Han, Conway Morris & Shu in Han et al.	Cambrian Stage 3	Chiungchussu Formation	China	A polychaete. The type species is A. sinensis.	
Alfaites	Gen. et sp. nov	Valid	Valent, Fatka & Marek	Cambrian (Drumian)	Buchava Formation	Czech Republic	A member of Hyolitha. The type species is A. romeo.	
Alulagraptus	Gen. et comb. nov	Valid	Chen et al.	Late Ordovician		China	A graptolite. Genus includes A. ensiformis (Mu & Zhang in Mu et al., 1963).	
Anomalocaris magnabasis	Sp. nov	Valid	Pates et al.	Cambrian Stage 4	Carrara Formation; Pioche Formation	United States	A member of Radiodonta. Originally described as a species of Anomalocaris, but transferred to the genus Houcaris in 2021.	
Archiasterella auriculata	Sp. nov	Valid	Moore in Moore et al.	Cambrian		United States (Nevada)	A chancelloriid sclerite.	
Archiasterella cometensis	Sp. nov	Valid	Moore in Moore et al.	Cambrian		United States (Nevada)	A chancelloriid sclerite.	
Archiasterella uncinata	Sp. nov	Valid	Moore in Moore et al.	Cambrian		United States (Nevada)	A chancelloriid sclerite.	
Bauruascaris	Gen. et 2 sp. nov	Valid	Cardia et al.	Late Cretaceous (Campanian/Maastrichtian)	Adamantina Formation	Brazil	An ascaridoid nematode described on the basis of fossil eggs preserved in crocodyliform coprolites. Genus includes new species B. cretacicus and B. adamantinensis.	
Bicingulites nanningensis	Sp. nov	Valid	Wei, Zong & Gong	Early Devonian	Nagaoling Formation	China	A member of Tentaculitida.	
Cambrachelous	Gen. et sp. nov	Valid	Geyer, Valent & Meier	Cambrian	Tannenknock Formation	Germany	A member of Hyolitha. Genus includes new species C. diploprosopus.	
Cambroraster	Gen. et sp. nov	Valid	Moysiuk & Caron	Cambrian	Burgess Shale	Canada; China	A radiodont belonging to the family Hurdiidae. Genus includes new species C. falcatus.	
Cephalonega	Nom. nov	Valid	Ivantsov et al.	Ediacaran		Russia	A member of Proarticulata; a replacement name for Onega Fedonkin (1976).	
Chancelloria australilonga	Sp. nov	Valid	Yun et al.	Cambrian Stage 4	Emu Bay Shale	Australia		
Chancelloria impar	Sp. nov	Valid	Moore in Moore et al.	Cambrian		United States (Nevada)	A chancelloriid sclerite.	
Chancelloria lilioides	Sp. nov	Valid	Moore in Moore et al.	Cambrian		United States (Nevada)	A chancelloriid sclerite.	
Cornulites sokiranae	Sp. nov	Valid	Vinn, Musabelliu & Zatoń	Late Devonian	Central Devonian Field	Russia	A member of Cornulitida.	
Costatubus	Gen. et sp. nov	Valid	Selly et al.	Ediacaran		United States	A cloudinid. Genus includes new species C. bibendi.	
Costulatotheca	Gen. et sp. nov	Valid	Earp	Early Devonian		Australia	A member of Hyolitha. Genus includes new species C. schleigeri.	
Cupitheca decollata	Sp. nov	Valid	Sun et al.	Early Cambrian	Yu'anshan Formation	China	A member of Hyolitha.	
Dahescolex	Gen. et sp. nov	Valid	Shao et al.	Cambrian (Fortunian)	Kuanchuanpu Formation	China	An animal which might be a stem-lineage derivative of Scalidophora. Genus includes new species D. kuanchuanpuensis. Announced in 2019; the final version of the article naming it was published in 2020.	
Daihua	Gen. et sp. nov	Valid	Zhao et al.	Cambrian Stage 3	Chiungchussu Formation	China	A member of the total group of Ctenophora. The type species is D. sanqiong.	
Dailyatia decobruta	Sp. nov	Valid	Betts in Betts et al.	Early Cambrian		Australia	A tommotiid belonging to the family Kennardiidae.	
Echinokleptus	Gen. et sp. nov	Valid	Muir et al.	Ordovician (Tremadocian)		United Kingdom	Agglutinated tubes most likely produced by a polychaete. Genus includes new species E. anileis.	
Gothograptus auriculatus	Sp. nov	Valid	Kozłowska et al.	Silurian		Germany; Lithuania; Poland; Sweden	A graptolite.	
Gothograptus diminutus	Sp. nov	Valid	Kozłowska et al.	Silurian		Poland	A graptolite.	
Gothograptus domeyki	Sp. nov	Valid	Kozłowska et al.	Silurian		Lithuania	A graptolite.	
Gothograptus velo	Sp. nov	Valid	Kozłowska et al.	Silurian		Poland	A graptolite.	
Grantitheca? klani	Sp. nov	Valid	Geyer, Valent & Meier	Cambrian	Tannenknock Formation	Germany	A member of Hyolitha.	
Harrisgraptus	Gen. et comb. nov	Valid	VandenBerg	Ordovician (Floian)		Australia	A graptolite belonging to the group Dichograptina and the family Pterograptidae. The type species is "Didymograptus" eocaduceus Harris (1933).	
Hexitheca washingtonensis	Sp. nov	Valid	Malinky & Geyer	Early Cambrian (Dyeran)		United States	A member of Hyolitha.	
Heydenius simulphilus	Sp. nov	Valid	Poinar & Currie	Eocene	Baltic amber	Europe (Baltic Sea region)	A nematode belonging to the family Mermithidae. Announced in 2019; the final version of the article naming was published in 2020.	
Ipoliknus	Gen. et sp. nov		Han, Conway Morris & Shu in Han et al.	Cambrian Stage 3	Chiungchussu Formation	China	A polychaete. The type species is I. avitus.	
Lonchidium cylicus	Sp. nov	Valid	Wei, Zong & Gong	Early Devonian	Nagaoling Formation	China	A member of Tentaculitida.	
Nectocotis	Gen. et sp. nov	Valid	Smith	Ordovician (Katian)	Whetstone Gulf Formation	United States (New York)	A relative of Nectocaris; an animal of uncertain phylogenetic placement, possibly a stem-cephalopod. The type species is N. rusmithi.	
Normalograptus baridaensis	Sp. nov	Valid	Štorch, Roqué Bernal & Gutiérrez-Marco	Ordovician (Hirnantian)		Spain	A graptolite.	
Normalograptus ednae	Sp. nov	Valid	Štorch, Roqué Bernal & Gutiérrez-Marco	Silurian (Rhuddanian)		Spain	A graptolite.	
Odessites aurisites	Sp. nov	Valid	Wei, Zong & Gong	Early Devonian	Nagaoling Formation	China	A member of Tentaculitida.	
Odessites nahongensis	Sp. nov	Valid	Wei, Zong & Gong	Early Devonian	Nagaoling Formation	China	A member of Tentaculitida.	
Paratriplicatella	Gen. et sp. nov	Valid	Pan et al.	Early Cambrian		China	A member of Hyolitha. Genus includes new species P. shangwanensis.	
Protomicrocornus	Gen. et sp. nov	Valid	Pan et al.	Early Cambrian		China	A member of Hyolitha. Genus includes new species P. triplicensis.	
Saarina hagadorni	Sp. nov	Valid	Selly et al.	Ediacaran		United States		
Shenzianyuloma	Gen. et sp. nov	Valid	McMenamin	Cambrian	Maotianshan Shales	China	A member of Vetulicolia. The type species is S. yunnanense.	
Sialomorpha	Gen. et sp. nov	Valid	Poinar & Nelson	Eocene or Miocene	Dominican amber	Dominican Republic	A small invertebrate of uncertain phylogenetic placement, sharing characters with both tardigrades and mites, but belonging to neither group. The type species is S. dominicana.	
Tentaculites brevitenui	Sp. nov	Valid	Wei, Zong & Gong	Early Devonian	Nagaoling Formation	China	A member of Tentaculitida.	
Triplicatella xinjia	Sp. nov	Valid	Pan et al.	Early Cambrian		China	A member of Hyolitha.	
Ursulinacaris	Gen. et sp. nov		Pates, Daley & Butterfield	Cambrian	Mount Cap formation Carrara Formation?	Canada; United States?	A radiodont belonging to the family Hurdiidae. The type species is U. grallae.	
Volynites nagaolingensis	Sp. nov	Valid	Wei, Zong & Gong	Early Devonian	Nagaoling Formation	China	A member of Tentaculitida.	
Yilingia	Gen. et sp. nov	Valid	Chen et al.	Late Ediacaran		China	An early bilaterian, possibly related to panarthropods or annelids. Genus includes new species Y. spiciformis.	

=== Research ===
- A study on moulds of animals belonging to the group Proarticulata from the southeastern White Sea area (Russia), and on their implications for the knowledge of the morphology of integuments of members of Proarticulata, is published by Ivantsov, Zakrevskaya & Nagovitsyn (2019).
- A study on accumulations of Ernietta from the Witputs subbasin (Namibia), and on their implications for the knowledge of ecology of these organisms, is published by Gibson et al. (2019).
- A diverse assemblage of tubular fossils – dominated by typical Ediacaran organisms such as Cloudina and Sinotubulites, but also preserving fossils showing similarities to early Cambrian shelly fossils – is described from the Ediacaran Dengying Formation (China) by Cai et al. (2019).
- Letsch et al. (2019) report late Ediacaran discoidal Ediacara-type fossils and latest Ediacaran to early Cambrian microfossils from the Tabia and the Tifnout members of the Adoudou Formation (Morocco), constituting the oldest known direct evidence for presumably animal life from Northwest Africa.
- A study delineating different types of the asexual reproduction for Cloudina and Multiconotubus is published by Min et al. (2019).
- A study on the anatomy of Charnia masoni is published by Dunn et al. (2019).
- A study evaluating whether Dickinsonia was capable of mobility is published by Evans, Gehling & Droser (2019).
- A study comparing the biomechanical responses of tissues of Dickinsonia to various forces with those typical of modern organisms is published by Evans et al. (2019).
- A study on the anatomy, growth and phylogenetic relationships of Arborea arborea is published by Dunn, Liu & Gehling (2019).
- Xiao et al. (2019) describe a new trace fossil from the Ediacaran Dengying Formation (China), interpreted as produced by a bilaterian animal exploring an oxygen oasis in microbial mats, and name a new ichnotaxon Yichnus levis.
- A study on fossil molds and casts from the Ordovician of Morocco and the Devonian of New York, as well as on Ediacaran mold and cast fossils from South Australia, the White Sea region of Russia, Namibia and Newfoundland, is published by MacGabhann et al. (2019), who evaluate how faithfully the fossils represent the original organisms, and whether the first animals to evolve on Earth could have been fossilized in a way similar to eldoniids from the Tafilalt Lagerstätte of Morocco.
- Exceptionally preserved phosphatized archaeocyaths and small shelly fossils are reported from the Lower Cambrian Salaagol Formation of southwestern Mongolia by Pruss et al. (2019).
- A study on the timing of the development of reef biodiversity, based on data from microbial-archaeocyathan reefs of the Salaagol Formation in Mongolia and other early Paleozoic reefs, is published by Cordie et al. (2019).
- A study on the morphological diversity of archaeocyaths is published by Cordie & Dornbos (2019).
- Evidence of extensive burrowing in laminated claystone from the Cambrian (Drumian) Ravens Throat River Lagerstätte in the Rockslide Formation (Canada) is presented by Pratt & Kimmig (2019).
- Description of jaw apparatus of Plumulites bengtsoni from the Fezouata Formation of Morocco, evaluating its implications for the knowledge of the phylogenetic relationships of machaeridians, is published by Parry et al. (2019).
- Description of internal anatomical features of Canadia spinosa identified as remnants of the nervous system is published by Parry & Caron (2019).
- A study on the chemical composition, morphology and phylogeny of fossil (Cenozoic, Mesozoic and Paleozoic) annelid tubes and tubes formerly thought to have been made by annelids, recovered from hydrothermal vent and cold seep environments, is published by Georgieva et al. (2019).
- A massive deposit composed of fossil serpulid worm tubes dating to the late Pleistocene is reported from the Santa Monica Basin off the coast of southern California by Georgieva et al. (2019).
- A study on the microstructure of hyolith conchs and opercula from the lower Cambrian Xinji Formation of North China, and on its implications for inferring the phylogenetic relationships of Hyolitha, is published by Li et al. (2019).
- Description of soft parts associated with the feeding apparatus of the hyolith Triplicatella opimus from the Chengjiang biota of South China, and a study on the implications of this finding for the knowledge of the phylogenetic affinities of hyoliths, is published online by Liu et al. (2019).
- A study on changes of conch size in tentaculitoids from the Silurian and Devonian strata is published by Wei (2019).
- A study on the anatomy of Amiskwia sagittiformis is published by Vinther & Parry (2019), who interpret two reflective patches present in fossils of this species, previously interpreted as paired cerebral ganglia, as a pair of pharyngeal jaws similar to those of gnathiferans.
- A study on the anatomy and phylogenetic affinities of Amiskwia sagittiformis is published by Caron & Cheung (2019).
- The oldest record of acanthocephalan parasite eggs described so far is reported from probable crocodyliform coprolites from the Upper Cretaceous Adamantina Formation (Brazil) by Cardia et al. (2019).
- Exceptionally preserved trace and body fossils are described from the Cambrian File Haidar Formation (Sweden) by Kesidis et al. (2019), who interpret these fossils as made by priapulid-like scalidophorans.
- Description of exuviae of microscopic scalidophoran worms from the lowermost Cambrian Kuanchuanpu Formation (China) is published by Wang et al. (2019), who interpret this finding as the oldest record of moulting in ecdysozoans reported so far.
- A reassessment of radiodontan fossils known from the Cambrian Kinzers Formation (Pennsylvania, United States) is published by Pates & Daley (2019), who argue that at least four radiodontan taxa are known from this formation, and confirm that Anomalocaris pennsylvanica is a distinct species from A. canadensis.
- A study on the moulting behaviour of the chengjiangocaridid fuxianhuiid Alacaris mirabilis is published by Yang et al. (2019).
- A study on the anatomy and phylogenetic relationships of a stem-arthropod Guangweicaris spinatus is published by Wu & Liu (2019).
- A fossil interpreted as a partial mold of a specimen of Paropsonema cryptophya is described from the Middle-Upper Devonian of New York by Hagadorn & Allmon (2019), representing the most recent occurrence of the paropsonemids reported so far.
- A study evaluating the utility of eye melanosomes for determination of the phylogenetic affinities of Tullimonstrum is published by Rogers et al. (2019).

== Foraminifera ==
=== Research ===
- A study on the morphological complexity of planktic foraminifer tests after the Cretaceous–Paleogene extinction event is published by Lowery & Fraass (2019).
- A study on the response of the larger benthic foraminifera from the Tethys Ocean to the Paleocene–Eocene Thermal Maximum, based on fossil evidence from south Tibet, is published by Zhang et al. (2019).

=== New taxa ===
Name	Novelty	Status	Authors	Age	Type locality	Country	Notes	Images
Acervoschwagerina gongendaniensis	Sp. nov	Valid	Kobayashi in Kobayashi & Furutani	Permian (late Cisuralian)		Japan	A member of Fusulinida.	
Ammodiscus jordanensis	Sp. nov	Valid	Gennari and Rettori in Powell et al.	Early and Middle Triassic	Ma'in Formation	China; Hungary; Jordan; Poland; Romania	A species of Ammodiscus.	
Bispiraloconulus	Gen. et sp. nov	Valid	Schlagintweit, Bucur & Sudar	Early Cretaceous (Berriasian)		Serbia	Genus includes new species B. serbiacus.	
Canalispina	Gen. et sp. nov	Valid	Robles-Salcedo et al.	Late Cretaceous (Maastrichtian)		Italy	A member of the family Siderolitidae. Genus includes new species C. iapygia.	
Chusenella tsochenensis	Sp. nov	Valid	Zhang et al.	Middle Permian	Xiala Formation	China	A member of the family Schwagerinidae.	
Cuniculinella omiensis	Sp. nov	Valid	Kobayashi in Kobayashi & Furutani	Permian (late Cisuralian)		Japan	A member of Fusulinida.	
Cyclopsinella roselli	Sp. nov	Valid	Villalonga et al.	Late Cretaceous (Campanian)	Terradets Limestone	Spain		
Globigaetania	Gen. et sp. nov	Valid	Gennari & Rettori	Permian (Wordian to Capitanian)	Gnishik Formation	Iran; Japan	A member of the family Globivalvulinidae. Genus includes new species G. angulata.	
Pachycolumella	Gen. et 2 sp. nov	Valid	Septfontaine, Schlagintweit & Rashidi	Late Cretaceous (Maastrichtian) and Paleocene (Danian)	Tarbur Formation	India; Iran; Oman; Pakistan; Turkey	The type species is P. elongata; genus also includes P. acuta.	
Pseudochablaisia	Gen. et sp. nov	Valid	Schlagintweit, Septfontaine & Rashidi	Late Cretaceous (Maastrichtian)	Tarbur Formation	Iran	A member of the family Pfenderinidae. Genus includes new species P. subglobosa.	
Serrakielina	Gen. et sp. nov	Valid	Schlagintweit & Rashidi	Paleocene		Iran	Genus includes new species S. chahtorshiana.	
Simobaculites saundersi	Sp. nov	Valid	Wilson & Kaminski in Wilson et al.	Cenozoic	Nariva Formation	Trinidad and Tobago		
Socotraella? yazdiana	Sp. nov	Valid	Schlagintweit & Rashidi	Paleocene		Iran		
Tambareauella	Gen. et comb. et sp. nov	Valid	Boukhary & El Naby	Eocene		Egypt; France	A member of the family Nummulitidae. The type species is "Operculina (Nummulitoides)" azilensis Tambareau (1966); genus also includes new species T. russeiesensis.	

== Other organisms ==
=== New taxa ===
Name	Novelty	Status	Authors	Age	Type locality	Country	Notes	Images
Aguirrea	Gen. et sp. nov	Valid	Teichert, Woelkerling & Munnecke	Silurian (Wenlock)	Högklint Formation	Sweden	A coralline alga. Genus includes new species A. fluegelii.	
Amsassia yushanensis	Sp. nov	Valid	Lee et al.	Late Ordovician	Xiazhen Formation	China	A coral-like organism.	
Anechosoma	Gen. et sp. nov	Valid	Krings & Kerp	Early Devonian		United Kingdom	A unicellular organism with possible affinities to the Glaucophyta or Chlorophyta. Genus includes new species A. oblongum.	
Appendisphaera clustera	Sp. nov	Valid	Liu & Moczydłowska	Ediacaran	Doushantuo Formation	China	A microfossil.	
Appendisphaera lemniscata	Sp. nov	Valid	Liu & Moczydłowska	Ediacaran	Doushantuo Formation	China	A microfossil.	
Asterocapsoides fluctuensis	Sp. nov	Valid	Liu & Moczydłowska	Ediacaran	Doushantuo Formation	China	A microfossil.	
Bacatisphaera sparga	Sp. nov	Valid	Liu & Moczydłowska	Ediacaran	Doushantuo Formation	China	A microfossil.	
Baculiphyca brevistipitata	Sp. nov	Valid	Ye et al.	Ediacaran		China	A macroalga.	
Briareus robustus	Sp. nov	Valid	Liu & Moczydłowska	Ediacaran	Doushantuo Formation	China	A microfossil.	
Briareus vasformis	Sp. nov	Valid	Liu & Moczydłowska	Ediacaran	Doushantuo Formation	China	A microfossil.	
Cambrowania	Gen. et sp. nov	Disputed	Tang & Xiao in Tang et al.	Early Cambrian	Hetang Formation	China	An organism of uncertain phylogenetic placement. Originally classified as an animal of uncertain phylogenetic placement, possibly a sponge or a bivalved arthropod; Slater & Budd (2019) contested its animal affinity, and considered its fossil material to be more likely collapsed hollow organic spheroidal acritarchs belonging to the genus Leiosphaeridia. Genus includes new species C. ovata.	
Casterlorum	Gen. et sp. nov	Valid	Retallack	Ordovician (Darriwilian)	Lenoir Formation	United States (Tennessee)	An organism of uncertain affinities, originally described as a hornwort. Genus includes new species C. crispum.	
Cavaspina conica	Sp. nov	Valid	Liu & Moczydłowska	Ediacaran	Doushantuo Formation	China	A microfossil.	
Chiastozygus fahudensis	Sp. nov	Valid	Al Rawahi & Dunkley Jones	Late Cretaceous (late Coniacian to late Campanian)	Fiqa Formation	Oman	A heterococcolith.	
Circumpodium	Gen. et sp. nov	Valid	Wisshak & Hüne	Middle Jurassic (Callovian)	Marnes de Dives Formation	France	A microfossil of uncertain phylogenetic placement. Genus includes new species C. enigmaticum.	
Cyathinema	Gen. et sp. nov	Valid	Agić et al.	Early Ediacaran	Nyborg Formation	Norway	A eukaryote of uncertain phylogenetic placement. The type species is C. digermulense.	
Cymatiosphaeroides forabilatus	Sp. nov	Valid	Liu & Moczydłowska	Ediacaran	Doushantuo Formation	China	A microfossil.	
Daedalosphaera	Gen. et sp. nov	Valid	Loron et al.	Mesoproterozoic – Neoproterozoic transition	Grassy Bay Formation	Canada	A spheroidal acritarch with inner wall sculpture. Genus includes new species D. digitisigna.	
Dicrospinasphaera improcera	Sp. nov	Valid	Liu & Moczydłowska	Ediacaran	Doushantuo Formation	China	A microfossil.	
Distosphaera? corniculata	Sp. nov	Valid	Liu & Moczydłowska	Ediacaran	Doushantuo Formation	China	A microfossil.	
Dollyphyton	Gen. et sp. nov	Valid	Retallack	Ordovician (Darriwilian)	Lenoir Formation	United States (Tennessee)	An organism of uncertain affinities, originally described as a moss belonging to the group Sphagnales. Genus includes new species D. boucotii.	
Doushantuophyton? laticladus	Sp. nov	Valid	Ye et al.	Ediacaran		China	A macroalga.	
Edwardsiphyton	Gen. et sp. nov	Valid	Retallack	Ordovician (Darriwilian)	Lenoir Formation	United States (Tennessee)	An organism of uncertain affinities, originally described as a moss belonging to the group Pottiales. Genus includes new species E. ovatum.	
Enteromorphites magnus	Sp. nov	Valid	Ye et al.	Ediacaran		China	A macroalga.	
Eotylotopalla quadrata	Sp. nov	Valid	Liu & Moczydłowska	Ediacaran	Doushantuo Formation	China	A microfossil.	
Ericiasphaera fibrilla	Sp. nov	Valid	Liu & Moczydłowska	Ediacaran	Doushantuo Formation	China	A microfossil.	
Estrella	Gen. et 2 sp. nov	Valid	Liu & Moczydłowska	Ediacaran	Doushantuo Formation	China	A microfossil. Genus includes new species E. greyae and E. recta.	
Germinosphaera alveolata	Sp. nov	Valid	Miao et al.	Late Paleoproterozoic	Chuanlinggou Formation	China	An organic-walled microfossil interpreted as a unicellular eukaryote.	
Hercochitina violana	Sp. nov	Valid	Nõlvak & Liang in Liang et al.	Ordovician (Katian)	Viola Springs Formation	United States	A chitinozoan.	
Herisphaera	Gen. et 2 sp. nov	Valid	Loron et al.	Mesoproterozoic – Neoproterozoic transition	Grassy Bay Formation; Nelson Head Formation	Canada	A spiny acritarch with regularly distributed processes. Genus includes new species H. arbovela and H. triangula.	
Janegraya	Gen. et sp. nov	Valid	Retallack	Ordovician (Darriwilian)	Lenoir Formation	United States (Tennessee)	An organism of uncertain affinities, originally described as a liverwort belonging to the group Sphaerocarpales. Genus includes new species J. sibylla.	
Knollisphaeridium coniformum	Sp. nov	Valid	Liu & Moczydłowska	Ediacaran	Doushantuo Formation	China	A microfossil.	
Knollisphaeridium heliacum	Sp. nov	Valid	Liu & Moczydłowska	Ediacaran	Doushantuo Formation	China	A microfossil.	
Konglingiphyton? laterale	Sp. nov	Valid	Ye et al.	Ediacaran		China	A macroalga.	
Laminasphaera	Gen. et sp. nov	Valid	Liu & Moczydłowska	Ediacaran	Doushantuo Formation	China	A microfossil. Genus includes new species L. capillata.	
Laufeldochitina toilaensis	Sp. nov	Valid	Nõlvak, Liang & Hints	Ordovician (Dapingian)		Estonia	A chitinozoan.	
Maxiphyton	Gen. et sp. nov	Valid	Ye et al.	Ediacaran		China	A macroalga. Genus includes new species M. stipitatum.	
Membranosphaera	Gen. et sp. nov	Junior homonym	Liu & Moczydłowska	Ediacaran	Doushantuo Formation	China	A microfossil. Genus includes new species M. formosa. The generic name is preoccupied by Membranosphaera Samoilovitch in Samoilovitch and Mtchedlishvili (1961); Shang & Liu (2024) coined a replacement name Membranospinosphaera.	
Mengeosphaera flammelata	Sp. nov	Valid	Liu & Moczydłowska	Ediacaran	Doushantuo Formation	China	A microfossil.	
Mengeosphaera lunula	Sp. nov	Valid	Liu & Moczydłowska	Ediacaran	Doushantuo Formation	China	A microfossil.	
Mengeosphaera membranifera	Sp. nov	Valid	Shang, Liu & Moczydłowska	Ediacaran	Doushantuo Formation	China	An acritarch.	
Moorodinium crispa	Sp. nov	Valid	Wainman et al.	Late Jurassic (late Kimmeridgian–early Tithonian)	Surat Basin	Australia	A dinoflagellate.	
Nimbosphaera	Gen. et sp. nov	Valid	Harper & Krings	Early Devonian	Windyfield chert	United Kingdom	A microfossil resembling the sheathed zoosporangia of extant chytrids. Genus includes new species N. rothwellii.	
Nunatsiaquus	Gen. et sp. nov	Valid	Loron et al.	Mesoproterozoic – Neoproterozoic transition	Grassy Bay Formation	Canada	A spheroidal acritarch with inner wall sculpture. Genus includes new species N. cryptotorus.	
Obelix	Gen. et comb. nov	Valid	Morais et al.	Neoproterozoic	Callison Lake Formation; Chuar Group (Kwagunt Formation)	Canada United States	A vase-shaped microfossil representing tests of protists. The type species is "Cycliocyrillium" rootsi Cohen, Irvine & Strauss (2017); Morais et al. (2019) corrected the suffix for the specific epithet to rootsii.	
Palaeoleptochlamys	Gen. et sp. nov	Valid	Strullu-Derrien et al.	Early Devonian	Rhynie chert	United Kingdom	A member of Amoebozoa belonging to the group Arcellinida. Genus includes new species P. hassii.	
Palaeolyngbya kerpii	Sp. nov	Valid	Krings	Early Devonian	Rhynie chert	United Kingdom	A cyanobacterium with affinities to Oscillatoriaceae.	
Paleoplastes	Gen. et sp. nov	In press	Poinar & Vega	Late Cretaceous (Cenomanian)	Burmese amber	Myanmar	A possible dictyostelid. Genus includes new species P. burmanica. Announced in 2019; the final version of the article naming it was published in 2021.	
Perexiflasca ventricosa	Sp. nov	Valid	Krings & Harper	Early Devonian	Windyfield chert	United Kingdom	A small, chytrid-like organism.	
Rhyniotaxillus	Gen. et sp. nov	Valid	Krings & Sergeev	Early Devonian	Rhynie chert	United Kingdom	A minute coccoid cyanobacterium. Genus includes new species R. devonicus.	
Rhyniovexator	Gen. et sp. nov	Valid	Krings & Kerp	Early Devonian		United Kingdom	Possibly a chytrid or a member of Aphelida. Genus includes new species R. penetrans.	
Sinocylindra linearis	Sp. nov	Valid	Ye et al.	Ediacaran		China	An organism of uncertain phylogenetic placement, possibly an alga or an exceptionally large prokaryote.	
Skuadinium fusum	Sp. nov	Valid	Wainman et al.	Late Jurassic (late Kimmeridgian–early Tithonian)	Surat Basin	Australia	A dinoflagellate.	
Sporosphaera	Gen. et sp. nov	Valid	Landon et al.	Ediacaran		China	A eukaryote reminiscent of acritarchs. Genus includes new species S. guizhouensis.	
Staurolithites ormae	Sp. nov	Valid	Al Rawahi & Dunkley Jones	Late Cretaceous (late Santonian to late Campanian)	Fiqa Formation	Oman	A heterococcolith.	
Tanarium capitatum	Sp. nov	Valid	Liu & Moczydłowska	Ediacaran	Doushantuo Formation	China	A microfossil.	
Tanarium uniformum	Sp. nov	Valid	Liu & Moczydłowska	Ediacaran	Doushantuo Formation	China	A microfossil.	
Tetraphycus laminiformis	Sp. nov	Valid	Miao et al.	Late Paleoproterozoic	Chuanlinggou Formation	China	An organic-walled microfossil, a colonial organism of uncertain phylogenetic placement, possibly a cyanobacteria.	
Variomargosphaeridium varietatum	Sp. nov	Valid	Liu & Moczydłowska	Ediacaran	Doushantuo Formation	China	A microfossil.	
Verrucosphaera	Gen. et sp. nov	Junior homonym	Liu & Moczydłowska	Ediacaran	Doushantuo Formation	China	A microfossil. Genus includes new species V. minima. The generic name is preoccupied by Verrucosphaera Górka (1970); Shang & Liu (2024) coined a replacement name Spinomargosphaera.	

=== Research ===
- Putative traces of life older than 3.95 Ga, reported from northern Labrador (Canada) by Tashiro et al. (2017) are reevaluated by Whitehouse et al. (2019).
- Description of cellularly preserved microfossils from ~3.4 Ga-old deposits of the Kromberg Formation (South Africa), providing information on reproduction patterns of these organisms, is published by Kaźmierczak & Kremer (2019).
- El Albani et al. (2019) describe 2.1 billion-year-old fossils belonging to the Francevillian biota of Gabon, including pyritized string-shaped structures interpreted as produced by a multicellular or syncytial organism able to migrate laterally and vertically to reach food resources.
- A study on ca. 1.9 Ga hairpin-shaped trace fossils and discoid fossils from the Stirling Range Formation (Western Australia) is published by Retallack & Mao (2019), who interpret these fossils as evidence of early life on land.
- A study on organic-walled microfossils from the Cailleach Head Formation (Torridon Group, Scotland) is published by Wacey et al. (2019), who report exceptional preservation of sub-cellular detail in selected cells.
- Phosphatized three-dimensional fossil of a putative calcimicrobe Epiphyton are reported from the Neoproterozoic Dengying Formation (China) by Min et al. (2019).
- A study on the affinities of tubular microfossils from the Ediacaran Doushantuo Formation (China), i.e. Crassitubus, Quadratitubus, Ramitubus and Sinocyclocyclicus, is published by Sun et al. (2019), who reject the interpretation of these taxa as early animals.
- Lehn, Horodyski & Paim (2019) report the first known occurrence of Ediacaran organic-walled microfossils preserved in fine-grained siliciclastic strata of the Camaquã Basin (southernmost Brazil).
- A study on the structure, developmental biology and affinities of Caveasphaera costata from the Ediacaran Doushantuo Formation (China) is published by Yin et al. (2019).
- A study on possible cells and their appendages in fossils of Epiphyton from the Wuliuan of the North China Platform, and on their implications for the classification of this taxon, is published by Zhang et al. (2019).
- A study on the morphology and colony organization of Rhyniococcus uniformis (a Devonian organism resembling extant cyanobacteria in the genus Merismopedia), based on data from new specimens, is published by Krings & Harper (2019).
- A new method of assessing the morphology of fossil radiolarian specimens is presented by Kachovich, Sheng & Aitchison (2019), who apply their method to six specimens from the Cambrian Inca Formation (Australia) and Ordovician Piccadilly Formation (Canada) and evaluate the implications of their method for the studies of radiolarian evolution.

== History of life in general ==
Research related to paleontology that concerns multiple groups of the organisms listed above.

- Experiments indicating that abiotic chemical gardening can mimic structures interpreted as the oldest known fossil microorganisms in both morphology and composition are conducted by McMahon (2019).
- A study on biomarkers recovered from cap dolomites of the Araras Group (Brazil), interpreted as evidence of the transition from a bacterial to eukaryotic dominated ecosystem after the Marinoan deglaciation, likely caused by massive bacterivorous grazing by ciliates, is published by van Maldegem et al. (2019).
- Biomarkers thought to be diagnostic for demosponges and cited as evidence of rise of animals to ecological importance prior to the Cambrian radiation are reported to be also synthesized by rhizarians by Nettersheim et al. (2019), who place the oldest unambiguous evidence for animals closer to the Cambrian Explosion.
- A study on crucial conditions affecting the evolution of a proto-metabolism in early life is published by Goldford et al. (2019).
- A study on the age of the Ediacaran fossils from the Podolya Basin (southwestern Ukraine) is published by Soldatenko et al. (2019).
- A study on occurrences of body and trace fossils in Ediacaran and lower Cambrian (Fortunian) rocks around the world is published by Muscente et al. (2019), who report evidence indicative of existence of a global, cosmopolitan assemblage unique to terminal Ediacaran strata, living between two episodes of biotic turnover which might be the earliest mass extinctions of complex life.
- A study on the diversification of animals and their behaviour in the Ediacaran–Cambrian interval, as indicated by fossil and environmental proxy records, is published by Wood et al. (2019), who interpret the fossil record as indicating that the rise of early animals was more likely a series of successive, transitional radiation events which extended from the Ediacaran to the early Paleozoic, rather than competitive or biotic replacement of the latest Ediacaran biotas by markedly distinct Cambrian ones.
- A study comparing the variability of Ediacaran faunal assemblages to that of more recent fossil and modern benthic assemblages is published by Finnegan, Gehling & Droser (2019).
- A study on the intensity of animal bioturbation and ecosystem engineering in trace fossil assemblages throughout the latest Ediacaran Nama Group (Namibia), evaluating the implications of this data for the knowledge of the causes of the disappearance of the Ediacaran biota, is published by Cribb et al. (2019).
- A study on mechanisms of skeletal biomineralization in early animals (focusing on Cloudina and Cambrian hyoliths and halkieriids) is published by Gilbert et al. (2019).
- A study on the relationship between atmospheric oxygen oscillations, the extent of shallow-ocean oxygenation and the animal biodiversity in the Cambrian period is published by He et al. (2019).
- A study on the course of the transition from microbial-dominated reef environments to animal-based reefs in the early Cambrian, as indicated by data from strata in the western Basin and Range of California and Nevada, is published by Cordie, Dornbos & Marenco (2019).
- An assemblage of early Cambrian small carbonaceous fossils and acritarchs, including possible oldest known annelid remains, is described from the siltstones of the Lappajärvi impact structure (Finland) by Slater & Willman (2019).
- A study aiming to explain the occurrence of the variety of trace fossils associated with Tuzoia carapaces from the Cambrian Burgess Shale (British Columbia, Canada) is published by Mángano, Hawkes & Caron (2019).
- Cambrian Lagerstätte from the Qingjiang biota (Shuijingtou Formation; Hubei, China), preserving fossils of diverse, ~518 million years old biota, is reported by Fu et al. (2019).
- A study aiming to infer whether a marked drop in known diversity of marine life during the period between the Cambrian explosion and the Great Ordovician Biodiversification Event (the Furongian Gap) is apparent, due to sampling failure or lack of rock, or real, is published by Harper et al. (2019).
- A study on the marine biodiversity changes throughout the first 120 million years of the Phanerozoic is published by Rasmussen et al. (2019).
- A study aiming to determine factors influencing early Palaeozoic marine biodiversity is published by Penny & Kröger (2019).
- A study on rates of origination and extinction at the genus level throughout early Paleozoic is published by Kröger, Franeck & Rasmussen (2019), who also present estimates of longevity, taxon age and taxon life expectancy of early Paleozoic marine genera.
- A review of biodiversity curves of marine organisms throughout early Paleozoic, indicating the occurrence of a large-scale, long-term radiation of life that started during late Precambrian time and was only finally interrupted in the Devonian Period, is published online by Harper, Cascales-Miñana & Servais (2019).
- A study on processes causing fluctuations of biodiversity of marine invertebrates throughout the Phanerozoic is published by Rominger, Fuentes & Marquet (2019).
- A study on the impact of environmental changes on the biodiversity of North American marine organisms throughout the Phanerozoic is published by Roberts & Mannion (2019).
- A study testing the hypothesis that the influence of ocean chemistry and climate on the ecological success of marine calcifiers decreased throughout the Phanerozoic is published by Eichenseer et al. (2019).
- A study on genus origination and extinction rates in the Ordovician on a global scale, for the paleocontinents Baltica and Laurentia, and for onshore and offshore areas, is published by Franeck & Liow (2019).
- First Middle Ordovician (Dapingian–Darriwilian) soft-bodied fossils from northern Gondwana (fossils of medusozoan possibly belonging to the genus Patanacta, possible members of the family Wiwaxiidae and an arthropod possibly belonging to the family Pseudoarctolepidae) are described from the Valongo Formation (Portugal) by Kimmig et al. (2019).
- New Konservat-Lagerstätte containing exceptionally preserved soft-bodied organisms, including the earliest record of Acoelomorpha, Turbellaria, Nemertea and Nematoda reported so far, is described from the Ordovician (Katian) Vauréal Formation (Canada) by Knaust & Desrochers (2019).
- A review of occurrence data of latest Ordovician benthic marine organisms is published by Wang, Zhan & Percival (2019), who evaluate the implications of the studied data for the knowledge of the course of the end-Ordovician mass extinction.
- A revision of Silurian fauna from the Pentland Hills (Scotland) described by Archibald Lamont in 1978 is published by Candela & Crighton (2019).
- A study on the course of graptolite extinctions during the middle Homerian biotic crisis and on the impact of this crisis on other marine invertebrates, as indicated by data from the Kosov Quarry section of the Prague Synform (Czech Republic), is published by Manda et al. (2019).
- Well-preserved fossil cryptic biota is reported from the submarine cavities of the Devonian (Emsian to Givetian) mud mounds in the Hamar Laghdad area (Morocco) by Berkowski et al. (2019).
- A study aiming to test and quantify the classification of Devonian biogeographic areas, based on distributional data of Devonian trilobite, brachiopod and fish taxa, is published by Dowding & Ebach (2019).
- A study on patterns of local richness of terrestrial tetrapods throughout the Phanerozoic is published by Close et al. (2019).
- Description of tetrapod and fish fossils from the coastal locality of Burnmouth, Scotland (Ballagan Formation), associated plant material and sedimentological context of these fossils is published by Clack et al. (2019), who interpret these fossils as evidence of the potential richness of the Tournaisian fauna, running counter to the assumption of a depauperate nonmarine fauna following the end-Devonian Hangenberg event.
- A study on the impact of climate changes during the Carboniferous–Permian transition on the evolution of land-living vertebrates is published by Pardo et al. (2019).
- A study aiming to test one of the scenarios proposed by Robert L. Carroll in 1970 to explain the origin of the amniotic egg, based on data from Permo-Carboniferous tetrapods, is published by Didier, Chabrol & Laurin (2019).
- An overview of the studies researching biodiversity changes in the Permian and their links to volcanism is published by Chen & Xu (2019).
- Haridy et al. (2019) report the occurrence of overgrowth of palatal dentition of Cacops and Captorhinus by a new layer of bone to which the newest teeth are then attached (the overgrowth pattern also documented in early fishes), and evaluate the implications of this finding for the knowledge of the origin of teeth.
- A study on the severity of the end-Guadalupian extinction event is published online by Rampino & Shen (2019).
- A study on the ecology of Permian tetrapods from the Abrahamskraal Formation (South Africa), as indicated by stable oxygen isotope compositions of phosphate from teeth and bones used as a proxy for water dependence, is published online by Rey et al. (2019).
- Two Permian tetrapod assemblages, recovered from the northernmost point at which the lowest Beaufort Group has been targeted for collecting fossils, are reported from the southern Free State (South Africa) by Groenewald, Day & Rubidge (2019), who evaluate the implications of these fossils for the knowledge of faunal provincialism within the Middle to Late Permian Karoo Basin.
- A study aiming to determine which Permian tetrapod assemblage zones are present in the vicinity of Victoria West (Northern Cape, South Africa), and to reassess the biostratigraphic provenance of specimens collected historically in this area (including the holotype of Lycaenops ornatus), is published by Day & Rubidge (2019).
- A study on the course of the turnover from the Daptocephalus to Lystrosaurus Assemblage Zones of the Karoo Basin is published by Gastaldo et al. (2019).
- A study on the timing of the extinction of latest Permian vertebrates in the Karoo Basin of South Africa is published online by Rampino et al. (2019).
- A study on the identification and position of the terrestrial end-Permian mass extinction in southern African sediments, based on data from a new site in the South African Karoo Basin, is published online by Botha et al. (2019).
- A study on the functional diversity of middle Permian and Early Triassic marine paleocommunities in the area of present-day western United States, and on its implications for the knowledge of functional re-organization of these communities in the aftermath of the Permian–Triassic extinction event, is published by Dineen, Roopnarine & Fraiser (2019).
- A study aiming to explain high biodiversity preserved in the Triassic Cassian Formation (Italy) is published online by Roden et al. (2019).
- A study on shark, sizable carnivorous archosaur, big herbivorous tetrapod and probable turtle bromalites (coprolites and possibly some cololites) from a turtle-dominated fossil assemblage from the Upper Triassic Poręba site (Poland) is published by Bajdek et al. (2019), who evaluate the implications of their findings for inferring the diet of the Triassic turtle Proterochersis porebensis.
- A study on seawater oxygenation during the Early Jurassic and its impact on the recovery of marine benthos after the Triassic–Jurassic extinction event, as indicated by data from Blue Lias Formation (United Kingdom), is published by Atkinson & Wignall (2019).
- A study on the patterns and processes of recovery of marine fauna after the Toarcian oceanic anoxic event, as indicated by data from the Cleveland Basin (Yorkshire, United Kingdom), is published by Caswell & Dawn (2019).
- A study on changes of land vegetation resulting from the Toarcian oceanic anoxic event is published by Slater et al. (2019).
- Skeletal elements of Oxfordian ichthyosaurs and plesiosaurs are reported from the Kingofjeld mountain (north-east Greenland) by Delsett & Alsen (2019).
- New marine reptile-bearing localities documenting the Tithonian–Berriasian transition at the High Andes (Mendoza Province, Argentina) are reported by Fernández et al. (2019).
- A study on microvertebrate fossils from the Upper Jurassic or Lower Cretaceous of Ksar Metlili (Anoual Syncline, Morocco), evaluating their palaeobiogeographical implications, and on the age of this fauna, is published online by Lasseron et al. (2019).
- Description of mid-Cretaceous invertebrate fauna from Batavia Knoll (eastern Indian Ocean), and a study on its similarities to other Cretaceous faunas from around the Indian Ocean, is published by Wild & Stilwell (2019).
- A study on the age of the vertebrate fauna from the Cretaceous Cerro Barcino Formation (Argentina) is published online by Krause et al. (2019).
- Possible amphibian, gastropod and insect egg masses are described from the Cretaceous amber from Myanmar by Xing et al. (2019).
- A study on coprolites from the Upper Cretaceous deposits in the Münster Basin (northwestern Germany), evaluating their implications for the knowledge of Cretaceous trophic structures and predator–prey interactions, is published by Qvarnström et al. (2019).
- New vertebrate assemblage from the upper Turonian Schönleiten Formation of Gams bei Hieflau (Austria) is described by Ősi et al. (2019).
- Turonian marine vertebrate fossils from the Huehuetla quarry (Puebla, Mexico) are described by Alvarado-Ortega et al. (2019).
- A study on the biogeography of Cretaceous terrestrial tetrapods is published by Kubo (2019).
- A study on the structure and contents of a large piece of amber attached to a jaw of a specimen of Prosaurolophus maximus from the Cretaceous Dinosaur Park Formation (Alberta, Canada), evaluating the implications of this finding for the knowledge of the habitat and taphonomy of the dinosaur, is published by McKellar et al. (2019).
- An accumulation of fossil eggshells of bird, crocodylomorph and gekkotan eggs is reported from the Late Cretaceous Oarda de Jos locality in the vicinity of the city of Sebeș (Romania) by Fernández et al. (2019).
- A review of the fossil record of Late Cretaceous and Paleogene vertebrates from the Seymour Island (Antarctica) is published by Reguero (2019).
- A study on the evolutionary history of the family Pospiviroidae, aiming to assess possible impact of the Cretaceous–Paleogene extinction event on the divergence rates in this family, is published by Bajdek (2019).
- A study on calcareous nanoplankton and planktic foraminiferal assemblages in a Cretaceous-Paleogene section from the peak ring of the Chicxulub crater, and on their implications for the knowledge of recovery of plankton after the Cretaceous–Paleogene extinction event, is published by Jones, Lowery & Bralower (2019).
- A study on the course of recovery of the nanoplankton communities after the Cretaceous–Paleogene extinction event is published by Alvarez et al. (2019), who report evidence indicative of 1.8 million years of exceptional volatility of post-extinction communities and indicating that the emergence of a more stable equilibrium-state community coincided with indicators of carbon cycle restoration and a fully functioning biological pump.
- A study on the timing and nature of recovery of benthic marine ecosystems of Antarctica after the Cretaceous–Paleogene mass extinction, as indicated by data from fossils of benthic molluscs, is published by Whittle et al. (2019).
- A study on the drivers and tempo of biotic recovery after Cretaceous–Paleogene mass extinction, as indicated by data from the Corral Bluffs section of the Denver Basin (Colorado, United States), is published by Lyson et al. (2019).
- Description of the vertebrate assemblage from the Oligocene Shine Us locality in the Khaliun Basin (Mongolia) is published by Daxner-Höck et al. (2019).
- Description of reptile and amphibian fossils from the early Miocene localities of the Kilçak section (Turkey) is published by Syromyatnikova et al. (2019).
- Description of fossil fish, amphibian and reptilian fauna from the middle Miocene locality Gračanica (Bosnia and Herzegovina) is published online by Vasilyan (2019).
- A study on the vertebrate fossils from the early Clarendonian localities within the Goliad Formation in Bee and Live Oak Counties in Texas (comprising the Lapara Creek Fauna), and on the stratigraphic context of these localities, is published by May (2019).
- New late Miocene vertebrate assemblage, including turtle, rodent and xenarthran fossils (among which is the oldest record of an armadillo belonging to the genus Dasypus reported so far), is described from the Los Alisos locality (Guanaco Formation, Argentina) by Ercoli et al. (2019).
- Description of a diverse late Miocene marine fauna from the Bloomfield Quarry (Wilson Grove Formation; California, United States), including the most diverse assemblage of fossil walruses yet reported worldwide from a single locality, is published by Powell et al. (2019).
- Fish, turtle and mammals fossils are described from a locality near Whitehorse (Yukon, Canada), probably of Miocene age, by Eberle et al. (2019).
- A study on microscopic traces of hominin and animal activities in the Denisova Cave (Russia), providing the information on the use of this cave over the last 300,000 years, is published by Morley et al. (2019).
- A study on the age of the Pleistocene vertebrate assemblage from the Khok Sung locality (Thailand) is published by Duval et al. (2019).
- Revision of reptile and amphibian fossils from the late Pleistocene collection of the "Caverne Marie-Jeanne" (Hastière-Lavaux, Namur Province, Belgium) is published by Blain et al. (2019).
- New late Pleistocene site Tsaramody (Sambaina basin, Madagascar), preserving diverse subfossil remains of vertebrates, is reported by Samonds et al. (2019).
- A study on the paleoecology and diet of late Pleistocene terrestrial vertebrates known from an asphalt deposit (Project 23, Deposit 1) at Rancho La Brea (California, United States) is published online by Fuller et al. (2019).
- A study on changes of vegetation in southern Borneo over the past 40,000 calibrated years BP, as indicated by data from Saleh Cave (South Kalimantan, Indonesia), is published by Wurster et al. (2019).
- Late Quaternary fossils of vertebrates are described from caves in the Manning Karst Region of eastern New South Wales (Australia) by Price et al. (2019).
- A study aiming to determine the relationships between extinctions of megafauna, climatic changes and patterns of human appearance in south-eastern Australia over the last 120,000 years is published by Saltré et al. (2019).
- A study on the causes of Holocene extinction of megafauna of Madagascar is published by Godfrey et al. (2019).
- A review discussing possible links between the fossil record of marine biodiversity, nutrient availability and primary productivity is published online by Martin & Servais (2019).
- A study on factors which determined the relative intensity of marine extinctions during greenhouse–icehouse transitions in the Late Ordovician and the Cenozoic is published online by Saupe et al. (2019).
- A study on the possible relationship between speciation and extinction rates of different groups of organisms and the ages of these groups, as indicated by data from extant and fossil species, is published by Henao Diaz et al. (2019).
- A study on the evolution of bite force of amniotes, as indicated by data from extant and fossil taxa, is published by Sakamoto, Ruta & Venditti (2019).
- A study on the phylogenetic distribution, morphological variation and functions of apicobasal ridges (elevated ridges of tooth enamel) in aquatic reptiles and mammals, as indicated by data from extant and fossil taxa, is published by McCurry et al. (2019).
- A study on the impact of uncertainty of stratigraphic age of fossils on studies estimating species divergence times which incorporate fossil taxa, based on data from the fossil record of North American mammals and from the dataset of extant and fossil cetaceans, is published by Barido-Sottani et al. (2019).
- A study evaluating the impact of information about stratigraphic ranges of fossil taxa on the analyses of timing of evolutionary divergence is published online by Püschel et al. (2019).
- A study on anatomical distribution, abundance, geometry, melanin chemistry and elemental inventory of melanosomes in tissues of extant vertebrates, evaluating their implications for reconstructions of internal soft-tissue anatomy in fossil vertebrates, is published by Rossi et al. (2019).
- A study on the chronostratigraphy and biostratigraphy of Cenozoic vertebrate (mostly mammal) fossils from the South Carolina Coastal Plain is published by Albright et al. (2019).

== Other research ==
Other research related to paleontology, including research related to geology, palaeogeography, paleoceanography and paleoclimatology.

- A study on the biological oxygen production during the Mesoarchean, as indicated by data from Mesoarchean shales of the Mozaan Group (Pongola Supergroup, South Africa) preserving record of a shallow ocean "oxygen oasis", is published by Ossa Ossa et al. (2019).
- A study on the extent of the oxygenation of ocean waters over continental shelves before the Great Oxidation Event, as indicated by data from 2.5-billion-year-old Mount McRae Shale (Australia), is published by Ostrander et al. (2019).
- A study on the extent of the oxygenation of shallow oceans 2.45 billion years ago is published by Rasmussen et al. (2019), who interpret their findings as indicating that oxygen levels both the surface oceans and atmosphere were exceedingly low before the Great Oxidation Event, which the authors interpret as directly caused by evolution of oxygenic photosynthesis.
- A study aiming to determine whether the overall size of the biosphere decreased at the end of the Great Oxidation Event, based on data on isotope geochemistry of sulfate minerals from the Belcher Group (subarctic Canada), is published by Hodgskiss et al. (2019).
- Evidence of a burst of mantle activity at the end of the Archean (around 2.5 billion years ago) is presented by Marty et al. (2019), who interpret their findings as lending credence to models advocating a magmatic origin for environmental changes such as the Great Oxidation Event.
- A study aiming to determine the effects of competition of early anoxygenic phototrophs and primitive oxygenic phototrophs on the Earth system, especially on the large-scale oxygenation of Earth's atmosphere ~2.3 billion years ago, is published by Ozaki et al. (2019).
- A study on the geochemistry of mat-related structures and their host sediments from the Francevillian Formation (Gabon) is published by Aubineau et al. (2019), who evaluate the implications of their findings for the knowledge whether ancient microbes induced illitisation (conversion of smectite to illite–smectite mixed-layer minerals), and for the knowledge of Earth's climate and ocean chemistry in the Paleoproterozoic.
- A study on the organic geochemical (biomarker) signatures of the 1.38-billion-years-old black siltstones of the Velkerri Formation (Australia), and on their implications for inferring the microbial diversity and palaeoenvironment of the Proterozoic Roper Seaway, is published by Jarrett et al. (2019).
- A study on the origins of putative stromatolites and associated carbonate minerals from lacustrine sedimentary rocks of the 1.1-billion-years-old Stoer Group is published by Brasier et al. (2019).
- A study suggesting a link between early evolution and diversification of animals and high availability of copper in the late Neoproterozoic is published by Parnell & Boyce (2019).
- A study aiming to determine the cause of the uniquely high amplitudes of Neoproterozoic δ^{13}C excursions is published by Shields et al. (2019).
- A study evaluating the possible relationship between the Cryogenian magmatic activity and the evolution of early life, based on data from the Cryogenian Yaolinghe Group (China), is published by Long, Zhang & Luo (2019).
- Evidence for oxygenated waters near ice sheet grounding lines during the Cryogenian is presented by Lechte et al. (2019).
- A study on ocean oxygen levels during the Ediacaran Shuram negative C-isotope Excursion and the middle Ediacaran, and on their implications for the evolution of the Ediacaran biota, is published by Zhang et al. (2019).
- A study on the causes of widespread preservation of soft-bodied organisms in sandstones of the Ediacara Member in South Australia is published by Liu et al. (2019).
- A study on the seafloor oxygen fugacity in the time of the emergence of the earliest known benthic animals, as inferred from data from the latest Ediacaran Dengying Formation (China), is published by Ding et al. (2019).
- A study on the process of fossilization of Ediacaran organisms, and on its impact on the preservation of the external shape of these organisms, is published by Bobrovskiy et al. (2019).
- A study on the global extent of the oxygenation of seafloor, surface oceans and atmosphere during early Cambrian is published by Dahl et al. (2019), who report evidence of two major oceanic anoxic events in the early Cambrian.
- A study on nitrogen isotope and organic carbon isotope data from the lower Cambrian Niutitang Formation (China) is published online by Xu et al. (2019), who link nitrogen cycle perturbations to animal diversification during the early Cambrian.
- A study on the paleoecological characteristics of Cambrian marine ecosystems of central Sonora (Mexico) is published by Romero et al. (2019).
- A study on seawater temperatures during the Cambrian, as indicated by data from oxygen isotope analyses of Cambrian brachiopod shells, is published by Wotte et al. (2019).
- A study on bottom-water redox conditions in the late Cambrian Alum Shale Sea, as indicated by sedimentary molybdenum contents of the Alum Shale, is published by Dahl et al. (2019), who interpret their findings as indicating that anoxic sulfidic bottom waters were an intermittent rather than persistent feature of Cambrian oceans, and that early animals invaded the seafloor during oxygenated periods.
- A study on the paleogeographic position of all major Phanerozoic arc-continent collisions, comparing it with the latitudinal distribution of ice-sheets throughout the Phanerozoic, is published by Macdonald et al. (2019).
- A study aiming to determine whether the Ordovician meteor event directly affected Earth's climate and biota is published by Schmitz et al. (2019).
- A review of the evidence of evolutionary radiation of animals throughout the Great Ordovician Biodiversification Event, and of environmental changes coincident with these biotic changes, is published by Stigall et al. (2019).
- A study on conodont oxygen isotope compositions in Ordovician samples from Argentine Precordillera and Laurentia, and on their implications for the knowledge of palaeothermometry and drift of the Precordillera in the early Paleozoic, is published online by Albanesi et al. (2019).
- A study on carbon isotope data from stratigraphic sections at Germany Valley (West Virginia) and Union Furnace (Pennsylvania) in the Central Appalachian Basin, evaluating its implications for the knowledge of change in atmospheric oxygen levels during the late Ordovician and its possible relationship with early diversification of land plants, is published by Adiatma et al. (2019).
- Signatures of Devonian (Famennian) forests and soils preserved in black shales in the southernmost Appalachian Basin (Chattanooga Shale; Alabama, United States) are presented by Lu et al. (2019).
- A study examining the intensity of explosive volcanism from 400 to 200 million years ago, and evaluating its impact on the late Paleozoic Ice Age, is published by Soreghan, Soreghan & Heavens (2019).
- Description of Cisuralian charcoal from the Barro Branco coal seam (Siderópolis Member of the Rio Bonito Formation, Brazil), and a study on its implications for reconstruction of palaeo-wildfire occurrences in peat-forming vegetation through the Late Palaeozoic in Gondwana, is published by Benicio et al. (2019).
- A study on the extent and causes of the end-Capitanian extinction event, based on data from the Middle to Late Permian section of the Sverdrup Basin (Ellesmere Island, Canada), is published online by Bond, Wignall & Grasby (2019).
- A study on the ocean chemistry during the Permian–Triassic extinction event, as indicated by data from a new stratigraphic section in Utah, and on its implications for the knowledge of the causes of this extinction, is published by Burger, Estrada & Gustin (2019).
- A study aiming to determine the stratigraphic position of the end-Permian biotic crisis in the Sydney Basin (Australia) is published by Fielding et al. (2019), who also attempt to determine the climate changes in this region concurrent with the end-Permian extinction.
- A study on shifts in volcanic activity across the Permian-Triassic boundary, as indicated by measurements of mercury in marine sections across the Northern Hemisphere, is published by Shen et al. (2019).
- A study on mercury enrichments in Permian-Triassic boundary sections from Lubei (South China craton) and Dalongkou (Junggar terrane), and on their implications for the knowledge of volcanic activity during the Permian-Triassic transition, is published by Shen et al. (2019).
- Evidence of the environmental transition from meandering to braided rivers and of the development of desert-like conditions in the earliest Triassic is reported from Permian-Triassic boundary sections in Shanxi (China) by Zhu et al. (2019).
- A study on the nitrogen isotope variations in oceanic waters in the aftermath of the end-Permian mass extinction is published by Sun et al. (2019), whose conceptual model indicates ammonium intoxication of the oceans during this time period.
- A study on microbially induced sedimentary structures from the Lower Triassic Blind Fiord Formation (Arctic Canada), evaluating their implications for the knowledge of the course of biotic recovery in the aftermath of the Permian–Triassic extinction event, is published online by Wignall et al. (2019).
- A study on the oxygen isotope compositions of discrete conodont elements from the Lower Triassic Mianwali Formation (Pakistan), and on their implications for inferring the timing of temperature changes and the interrelationship between climate and biodiversity patterns during the Smithian-Spathian biotic crisis, is published by Goudemand et al. (2019).
- A study on nutrient availability through the Early to Middle Triassic along the northern margin of Pangea is published online by Grasby et al. (2019).
- A study on the character and extent of the Triassic Boreal Ocean delta plain across the area of the present-day Barents Sea, interpreted as the largest delta plain reported so far, is published by Klausen, Nyberg & Helland-Hansen (2019).
- A study aiming to determine links between volcanic activity in the Central Atlantic magmatic province, elevated concentrations of mercury in marine and terrestrial sediments and abnormalities of fossil fern spores across the Triassic-Jurassic boundary in southern Scandinavia and northern Germany is published by Lindström et al. (2019).
- A study aiming to reconstruct the palaeoenvironmental changes of the late Pliensbachian outside of Western Tethys Ocean and to test their temporal relation to large igneous province volcanism is published by De Lena et al. (2019).
- Krencker, Lindström & Bodin (2019) present sedimentological, paleontological and geochemical evidence from the Central High Atlas Basin (Morocco) and Jameson Land (Greenland) indicative of the occurrence of a major sea-level drop prior to the onset of the Toarcian oceanic anoxic event.
- A study on the duration of the Toarcian oceanic anoxic event, as indicated by data from the Talghemt section in the High Atlas (Morocco), is published by Boulila et al. (2019).
- A study on the Middle Jurassic palaeoenvironment of La Voulte (France), as indicated by data from exceptionally preserved eyes of the polychelidan lobster Voulteryon parvulus and from epibiontic brachiopods associated with V. parvulus, is published by Audo et al. (2019).
- A study comparing the Jurassic floras of the Ayuquila Basin and the Otlaltepec Basin (Mexico) and evaluating their implications for the knowledge of the Jurassic environments of these basins is published by Velasco-de León et al. (2019).
- A study on Jurassic paleomagnetism, based on an updated set of Jurassic paleopoles from Adria (Italy), is published by Muttoni & Kent (2019).
- A study on the chronostratigraphy of the Upper Jurassic Morrison Formation is published by Maidment & Muxworthy (2019).
- Evidence of repeated significant oceanic and biotic turnovers in the area of the present-day Gulf of Mexico at the Jurassic-Cretaceous transition is presented by Zell et al. (2019).
- A study on the age of the dinosaur-bearing Upper Jurassic–Lower Cretaceous sediments of western Maestrazgo Basin and South-Iberian Basin (eastern Spain), aiming to also reconstruct the palaeoenvironments of this area on the basis of data from these sediments, is published by Campos-Soto et al. (2019).
- A review of data on the Jurassic and Cretaceous climates of Siberia is published by Rogov et al. (2019).
- A study on global climatic changes during the Early Cretaceous, focusing on the duration and magnitude of Early Cretaceous cold episodes, is published by Vickers et al. (2019).
- Evidence from the Lower Cretaceous strata around the southern margin of the Eromanga Basin (Australia) indicative of cold (limited glacial and/or seasonal freezing) conditions persisting in Southern Australia through the Hauterivian and the Aptian is presented by Alley, Hore & Frakes (2019).
- A study on phototropism in extant trees from Beijing and Jilin Provinces and fossil tree trunks from the Jurassic Tiaojishan and Tuchengzi formations in Liaoning and Beijing regions (China), and on its implications for inferring the history of the rotation of the North China Block, is published by Jiang et al. (2019).
- A study on the age of the Cretaceous Cloverly Formation is published by D'Emic et al. (2019).
- Evidence from the chronostratigraphy, fossil content, bracketing facies and ages of the Cretaceous Wayan Formation of Idaho and Vaughn Member of the Blackleaf Formation of Montana, indicating that they represent the same depositional system prior to disruption by subsequent tectonic and volcanic events, is presented by Krumenacker (2019).
- A study on Cenomanian plants from the Redmond no.1 mine near Schefferville (Redmond Formation; Labrador Peninsula, Canada) and on their implications for the knowledge of paleoclimate of this site is published by Demers-Potvin & Larsson (2019).
- The first high-resolution record of Cenomanian–Turonian paleotemperatures from the Southern Hemisphere, as indicated by data from the Ocean Drilling Program Site 1138 on the Kerguelen Plateau, is presented by Robinson et al. (2019).
- A study on the impact of marine biogeochemical processes on the Cretaceous Thermal Maximum is published by Wallmann et al. (2019).
- A study on the age of the Upper Cretaceous Wadi Milk Formation (Sudan) is published by Owusu Agyemang et al. (2019).
- A study on Cenomanian to Coniacian polar environmental conditions at eight locations in northeast Russia and northern Alaska is published online by Spicer et al. (2019).
- A study on variability of carbon, oxygen and nitrogen isotopes in multiple tissues from a wide array of extant vertebrate taxa from the Atchafalaya River Basin in Louisiana (inferred to be an environmental analogue to the Late Cretaceous coastal floodplains of North America), and on its implications for formulating and testing predictions about ancient ecological communities based on stable isotope data from fossil specimens, is published by Cullen et al. (2019).
- A study on the general distribution and stratigraphy of the lower shale member of the Campanian Aguja Formation (Texas, United States), and a revision of all significant larger vertebrate fossil specimens from these strata, is published by Lehman et al. (2019).
- High-precision dating for the Battle Formation (Alberta, Canada) is presented by Eberth & Kamo (2019).
- High-precision dating and the first calibrated chronostratigraphy for the Horseshoe Canyon Formation (Alberta, Canada) is presented by Eberth & Kamo (2019).
- A study on the Maastrichtian climate of Arctic Alaska, based on data from the Prince Creek Formation, is published by Salazar-Jaramillo et al. (2019).
- Studies on the timing of the Deccan Traps volcanism close to the Cretaceous-Paleogene boundary are published by Schoene et al. (2019), who interpret their findings as indicative of four high-volume eruptive periods close to the Cretaceous-Paleogene boundary, the first of which occurred tens of thousands of years prior to both the Chicxulub bolide impact and Cretaceous–Paleogene extinction event and by Sprain et al. (2019), who interpret their findings as indicating that a steady eruption of the flood basalts mostly occurred in the earliest Paleogene.
- A study on the environmental variability before and across the Cretaceous-Paleogene mass extinction, as inferred from data on the calcium isotope ratios of aragonitic mollusc shells from the López de Bertodano Formation (Antarctica), is published online by Linzmeier et al. (2019).
- A turbulently deposited sediment package directly overlain by the Cretaceous–Paleogene boundary tonstein is reported from the Tanis site (Hell Creek Formation, North Dakota, United States) by DePalma et al. (2019), who interpret their findings as indicating that deposition occurred shortly after a major bolide impact, and might have been caused by the Chicxulub impact.
- A study on the immediate aftermath of the Chicxulub impact at the Cretaceous–Paleogene boundary, based on data from the Chicxulub crater, is published by Gulick et al. (2019).
- Evidence of rapid ocean acidification in the aftermath of the Chicxulub impact and of the protracted Earth system recovery after the Cretaceous–Paleogene extinction event is presented by Henehan et al. (2019).
- The longest, highest resolution, stratigraphically continuous, single-species benthic foraminiferal carbon and oxygen isotope records for the Late Maastrichtian to Early Eocene from a single site in the South Atlantic Ocean, providing information on the evolution of climate and carbon-cycling during this time period, are presented by Barnet et al. (2019).
- O'Leary et al. (2019) publish a monograph on the sedimentology and sequence stratigraphy of the part of Mali which was covered by an ancient epeiric sea known as the Trans-Saharan Seaway during the Late Cretaceous and early Paleogene, provide the first formal description of and nomenclature for the Upper Cretaceous and lower Paleogene geological formations of this region, and revise fossil flora and fauna of this region.
- Zeebe & Lourens (2019) provide a new absolute astrochronology up to 58 Ma and a new Paleocene–Eocene boundary age.
- A study on stomata of fossil specimens of members of the family Lauraceae from the Eocene of Australia and New Zealand, evaluating their implications for reconstructions of Eocene pCO_{2} levels, is published by Steinthorsdottir et al. (2019).
- Climate simulations capturing major climatic features of the Early Eocene and the Paleocene–Eocene Thermal Maximum in a state-of-the-art Earth system model are presented by Zhu, Poulsen & Tierney (2019).
- A study evaluating the utility of membrane lipids of members of Thaumarchaeota (now Nitrososphaerota) as proxies for the carbon isotope excursion and surface ocean warming, and assessing their implications for the knowledge of the source and size of carbon emissions during the Paleocene–Eocene Thermal Maximum, is published by Elling et al. (2019).
- A study on abundant black charcoal shards from Paleogene sites of Wilson Lake B (New Jersey) and Randall's Farm (Maryland) is published by Fung et al. (2019), who interpret these shards as most likely to be evidence of widespread wildfires at the Paleocene-Eocene boundary caused by extraterrestrial impact.
- A study on the impact of carbon-based greenhouse gas fluxes associated with the North Atlantic Igneous Province on the onset of the Paleocene–Eocene Thermal Maximum is published by Jones et al. (2019).
- Evidence from the Deep Ivorian Basin offshore West Africa (equatorial Atlantic Ocean), indicating that peak warming during the Middle Eocene Climatic Optimum was associated with upper-ocean stratification, decreased export production, and possibly harmful algal blooms, is presented by Cramwinckel et al. (2019).
- New stable isotopes record of the Middle Eocene Climatic Optimum event is reported from eastern Turkey by Giorgioni et al. (2019).
- A study on variations of ocean circulation and marine bioproductivity related to the beginnings of the formation of the Antarctic Circumpolar Current, based on data from Eocene and Oligocene sedimentary drift deposits east of New Zealand, is published by Sarkar et al. (2019).
- A study on changes in surface water temperature in the eastern North Sea Basin during the late Priabonian to earliest Rupelian is published by Śliwińska et al. (2019).
- A study linking the onset or strengthening of an Atlantic meridional overturning circulation to the closure of the Arctic–Atlantic gateway at the Eocene–Oligocene transition is published by Hutchinson et al. (2019).
- A study on the timing of the uplift of the Tibetan Plateau, as indicated by the discovery of the Oligocene palm fossils in the Lunpola Basin in Tibet, is published by Su et al. (2019).
- A review of vertebrate fossils from the Tibetan Plateau, evaluating their implications for inferring the course of the uplift of the Tibetan Plateau, is published by Deng et al. (2019).
- A study on the impact of changing Eocene paleogeography and climate on the utility of stable isotope paleoaltimetry methods in the studies aiming to reconstruct the elevation history of the Tibetan Plateau is published by Botsyun et al. (2019).
- A study on the causes of the long-term climate cooling during the Neogene is published by Rugenstein, Ibarra & von Blanckenburg (2019).
- A study on the climatic and environmental conditions in the Loperot site (Kenya) in the early Miocene is published by Liutkus-Pierce et al. (2019).
- A study on the timing and course of the separation of the Indian Ocean and the Mediterranean Sea in the Miocene is published by Bialik et al. (2019).
- A study comparing changes of the export of intermediate-depth Pacific waters to the western North Atlantic prior to the closure of the Central American Seaway with records of strength of the Atlantic meridional overturning circulation, evaluating the implications of this data for the knowledge of the timing of closure of the Central American Seaway, is published by Kirillova et al. (2019).
- A study on climatic and environmental changes in central Andes during the late Miocene is published by Carrapa, Clementz & Feng (2019).
- A study on the exact age of the marine fauna from the Miocene Chilcatay and Pisco formations (Peru), and on its implications for reconstructions of local paleoenvironment, is published online by Bosio et al. (2019).
- A study on the origin of the African C_{4} savannah grasslands is published by Polissar et al. (2019).
- A study on the anatomical traits of teeth and inferred diet of bovids, suids and rhinocerotids from Kanapoi, and on their implications for reconstructing the environments of this site, is published online by Dumouchel & Bobe (2019).
- New spatial data on the Plio-Pleistocene Bolt's Farm pits from the Cradle of Humankind site (South Africa) is presented by Edwards et al. (2019), who also attempt to provide key biochronological ages for the Bolt's Farm deposits.
- A study on the global mean sea level during the Pliocene mid-Piacenzian Warm Period is published by Dumitru et al. (2019).
- A study on the amplitude of sea-level variations during the Pliocene is published by Grant et al. (2019).
- Simulations of coevolution of climate, ice sheets and carbon cycle over the past 3 million years are presented by Willeit et al. (2019).
- A study on the age of the Sahara, as indicated by data from Pliocene and Pleistocene paleosols from the Canary Islands, is published by Muhs et al. (2019).
- A study on the latest Villafranchian climate and environment of the area of southern Italy, as indicated by amphibian and reptile fossil record from the Pirro Nord karstic complex, is published by Blain et al. (2019).
- A study on atmospheric gas levels before and after the shift from glacial cycles of 100 thousand years to 40-thousand-year cycles around one million years ago, as inferred from data from ice core samples from the Allan Hills Blue Ice Area (East Antarctica), is published by Yan et al. (2019).
- A study on pCO_{2} levels from 2.6 to 0.8 Ma is published by Da et al. (2019), who find no evidence indicating that the Mid-Pleistocene Transition was caused by the decline of pCO_{2}.
- A study on changes in winter rainfall in the Mediterranean over the past 1.36 million years is published by Wagner et al. (2019).
- Results of stable carbon and oxygen isotope analyses of tooth enamel samples from Pleistocene mammals from the Yugong Cave and Baxian Cave (China) are presented by Sun et al. (2019), who evaluate the implications of their findings for the knowledge of Pleistocene climatic and environmental changes in South China.
- A study on Pleistocene mammal fossils from the Yai Ruak Cave (Krabi Province, Thailand), including the southernmost known record of Crocuta crocuta ultima, is published by Suraprasit et al. (2019), who evaluate the implications of these fossils for reconstructions of the environment in the area of the Malay Peninsula in the Pleistocene.
- A study on Acheulean and Middle Stone Age sites from the Eastern Desert (Sudan), preserving stone artifacts, is published by Masojć et al. (2019), who interpret these sites as evidence of green corridor or corridors across Sahara which made early hominin dispersal possible.
- Evidence from oxygen isotope data from Soreq Cave speleothems (Israel), indicative of the occurrence of summer monsoon rainfall in the Middle East during recurrent intervals of the last interglacial period (overlapping with archeological indicators of human migration), is presented by Orland et al. (2019).
- A study on the spatial and temporal distribution of ancient peatlands in the past 130,000 years is published by Treat et al. (2019).
- A study on the size of fossil rabbits from 14 late Pleistocene and Holocene archaeological sites in Portugal, and on its implications for the knowledge of temperatures and environment in the area of Portugal during the last glaciation, is published by Davis (2019).
- A study on Pleistocene small mammal remains from Stratigraphic Unit V from El Salt site (Alcoy, Spain), evaluating their implications for the knowledge of climatic conditions in the eastern Iberian Peninsula at the time of the disappearance of local Neanderthal populations during Marine Isotope Stage 3, is published by Fagoaga et al. (2019).
- A study on the sedimentary sequence from the Pilauco site in Chile, evaluating whether evidence from this site is consistent with the Younger Dryas impact hypothesis, is published by Pino et al. (2019).
- A study on variations of size of fossil murine rodents from Liang Bua (Flores, Indonesia) through time, and on their implications for reconstructions of paleoclimate and paleoenvironment of Flores, is published by Veatch et al. (2019).
- A study on human land use worldwide from 10,000 years before the present to 1850 CE, indicating that Earth was to a large extent transformed by human activity by 3000 years ago, is published by Stephens et al. (2019).
- Evidence for synchronous cyclical changes in monsoon climate, human activity and prehistoric cultural development in the area of northeast China throughout the Holocene is presented by Xu et al. (2019).
- A study on Andean plate tectonics since the late Mesozoic is published by Chen, Wu & Suppe (2019).
- A study on the course of the collision of India and Asia, as indicated by palaeomagnetic data from the Burma Terrane, is published by Westerweel et al. (2019).
- A scenario for the genesis of tropical cyclones throughout the Cenozoic is presented by Yan et al. (2019).
- A study on the extent of ice sheets in the Northern Hemisphere throughout the Quaternary is published by Batchelor et al. (2019).
- A new method of concentration of proteins from fossil specimens with high humic content and of removal of humic substances is presented by Schroeter et al. (2019).
