= Jena Formation =

Geological formation in Germany

- Stratigraphic range: Triassic
- Type: Formation

Location
- Country: Germany

The Jena Formation is a geologic formation in Germany. It preserves fossils dating back to the Triassic period.

== Fauna ==
==== Vertebrata ====
- Mentosaurus waltheri
- Capitosauroidea indet.
- Nothosaurus sp.
- Tholodus schmidi
- Tanystropheus sp.
- Nicoraella germanica

==== Cephalopoda ====
- Balatonites balatonicus
- Beneckeia buchi

==== Bivalva and Gastropoda ====
- Entolium discites
- Ompheloptycha gregaria
- Bivalvia indet.

==== Crinoidea ====
- Holocrinus dubius
- Holocrinus wagneri
- Carnallicrinus sp.

==== Crustacea ====
- Lissocardia sp.

==== Microfossils ====
- Ammodiscus sp.
- Glomospirella grandis
- Veryhachium sp.
- Micrhystridium sp.

==== Ichnotaxa ====
- Chirotherium sp.
- Balanoglossites triadicus
- Trypanites weisei
- Trypanites fosteryeomani

== See also ==
- List of fossiliferous stratigraphic units in Germany
