= Laurie Godfrey =

American paleontologist and anthropologist

- Born: Laurie Rohde Godfrey; August 27, 1945 (age 81)
- Education: Harvard University
- Known for: Research on the lemurs of Madagascar
- Awards: Guggenheim Fellowship (2008) Charles R. Darwin Lifetime Achievement Award (2024)
- Scientific career
- Fields: Anthropology; Paleontology
- Workplaces: University of Massachusetts Amherst
- Thesis: Structure and Function in Archaeolemur and Hadropithecus (subfossil Malagasy Lemurs): The Postcranial Evidence (1977)

Laurie R. Godfrey (born August 27, 1945) is an American paleontologist and physical anthropologist. She is emeritus professor of anthropology at the University of Massachusetts Amherst. Her research has focused on the evolutionary history of the present-day lemur populations of Madagascar. An outspoken critic of creationism and advocate for the teaching of evolution in schools, she has edited three books on the subject: Scientists Confront Creationism (1983), What Darwin Began: Modern Darwinian and Non-Darwinian Perspectives on Evolution (1985), and (with A.J. Petto) Scientists Confront Intelligent Design and Creationism (2007). She was most recently awarded the Charles R. Darwin Lifetime Achievement Award by the American Association of Biological Anthropologists in 2024 for her work advancing the understanding of extinct Madagascar lemurs through dental microwear, ancient DNA, and other methods.
