= Mao Formation =

Geologic formation in the Dominican Republic

- Stratigraphic range: Pliocene
- Type: Formation

Lithology
- Primary: Limestone
- Other: Siltstone

Location
- Coordinates: 19.5°N 71.2°W
- Approximate paleocoordinates: 19.5°N 70.8°W
- Country: Dominican Republic
- Mao Formation (the Dominican Republic)

The Mao Formation is a geologic formation in the northwestern Dominican Republic. The reefal limestone and siltstone formation preserves bivalve, gastropod, echinoid and coral fossils dating back to the Pliocene period.

== Fossil content ==
- Antillia coatesi
- Diaphus aequalis
- Isophyllia jacksoni, I. maoensis
- Trachyphyllia mcneilli

== See also ==
- List of fossiliferous stratigraphic units in the Dominican Republic
