= Loperot =

- Location within Kenya
- Coordinates: 2.33°N 35.85°E
- Country: Kenya
- Province: Rift Valley Province
- Time zone: UTC+3 (EAT)

Loperot is a primate fossil site, located within Kenya's Rift Valley Province, approximately 50 km west of Lake Turkana.
