= Brassington Formation =

Geological formation in Great Britain

- Stratigraphic range: Mid-Late Miocene Serravallian-Tortonian
- Type: Geological formation
- Unit of: Great Britain Superficial Deposits Supergroup
- Sub-units: Kirkham Member, Bees Nest Member, Kenslow Member
- Underlies: Alluvium
- Overlies: Carboniferous Limestone (Peak Limestone Group)
- Area: Staffordshire, Derbyshire
- Thickness: up to 70 metres (230 ft)

Lithology
- Primary: Sand
- Other: Clay, Silt, Gravel

Location
- Region: Europe
- Country: United Kingdom
- Extent: 220 km^{2}

Type section
- Named for: Brassington
- Named by: Boulter et al.
- Location: Bees' Nest Pit
- Year defined: 1971
- Thickness at type section: 43 metres (140 ft)

The Brassington Formation is a geological formation in the United Kingdom, and the country's most significant onshore Miocene deposit. it is preserved as around 60 inliers in karsts of Carboniferous limestone, specifically the Peak Limestone Group, in a triangular region on the borders of the Staffordshire and Derbyshire counties. As traditionally defined, the lithology largely consists of unconsolidated sand with clay and minor silt components, though the only unambiguously Miocene parts are clay dominated. It is divided up into several members, though the Miocene nature of several of these members has been contested. The unambiguously Miocene aged Kenslow Member is dated to the Serravallian to Tortonian stages based on palynology.

== Lithology ==
The main source rocks for the Brassington Formation as traditionally defined are the Triassic sandstones of the Sherwood Sandstone Group. Three members are traditionally recognised, the Kenslow Member, the Kirkham Member and Bees Nest Member. A 2026 study argued that the Kirkham and Bees Nest members are actually autochthonous Triassic sediments, representative of the Sherwood Sandstone Group and Mercia Mudstone Group respectively, and that the Kenslow Member and the newly defined Friden Member were the only genuinely Miocene parts of the succession.

=== Kirkham Member ===
The Lithology of the Kirkham member consists of up to 40–50 m of cream or white coloured (originally red coloured) kaolinitic fluvial derived unfossiliferous sand, gravel and pebble beds, possibly with local cementation.

=== Bees Nest Member ===
The lithology of the Bees Nest Member consists of interbedded mottled sandy and silty clays of varying colours (green, grey, red and yellow brown), it is 6 m thick in the Bees Nest pit and up to 21 m in the Kenslow Pit. It represents a low energy aquatic or lacustrine depositional setting

=== Kenslow Member ===
The Lithology of the Kenslow Member consists of up to 6 m of massive lacustrine grey coloured clay, with the uppermost parts containing abundant wood fragments preserved as mummifications. It was deposited in a shallow lacustrine to swampy setting. Some outcrops of the Kenslow Member have lignite lenses.

=== Friden Member ===
Only exposed at the top of Kenslow Top Pit in the vicinity of Friden, dominated by clay.

== Paleoenvironmental interpretation ==
The vegetation from the Kenslow member suggests a subtropical, seasonally wet climate, with a temperature range of 23.6-28.3°C for the warmest month, and 1.8-12.5°C for the coldest month. The palynomorph assemblage is dominated by pollen of the genera Picea, Pinus, Tsuga and Sciadopitys, the last of which today is confined to a single species in Japan. It was probably deposited close to sea level, but a significant distance from the sea. Fossil wood and pollen referable to the genus Cryptomeria has also been found. Fossil fungi have also been reported from the Kenslow Member.
