= Beneckeia =

Beneckeia Temporal range: Early - Middle Triassic

Scientific classification
- Kingdom: Animalia
- Phylum: Mollusca
- Class: Cephalopoda
- Subclass: Ammonoidea
- Order: Ceratitida
- Family: Beneckeiidae
- Genus: Beneckeia Mojsisovics, 1882

Genus of molluscs (fossil)

Beneckeia is a genus of Lower to Middle Triassic ammonites included in the ceratitid family Beneckeiidae found e.g. in Germany, Poland, and Israel. Beneckeia shells are compressed smooth oxycones, involute with sharp venters. Sutures are multilobed with small adventitious lobes.
