= Old Bank Formation =

Geological formation in Panama

- Stratigraphic range: Messinian
- Type: Formation
- Sub-units: Fish Hole Member

Lithology
- Primary: Limestone

Location
- Coordinates: 9.3°N 82.1°W
- Approximate paleocoordinates: 9.1°N 81.2°W
- Region: Bocas del Toro
- Country: Panama
- Old Bank Formation (Panama)

The Old Bank Formation is a geologic formation in Bocas del Toro Province, Panama. It preserves coral fossils dating back to the Messinian period.

== Fossil content ==
- Antillia coatesi
- Trachyphyllia mcneilli

== See also ==
- List of fossiliferous stratigraphic units in Panama
