= Mentosaurus =

Scientific classification
- Domain: Eukaryota
- Kingdom: Animalia
- Phylum: Chordata
- Clade: Sarcopterygii
- Clade: Tetrapodomorpha
- Genus: †Mentosaurus; Röpke, 1930

Type species
- †Mentosaurus waltheri Röpke, 1930

Extinct genus of temnospondyls

Mentosaurus is an extinct genus of temnospondyls. It lived around 247-242 million years ago.

M. waltheri was identified in Germany in 1930 by Walter Karl Johann Roepke.
