= Nicoraella =

Nicoraella Temporal range: Triassic

Scientific classification
- Kingdom: Animalia
- Phylum: Chordata
- Infraphylum: Agnatha
- Class: †Conodonta
- Order: †Ozarkodinida
- Family: †Gondolellidae
- Genus: †Nicoraella; Kozur, 1980

Type species
- Ozarkodina kockeli Tatge, 1956

Species
- Nicoraella germanica Kozur, 1972

Extinct genus of conodont

Nicoraella is an extinct genus of gondolellid conodont that lived during the Triassic period.

== Taxonomy ==
Nicoraella contains the type species Nicoraella kockeli as well as the species Nicoraella germanica.

== Description ==
The singular alate element in the S_{0} position of Nicoraella was flanked abaxially by breviform digyrate S_{1} and S_{2} elements, then by S_{3} and S_{4} elements that were bipennate, and then by inwardly curved M elements.
