= Gyaltsenglossus =

Gyaltsenglossus Temporal range: Wuliuan

Scientific classification
- Kingdom: Animalia
- Phylum: Hemichordata
- Genus: †Gyaltsenglossus; Nanglu, Caron, & Cameron, 2020
- Species: †G. senis

Binomial name
- †Gyaltsenglossus senis Nanglu, Caron, & Cameron, 2020

Genus of hemichordate animal

Gyaltsenglossus (GEN-zay-gloss-us; from Gyaltsen, the discoverer's father's name, and the Greek glossa, meaning "tongue", a common generic suffix for hemichordates; the species name senis derives from the Greek senex meaning “old”) is a monospecific hemichordate known from the Burgess Shale of Canada that is notable for advancing the understanding of the early evolution of the phylum Hemichordata. Its discovery has been hailed as a "breakthrough" due to featuring both Pterobranch-like feeding tentacles and an Enteropneust-like proboscis-tipped elongate body, thus uniting the two morphologically disparate orders of the Hemichordata. A phylogenetic analysis recovered Gyaltsenglossus senis as the first known stem group hemichordate.

Gyaltsenglossus was able to both attach to a substrate for upright suspension feeding and crawl along the seafloor for deposit feeding, suggesting that bimodal feeding may have been an early feature of the hemichordates. Its bulbous posterior structure is similar to Cambrian enteropneusts, making it likely that this structure, as well as paired feeding arms derived from the dorsal collar, were likely present in the hemichordate last common ancestor. In addition to characteristics from both major hemichordate clades, Gyaltsenglossus had a row of short, thin appendages projecting from a small elevated platform behind the collar. These have no clear homologs within Hemichordata.

The contrast between the short, broad nature of Gyaltsenglossus's attachment structure and the long, narrow stalks of both pterobranches and the possible stem-echinoderm Yanjiahella has been held to imply a slender, stolon-like structure for earlier stem hemichordates. The nature of early attachment structures has implications for the debate over whether the earliest bilaterian was sedentary. While no tubes were found associated with Gyaltsenglossus, it is possible that they might exist.

In a 2026 study describing the proposed stem-group ambulacrarian Yujingia, the authors included Gyaltsenglossus in the data matrix, finding it to be a stem-group pterobranch (and thus a crown-group hemichordate). Notably, Yujingia shares a similar differentiated feeding apparatus to Gyaltsenglossus, comprising a crown of six pinnate appendages and many "strip-like" appendages.

The following Cladogram is based on He et al. 2026:

- Ambulacraria (total group)
  - - Ambulacraria (crown group)
      - Echinodermata
      - Hemichordata
        - Pterobranchia (total group)
          - Pterobranchia (crown group)
          - †Gyaltsenglossus
        - Enteropneusta (total group)
          - Enteropneusta (crown group)
          - †Spartobranchus
          - †Oesia
    - †Yujingia
  - †Cambroernida
    - - †Eldonioidea
        - †Rotadiscus
        - - †Eldonia eumorpha
          - †Eldonia ludwigi
          - †Pararotadiscus
      - †Phlogites
    - †Herpetogaster
