= Yujingia =

Yujingia Temporal range: Cambrian Stage 3, 518 Ma

Scientific classification
- Kingdom: Animalia
- Clade: Nephrozoa
- Superphylum: Deuterostomia
- Stem group: Ambulacraria
- Genus: †Yujingia; He et al., 2026

Type species
- †Yujingia glutenotunica He et al., 2026

Extinct genus of Cambrian animals

Yujingia is an extinct genus of stem-group ambulacrarian known from the Chengjiang biota of China, dated to 518 million years ago in Cambrian Stage 3, early Cambrian period. It is suggested to be a stem-group ambulacrarian close to the split between hemichordates and echinoderms. It has been described as possessing features more reminiscent of the sessile tentaculate pterobranchs and cambroernids than enteropneusts, contrasting with previous conclusions that the ancestor of hemichordates and ambulacrarians in general was a free-living, non-tentaculate worm-like organism, and that the chordate and enteropneust mode of feeding through pharyngeal slits is a plesiomorphy.

== Etymology ==
The generic name Yujingia refers to the Dharma Vessel held by Guanyin, one of the Four Great Bodhisattvas of Chinese Buddhism, alluding to the fossil's overall shape. The specific epithet glutenotunica derives from the Latin gluten and tunica and refers to the light body wall preserved around the visceral mass of the fossil.

== Description ==
Yujingia was a small, soft-bodied worm-like animal that bore multiple anterior appendages. The body terminates relatively abruptly, with no terminal narrowing or stalk as in other sessile ambulacrarians. Like Herpetogaster, it seemingly had no tripartite segmentation as seen in later hemichordates. It was also described to lack an anterior proboscis or stalk, characteristics which are responsible for it falling in the ambulacrarian stem- rather than crown-group. Conversely, it also possessed features of more derived ambulacrarians, like the stem-enteropneust Gyaltsenglossus, with which it shares a differentiated feeding apparatus comprising a crown of six pinnate appendages and many "strip-like" appendages. The pinnate appendages possessed a medial groove and many alternating lateral branches. While different from the modern graptolite (Rhabdopleura) two-armed habit, this general condition of multiple differentiated arm pairs is seen in cephalodiscid pterobranchs.

== Ecology ==
In keeping with hemichordates and other stem ambulacrarians, the authors suggest a sedentary suspension feeding lifestyle for Yujingia.

== Phylogeny ==
Cladogram modified from the original paper, finding Yujingia to occupy a stem position close to the crown of ambulacraria, more crownward than the classic stem-group cambroernids.

- Deuterostomia
  - Chordata (total group)
    - - - - Chordata (crown group)
          - †Pikaia
        - †Yunnanozoon
      - - †Vetulicolidae
        - †Ooedigera
        - †Didazoonidae
        - †Banffozoa
      - †Nesonektris
    - †Vetulocystida
  - Ambulacraria (total group)
    - - Ambulacraria (crown group)
        - Echinodermata
        - Hemichordata
          - Pterobranchia (total group)
            - Pterobranchia (crown group)
            - †Gyaltsenglossus
          - Enteropneusta (total group)
            - Enteropneusta (crown group)
            - †Spartobranchus
            - †Oesia
      - †Yujingia
    - †Cambroernida
      - - †Eldonioidea
          - †Rotadiscus
          - - †Eldonia eumorpha
            - †Eldonia ludwigi
            - †Pararotadiscus
        - †Phlogites
      - †Herpetogaster
