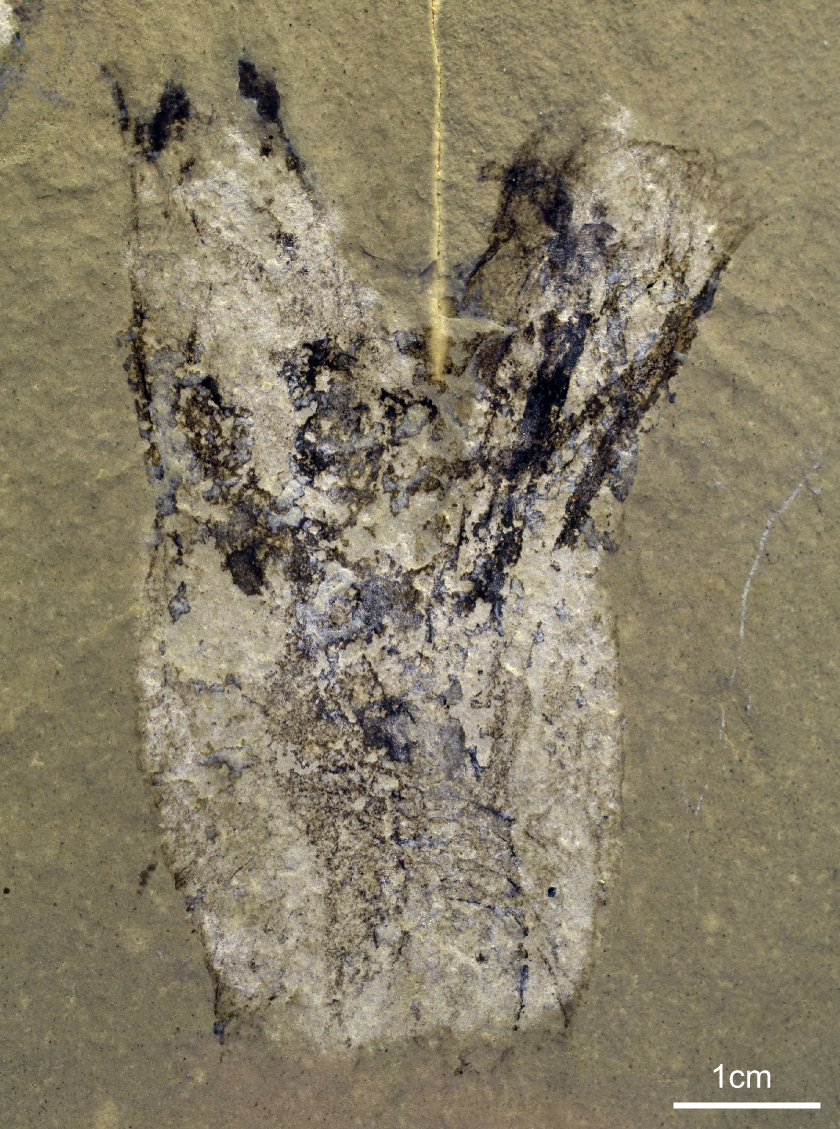
- Type specimen of M. thylakos

Scientific classification
- Kingdom: Animalia
- Phylum: Chordata
- Subphylum: Tunicata
- Genus: †Megasiphon; Nanglu et al., 2023
- Species: †M. thylakos

Binomial name
- †Megasiphon thylakos Nanglu et al., 2023

= Megasiphon =

Megasiphon thylakos Temporal range: Middle Cambrian (Guzhangian), 500 Ma

Extinct genus of tunicate

Megasiphon thylakos is an extinct species of tunicate that lived in the Guzhangian stage of the Middle Cambrian, 500 million years ago.

== Morphology, description and anatomy ==
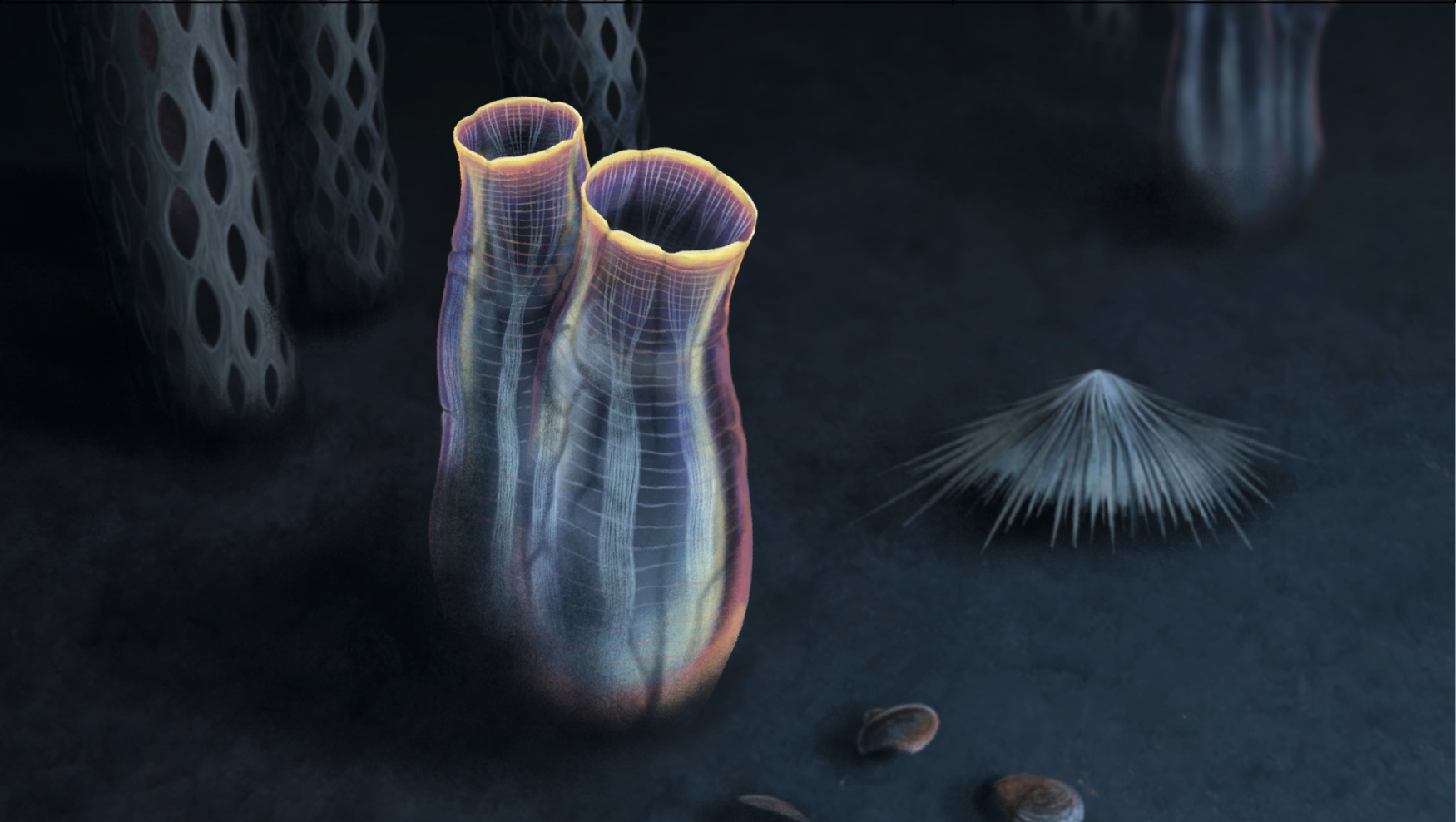
Reconstruction of Megasiphon

The barrel-shaped main body extends apically into two long siphons of similar size, which have millimetric circular transverse muscle bands. The siphons have an axis of inclination of approximately 25° with respect to the longitudinal axis of the organism and are associated with longitudinal muscular bands extending from the upper region.

The siphon with more extensive disaggregated muscle fibers and thicker muscle bands may be the oral siphon, while the other siphon is probably the auricular siphon. However, it is difficult to unequivocally differentiate between the two siphons based on the holotype.

In modern representatives of ascidians, the contraction of the circular and longitudinal musculature causes the ascidian to squirt or shrink. Its presence in Megasiphon indicates that these behavioral traits typical of tunicates had already evolved approximately 500 million years ago.

The holotype is very similar to phlebobrachs in morphology; in contrast, Megasiphon lacks any clear similarity to stalked stolidobranchs or motile thaliaceans, and its morphology is incompatible with tadpole-like appendiculars. The new species differs greatly from Shankouclava.

== Evolutionary implications for Olfactores ==
Since external morphology alone may not be able to resolve the phylogenetic placement of Megasiphon relative to extant tunicates, it is more optimal to propose two alternative phylogenetic placements, which has profound evolutionary implications.

Megasiphon may be a crown tunicate as a sister group to the clade uniting the modern Ascidiacea and Taliacea (Acopa). This location would indicate that the divergence between appendicularians and all other tunicates had already occurred earlier than indicated by the molecular clock estimated at 450 million years ago, pushing the divergence back approximately 50 million years. Other primitive ascidians such as Burykhia and possibly Ausia that date back 550 million years push the origin of the Acopa clade back even further than indicated by the molecular clock. This proposal follows the argument that an olfactorian and tunicate ancestor was motile, and that the sessile nature of ascidians is a derived character arising after appendicularians and vertebrates diverged from the modern ascidian lineage.

Motile animal

Sessile animal, with motile larva.

- Chordata
  - - Cathaymyrus †?
    - Leptocardii/Acrania (lancelets)
  - Olfactores
    - Tunicata
      - Appendicularia
      - Acopa sea squirts
        - Shankouclava †
        - - Megasiphon †
          - Burykhia †
          - - Stolidobranchia
            - - Enterogona
                - Phlebobranchia*
                - Aplousobranchia
              - Thaliacea
    - Vertebrata (fish and allies)

Another possibility is that, as with Shankouclava, Megasiphon may represent a stem-tunicate, a position that would indicate that a sea squirt-like body plan is ancestral to the entire Tunicata group, and the tadpole-like appendicular motile is a derived state. Supported by developmental biology and the report of massive gene loss in appendicularians, this hypothesis would imply that the first non-appendicular tunicates were probably sedentary-pelagic ascidian-like organisms, with a two-phase life cycle that included larval metamorphosis. The uniphasic and pelagic lifestyle would then be synapomorphic for thaliaceans. Using the molecular clock to indicate Megasiphon as a stem-tunicate because the divergence between Appendicularia and Acopa occurs 450 million years ago, implies that the 555-million-year-old Burykhia is possibly a stem-olfactorian, because the divergence among modern tunicates and vertebrates it occurs approximately 547 million years ago. Added to this is a study that indicates that vertebrates (and all Bilateria in general) descend from a sedentary ancestor in the adult stage but a pelagic ancestor in the larval stage, appealing to Hox genes, deep homologies, and metamerism without segmentation. The unusual morphology of Shankouclava makes its relationship with the rest of the tunicates somewhat ambiguous because the oral siphon is not very defined and presents tentacle-like structures reminiscent of ambulacraria and lophophorates, it lacks an atrial siphon, and does not resemble phlebobranchs such as Megasiphon and Burykhia; Therefore it is possible that it is actually a more basal group of Olfactores.

- Chordata
  - - Cathaymyrus †?
    - Leptocardii/Acrania (lancelets)
  - Olfactores sea squirts
    - Shankouclava †
    - - Burykhia †
      - - - Megasiphon †
          - Tunicata
            - Copelata
              Larvacea
            - Acopa true sea squirts
              - Stolidobranchia
              - - Enterogona
                  - Phlebobranchia*
                  - Aplousobranchia
                - Thaliacea
        - sea squirt-like
          Vertebrata

The Megasiphon authors postulate the organism as a stem tunicate, rather than a stem Acopa, as more plausible because the position of Megasiphon as a main group tunicate does not require drastically changing the estimate of the molecular clock nor the origin of Ascidiacea given by the same, would instead only set minimum divergence estimates for the origins of Tunicata at about 500 million years ago; second, an evolutionary scenario involving sedentary-pelagic sessile ancestry appears to be more likely for Olfactores and Tunicata when consider other lines of evidence.
