= Velumbrella =

Velumbrella Temporal range: Early Cambrian–Middle Cambrian

Scientific classification
- Kingdom: Animalia
- Clade: †Cambroernida
- Class: †Eldonioidea
- Family: †Rotadiscidae (?)
- Genus: †Velumbrella; Stasińska 1960

Type species
- V. czarnockii Stasińska 1960

Species of eldonioid

Velumbrella is an eldonioid known from the Early to Middle Cambrian of Poland. The fossils depict a scleritosed disk with a U-shaped gut.

Velumbrella was originally thought to be related to the hydrozoan order Trachylenida, or possibly to Ediacaria or Beltanella which were considered to be Cambrian jellyfish. Upon erecting the class Eldonioidea, Dzik assigned Vellumbrella to Eldoniidae rather than Rotadiscidae on account of its radial ribs.

Several authors (including Dzik) later noted the similarity between Velumbrella cznarnockii and Pararotadiscus guizhouensis (which was initially described as Rotadiscus guizhouensis). A more recent review tenatively placed Velumbrella in the Rotadiscidae (along with the more confidently-assigned Pararotadiscus), noting that the rotadiscids are distinguished from other eldonioid families by concentric ornamentations on the dorsal surface.
