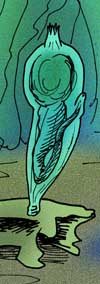
- Restoration of C. ancestralis.

Scientific classification
- Kingdom: Animalia
- Phylum: Chordata
- Subphylum: Tunicata
- Class: Ascidiacea
- Genus: †Cheungkongella; Shu et al., 2001

Type species
- †Cheungkongella ancestralis Shu et al., 2001

Species
- †C. ancestralis Shu et al., 2001

= Cheungkongella =

Cheungkongella Temporal range: Cambrian Stage 3, 518 Ma

Extinct genus with possible tunicate affinities

Cheungkongella is a fossil organism from the lower Cambrian Chengjiang lagerstatte, the affinity of which has been the subject of debate. It was announced as a "probable" tunicate while noting the lack of definitive Cambrian fossils from that group. However, this affinity was later disputed in a paper announcing the discovery of Shankouclava, also from Chengjiang, as the oldest known tunicate. Cheungkongella has been accepted as a distinct taxon and possible tunicate by multiple workers not involved in its discovery, but the dispute remains unresolved.

== Etymology ==
"Cheungkong" is "a metaphor of China" and honors the Cheungkong Scholars Programme's support for the work leading to the fossil's discovery. "Ancestralis" refers to the fossil's possible primitive taxonomic position.

== Description ==
Cheungkongella has a club-shaped body similar to the extant ascidian Styela, with a bucket-shaped main body with thick, tapering stem beneath it. A large oral siphon with short tentacles at the top of the animal leads to a pharynx occupying two-thirds of the main body, with a structure presumed to ben an alimentary canal beneath it. A small cloacal siphon emerges from the side above the transition to the stem.

== Classification ==
Cheungkongella was placed in the class Ascidiacea based on its resemblance Styela. This classification was initially accepted by other workers.

=== Proposal to synonomize with Phlogites ===
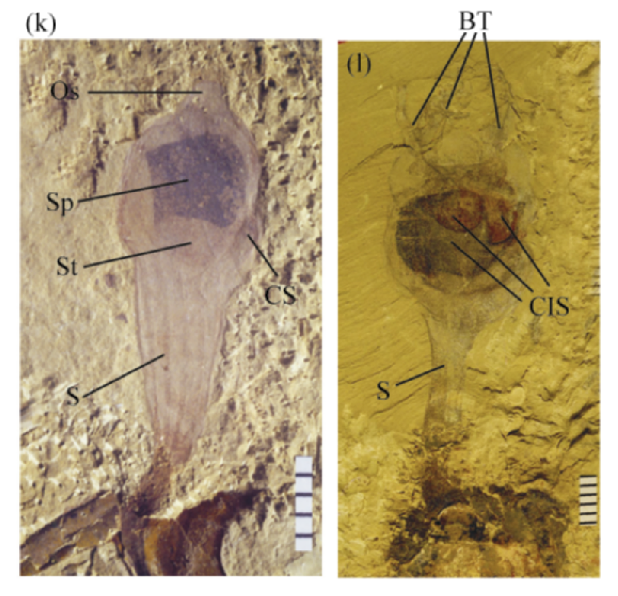
Cheungkongella ancestralis (left) and Phlogites (right) fossils for comparison (BT: branching tentacles; CIS: Complex internal organs; Os: Oral siphon; S: Stem; Sp: Simple pharynx; St: Stomach)

A 2003 paper announcing Shankouclava as the oldest known tunicate both disputed Cheungkongella's affinities and proposed that it is a junior synonym of Phlogites, which was though to be a lophophorate at the time.

The paper stated that Cheungkongella is "indistinguishable" from Phlogites, but proceeded to note several differences, most notably the lack of any "obvious" arms in Cheungkongella despite acknowledging that three or five such arms are a prominent feature of Phlogites. The paper speculated that this is "perhaps because its arms broke off or are covered by rock." The lack of a coiled gut in Cheunkongella was dismissed by noting that not all specimens of Phlogites display one.

The original description of Cheungkongella noted light dots in the area interpreted as a pharynx that could be gill slits, but stated that the interpretation required confirmation. The Shankouclava paper suggested that these dots are taphonomic artifacts due to their irregular pattern. However, the paper's other arguments against tunicate affinities were based on newly discovered specimens of Phlogites, rather than on the Cheungongella specimen itself. Phlogites is now known to be a cambroernid, and has never been assigned to the tunicates except as a result of Cheungkongella being considered a synonym.

A responding paper disputing the synonymization with Phlogites provided the image shown on this page in response to criticisms of poor image quality in past publications.

A paper on the affinities of Phlogites accepted the synonymization, but did not discuss the Cheungkongella fossil except to note a similar thickness of stem between it and a subset of the new Phlogites specimens. The similarity of the lower section has also been noted by workers who consider the two taxa to be separate.

The resemblance between Cheunkongella and Phlogites has been dismissed as "superficial" by a researcher not involved with the discoveries of either of those taxa or of Shankcouklava. Other sources not directly involved in the dispute have recognized both Cheungkongella (as distinct from Phlogites) and Shankouclava as possible (if debatable) tunicates, or recognize Cheungkongella as a tunicate and Shankouclava as chordate.

The dispute remains unresolved, as has been noted by sources that accept or tentatively accept the synonymization.
