= Seputus =

Seputus Temporal range: Ordovician

Scientific classification
- Kingdom: Animalia
- Clade: †Cambroernida (?)
- Class: †Eldonioidea (?)
- Family: †Rotadiscidae (?)
- Genus: †Seputus; MacGabhann & Murray, 2010

Type species
- S. pomeroii MacGabhann & Murray, 2010

Fossil taxon

Seputus is a discoid fossil from the Ordovician period that may represent an eldonioid cambroernid.
