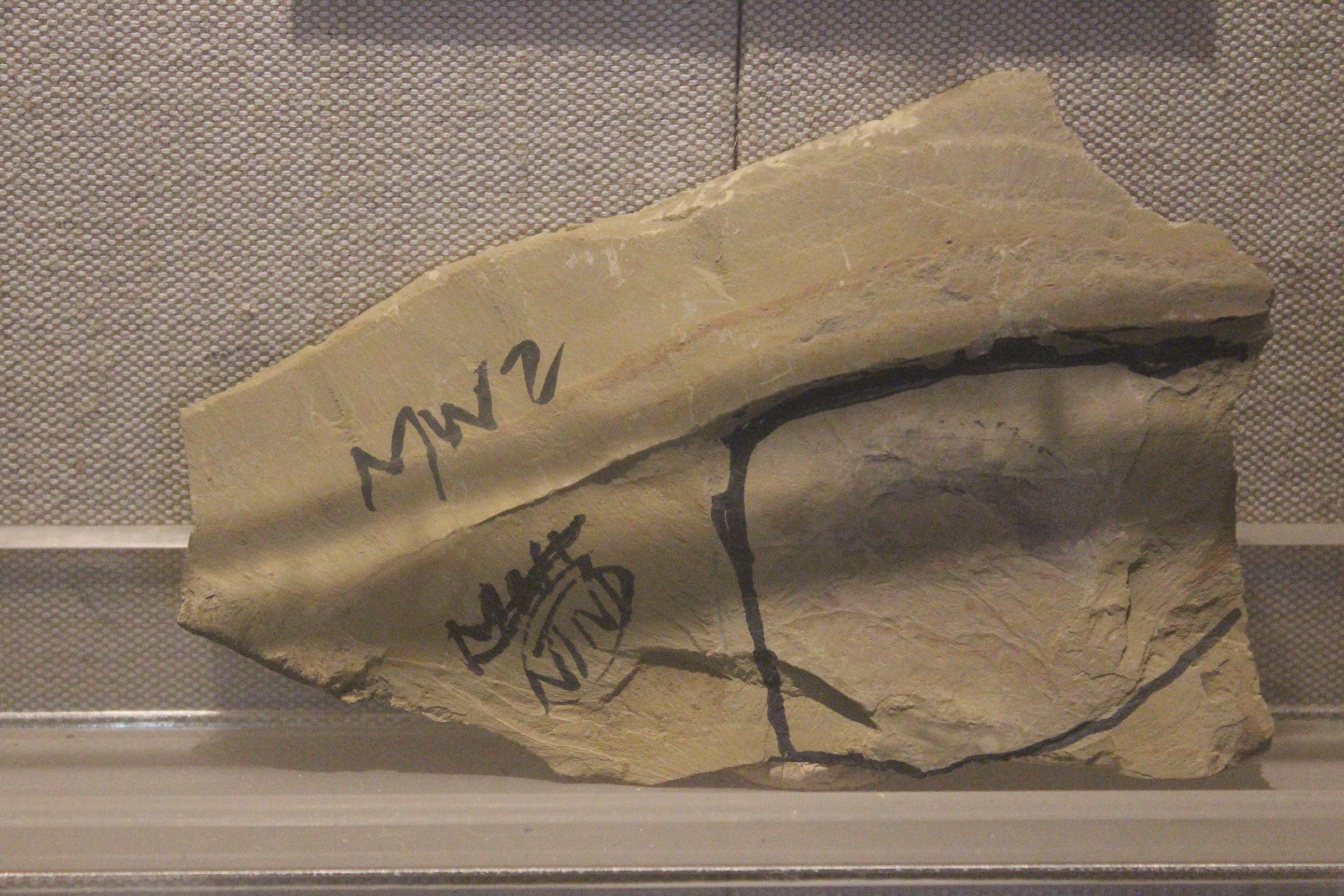
- Fossil specimen (IVPP I0241), Paleozoological Museum of China

Scientific classification
- Kingdom: Animalia
- Clade: †Cambroernida
- Class: †Eldonioidea
- Family: †Eldoniidae
- Genus: †Stellostomites; Sun & Hou 1997

Type species
- S. eumorphus Sun & Hou 1997

Species
- S. eumorphus Sun & Hou 1997 (=Y. elegans Sun & Hou 1997; =?E. eumorpha (Sun & Hou 1997))

Synonyms
- Yunnanomedusa Sun & Hou 1997; ?Eldonia Walcott 1911

= Stellostomites =

Stellostomites Temporal range: Chengjiang

Extinct genus of disc-shaped animals

Stellostomites is a discoidal animal known from the Cambrian Chengjiang biota. It is classified with the eldoniids, and considered a junior synonym of Eldonia by some authors.
