= Paropsonema =

Paropsonema Temporal range: Devonian

Scientific classification
- Kingdom: Animalia
- Stem group: Ambulacraria
- Clade: †Cambroernida
- Class: †Eldonioidea
- Clade: †Paropsonemida
- Genus: †Paropsonema; Clarke 1900

Type species
- †P. cryptophya Clarke 1900

Species
- †P. cryptophya Clarke 1900; ? †P. mirabile Chapman 1926

Extinct genus of Devonian animals

Paropsonema is an eldonioid known from the Devonian of upstate New York and (if P. mirabile is a species of Paropsonema rather than Discophyllum) the Silurian of southern Australia. It is the latest-surviving known member of the Eldonioidea and Cambroernida.

A specimen described in 2018 may represent an additional species, but has been tentatively assigned to P. cryptohya; it represents the youngest described paropsonemid.

The species Discophyllum mirabile has been thought to be closer to Paropsonema than to the sole previously-described species of Discophyllum, D. peltata. As a result, sources treat it as Paropsonema mirabile. Conversely, at least one worker has treated P. cryptophya as a member of Discophyllum, D. cryptophya, although this has not been followed by later authors. Regardless, Paropsonema and Discophyllum are grouped together informally as "paropsonemids."
