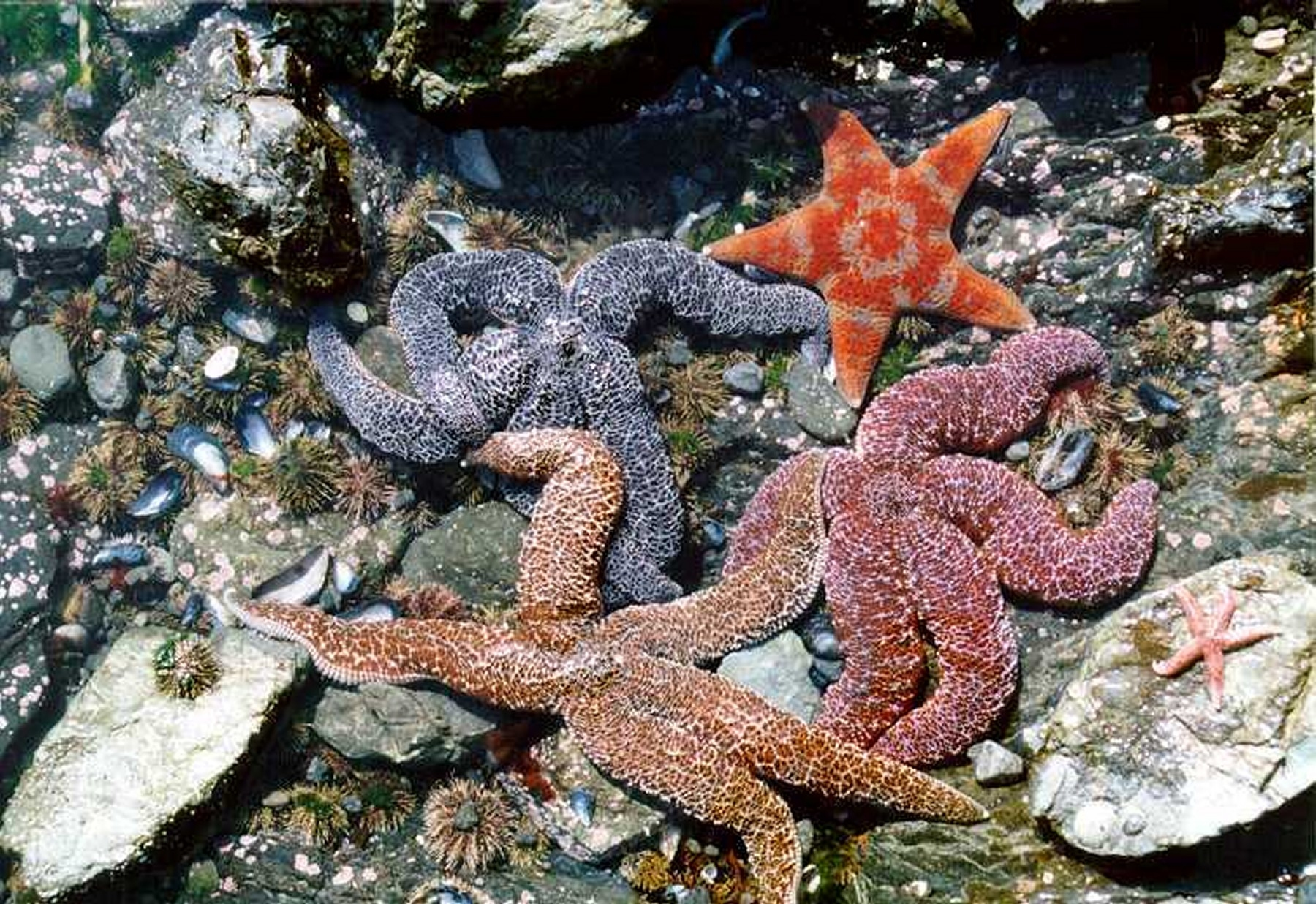
- Various sea stars and sea urchins among mussel shells in the rocky intertidal zone of Kachemak Bay, southern Alaska, United States

Scientific classification
- Kingdom: Animalia
- Subkingdom: Eumetazoa
- Clade: ParaHoxozoa
- Clade: Bilateria
- Clade: Nephrozoa
- Superphylum: Deuterostomia
- Clade: Ambulacraria; Metchnikoff, 1881

Clade
- Echinodermata; Hemichordata; †Cambroernida; †Yujingia; †Yanjiahella (?); †Vetulocystida (?)

= Ambulacraria =

Ambulacrarians Temporal range: Early Cambrian–Recent

Clade of deuterostomes containing echinoderms and hemichordates

Ambulacraria /ˌæmbjuːləˈkrɛəriə/, or Coelomopora /siːləˈmɒpərə/, is a clade of invertebrate phyla that includes echinoderms and hemichordates; a member of this group is called an ambulacrarian. Phylogenetic analysis suggests the echinoderms and hemichordates separated around 533 million years ago. The Ambulacraria are part of the deuterostomes, a clade that also includes the many Chordata, and the few extinct species belonging to the Vetulicolia.

== Etymology ==
Ambulacraria, from the latin ambulacrum, meaning "a walk planted with trees", was named by Élie Metchnikoff in reference to the larval similarities including a folded band lined with cillia that are used for both feeding and locomotion. Metchnikoff also noted similarities among the coelomic systems of echinoderms and hemichordates and their larvae.

== Phylogeny ==
The two living clades with representative organisms are:

- Echinodermata (sea stars, sea urchins, brittle stars, sea cucumbers, feather stars, sea lilies, etc.)
- Hemichordata (acorn worms (Enteropneusta) and Pterobranchia (including Graptolithina))

(These together sometimes are called the lower deuterostomes.)

Whether the Xenacoelomorpha clade is the sister group to the Ambulacraria remains a contentious issue, with some authors arguing that the former should be placed more basally among metazoans, and other authors asserting that the best choices of phylogenetic methods support the position of Xenacoelomorpha as the sister group to Ambulacraria.

A third, extinct clade known as the Cambroernida has recently been recognized as part of the ambulacrarian stem group. The morphology of this group suggests that the ancestral deuterostome did not possess a post-anal tail, which evolved convergently in chordates and hemichordates, and possessed gill slits but not additional structures such as the gill bars found in hemichordates.

Two extinct taxa of uncertain placement, the Vetulocystida and Yanjiahella, have each been proposed as either stem-group echinoderms or stem-group ambulacrarians. Vetulocystids have also been tentatively proposed as the basal-most stem-group chordates, while Yanjiahella has also been proposed to be a stem-group hemichordate.

The following cladogram is based on a simplification of Li et al. 2023, with the possible placements of uncertain potential ambulacrarians shown with dashed lines and question marks:

- Deuterostomia
  - ? Xenambulacraria
    - ? Xenacoelomorpha
    - Ambulacraria (total group)
      - ? †Vetulocystida
      - †Cambroernida
      - ? †Yanjiahella
      - Ambulacraria (crown group)
        - Echinodermata (total group)
          - ? †Vetulocystida
          - ? †Yanjiahella
          - Echinodermata (crownward)
        - Hemichordata (total group)
          - ? †Yanjiahella
          - Hemichordata (crownward)
  - Chordata (total group)
    - ? †Vetulocystida
    - Chordata (crownward)

Cladogram modified after He et al. 2026, showing vetulocystids outside of ambulacraria and Yujingia occupying a position closer to the crown of ambulacraria than the cambroernids.

- Deuterostomia
  - Chordata (total group)
    - - - - Chordata (crown group)
          - †Pikaia
        - †Yunnanozoon
      - - †Vetulicolidae
        - †Ooedigera
        - †Didazoonidae
        - †Banffozoa
      - †Nesonektris
    - †Vetulocystida
  - Ambulacraria (total group)
    - - Ambulacraria (crown group)
        - Echinodermata
        - Hemichordata
          - Pterobranchia (total group)
            - Pterobranchia (crown group)
            - †Gyaltsenglossus
          - Enteropneusta (total group)
            - Enteropneusta (crown group)
            - †Spartobranchus
            - †Oesia
      - †Yujingia
    - †Cambroernida
      - - †Eldonioidea
          - †Rotadiscus
          - - †Eldonia eumorpha
            - †Eldonia ludwigi
            - †Pararotadiscus
        - †Phlogites
      - †Herpetogaster

== Ontogeny ==
As for many animals, the egg cell of any extant ambulacrarian divides and develops into a blastula ("cell ball"), which develops into a triploblast ("three-layered") gastrula. The gastrula then develops into a dipleurula larva form in the Asteroidea, Holothuroidea, Crinoidea, and Hemichordata, and into a pluteus larva form in the Echinoidea and Ophiuroidea. This, in its turn, is developed in various different kinds of larvae for different taxa of ambulacrarians.

It has been suggested that the adult form of the last common ancestor of the ambulacrarians was anatomically similar to the dipleurula larva; this hypothetic ancestor sometimes also is called dipleurula.
