= Shankouclava =

Shankouclava Temporal range: Cambrian Stage 3, 518 Ma
- Restoration of S. anningense.

Scientific classification
- Kingdom: Animalia
- Phylum: Chordata
- Subphylum: Tunicata
- Genus: †Shankouclava; Chen et al., 2003

Type species
- †Shankouclava anningense Chen et al., 2003

Species
- †S. anningense Chen et al., 2003; †S. shankouense Chen et al., 2003

Extinct genus of tunicate

Shankouclava is an extinct genus of tunicates. It is one of two candidates for the oldest member of this group, dating to 518 million years ago. It has been found in the Lower Cambrian Maotianshan Shale at Shankou village, Anning, near Kunming (South China). Each of the eight specimens found and used for description were isolated, suggesting that the genus was solitary and not colonial.

== Morphology ==
Shankouclava had a soft, sac-like body that was elongated and pointed proximally. The body lengths of individuals vary from 2 cm (0.8 in) to 4 cm (1.6 in).

== Etymology ==
The generic name is composed of the fossil locality, Shankou, and the Latin word clava (club-shaped).

== Classification ==
A stem group tunicate affinity for Shankouclava has been broadly accepted, though some authors have expressed reservations that the evidence in favour of this affinity is not conclusive.

Doubts regarding Shankouclava's tunicate affinities arose in the context of a long-running debate that began when the paper announcing Shankouclava disputed the tunicate affinities of Cheungkongella, which was known from a single fossil discovered in 2001, and proposed that Cheungkongella is the junior synonym of Phlogites. This challenge relied on characteristics of newly-discovered Phlogites specimens, and was made despite the lack of obvious Phlogites-like tentacles in the Cheungkongella specimen. A response several years later similarly questioned Shankouclava by way of new Shankouclava-like specimens that clearly display tentacles. While Shankouclava has not been equated with Phlogites, the presence of Phlogites-like tentacles would make a tunicate affinity unlikely.

Another Cambrian tunicate, Megasiphon, known from a single specimen from the slightly younger Marjum Formation, resembles more closely the morphology of surviving tunicates.
