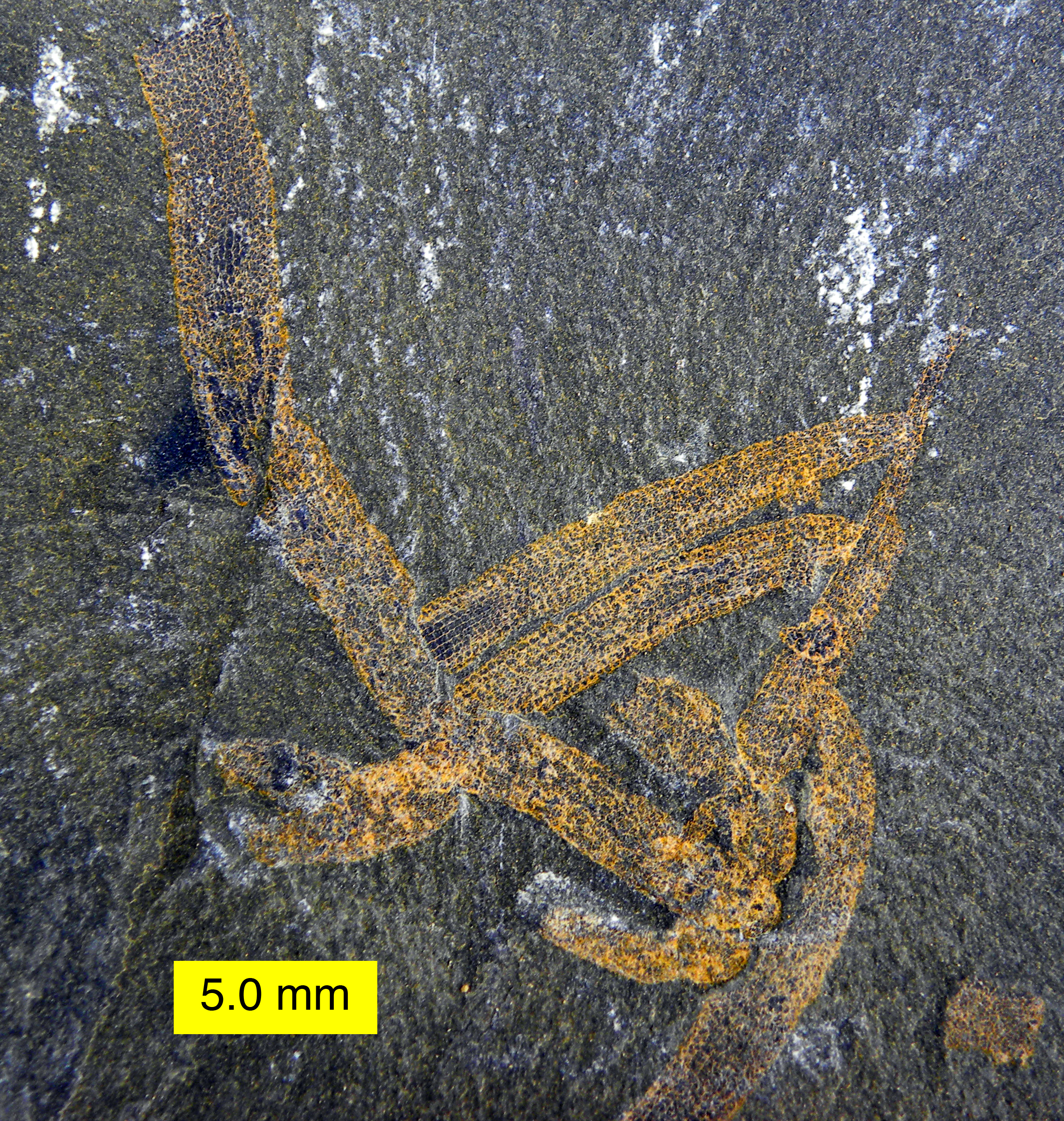
- Vauxia from the Walcott Quarry of the Burgess Shale (Middle Cambrian)

Scientific classification
- Kingdom: Animalia
- Phylum: Porifera
- Class: Demospongiae
- Order: Verongiida
- Family: †Vauxiidae
- Genus: †Vauxia; Walcott, 1920

Species
- V. ampliata Rigby 1986; V. bellula Walcott, 1920; V. densa Walcott, 1920; V. dignata Walcott, 1920; V. gracilenta Walcott, 1920; ?V. magna Rigby, 1980; V. venata Walcott, 1920

= Vauxia =

Vauxia Temporal range: Cambrian Stage 3 - Late Silurian

Extinct genus of sponges

Vauxia is an extinct genus of demosponge that had a distinctive branching mode of growth. Each branch consisted of a network of strands. Vauxia also had a skeleton of spongin (flexible organic material) common to modern day sponges. Much like Choia and other sponges, Vauxia fed by extracting nutrients from the water.

Herpetogaster, an extinct genus of Early Cambrian animals, attached to branches of Vauxia through a flexible, extensible stolon. It is not known whether the attachment was permanent.

Vauxia is named after Mount Vaux, a mountain in Yoho National Park, British Columbia. It was first described in 1920 by Charles Doolittle Walcott.

Vauxia fossils are found in North America, specifically in the United States and Canada.
