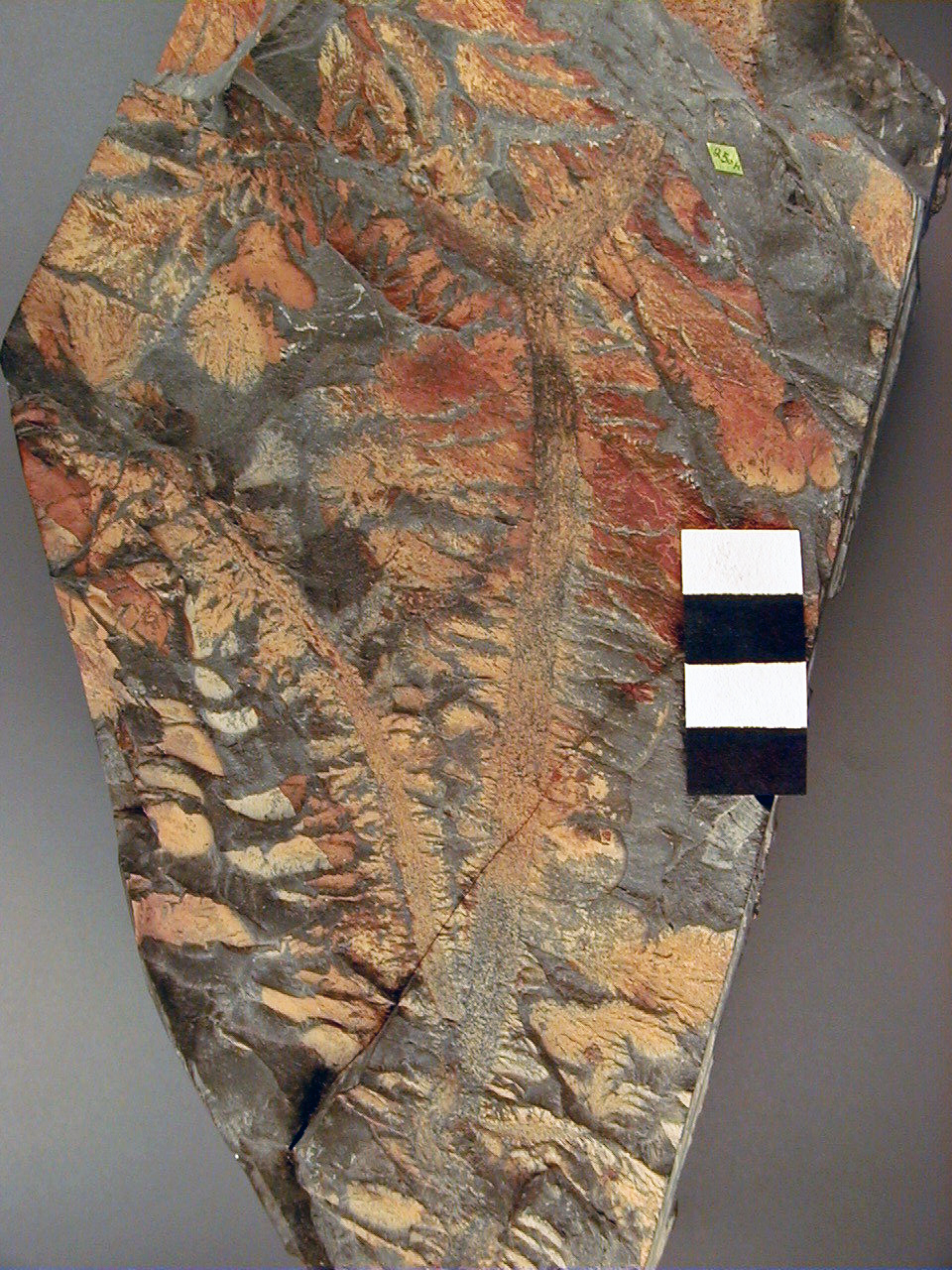
- M. dorus fossil

Scientific classification
- Domain: incertae sedis
- Genus: †Margaretia; Walcott, 1931
- Species: †M. dorus

Binomial name
- †Margaretia dorus Walcott, 1931

= Margaretia =

Margaretia Temporal range: Middle Cambrian

Cambrian fossil genus

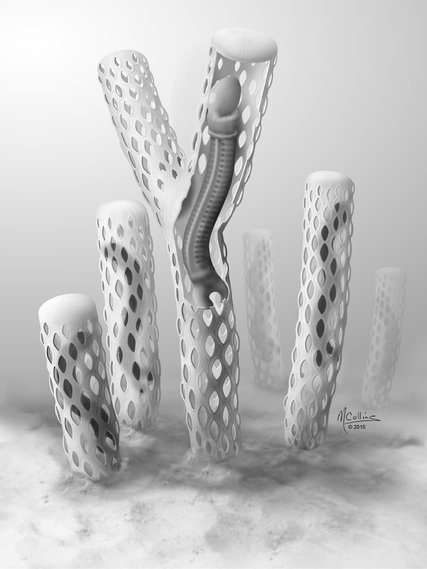
Reconstruction of M. dorus as organic tube that is associated with Oesia disjuncta

Margaretia is a frondose organism known from the middle Cambrian Burgess Shale and the Kinzers Formation of Pennsylvania. Its fronds reached about 10 cm in length and are peppered with a range of length-parallel oval holes. It was originally interpreted as an alcyonarian coral. It was later reclassified as a green alga closely resembling modern Caulerpa by D.F. Satterthwait in her Ph.D. thesis in 1976, a finding supported by Conway Morris and Robison in 1988. More recently, it has been treated as an organic tube, that is used as nest of hemichordate Oesia.
