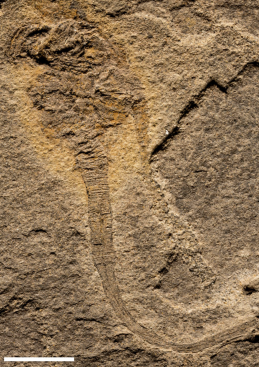
- Fossil Y. biscarpa from the Ediacaran and Fortunian of China. Scale bar=5mm

Scientific classification
- Kingdom: Animalia
- Phylum: Echinodermata (?)
- Genus: †Yanjiahella; Guo et al., 2012
- Species: †Y. biscarpa

Binomial name
- †Yanjiahella biscarpa Guo et al., 2012

Synonyms
- Yanjiahella ancarpa Guo et al., 2012; Yanjiahella monocarpa Guo et al., 2012

= Yanjiahella =

Yanjiahella Temporal range: Fortunian ~539–529 Ma

Extinct genus of marine invertebrates

Yanjiahella biscarpa is an extinct species of Early Cambrian deuterostome which may represent the earliest stem group echinoderm.

This species is known from the Fortunian Yanjiahe Formation (~541.0–534.6 Ma) in Hubei province, China and was first described by Guo et al. who had difficulty in assigning a taxonomy to the animal due to the shared nature of its features between the hemichordates and echinoderms.

== Etymology ==
The Yanjiahella genus takes its name from the Yanjiahe Formation combined with the Latin diminutive "-ella" in reference to the small size of the species with the species name biscarpa deriving from the Latin "bis" meaning two, and Greek "carpa" meaning arms.

Guo et al. originally divided the Yanjiahella genus into three species based on the number of feeding appendages, Y. ancarpa (meaning "no armed") Y. monocarpa (meaning "single armed") and Y. biscarpa. However, analysis by Topper et al. showed identical morphological features between the three initial species, and that the varying number of these appendages was due to their lack of preservation in some specimens and joined all species identified by Guo et al. as Y. biscarpa.

== Description ==
Yanjiahella biscarpa is described from 35 specimens. Yanjiahella biscarpa was a small, bilateral deuterostome animal typically 20-50 mm in length with a stem, theca and two feeding appendages. The stem is divided into two parts, distal and proximal. The proximal stem displays transverse ridges and a medial ridge interpreted as a linear digestive tract, with the anus interpreted as located above the junction between the proximal and distal stem. The proximal stem was likely lightly mineralized, aiding in support for the theca. The distal part of the stem is typically curved with lineations indicative of musculature and interpreted as a holdfast used to anchor the animal either erect or prostrate in the sediment.

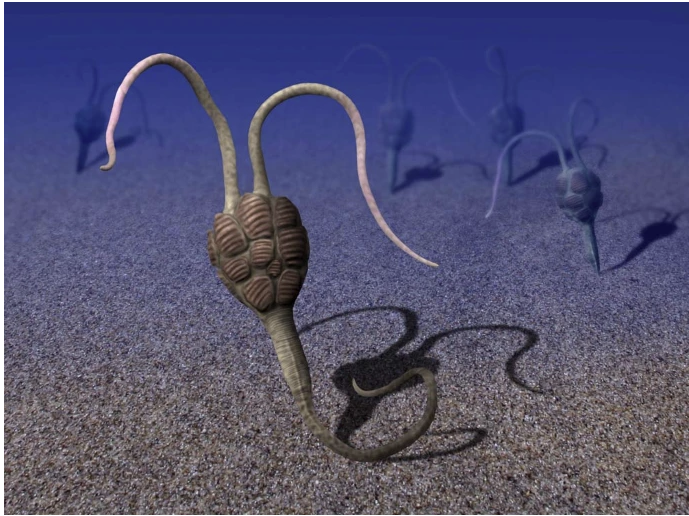
Artist's conception of living Y. Biscarpa. Artist: Nobumichi Tamura

The theca of Y. biscarpa was covered in small ovoid to polygonal plates typically 1-2 mm in length arranged in an uneven distribution. The feeding appendages emerge from opposite sides of the theca, and extend 15-20 mm with one specimen possessing arms 43 mm in length. The nature of the feeding appendages is ambiguous, with no conclusive observations supporting a muscular, collagenous or vascular make up. The mouth is interpreted as being located between the feeding appendages on the body though it has not been observed in any specimen.

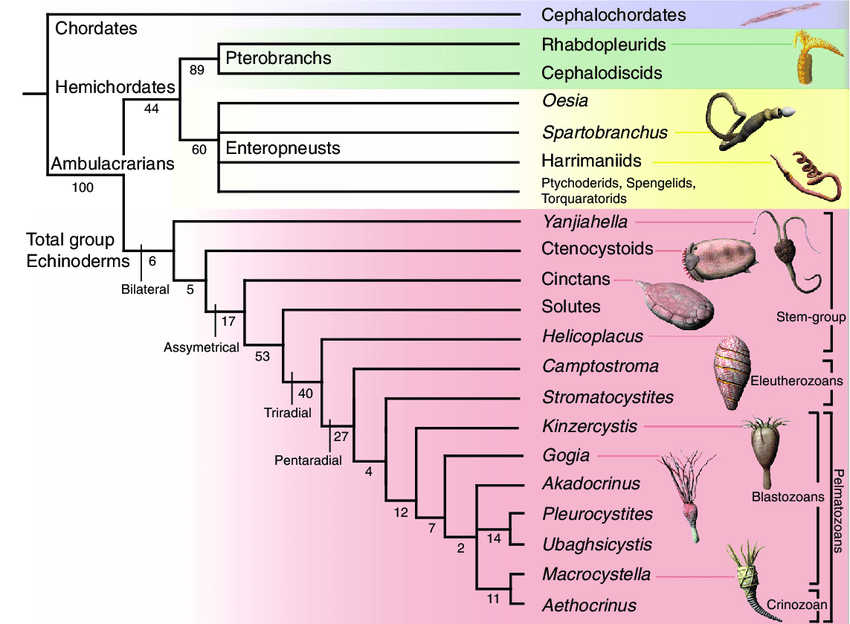
Phylogenetic tree showing position of Y. biscarpa proposed by Topper et al.

== Taxonomic classification ==
The classification of Y. biscarpa is difficult due to sharing features with the sister phylum hemichordates, most notably the muscled stalk and linear digestive tract. However, the presence of the plated body structure has led to its placement with other echinoderms. Guo et al. tentatively placed the Yanjiahella genus, including Y. biscarpa in the echinoderm phylum, and later investigation by Topper et al. placed Y. biscarpa in order echinodermata based on the nature of the theca and phylogenetic analysis which indicated Y. biscarpa was a basal echinoderm. Topper et al. proposed that Y. biscarpa was a basal member of the echinoderm family sharing traits with the last common ambulacrarian ancestor. Later early echinoderms such as the ctenocystoids lost the muscular stalk of these basal echinoderms, while maintaining bilateral form before evolving the familiar pentaradial symmetry of later echinoderms, indicating that the bilateralism was a common trait among early echinoderms.

=== Dispute over classification ===
Zamora et al. dispute the placement of Y. biscarpa with the echinoderms based on the lack of features typifying echinoderms: stereom, pentaradial symmetry, and a water vascular system. These authors additionally conducted an independent phylogenetic analysis, which placed Y. biscarpa with the hemichordates. Topper et al. responded to these criticisms by acknowledging the difficulty of interpreting early Cambrian fossils, while noting that the common basal stem animals of the Cambrian often lacked the typical features of their crown groups early in their evolutionary stages, and thus interpreting the fossil based these features is unwarranted. Additional analysis of specimens to identify stereom structures by Topper et al. was conducted and no evidence of stereom was observed. Topper et al. pointed to the lack of observed stereom structures in other Cambrian echinoderm fossils due to taphonomic factors, and thus the lack of stereom observed in Y. biscarpa is not evidence of absence.

== Significance for echinoderm evolution ==
Yanjiahella biscarpa appears to represent the most basal form of the echinoderms predating other echinoderm groups by several million years, and represents one of the earliest deuterostome animals. The similar features to its ambulacrarian ancestors is likely to help further elucidate the divergence of echinoderms and their early evolutionary history. Yanjiahella biscarpa provides further evidence that echinoderms evolved their familiar pentaradial symmetry after their emergence as a distinct group in the early Cambrian.
