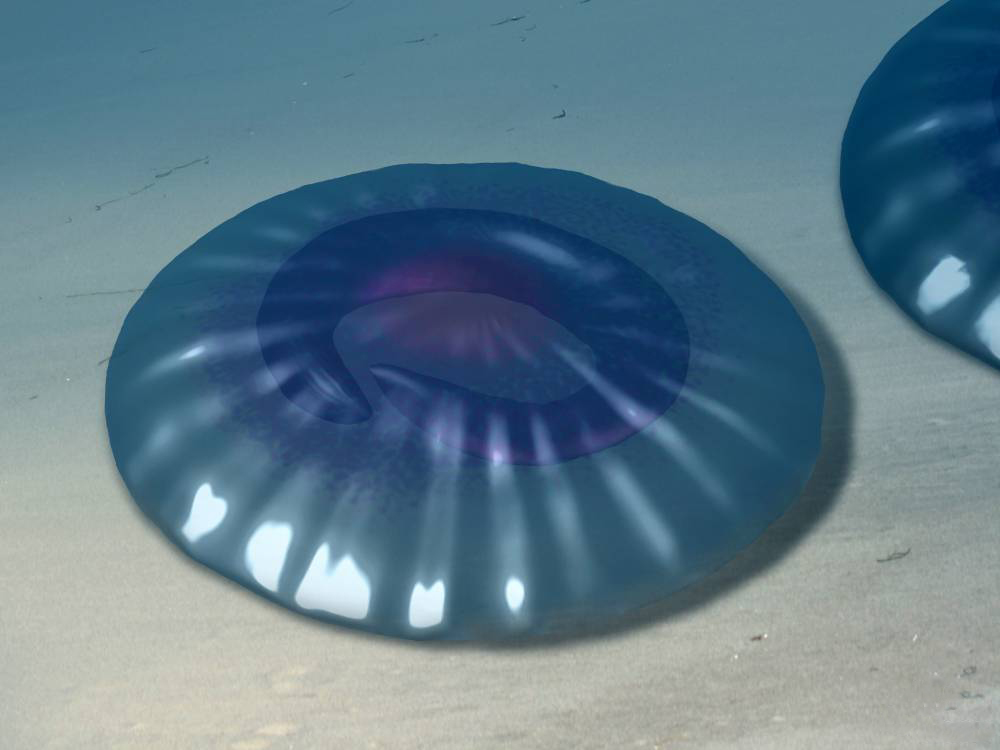
- Life reconstruction of Eldonia ludwigi
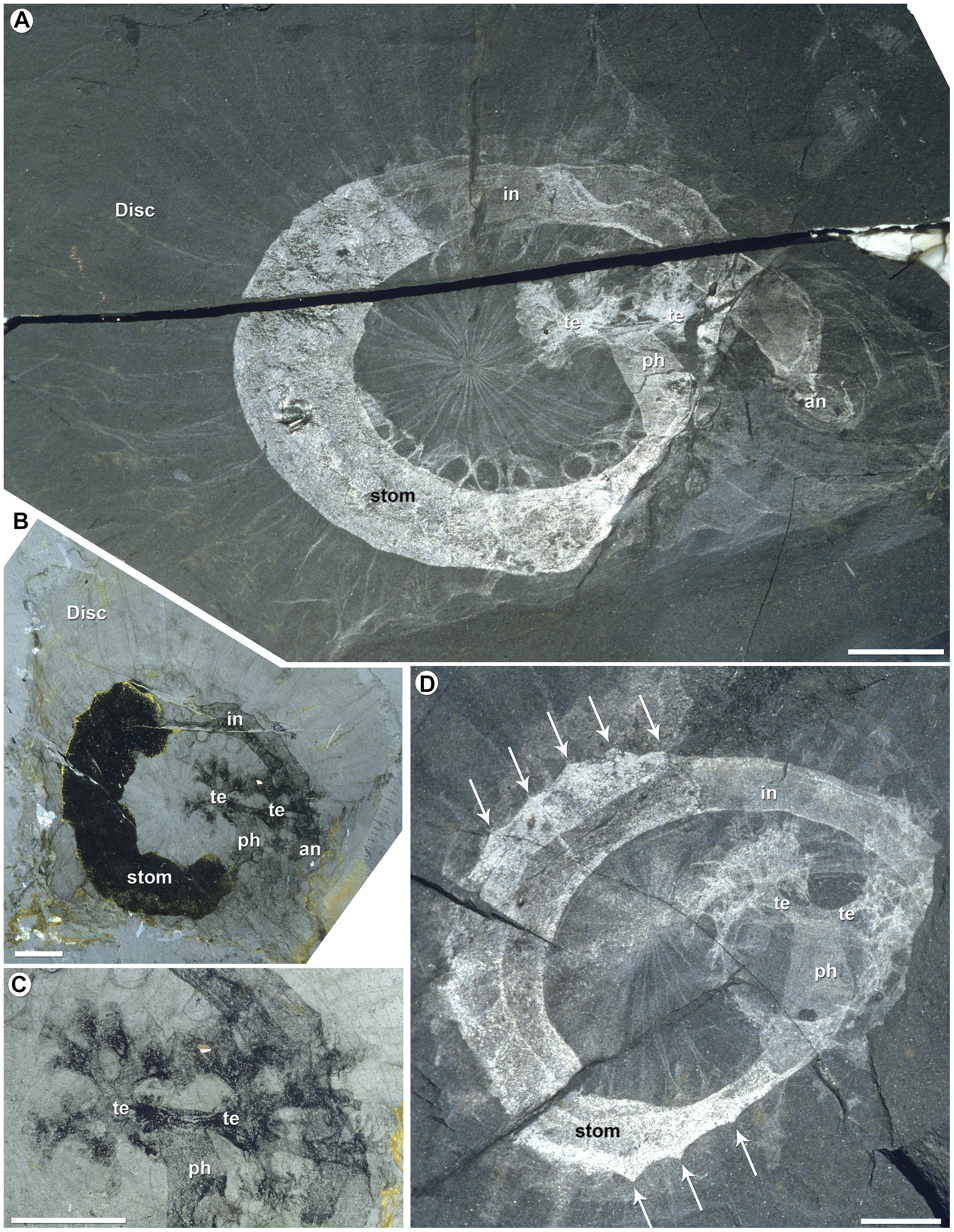
- Eldonia ludwigi from the middle Cambrian Burgess Shale

Scientific classification
- Kingdom: Animalia
- Stem group: Ambulacraria
- Clade: †Cambroernida
- Class: †Eldonioidea
- Family: †Eldoniidae
- Genus: †Eldonia; Walcott, 1911

Type species
- †Eldonia ludwigi Walcott, 1911

Species
- †Eldonia ludwigi; †Eldonia eumorpha

Synonyms
- †Yunnanomedusa Sun & Hou 1987; ? †Stellostomites Sun & Hou 1987

= Eldonia =

Eldonia Temporal range: Cambrian Stage 3–Drumian

Extinct genus of soft-bodied animals

Eldonia is an extinct soft-bodied cambroernid best known from the Fossil Ridge outcrops of the Burgess Shale, particularly in the 'Great Eldonia layer' in the Walcott Quarry. In addition to over 550 specimens collected by Walcott, 224 specimens of Eldonia are known from the Greater Phyllopod bed, where they comprise 0.43% of the community. Species also occur in the Chengjiang biota, and Siberia.

== Description ==
It takes the form of a round, medusoid disk (which originally led to suggestions of a jellyfish affinity) with a C-shaped gut trace. The gut is recalcitrant and can be extracted using Hydrofluoric acid.

A specimen from the Lower Ordovician Madaoyu Formation in Hunan, China, can be interpreted as the incomplete body of Eldonia or the similar animal. However, its annulation, the structure of the intestine and the shape of the body are more similar to those of Ottoia.

== Classification ==
Walcott's original interpretation as a holothurian was rapidly disputed. Alternative affinities to be suggested, which did not stand the test of time, included the siphonophores and a coelenterate medusa.

Eldonia and the other Eldoniidae form a clade, Eldonioidea, with the Rotadiscidae and the informal group known as the paropsonemids. The Eldonioidea are, in turn, part of the stem-ambulacrarian clade Cambroernida.

Some authors consider Eldonia eumorpha to be a distinct genus, Stellostomites, as S. eumorphus.

"Eldonia berbera", from Upper Ordovician strata of Morocco, was determined to be a junior synonym of the paropsonemid Discophyllum peltatum in 2026.

== Paleoecology ==
The organism is frequently found in association with the lobopod Microdictyon, which is presumed to have fed on Eldonia.

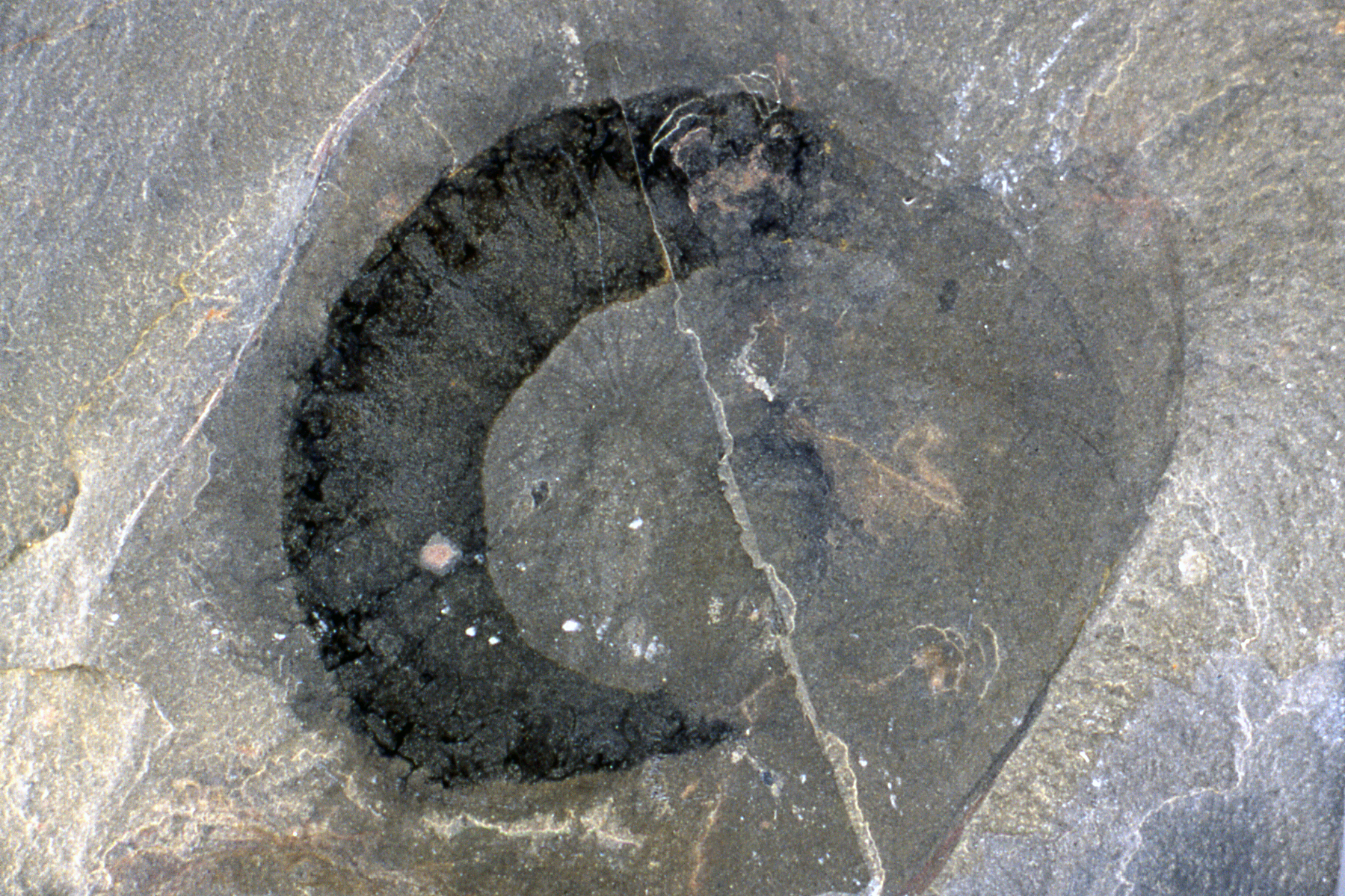
Eldonia ludwigii, around 4 cm long. Walcott Quarry.

== Species ==
- Eldonia ludwigi (Walcott, 1911): Known from the Middle Cambrian (Wuliuan to Drumian) Burgess Shale, Spence Shale, and Marjum Formation, all along the Cambrian coast of Laurentia.
- Eldonia eumorpha (Sun & Hou, 1987): Extends the range of this genus back to Cambrian Stage 3 Chiungchussu Formation, China.

== See also ==
- Paleobiota of the Burgess Shale
- Paleobiota of the Maotianshan Shales
