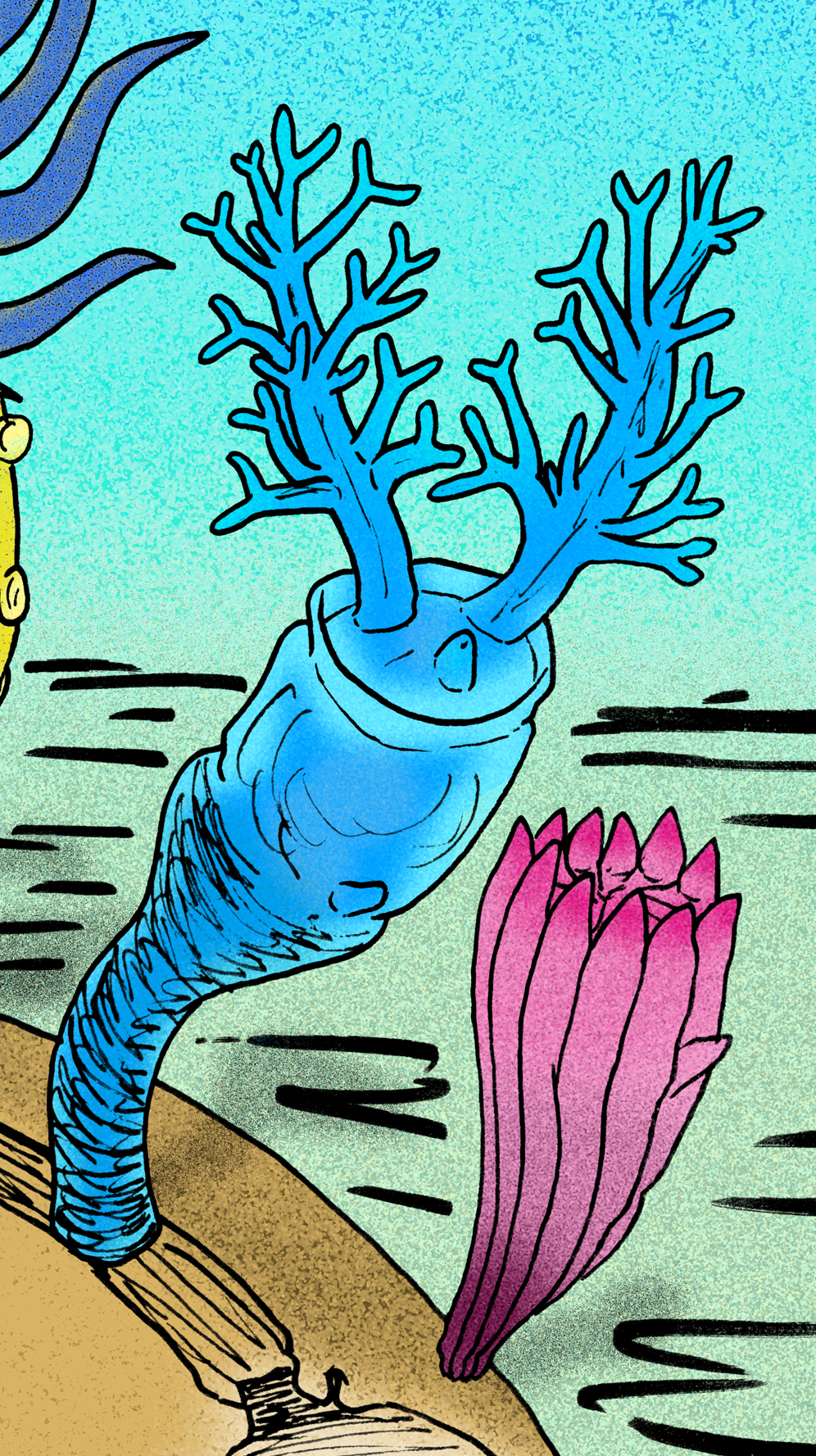
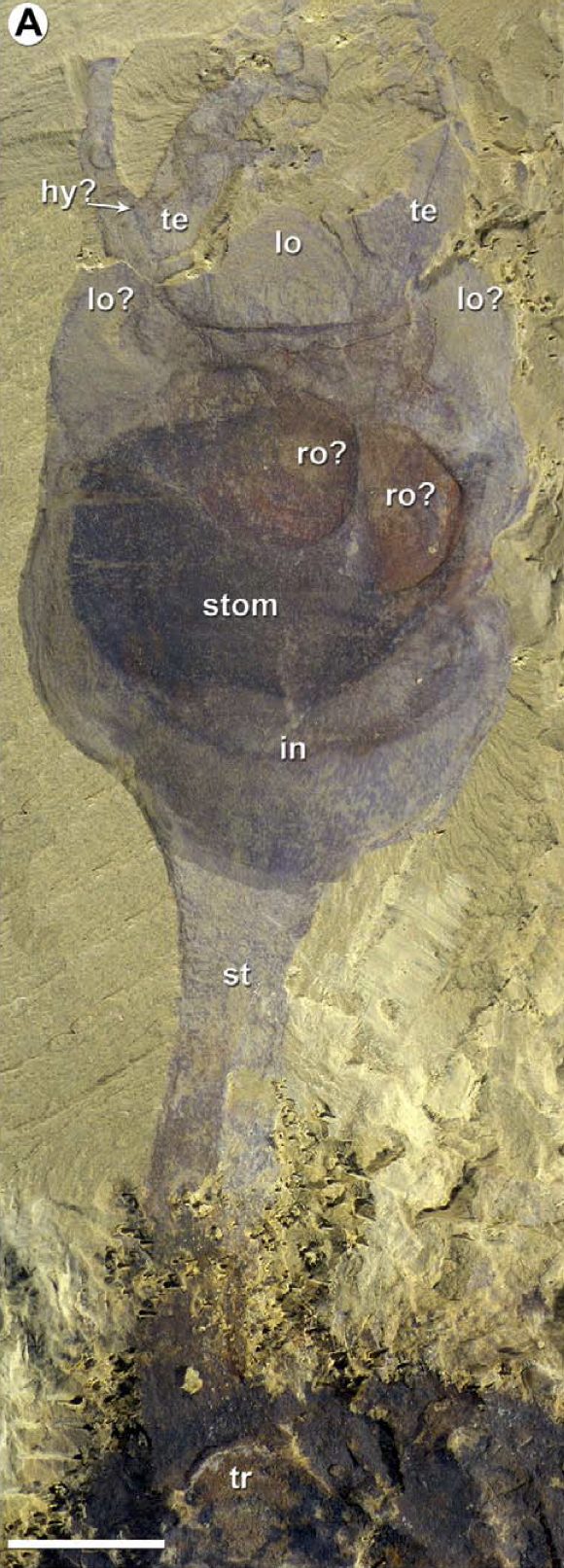
- Restoration of Phlogites (with tentacles extended) Phlogites longus fossil

Scientific classification
- Kingdom: Animalia
- Superphylum: Deuterostomia
- Stem group: Ambulacraria
- Clade: †Cambroernida
- Genus: †Phlogites; Luo & Hu, 1999
- Species: †P. longus

Binomial name
- †Phlogites longus Luo & Hu, 1999

Synonyms
- †Phlogites brevis Luo & Hu 1999; †Cheungkongella ancestralis ? Shu et al. 2001

= Phlogites =

Phlogites Temporal range: Lower Cambrian

Genus of ambulacrarians

Phlogites is a member of the extinct ambulacrarian stem group Cambroernida, occupying an intermediate position between the basal Herpetogaster and the more derived Eldonioidea. It is known from the Lower Cambrian Haikou Chengjiang deposits of China.

== Description ==
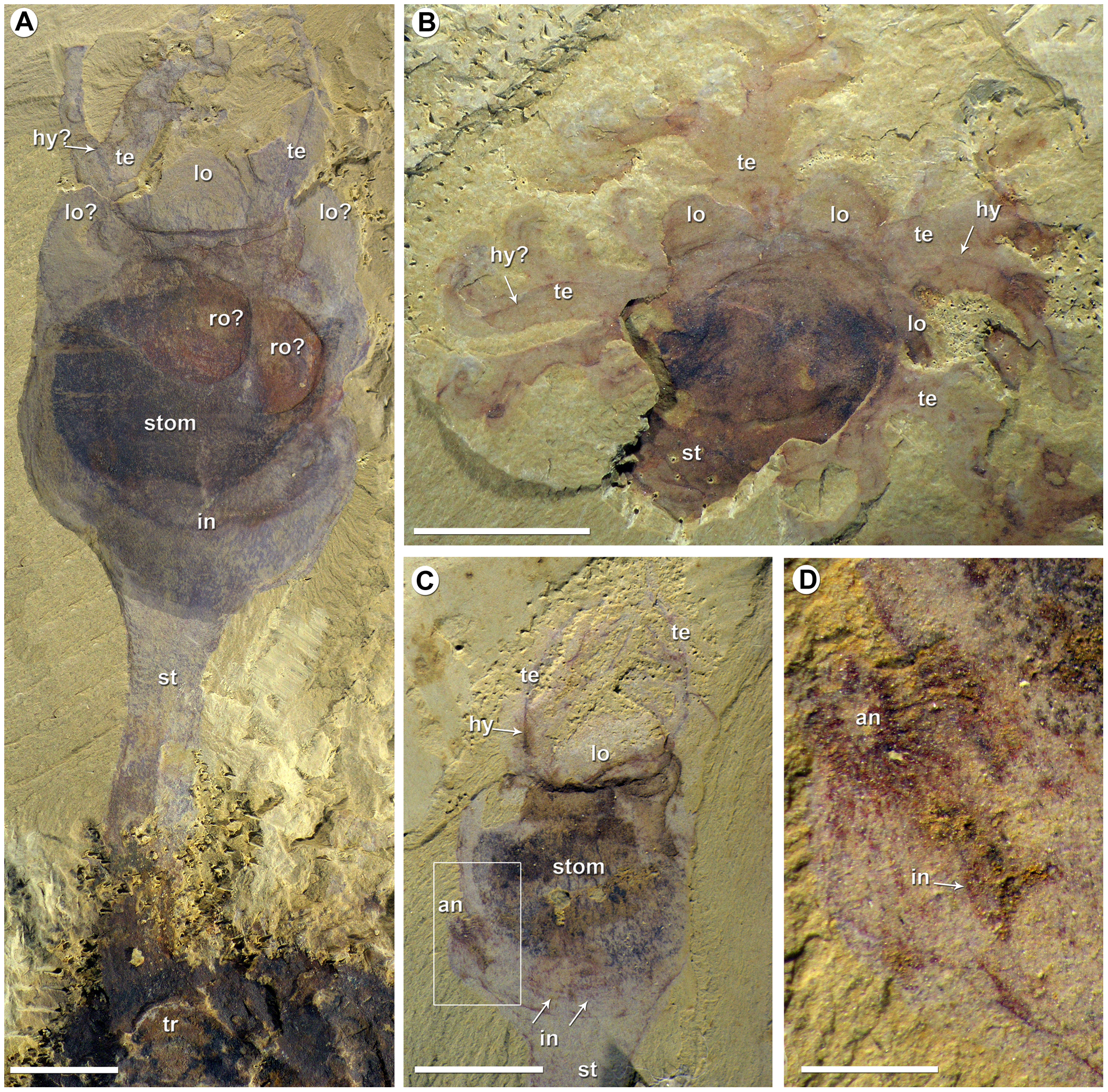
Phlogites longus te: tentacles, lo: lobes, hy: hydrostatic canal, ro: reproductive organs, stom: stomach, in: intestine, an: anus, st: stolon, tr: trilobite fragment. Note the four tentacles (with a fifth possibly hidden where the stolon is visible) with rounded lobes between them in the oral view image B.

Phlogites was a cup-shaped animal with a branching tentacular feeding system leading to a dextrally coiled gut with a lateral anus. Sources differ as to the number of tentacles, with two, three, three or five, or four or five tentacles said to be on the anterior part of the calyx. Smooth semi-circular lobes are present between the tentacles.

Compared to the earlier-diverging cambroernid Herpetogaster, Phlogites lacked segmentation and had a more massive stolon that is contiguous with the body. The coiling present in the external form of Herpetogaster became internal, except for a small lobate extension with the anus opening laterally. The tentacles of Phlogites were also more massive, and seem to have branched dichotomously.

== Phylogeny ==
The following cladogram is simpllified from Li et al. 2023:

- Ambulacraria (total group)
  - Cambroernida
    - Herpetogaster
    - - Phlogites
      - Eldonioidea
  - Ambulacraria (crown group)
    - Hemichordata
    - Echinodermata

=== History of interpretation ===
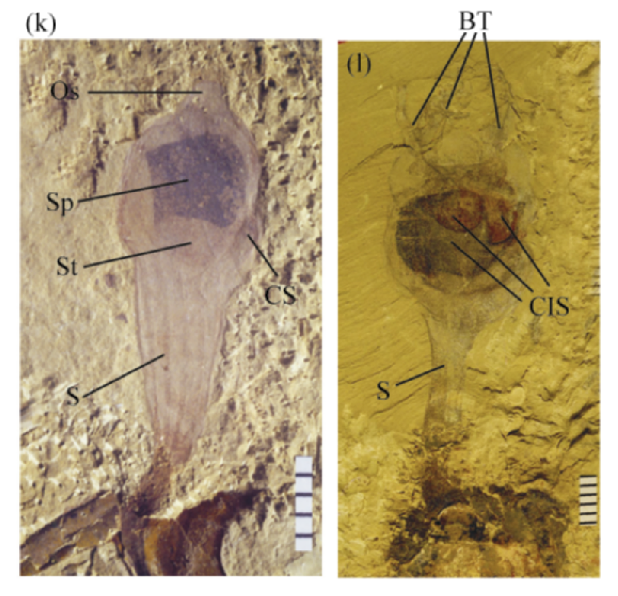
Cheungkongella ancestralis (left) and Phlogites (right) fossils for comparison (BT: branching tentacles; CIS: Complex internal organs; Os: Oral siphon; S: Stem; Sp: Simple pharynx; St: Stomach)

Phlogites was initially considered to be an early lophophorate. A new phylum, Dendrobrachia (Hou, Bergstrom, Ma and Zhao, 2006) was later proposed to encompass it. While some similarities were noted with the eldonioids (and phoronids), the authors were not sufficiently confident to either group Phlogites with the phoronids or include the eldonioids in the Dendrobrachia.

Since ICZN precedence rules do not apply at the phylum level, later researchers opted to propose cambroernids as an informal group rather than expanding the phylum Dendrobrachia, noting that "not only is the concept of phyla essentialist but it serves to place problematic taxa in a phylogenetic limbo, rendering them effectively immune to further evolutionary analysis." The informal group "cambroernids" was later given the formal name Cambroernida once further evidence was found to support its monophyly.

The interpretation of Phlogites has been complicated by its proposed equation (as a senior synonym) with the possible first-discovered Cambrian tunicate Cheungkongella ancestralis (sometimes misspelt Cheungkungella) by the discoverers of another candidate for the title of first-discovered Cambrian tunicate, Shankouclava.

The discoverers of Shankouclava agreed with the discovers of Phlogites that Phlogites is most likely a lophophorate, although they noted possible affinities with ambulacrarians or with Sipuncula. A different group of researchers agreed with synonymizing Cheungkongella with Phlogites, but proposed a new phylum, Dendrobrachia, with affinities to the Gnathifera.

Neither group proposed tunicate affinities for Phlogites, but later works by the discoverer of Shankouclava contain statements such as "although Lower Cambrian Phlogites (=Cheungkongella) was claimed as a tunicate (Shu et al., 2001)" that have led to confusion on this point by associating the tunicate affinity claims that only ever applied to Cheungkongella with Phlogites.

A researcher who was not part of any of the teams discovering Phlogites, Cheungkongella, or Shankouclava, or proposing Dendrobrachia, examined the fossils and concluded that the similarity between Phlogites and Cheungkongella was "superficial." The question of whether Cheungkongella is a synonym of Phlogites remains unresolved, but does not impact the current theory of Phlogites as a cambroernid.
