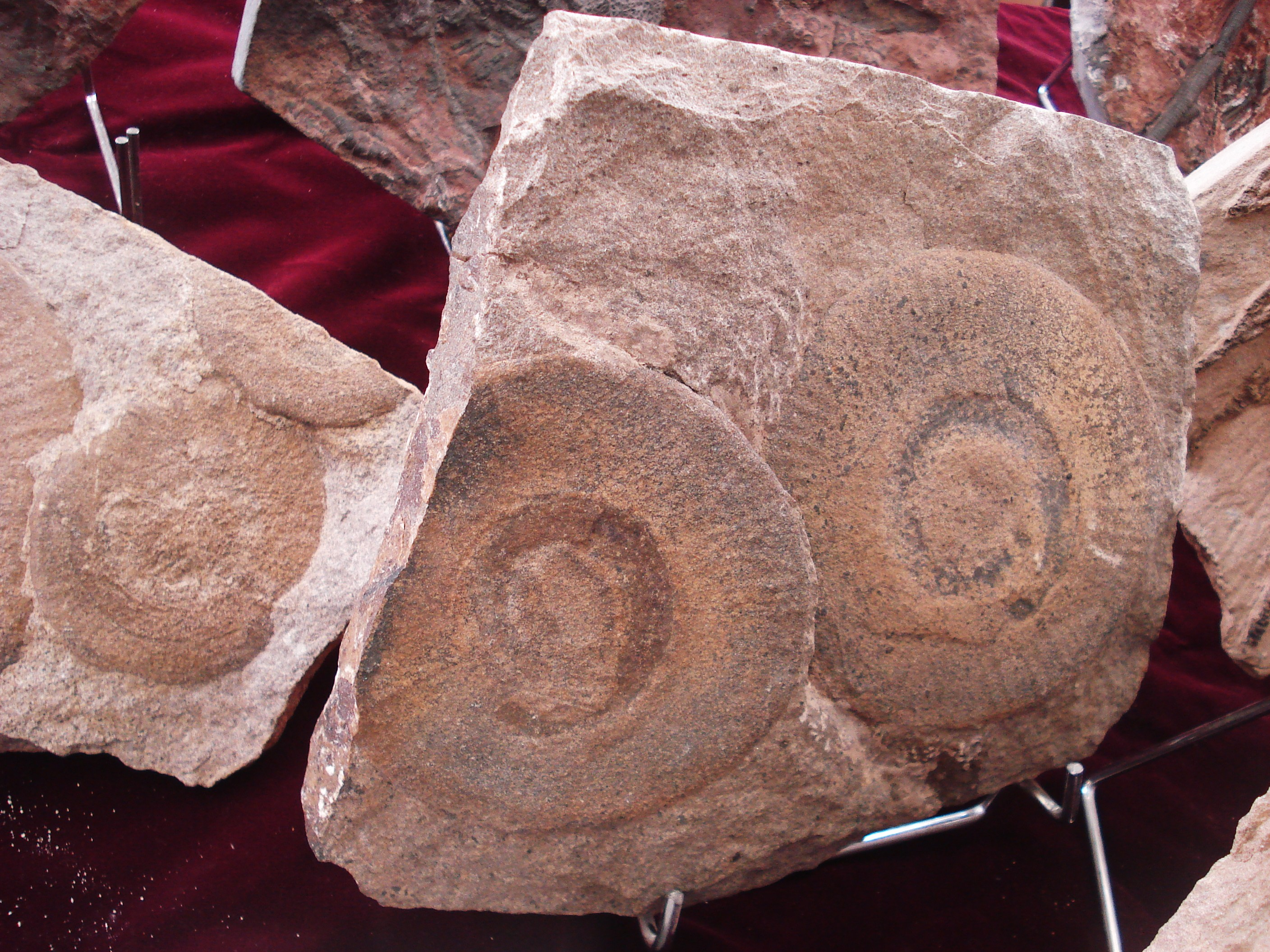
- Fossils of Discophyllum peltatum, from the Late Ordovician of Morocco

Scientific classification
- Kingdom: Animalia
- Superphylum: Deuterostomia
- Stem group: Ambulacraria
- Clade: †Cambroernida
- Class: †Eldonioidea; Dzik, 1991

Families
- Eldoniidae; Rotadiscidae; Paropsonemidae

= Eldonioid =

Eldonioidea Temporal range: Cambrian–Devonian

Extinct clade of disc-shaped animals

Eldonioids or velumbrellids are an extinct clade of disc-shaped cambroernids which lived in the early to middle Paleozoic (Cambrian to Devonian). Depending on the researcher, the clade is classified as either the class Eldonioidea (containing only the order Velumbrellida) or the order Eldonida. The lifestyle of eldonioids is still an unresolved question; some authors reconstruct eldonioids as free-floating planktonic predators similar to jellyfish, while others argue that they were passive detritivores, embedded within the seabed for much of their life.

== Names ==
The terms "eldonioid" and "eldoniid" have been used somewhat informally and interchangeably, but technically refer to members of the class Eldonioidea and the family Eldoniidae, respectively. When using the order Eldonida, the adjectival form is "eldonid".

== Anatomy ==
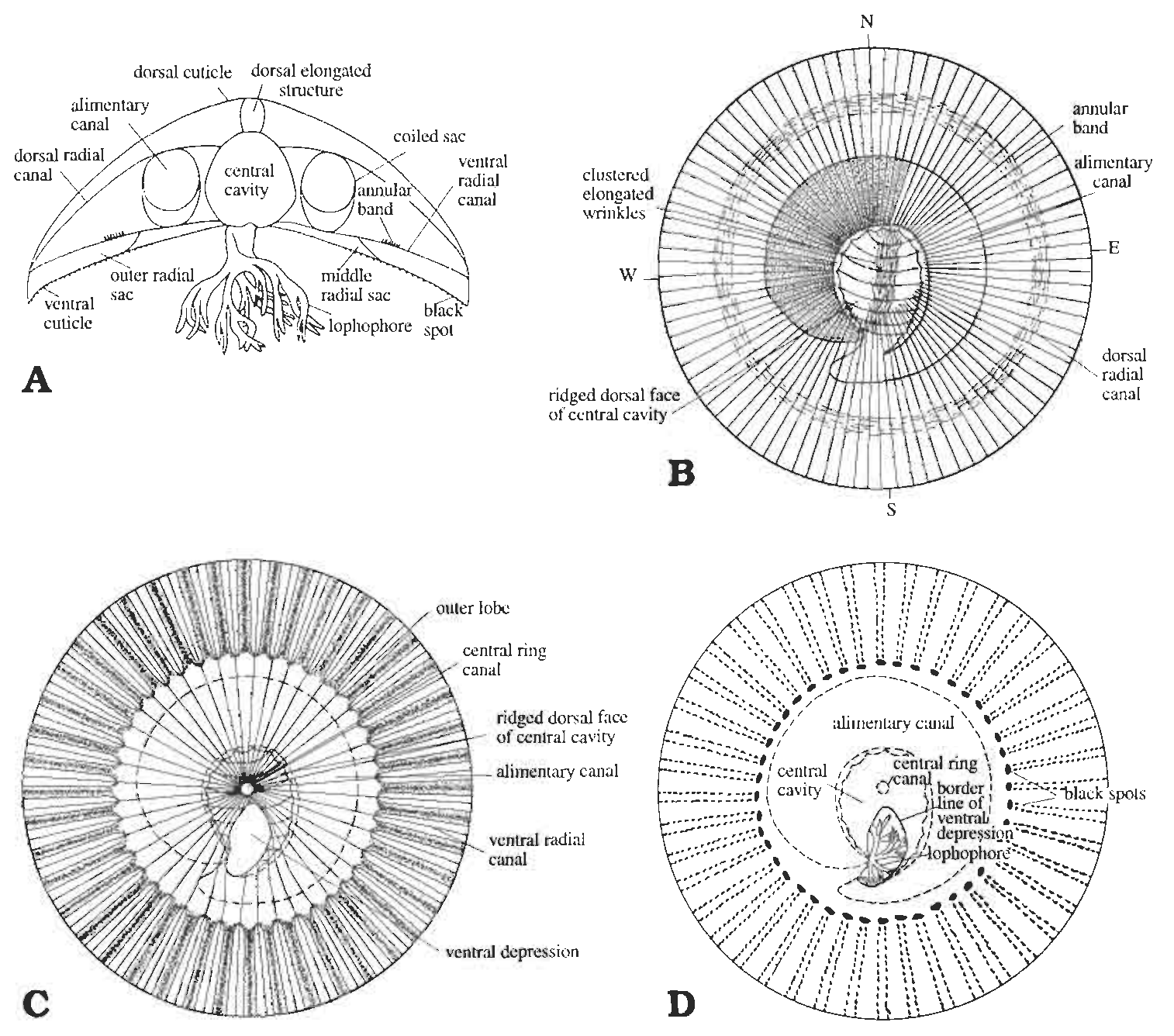
Cross-sectional diagrams of Stellostomites eumorphus (= Eldonia eumorpha). A: Vertical cross-section B: Transverse section near the dorsal disc C: Transverse section near the ventral disc D: Underside of the ventral disc

Eldonioids are characterized by their "medusoid" (jellyfish-shaped) bodies, with the form of a shallow dome opening below to an offset mouth supplemented by filamentous tentacles. Internally, they have a distinctive C-shaped cavity encompassing the gut, as well as hollow radial (radiating) structures arranged around a central ring canal. Most eldonioids are soft-bodied and can only be preserved in lagerstätten, but a few species may have hosted mineralized deposits. Historically, the affinities of eldonioids was enigmatic; recently, they been assessed as cambroernid deuterostomes.

The basic eldonioid body plan is oriented around two circular discs sealed together with the viscera in between. The ventral (lower) disc is concave from below while the dorsal (upper) is convex from above, providing a dome-like profile to the body. The rim of the body is smooth, though the margin may furl slightly inwards under the ventral disc. Sediment infillings or differences in preservation allow for hollow internal structures to be differentiated from solid sheets of tissue within the body.

=== Disc structures ===
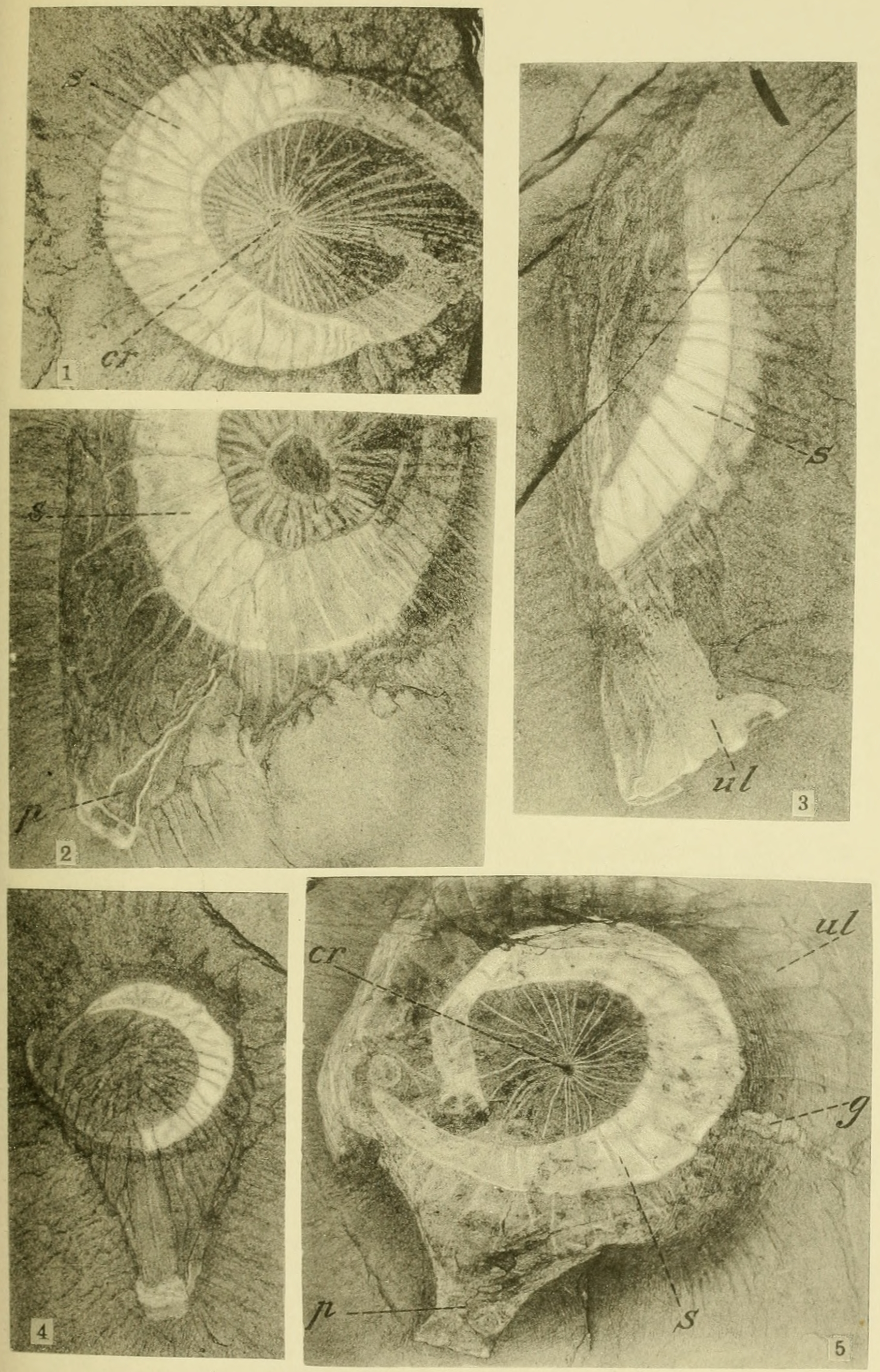
Fossils of Eldonia ludwigii, showing the prominent coiled sac, radial lobes, and central ring canal

The ventral disc acts as a platform for numerous elongated internal structures arranged in a radiating pattern. These narrow structures, known as "radial sacs" (also "radial lobes" or "internal lobes"), were most likely hollow cavities. They are among the most visible features in most fossils. The sacs are divided from each other by thin ligamentous walls, described as "septa" or "mesenteries". In most eldonioid species, each radial sac bifurcates (divides into two parts) near the rim of the disc. The radial sacs thin towards the center of the disc, but do not converge at a single point. Instead, they intersect with a small ring-shaped cavity or canal in the central part of the ventral disc. The radial sacs and ring cavity were likely filled with fluids, akin to a hydrostatic skeleton or (less likely) an echinoderm-like water vascular system.

The dorsal disc is usually more rigid and resistant to distortion than the ventral disc. In several taxa, the dorsal disk is ornamented by one or more irregular concentric (ring-shaped) wrinkles, which may be growth lines or artefacts of compression. According to some interpretations, radial ridges, wrinkles, or grooves also ornament part of the dorsal disc in some rotadiscids. Paropsonemids have even more complex dorsal discs, combining radial and concentric ornamentation at a fine level of detail. In Eldonia and Stellostomites, the dorsal disc appears to bear radial internal structures, mimicking the radial sacs above the ventral disc. The dorsal disc has been interpreted as almost completely solid, with the radiating structures identified as very thin tubular canals. This is opposite to what is seen in the ventral disc, which has proportionally larger radiating cavities and slender solid septa.

=== Body cavity ===
In most eldonioids, the center of the body is solid, but in other species, there is a rigid central cavity which tapers towards the ventral or dorsal disc. All eldonioids bear a thick, easily-recognizable coiled sac which rings around the middle of the body. The coiled sac is a horseshoe-shaped cavity that curves dextrally (clockwise) from the mouth to the anus. It sheaths the alimentary canal (gut), which is thinner and more difficult to discern in most fossils. In the best-preserved eldonioids, the gut can be divided into three regions: the esophagus or pharynx (front), stomach (middle), and intestine (rear). The stomach is usually the broadest part of the gut, and the portion of the coiled sac surrounding it is stained a dark color. The mouth and anus are positioned close to each other and open through the ventral disc.

=== Feeding tentacles ===
A small number of circumoral feeding tentacles project out from near the mouth. Their basic form is shrub-shaped, with a pair of main shafts that split away from each other and divide further into smaller filaments. Some authors referred to the circumoral tentacles as a "lophophore", a term used for the hollow filamentous tentacles of lophophorates such as brachiopods and bryozoans. In Rotadiscus, a pair of tightly coiled spiral structures connect to the base of the tentacles. These structures covered a hole called the coelomopore, seen in living ambulacrarians. Rotadiscus helps to establish homology between the coelomopore and additional pharyngeal openings present in tunicates and cephalochordates, as well as part of the vertebrate pituitary gland. Moreover, it suggests that the tentacles develop from outgrowths of the coelom (body cavity), more akin to ambulacrarians rather than lophophorates. Further similarities include detachment of the tentacles from the mouth, and their tapering structure.

== Classification ==
Eldonioids (or eldonids) have a frequently fluctuating species composition and their relationship to other animals has been controversial. Some authors argued that they represented early holothurians (sea cucumbers), while others stressed their similarity to lophophorates (a subset of lophotrochozoans with ciliated tentacles known as lophophores). In 2010, eldonioids were allied with two other unusual Cambrian genera: Herpetogaster and Phlogites. Together, they comprise the cambroernids, an informal clade. Cambroernids are probably deuterostomes, specifically stem- or crown-group ambulacrarians related to echinoderms and hemichordates.

Eldoniidae is a family first established in reference to Eldonia, a disc-shaped fossil named in 1911. Eldonia was one of many mysterious soft-bodied animals discovered in the Cambrian-age Burgess Shale of Canada. Eldonia was initially mistaken for a scyphozoan (jellyfish), and was not the only member of the group originally misidentified as a cnidarian. Others include Velumbrella (mistaken for a jellyfish), Discophyllum (mistaken for a coral), and Paropsonema (mistaken for a jellyfish-like porpitoid hydrozoan).

Eldonioids, a broader definition than eldoniids, also include rotadiscids and paropsonimeids Apart from Eldonia, the most abundant and well-preserved eldonioid species are from the Cambrian of China: Stellostomites eumorphus and Rotadiscus grandis are from the Chengjiang biota of Yunnan, and Pararotadiscus guizhouensis is from the Kaili Formation of Guizhou. Beyond the Cambrian, Discophyllum peltatum (formerly known as "Eldonia berbera") is an abundant fossil in the Late Ordovician Tafilalt biota of Morocco.

Dzik (1991) named the class Eldonioidea to encompass "velumbrellids" (i.e. eldoniids and rotadiscids) as the order Vellumbrellida and the goblet-shaped Cambrian animal Dinomischus as the order Dinomischida. The Vellumbrellida were divided into the families Eldoniidae and Rotadiscidae. Most subsequent authors doubt a close relationship between Dinomischus and velumbrellids, leaving Eldonioidea equivalent to Vellumbrellida. A 2018 assessment of Eldonioidea recognized the families Eldoniidae and Rotadiscidae alongside the informal group "paropsonemids."

A 2026 overview of Moroccan eldonioid fossils proposed an order Eldonida directly under the cambroernids to replace Eldonioidea and Velumbrellida. This replacement was proposed to address inconsistent use of phylogenetic and functional aspects of the organisms in the classification, as well as problems arising from Eldonioidea, Velumbrellida, and Dinomischida being defined in terms of a transition from lophophorates to deuterostomes that has since been rejected.

=== Taxonomy ===
As of 2026, two taxonomies have been in recent use. As there has not yet been time for subsequent publications to ratify the 2026 proposal, it is unclear which will be utilized going forward.

One classification is illustrated with a table in Schroeder, Paterson and Brock (2018), and is primarily based on Dzik (1991). It does not address Pseudodiscophyllum or the not-formally-published Praeclarus but is otherwise comprehensive at the genus level:

- Class Eldonioidea Dzik 1991 (= Eldoniidae sensu lato in some publications)
  - Family Eldoniidae Walcott 1911 sensu stricto
    - Eldonia Walcott 1911 (=Yunnanomedusa Sun & Hou 1987)
    - Stellostomites Sun & Hou 1987 (?=Eldonia Walcott 1911)
  - Family Rotadiscidae Dzik 1991
    - Rotadiscus Sun & Hou 1987 (=Brzechowia Dzik 1991)
    - Pararotadiscus Zhao & Zhu 1994 (=Rotadiscus Sun & Hou 1987 pars)
    - ? Seputus MacGabhann & Murray 2010
    - ? Velumbrella Stasińska 1960
    - An unnamed Pararotadiscus-like taxon from the early Cambrian Emu Bay Shale of Australia
  - "paropsonemids"
    - Discophyllum Hall 1847
    - Paropsonema Clarke 1900

The more recent classification is proposed by García-Bellido, Romero, and Gutiérrez-Marco (2026). This paper only mentions Rotadiscus as a cambroernid, but does not list it, nor its synonym Brzechowia, nor the family Rotadiscidae among the Eldonida. All other rotadiscids are left unassigned at the family level. The family Eldoniidae, the contents of which are not listed, is presumed to include only Eldonia as all other known genera are accounted for in the description of the order Eldonida:

- Order Eldonida García-Bellido, Romero & Gutiérrez-Marco 2026 pro MacGabhann 2012 (=Velumbrellida Dzik 1991 pars)
  - Pararotadiscus Zhao & Zhu 1994
  - Velumbrella Stasińska 1960
  - Seputus MacGabhann & Murray 2010
  - Family Eldoniidae Walcott 1911
    - Eldonia Walcott 1911 (=Yunnanomedusa Sun & Hou 1987; =Stellostomites Sun & Hou 1987)
  - Family Paropsonemidae García-Bellido, Romero & Gutiérrez-Marco 2026 pro MacGabhann 2012
    - Paropsonema Clarke 1900
    - Discophyllum Hall 1847 (?=Pseudodiscophyllum Fryer & Stanley 2004)
    - "Praeclarus" nomen nudum, named in unpublished thesis MacGabhann 2012

== Occurrences ==
The following geostratigraphic ranges are known as of 2026:

- Early Cambrian
  - Eldonia eumorpha (= Stellostomites eumorphus; Yunnanomedusa elegans): Yunnan, China
  - Rotadiscus grandis: Yunnan, China
  - Rotadiscus sp (=Brzechowia sp): Poland
  - Velumbrella czarnocki: Poland
  - "Emu Bay Shale taxon": Kangaroo Island, Australia
- Middle Cambrian
  - Rotadiscus sp (=Brzechowia sp): Poland
  - Velumbrella czarnocki: Poland
  - Pararotadiscus guizhouensis (=Rotadiscus guizhouensis): Guizhou, China
  - Eldonia ludwigi (British Columbia, Canada; Utah, USA; Siberia, Russia)
- Ordovician
  - Seputus pomeroii: Ireland
  - Discophyllum peltatum (=E. berbera): New York, USA; Morocco
- Silurian
  - Pseudodiscophyllum windermerensis (?=Discophyllum peltatum): England
  - Paropsonema mirabile: Melbourne, Australia
- Devonian
  - Paropsonema cryptophya: New York, USA
