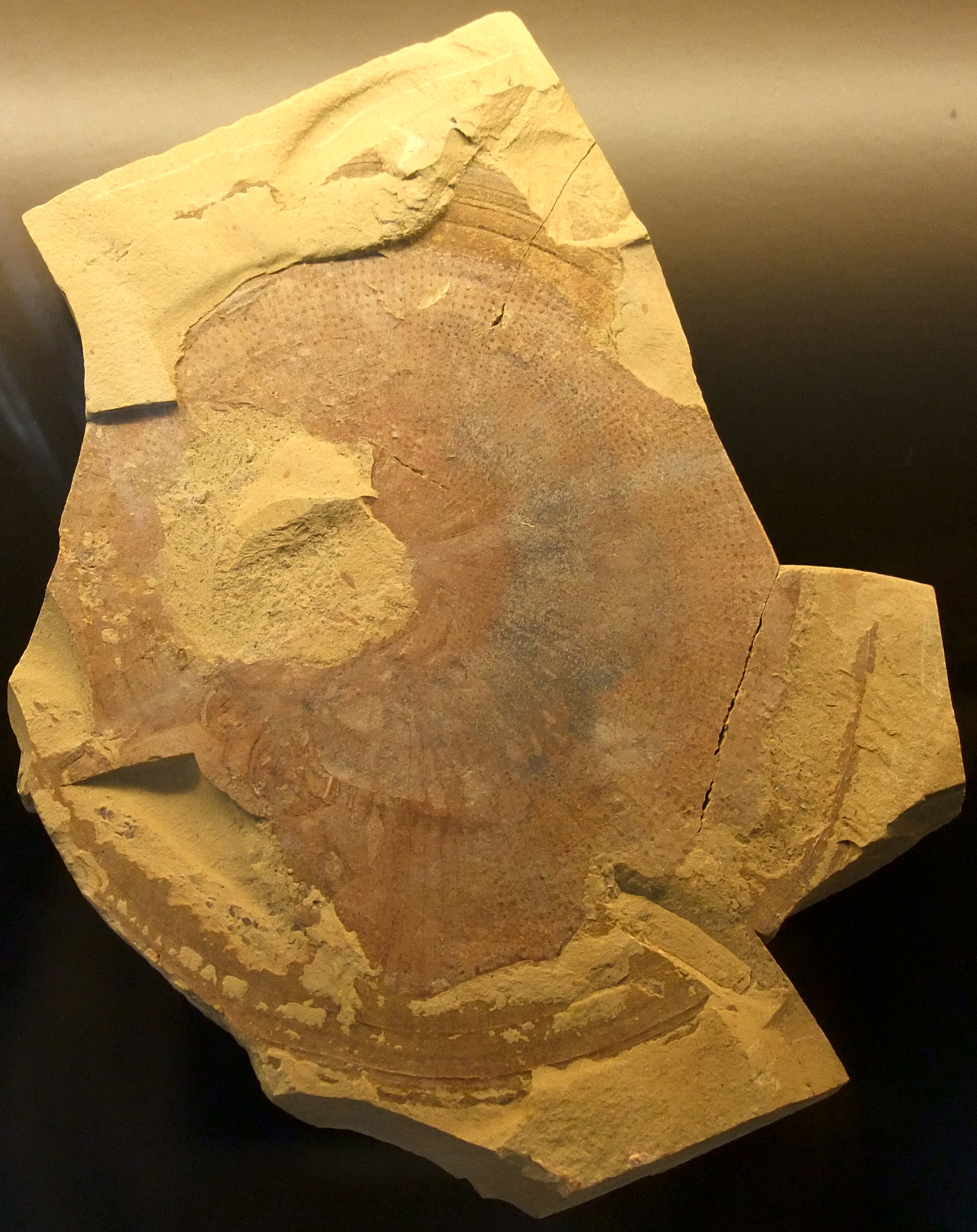
- Fossil of Rotadiscus

Scientific classification
- Kingdom: Animalia
- Stem group: Ambulacraria
- Clade: †Cambroernida
- Class: †Eldonioidea
- Family: †Rotadiscidae
- Genus: †Rotadiscus; Sun & Hou, 1987

Type species
- R. grandis Sun & Hou, 1987

Synonyms
- Brzechowia Dzik, 1991

= Rotadiscus =

Rotadiscus Temporal range: Early Cambrian – Middle Cambrian

Extinct genus of disc-shaped animal

Rotadiscus is a genus of discoidal animal known from the Cambrian Chengjiang biota and classified with the eldonioids.

As with other eldonioids, it was originally thought to have been pelagic, but is now thought to be benthic.

In addition to the type species R. grandis, two other Rotadiscus species have been proposed. The first is known only from one complete juvenile specimen and a few fragments, and was originally described as "Brzechowia sp." It remains without a formal species name, but has been transferred to Rotadiscus. The species initially described as R. guizhouensis has since been reassigned to the genus Pararotadiscus.

A 2023 cladistic analysis based on new fossils places Rotadiscus, along with other eldonioids, as stem-group ambulacrarians in the clade Cambroernida.
