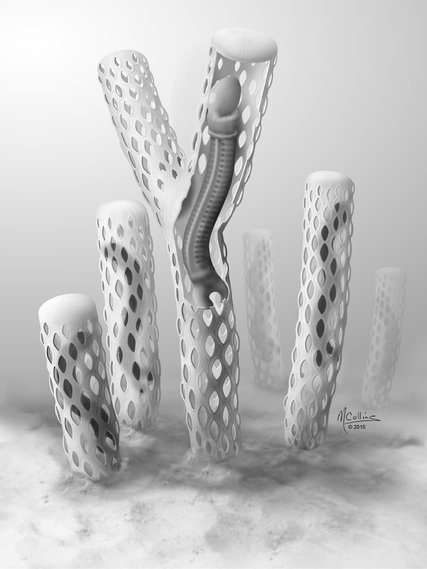
- Reconstruction of Oesia living in organic tube Margaretia

Scientific classification
- Kingdom: Animalia
- Phylum: Hemichordata
- Genus: †Oesia; Walcott, 1911
- Species: †O. disjuncta

Binomial name
- †Oesia disjuncta Walcott, 1911

= Oesia =

Oesia Temporal range: Middle Cambrian

Animal genus from the Burgess Shale

Oesia is a genus of hemichordate known from the Middle Cambrian Burgess Shale. It is monospecific, containing only the species Oesia disjuncta. 1147 specimens of Oesia are known from the Greater Phyllopod bed, where they comprise 2.18% of the community. It was previously compared to the chaetognaths, annelids and tunicates.
