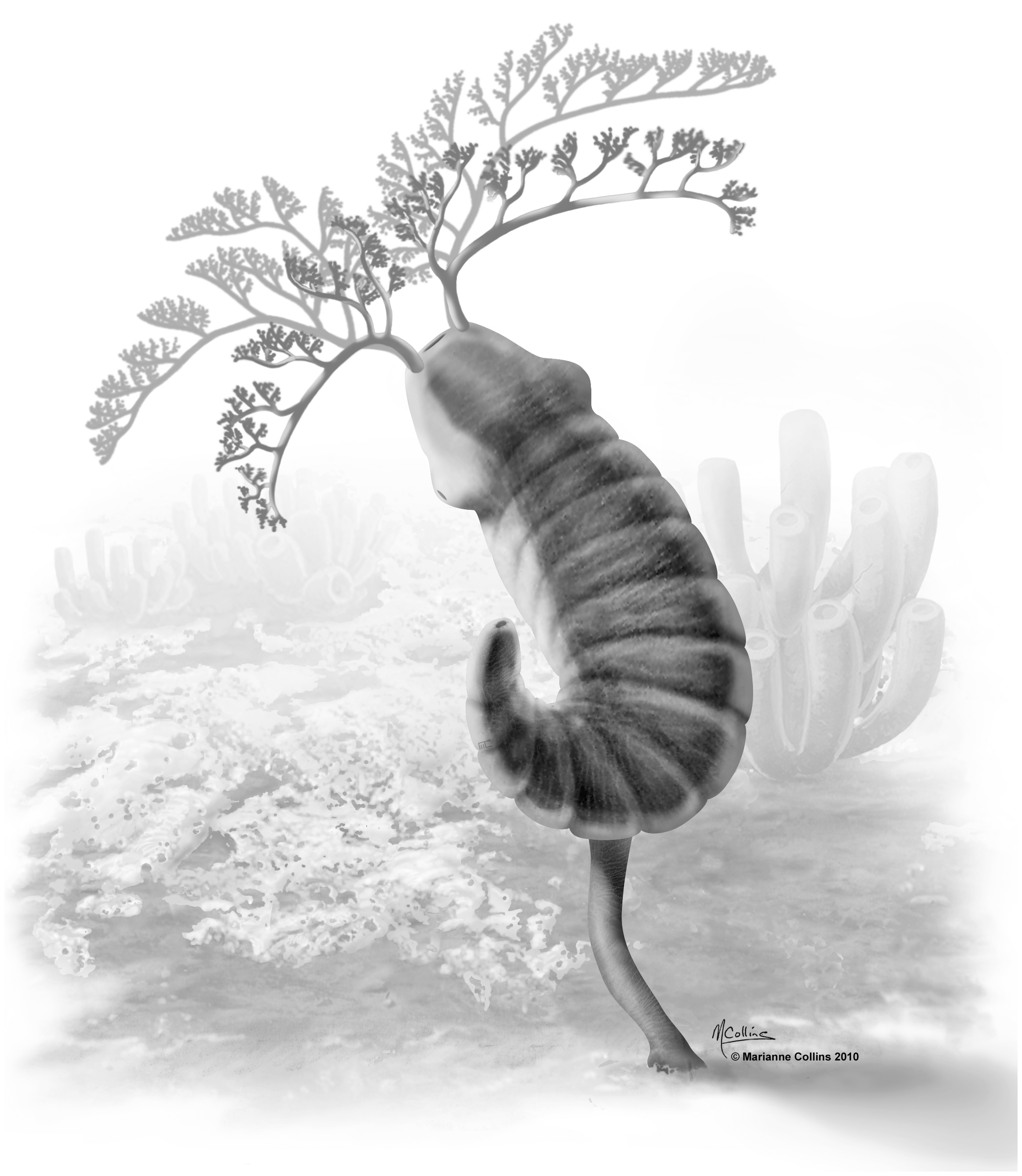
- Herpetogaster
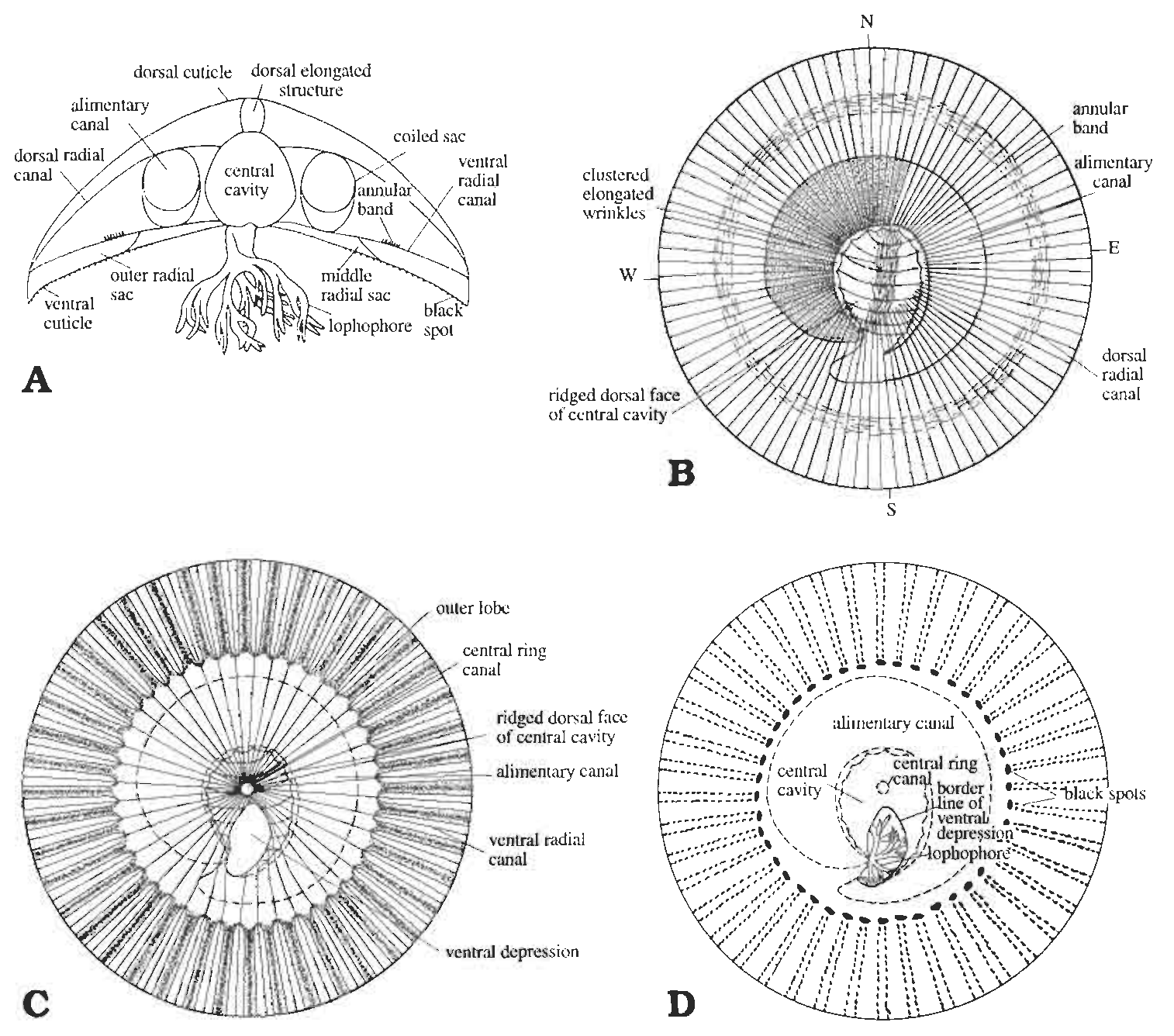
- Eldonia

Scientific classification
- Kingdom: Animalia
- Stem group: Ambulacraria
- Clade: †Cambroernida; Caron, Conway Morris, & Shu, 2010

Subdivisions
- Herpetogaster; Phlogites; Eldonioidea

Synonyms
- Dendrobrachia Hou et al. 2006

= Cambroernid =

Cambroernids Temporal range: Cambrian–Devonian

Extinct clade of animals

The Cambroernida are a clade of Paleozoic animals with coiled bodies and filamentous tentacles. They include a number of early to middle Paleozoic (Cambrian to Devonian) genera noted as "bizarre" or "orphan" taxa, meaning that their affinities with other animals, living or extinct, have long been uncertain. While initially defined as an "informal stem group," later work with better-preserved fossils has strengthened the argument for Cambroernida as a clade.

== Description ==
Cambroernids encompass three particular types of enigmatic animals first appearing in the Cambrian: Herpetogaster (the type genus), Phlogites, and the Eldonioidea. They are united by a set of common features including at least one pair of bifurcated or divided oral tentacles, and a large stomach and narrower intestine enclosed together in a clockwise-coiled sac.

== Taxonomy and evolution ==
From left: Herpetogaster collinsi, Phlogites longus, Eldonia ludwigi
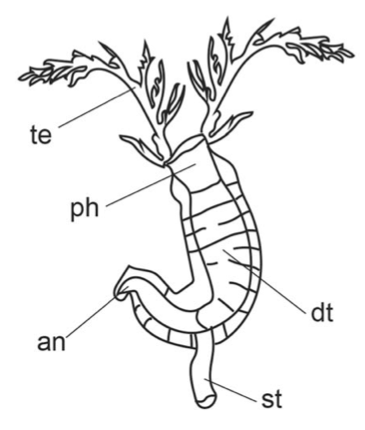
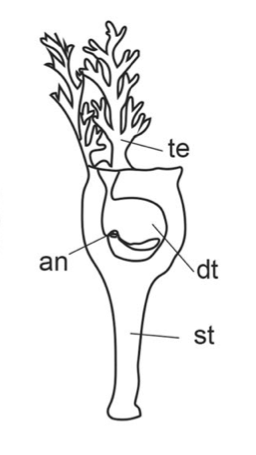
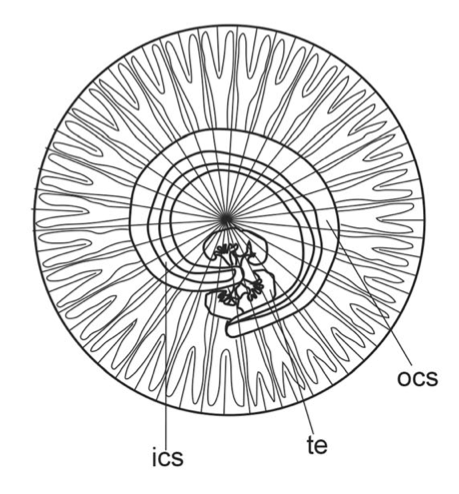
te: tentacles, ph: pharynx, dt: digestive tract, ics: inner coiled sac, ocs: outer coiled sac, an: anus, st: stolon

Body coiling increased throughout this group's evolution. Herpetogaster has a segmented and clockwise-curved body attached to the substrate via a narrow and partially mobile stolon (stalk). Phlogites was even more simple, with a thick immobile stolon leading up to a tentacle-bearing calyx (cup-shaped main body), with internal gut coiling. The eldoniids (also known as eldonioids or eldonids) were diverse and disc-shaped, commonly described as "medusiform", i.e. jellyfish-shaped. Though the lifestyle of eldoniids is still debated, it can be agreed that they had a large curved stomach and no stolon.

The lack of a post-anal tail in cambroernids suggests that, contrary to long-held assumptions, this feature was not present in the common ancestor of deuterostomes. This is congruent with the significant differences between the post-anal tails of chordates and hemichordates. This and other features of cambroernids suggest that post-anal tails, gill bars, and a U-shaped gut evolved multiple times in the deuterostomes through convergence.

Segmentation, as seen in Herpetogaster, is a notable characteristic of chordates not seen in other ambulacrarians, indicating that it might be a trait of ancestral deuterostomes.

While Phlogites was at one point assigned to a newly proposed phylum, Dendrobrachia, this was discarded for the larger group in favor of cladistic approach to stem groups as ICZN precedence rules do not apply to phyla. A further explanation given was that defining a new phylum was seen as "essentialist" and serving to "place problematic taxa in phylogenetic limbo."

=== Phylogeny ===
Phylogenetic analysis offers strong support for Cambroernida as a clade of stem-group ambulacrarians. The following cladogram is simplified from Li et al. 2023; only a sampling of eldonioids were included in the analysis:

- Ambulacraria (total group)
  - Cambroernida
    - Herpetogaster
    - - Phlogites
      - - Rotadiscus
        - - Eldonia eumorpha
          - Eldonia ludwigi
          - Pararotadiscus
  - Ambulacraria (crown group)
    - Hemichordata
    - Echinodermata

=== Internal classification ===
Genera whose family placement is tentative are preceded with (?).

- Herpetogaster
- Phlogites
- Class Eldonioidea
  - Family Eldoniidae
    - Eldonia (=Stellostomites; =Yunnanomedusa)
  - Family Rotadiscidae
    - Rotadiscus (=Brzechowia)
    - Pararotadiscus
    - (?) Velumbrella
    - (?) Seputus
  - "Paropsonemids" (informal group)
    - Paropsonema
    - Discophyllum

Note that some authors continue to treat Stellostomites as a separate taxon.

=== History of identification ===
Previously, some cambroernids were compared to members of the broad invertebrate clade Lophotrochozoa. In particular, they were allied with the lophophorates, a subset of lophotrochozoans bearing a crown of ciliated tentacles known as the lophophore. However, this interpretation has more recently been considered unlikely, insofar as cambroernids are interpreted as deuterostomes, whereas lophophorates are protostomes.
