= Spartobranchus =

Spartobranchus Temporal range: Upper Cambrian

Scientific classification
- Kingdom: Animalia
- Phylum: Hemichordata
- Class: Enteropneusta
- Genus: †Spartobranchus; Caron et al, 2013
- Species: †S. tenuis

Binomial name
- †Spartobranchus tenuis Caron et al, 2013

Extinct genus of acorn worm

Spartobranchus is an extinct genus of acorn worm from the Cambrian Burgess Shale. It contains the species Spartobranchus tenuis. It is similar to the modern representatives of the family Harrimaniidae, although distinguished by living in branching fibrous tubes. It is a likely stem-member of the acorn worms, although it is somewhat intermediate between them and pterobranchs. Studies show that the ability to create tubes were lost in the line leading to modern acorn worm, but remained in the pterobranchs. However, Antarctic torquaratorids have recently been found that also make tubes.

== Description ==
Detailed analysis shows that Spartobranchus tenuis had a flexible body consisting of a short proboscis, a collar and a narrow elongated body that ended in a bulbous structure that may have served as an anchor. The most complete specimens reached 10 cm (3.9 in) long, with a proboscis roughly half a centimeter in length.
