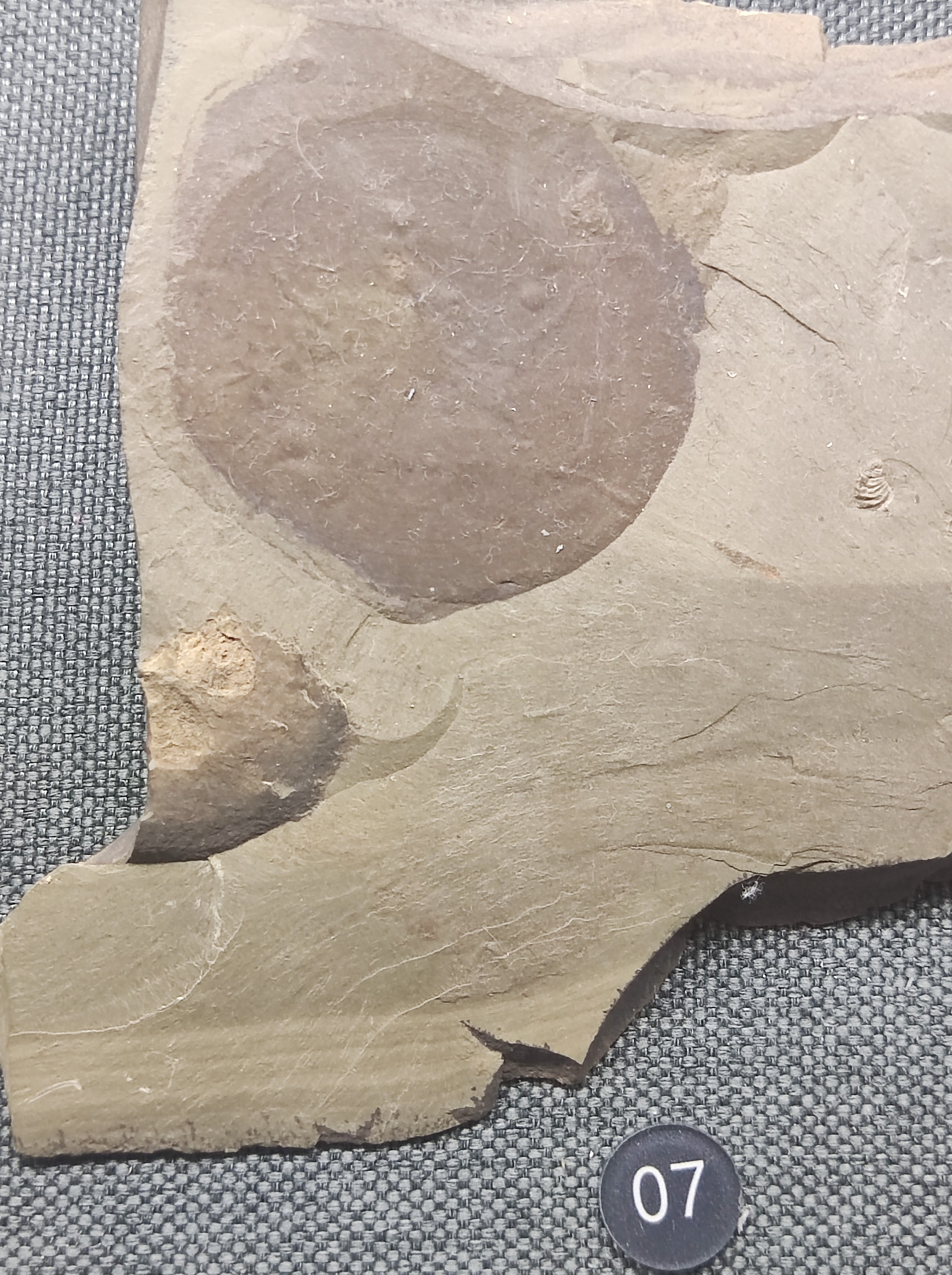

Scientific classification
- Kingdom: Animalia
- Stem group: Ambulacraria
- Clade: †Cambroernida
- Class: †Eldonioidea
- Family: †Rotadiscidae
- Genus: †Pararotadiscus; Zhao and Zhu, 1994

Species
- P. guizhouensis

= Pararotadiscus =

Pararotadiscus Temporal range: Wuliuan

Extinct genus of disc-shaped fossil

Pararotadiscus is an abundant Eldonioid fossil from the mid-Cambrian, and one of the most abundant taxa in the Kaili biota.
