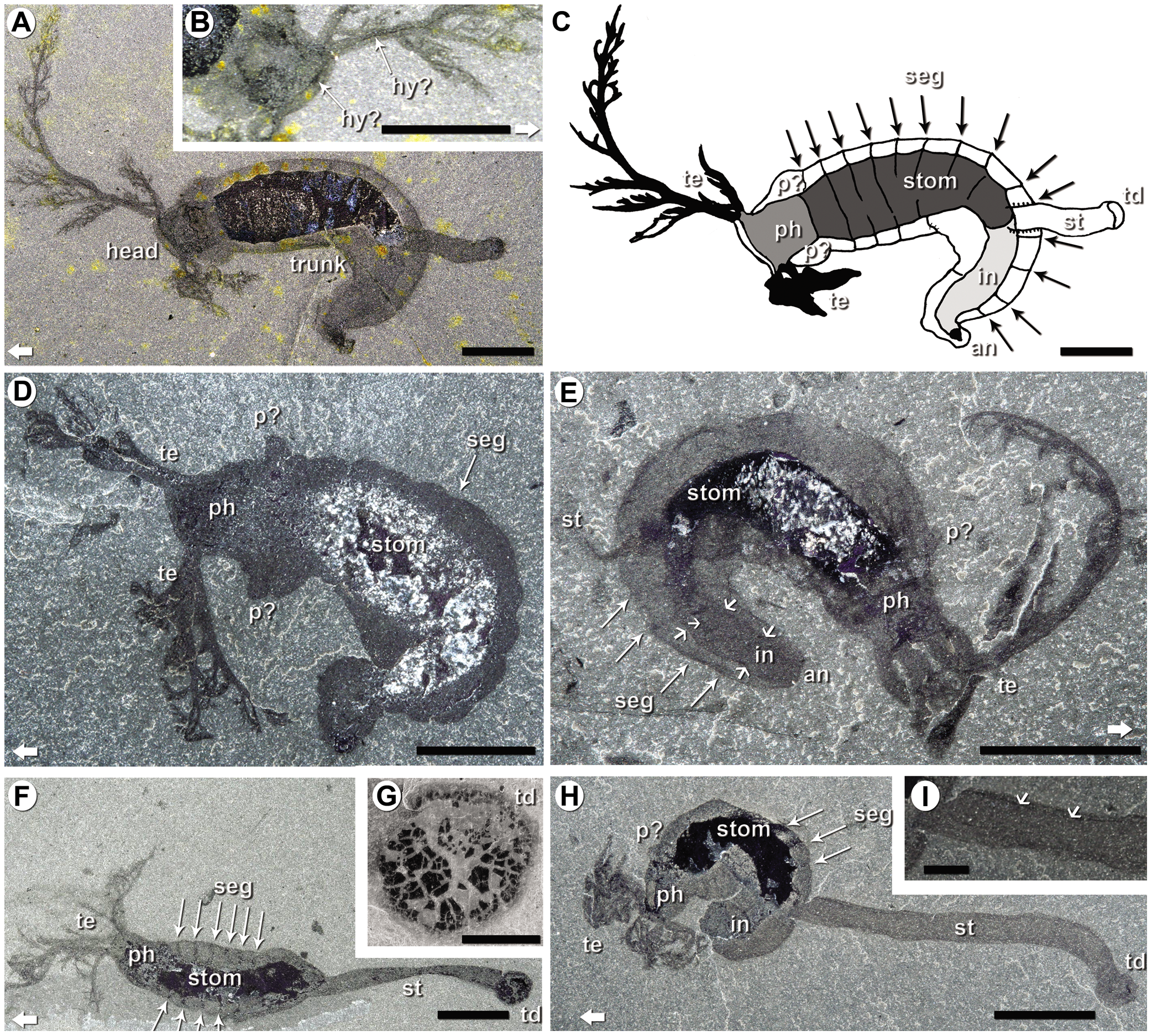
- Specimens and diagram

Scientific classification
- Kingdom: Animalia
- Superphylum: Deuterostomia
- Stem group: Ambulacraria
- Clade: †Cambroernida
- Genus: †Herpetogaster; Caron et al., 2010

Type species
- †H. collinsi Caron et al., 2010

Species
- †H. collinsi Caron et al., 2010; †H. haiyanensis Yang et al., 2020

= Herpetogaster =

Herpetogaster Temporal range: Early to mid Cambrian: Chengjiang–Burgess shale

Extinct genus of Cambrian animals

Herpetogaster is an extinct cambroernid genus of animal from the Early Cambrian Chengjiang biota of China, Balang Formation of China, Pioche Formation of Nevada and Middle Cambrian Burgess Shale of Canada containing the species Herpetogaster collinsi and Herpetogaster haiyanensis.

== Description ==
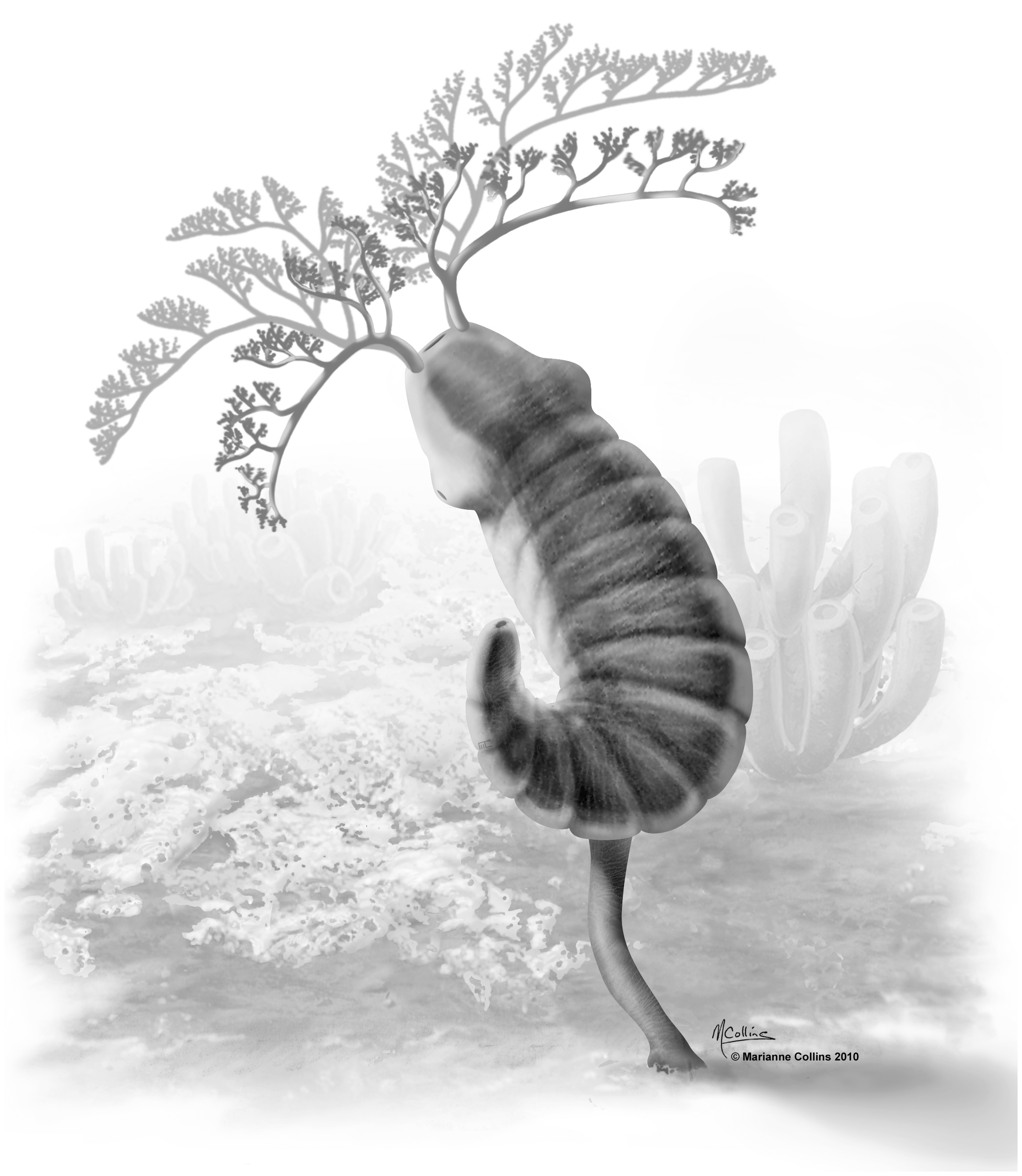
H. collinsi life restoration

H. collinsi is known from over 160 specimens. It possessed a pair of branching tentacles and a tough but flexible body that curved helically to the right like a ram's horn and was divided into at least 13 segments. A flexible, extensible stolon emerged from the body at about the ninth segment and secured the animal to the sea floor, often by attaching to the sponge Vauxia. It is not known whether the attachment was permanent.

A mouth opened between the tentacles, leading internally to a pharynx, a large lentil-shaped stomach, a narrower straight intestine, and an anus at the end of the "tail." The tentacles were softer than the body and probably extensible. A dark line running down the center of each tentacle and connecting with the head is tentatively reconstructed as a hydrostatic canal and/or vascular system; if this interpretation is correct, the tentacles might have been controlled by fluid pressure, and individuals could have fed by snaring either small prey or edible particles in the tentacles and bringing the tentacles to the mouth, as in living sea cucumbers. Structures on the back of the head have been noted as potential pharyngeal pores, which suggests a relationship with early echinoderms. The whole animal was 3-4 cm long. They were probably gregarious, as up to eight individuals have been found on the same slab. Six specimens of Herpetogaster are known from the Greater Phyllopod bed, where they comprise less than 0.01% of the community.

== See also ==
- Paleobiota of the Burgess Shale
