= Lace coral =

Lace coral may refer to:

- Bryozoa, a phylum of aquatic invertebrate animals whose colonies sometimes are referred to as lace corals
- Pocillopora damicornis, a species of stony coral commonly known as the lace coral or cauliflower coral
- Stylasteridae, a family of colonial hydrozoans also known as lace corals
