= Lepidotheca =

Scientific classification
- Domain: Eukaryota
- Kingdom: Animalia
- Phylum: Cnidaria
- Class: Hydrozoa
- Order: Anthoathecata
- Family: Stylasteridae
- Genus: Lepidotheca; Cairns, 1983

Genus of cnidarians

Lepidotheca is a genus of cnidarians belonging to the family Stylasteridae.

The species of this genus are found in Southern Hemisphere.

Species:

- Lepidotheca altispina Cairns, 1991
- Lepidotheca brochi Cairns, 1986
