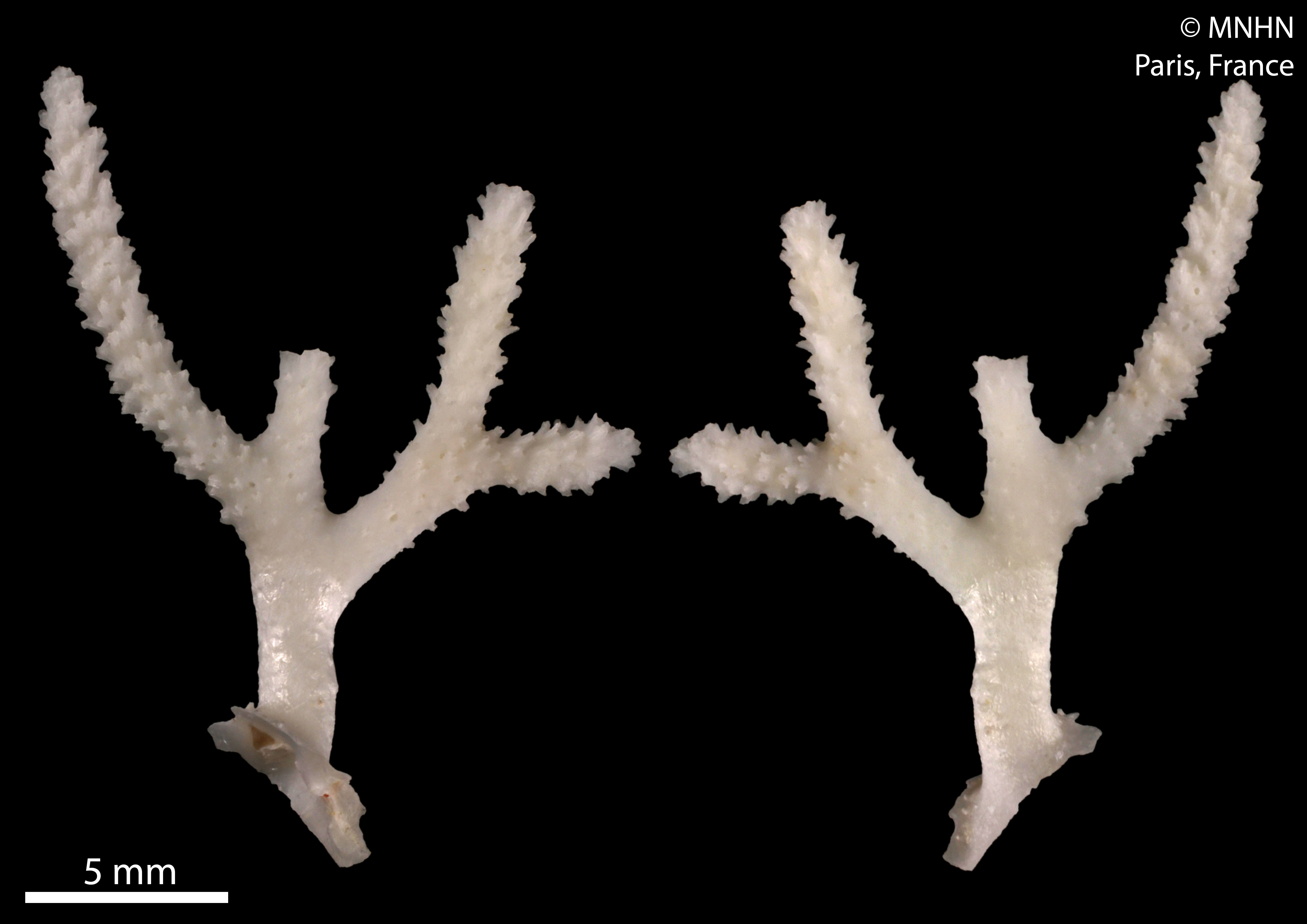
- Inferiolabiata rhabdion

Scientific classification
- Domain: Eukaryota
- Kingdom: Animalia
- Phylum: Cnidaria
- Class: Hydrozoa
- Order: Anthoathecata
- Family: Stylasteridae
- Genus: Inferiolabiata; Broch, 1951

= Inferiolabiata =

Genus of hydrozoans

Inferiolabiata is a genus of hydrozoans belonging to the family Stylasteridae.

The species of this genus are found in Southern Hemisphere.

Species:

- Inferiolabiata africana Cairns & Zibrowius, 2013
- Inferiolabiata cervicornis (Broch, 1942)
- Inferiolabiata cestospinula Cairns, 2015
- Inferiolabiata labiata (Moseley, 1879)
- Inferiolabiata limatula Cairns, 2015
- Inferiolabiata lowei (Cairns, 1983)
- Inferiolabiata rhabdion Cairns, 2015
- Inferiolabiata spinosa Cairns, 1991
