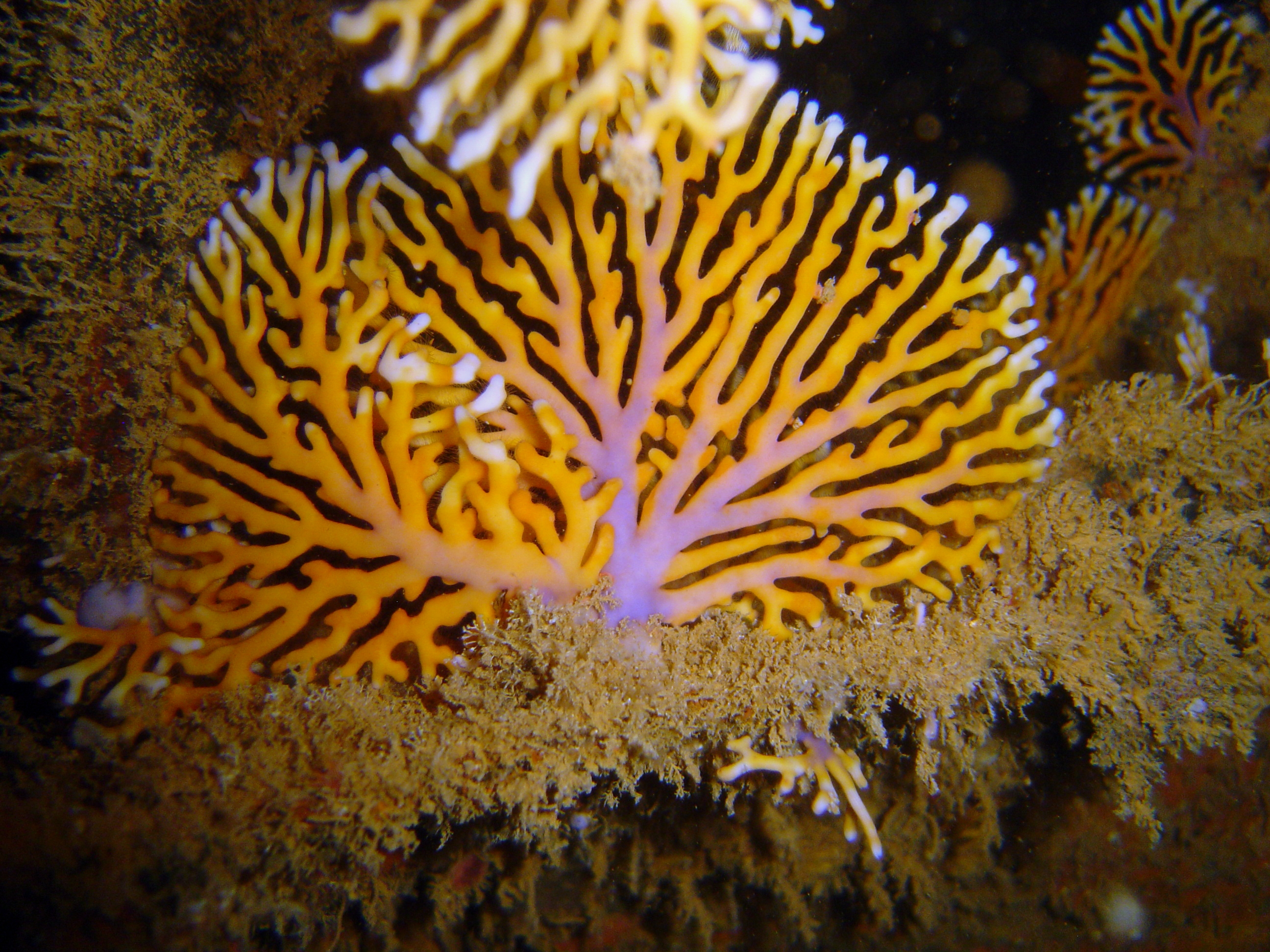
- Lace coral (Distichopora sp.)

Scientific classification
- Kingdom: Animalia
- Phylum: Cnidaria
- Class: Hydrozoa
- Order: Anthoathecata
- Family: Stylasteridae
- Genus: Distichopora; Lamarck, 1816

= Distichopora =

Genus of hydrozoans

Distichopora is a genus of hydrozoans belonging to the family Stylasteridae.

The species of this genus are found in the Pacific Ocean, Indian Ocean, and Central Atlantic Ocean.

== Species ==
Species:

- Distichopora anceps Cairns, 1978
- Distichopora anomala Cairns, 1986
- Distichopora antigua deFrance, 1826
