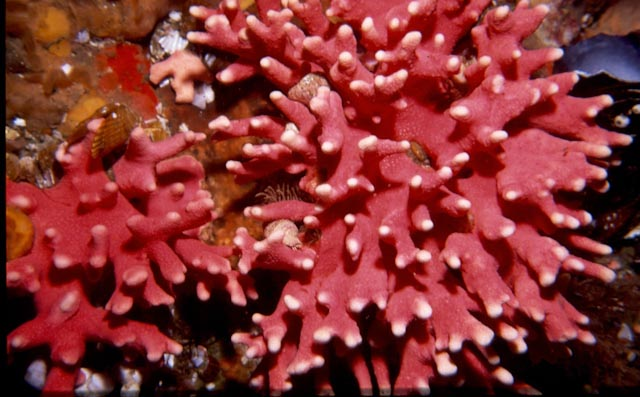

Scientific classification
- Kingdom: Animalia
- Phylum: Cnidaria
- Class: Hydrozoa
- Order: Anthoathecata
- Family: Stylasteridae
- Genus: Stylaster
- Species: S. nobilis

Binomial name
- Stylaster nobilis Stechow, 1921

= Stylaster nobilis =

Species of hydrozoan

Stylaster nobilis, the noble coral, is a branching colonial hydroid in the family Stylasteridae.

== Description ==
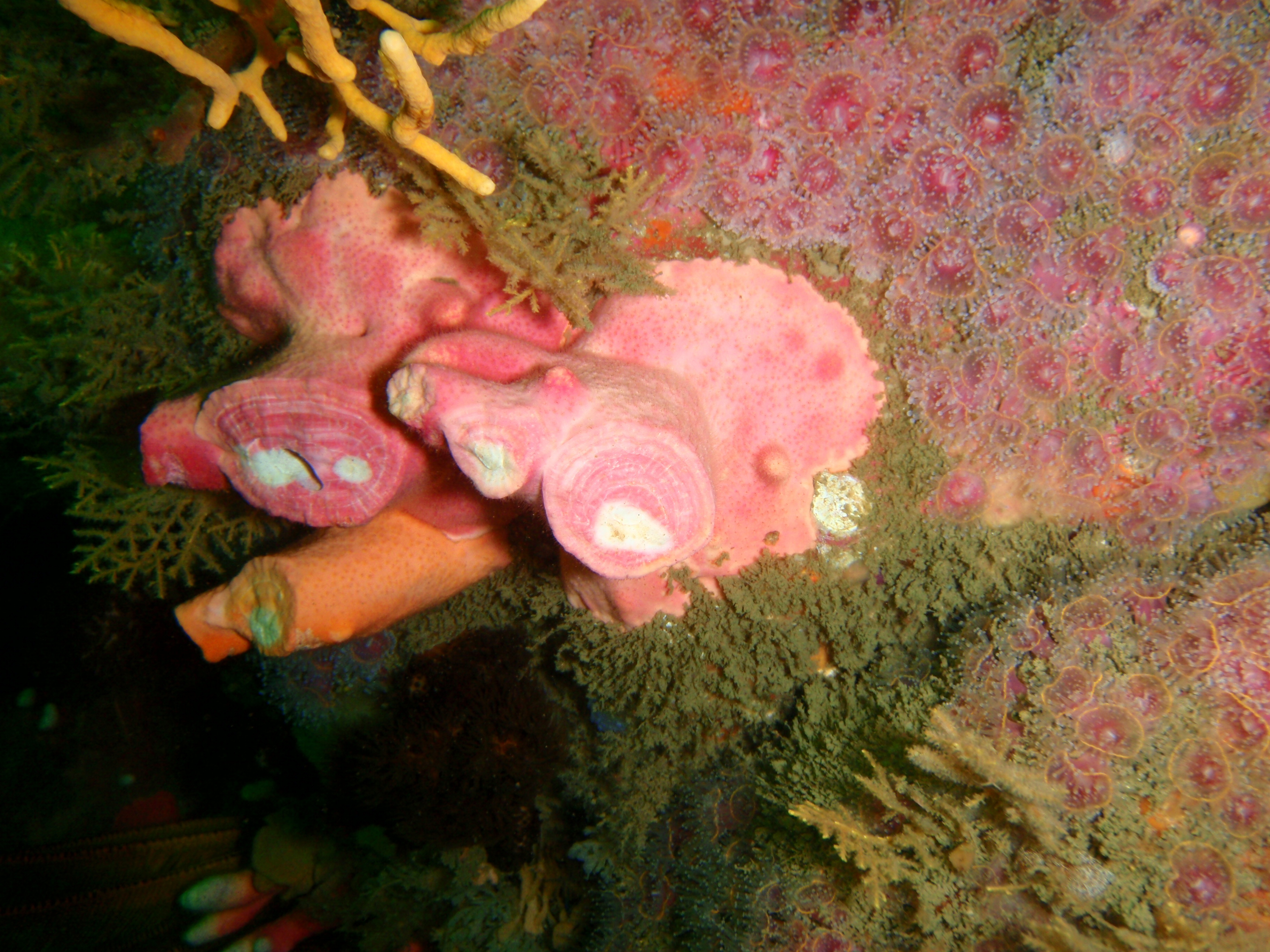
Growth rings are visible in this broken specimen. The white core is the original growth

Noble corals are pink or orange and tree-like with paler tips to the colony's branches. The calcareous colonies may grow to over 25 cm in total height, while individual polyps are 0.1 cm in diameter. There is no free medusa stage.

The polyps project from star-shaped cavities in the rigid calcareous skeleton. Growth occurs at the tips and on the outside surface, which gradually thickens and which may show concentric rings in section.

=== Colour and shape variation ===
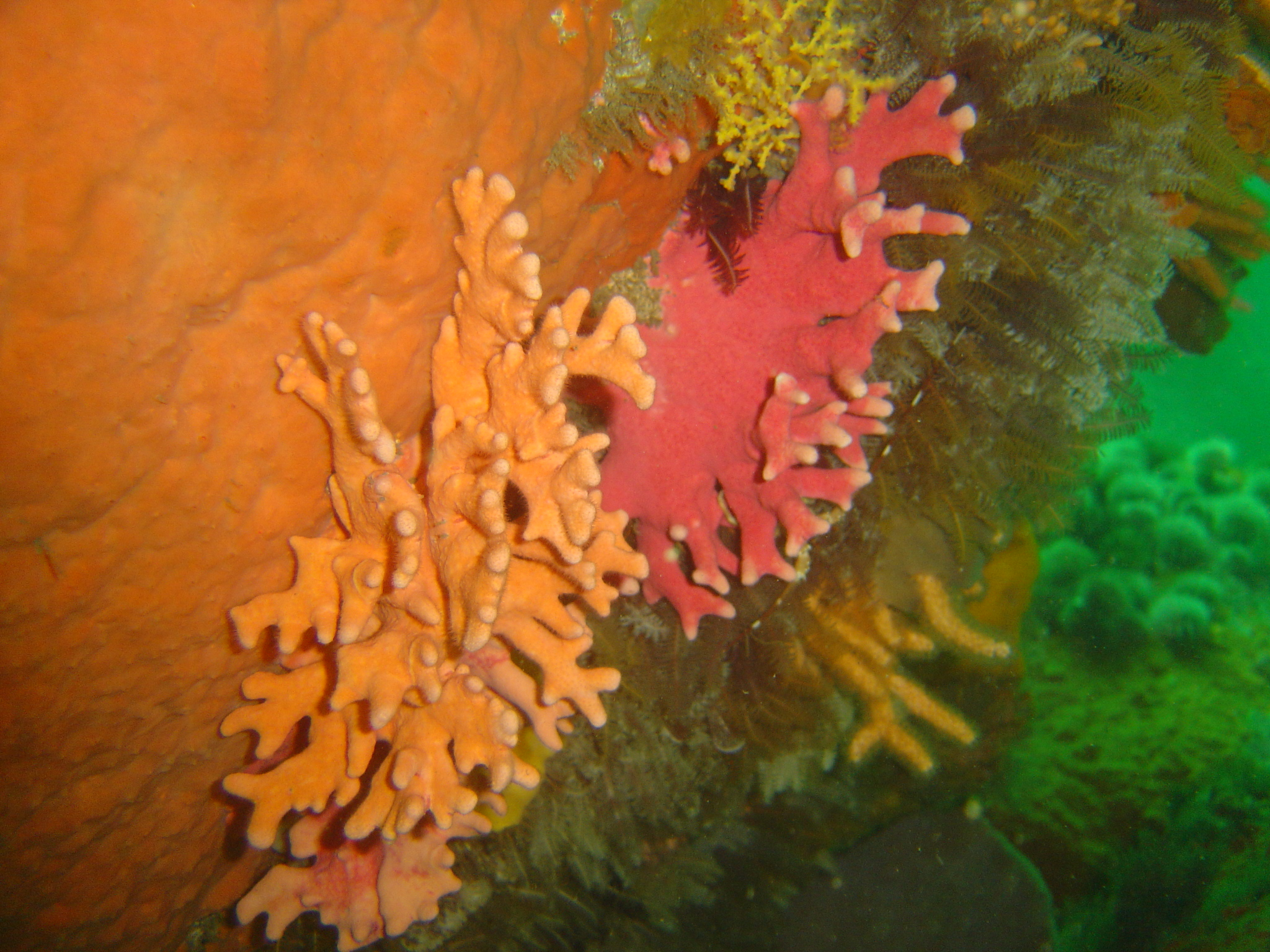
Two colour morphs at Oudekraal, on the Cape Peninsula

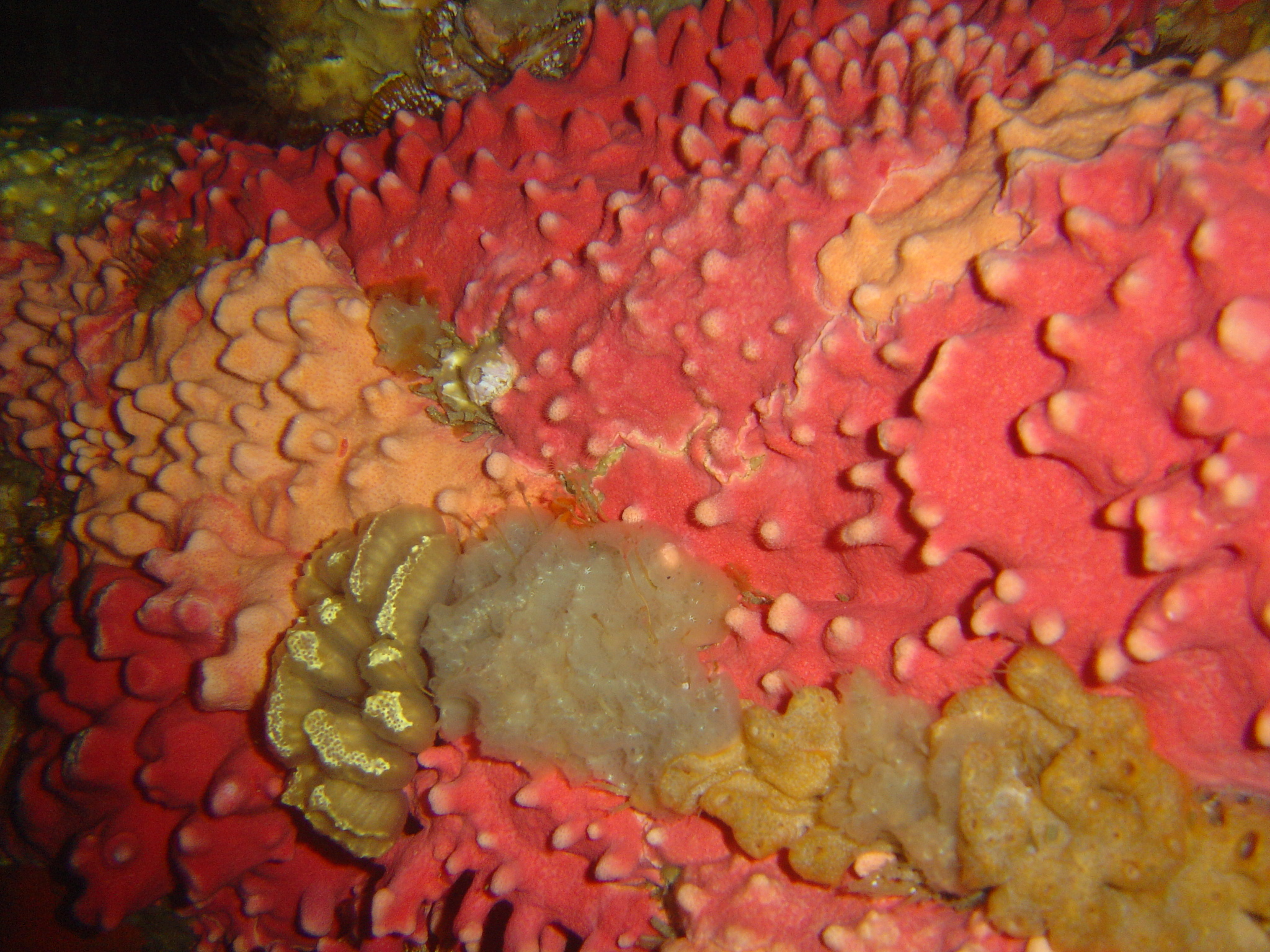
Occasionally S. nobilis will develop a more encrusting structure

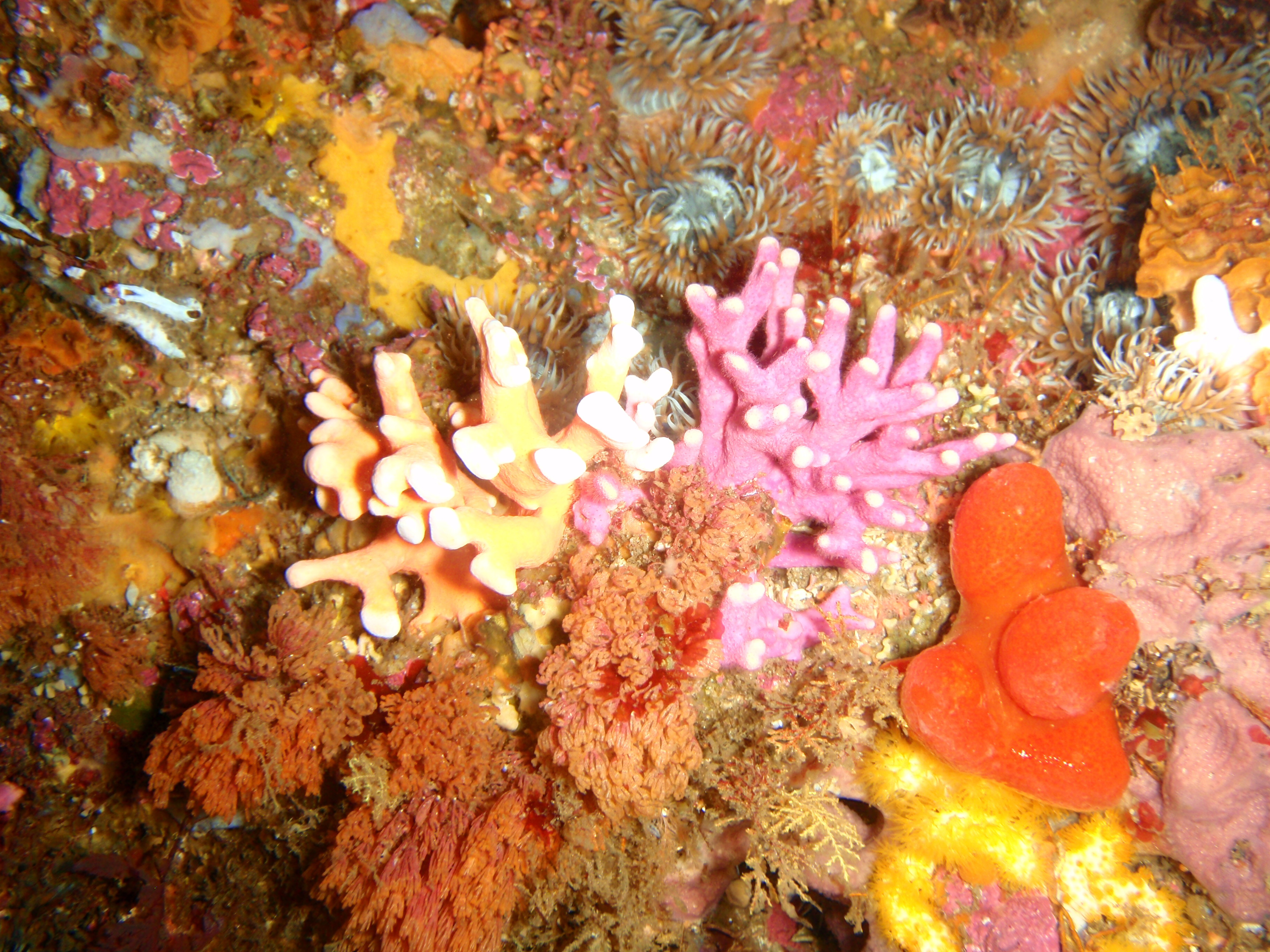
Specimens from about 35m depth in the Tsitsikamma Marine Protected Area

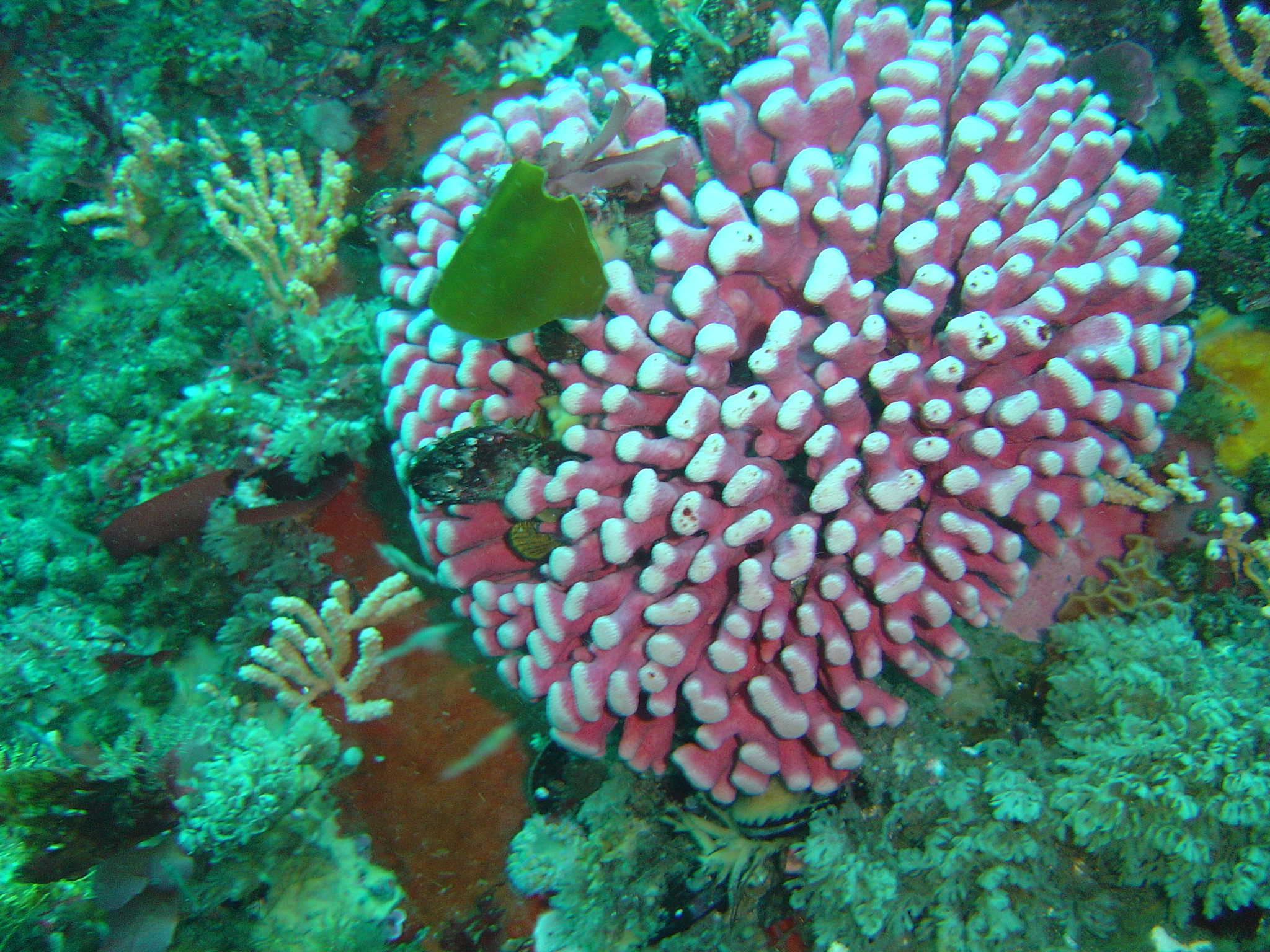
A densely packed structure is also possible

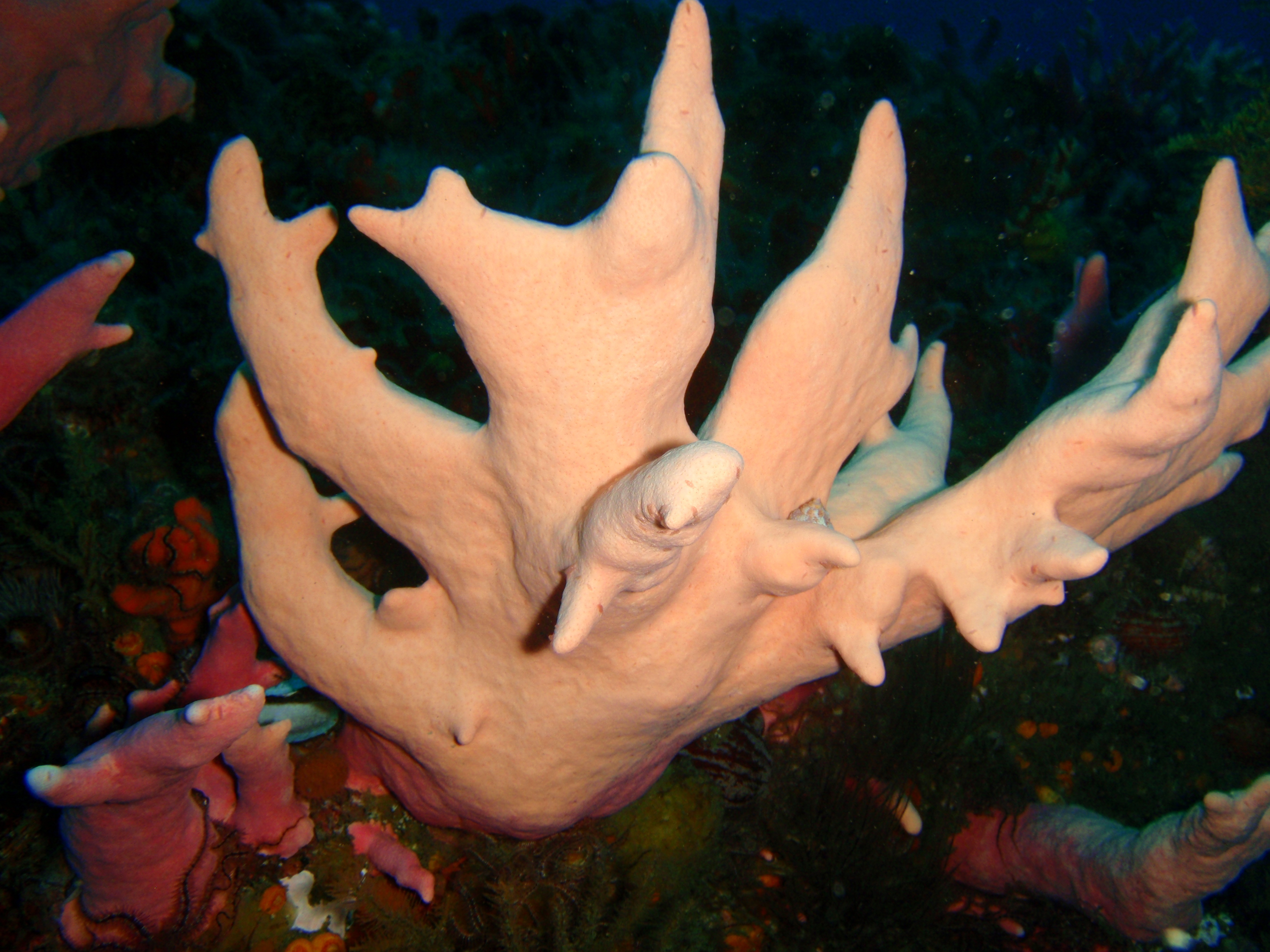
A stocky morph can be found in a few places

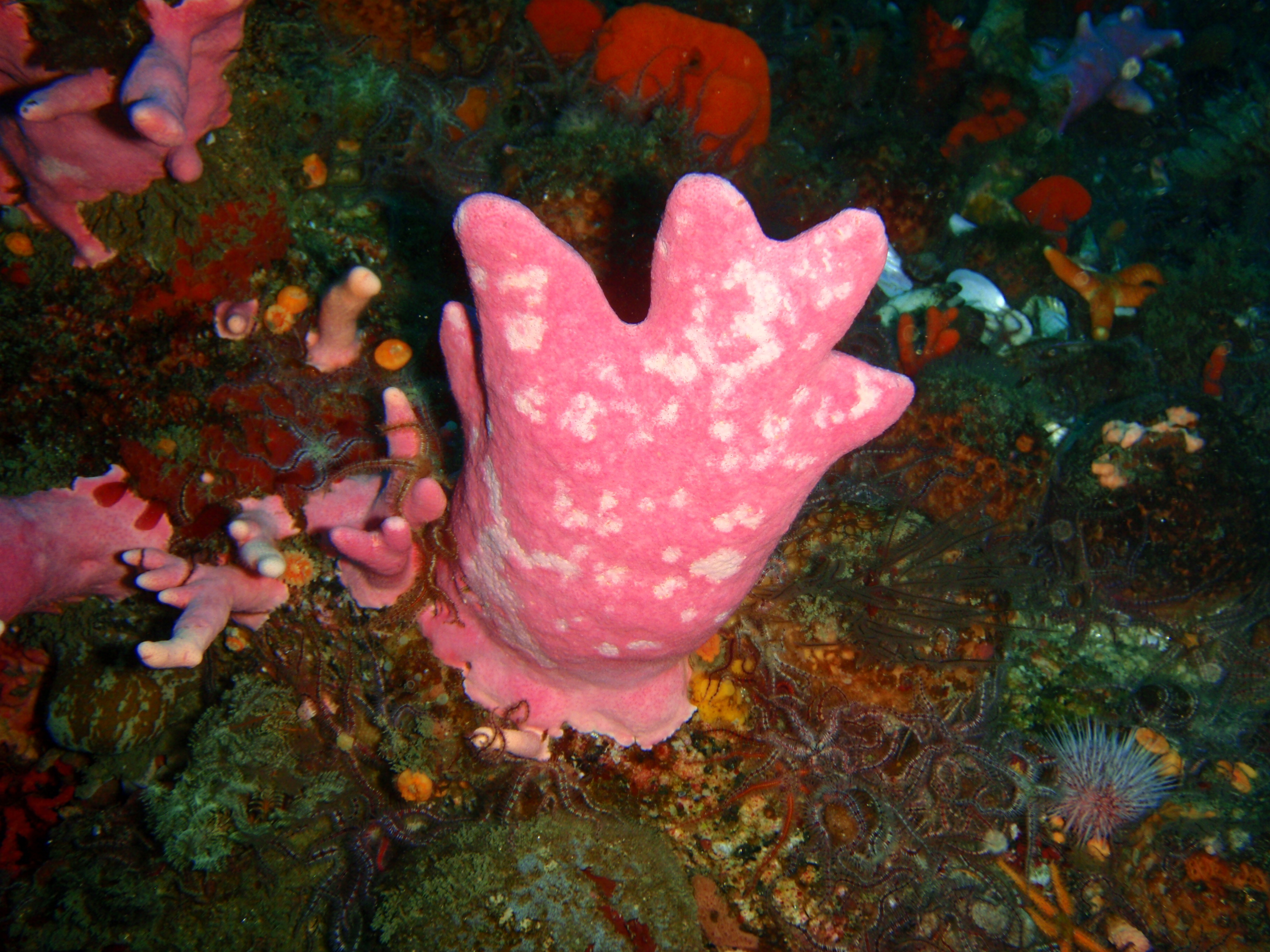
The colouration may occasionally be mottled

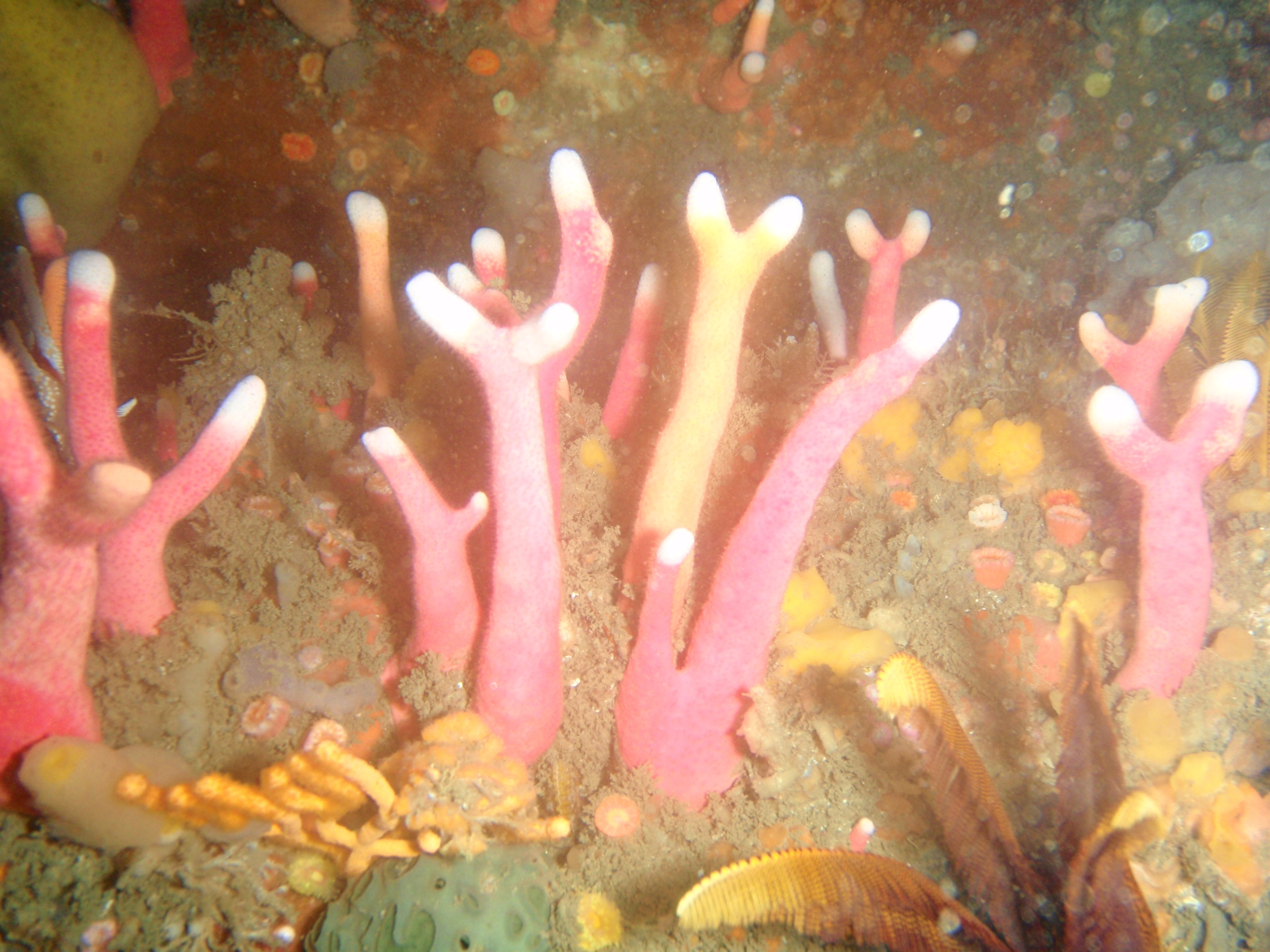
In some areas there is significantly less branching

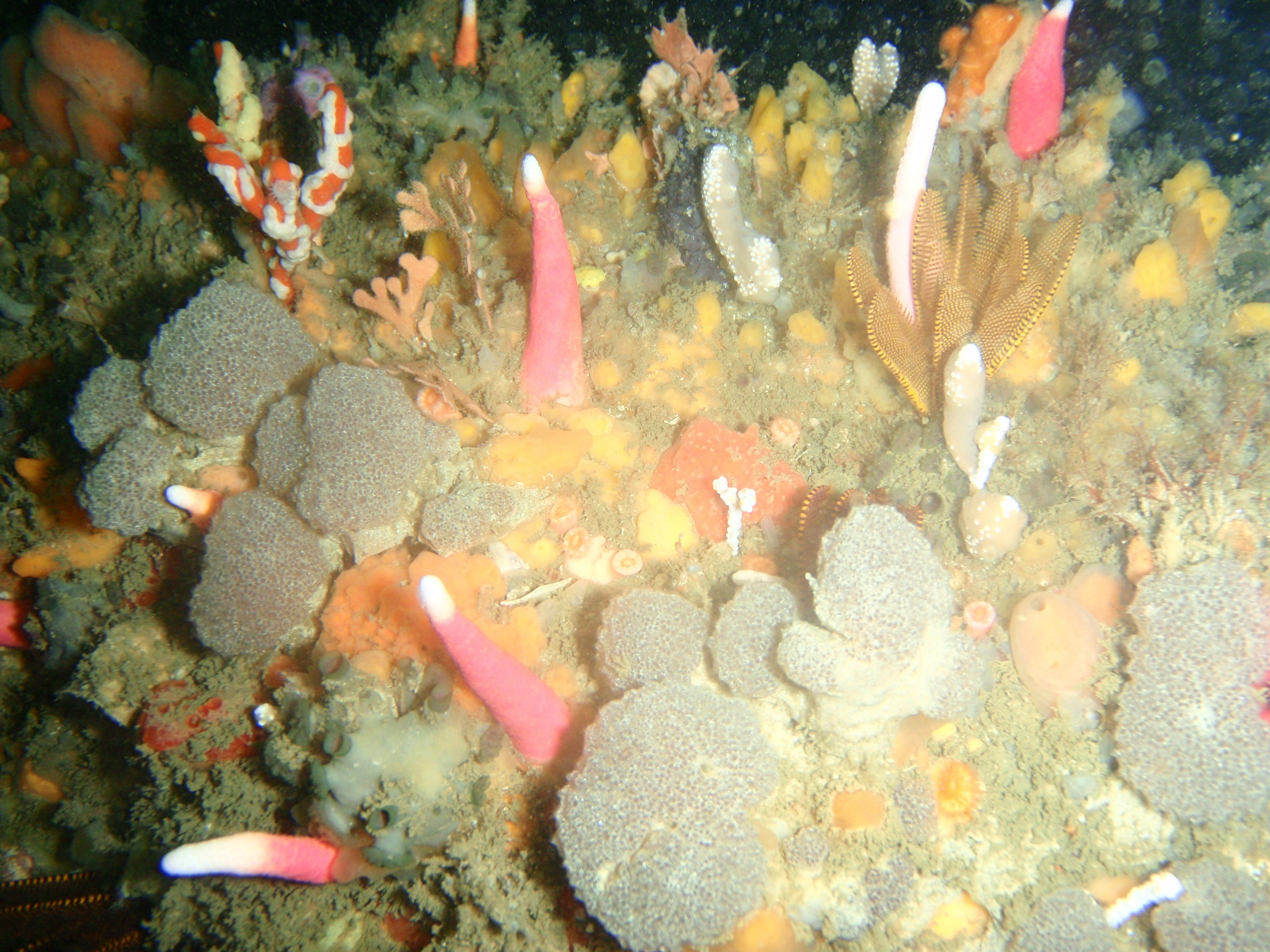
In some cases there may be no branching at all

== Distribution ==
This colonial animal is found only off the South African coast from the Atlantic Coast of the Cape Peninsula to Port Elizabeth in 5-100m of water. It is endemic to this region.

== Ecology ==
Noble corals feed on plankton and resemble hard corals. They occur in cool temperate waters usually in caves and under overhangs. They are very slow-growing: large colonies may be over 100 years old. A permit is required to collect these animals.

== Synonyms ==
The following species are considered synonyms of Stylaster nobilis:

- Allopora explanata Kent, 1871
- Allopora nobilis Kent, 1871
- Allopora ochracea Qulech, 1884
