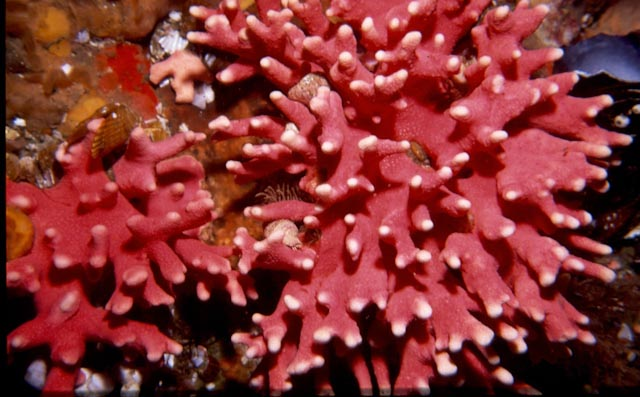
- Stylaster nobilis

Scientific classification
- Kingdom: Animalia
- Phylum: Cnidaria
- Class: Hydrozoa
- Order: Anthoathecata
- Family: Stylasteridae
- Genus: Stylaster; Gray, 1831

Species
- See text

Synonyms
- Allopora Ehrenberg, 1834; Cryptaxiella Kuhn, 1939; Cryptaxis; Cyclopora Verrill, 1866; Dendracis; Deontopora

= Stylaster =

Genus of hydrozoans

Stylaster is a genus of hydroids in the family Stylasteridae.

== Species ==
The following species are classed in this genus:

- Stylaster alaskanus Fisher, 1938
- Stylaster amphiheloides Kent, 1871
- Stylaster antillarum Zibrowius & Cairns, 1982
- †Stylaster antiquus Sismondi, 1871
- Stylaster asper Kent, 1871
- Stylaster atlanticus Broch, 1936
- Stylaster aurantiacus Cairns, 1986
- Stylaster bellus (Dana, 1848)
- Stylaster bilobatus Hickson & England, 1909
- Stylaster bithalamus Broch, 1936
- Stylaster blatteus (Boschma, 1961)
- Stylaster bocki Broch, 1936
- Stylaster boreopacificus Broch, 1932
- Stylaster boschmai (Eguchi, 1965)
- Stylaster brochi (Fisher, 1938)
- Stylaster brunneus Boschma, 1970
- Stylaster californicus (Verrill, 1866)
- Stylaster campylecus (Fisher, 1938)
- Stylaster carinatus Broch, 1936
- †Stylaster chibaensis Eguchi, 1954
- Stylaster cocosensis Cairns, 1991
- Stylaster complanatus Pourtalès, 1867
- †Stylaster compressus Roemer, 1863
- Stylaster corallium Cairns, 1986
- Stylaster crassior Broch, 1936
- Stylaster crassiseptum Cairns & Lindner, 2011
- †Stylaster cretaceous Jell, Cook & Jell, 2011
- Stylaster densicaulis Moseley, 1879
- Stylaster dentatus Broch, 1936
- Stylaster divergens Marenzeller, 1904
- Stylaster duchassaingi Pourtalès, 1867
- Stylaster eguchii (Boschma, 1966)
- Stylaster elassotomus Fisher, 1938
- Stylaster erubescens Pourtalès, 1868
- Stylaster filogranus Pourtalès, 1871
- Stylaster flabelliformis (Lamarck, 1816)
- Stylaster galapagensis Cairns, 1986
- Stylaster gemmascens (Esper, 1794)
- †Stylaster gigas Cairns & Grant-Mackie, 1993
- Stylaster gracilis Milne Edwards & Haime, 1850
- Stylaster granulosus Milne Edwards & Haime, 1850
- Stylaster griggi Cairns, 2005
- Stylaster griseus Cairns and Zibrowius, 2013
- Stylaster hattorii (Eguchi, 1968)
- Stylaster horologium Cairns, 1991
- Stylaster ibericus Zibrowius & Cairns, 1992
- Stylaster imbricatus Cairns, 1991
- Stylaster incompletus (Tenison Woods, 1883)
- Stylaster incrassatus Broch, 1936
- Stylaster infundibuliferus Cairns, 2005
- Stylaster inornatus Cairns, 1986
- Stylaster kenti Cairns and Zibrowius, 2013
- Stylaster laevigatus Cairns, 1986
- Stylaster leptostylus (Fisher, 1938)
- Stylaster lonchitis Broch, 1947
- Stylaster marenzelleri Cairns, 1986
- Stylaster maroccanus Zibrowius & Cairns, 1992
- Stylaster marshae Cairns, 1988
- Stylaster microstriatus Broch, 1936
- †Stylaster milleri Durham, 1942
- Stylaster miniatus (Pourtalès, 1868)
- †Stylaster mooraboolensis (Hall, 1893)
- Stylaster multiplex Hickson & England, 1905
- Stylaster nobilis (Saville Kent, 1871)
- Stylaster norvegicus (Gunnerus, 1768)
- Stylaster papuensis Zibrowius, 1981
- Stylaster parageus (Fisher, 1938)
- Stylaster polymorphus (Broch, 1936)
- †Stylaster priscus Reuss, 1872
- Stylaster profundiporus Broch, 1936
- Stylaster profundus (Moseley, 1879)
- Stylaster pulcher Quelch, 1884
- Stylaster purpuratus (Naumov, 1960)
- Stylaster ramosus Broch, 1947
- Stylaster repandus Cairns & Lindner, 2011
- Stylaster robustus (Cairns, 1983)
- Stylaster rosaceus (Greeff, 1886)
- Stylaster roseus (Pallas, 1766)
- Stylaster sanguineus Valenciennes in Milne Edwards & Haime, 1850
- Stylaster scabiosus Broch, 1935
- Stylaster solidus Broch, 1935
- Stylaster spatula Cairns, 1986
- Stylaster stejnegeri (Fisher, 1938)
- Stylaster stellulatus Stewart, 1878
- Stylaster subviolacea (Kent, 1871)
- Stylaster tenisonwoodsi Cairns, 1988
- Stylaster trachystomus (Fisher, 1938)
- Stylaster venustus (Verrill, 1870)
- Stylaster verrillii (Dall, 1884)
