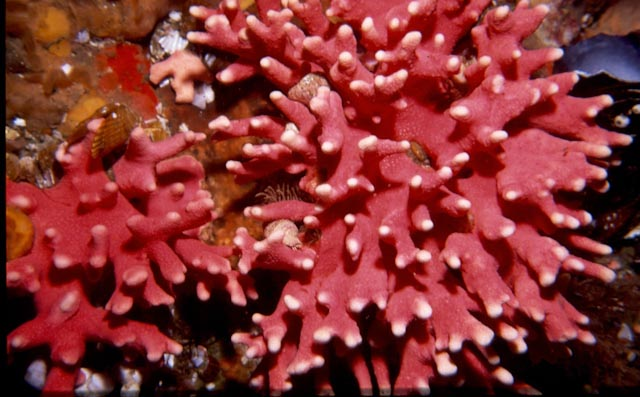
- Stylaster nobilis

Scientific classification
- Kingdom: Animalia
- Phylum: Cnidaria
- Class: Hydrozoa
- Order: Anthoathecata
- Suborder: Filifera
- Family: Stylasteridae; Gray, 1847

Genera
- See text

Synonyms
- Adeloporinae Cairns, 1982; Distichoporinae Stechow, 1921; Stylasterinae Gray, 1847

= Stylasteridae =

Family of hydrozoans

Stylasteridae, also known as lace corals, is a family of colonial hydrozoans with a calcified skeleton. They first appeared 65 million years ago in deep waters. About 10% of the species have adapted to live in water less than 50 metres (164 feet) deep. The rest are found in deeper water, most commonly between 200 and 400 metres (656 and 1,312 feet), with the deepest known species observed at a depth of 2,789 metres (9,150 feet).

In shallow reefs the Stylasteridae can grow up to 25 centimetres (9.8 in) tall and 30 centimetres (12 in) wide, but some species in deeper waters can reach 1 metre (3 ft 3 in).

== Genera ==
According to the World Register of Marine Species, the following genera belong to this family:

- Adelopora Cairns, 1982
- Astya Stechow, 1921d
- Axoporella †
- Calyptopora Boschma, 1968
- Cheiloporidion Cairns, 1983
- Congregopora Nielsen, 1919 †
- Conopora Moseley, 1879
- Crypthelia Milne Edwards & Haime, 1849
- Cyclohelia Cairns, 1991
- Distichopora Lamarck, 1816
- Errina Gray, 1835
- Errinopora Fisher, 1938
- Errinopsis Broch, 1951
- Gyropora Boschma, 1960
- Inferiolabiata Broch, 1951
- Lepidopora Pourtalès, 1871
- Lepidotheca Cairns, 1983
- Leptohelia Lindner, Cairns & Zibrowius, 2014
- Paraerrina Broch, 1942
- Phalangopora Kirkpatrick, 1887
- Pliobothrus Pourtalès, 1868
- Pseudocrypthelia Cairns, 1983
- Sporadopora Moseley, 1879
- Stellapora Cairns, 1983
- Stenohelia Kent, 1870
- Stephanohelia Cairns, 1991
- Stylantheca Fischer, 1931
- Stylaster Gray, 1831
- Systemapora Cairns, 1991
