= Coleodesmium =

Coleodesmium may refer to:

- Coleodesmium (worm), a genus of worms in the family Torquaratoridae
- Coleodesmium (alga), a genus of algae in the family Microchaetaceae
