= Allapasus =

Scientific classification
- Kingdom: Animalia
- Phylum: Hemichordata
- Class: Enteropneusta
- Family: Torquaratoridae
- Genus: Allapasus; Holland, Kuhnz & Osborn, 2012

Type species
- Allapasus aurantiacus Holland, Kuhnz & Osborn, 2012

Species
- See text

Genus of acorn worm

Allapasus is a genus of acorn worms belonging to the family Torquaratoridae.

== Species ==
The following species are recognised in the genus Allapasus:

- A. aurantiacus Holland, Kuhnz & Osborn, 2012
- A. isidis Priede, Osborn, Gebruk, Jones, Shale, Rogacheva & Holland, 2012
- A. fuscus Jabr, Archambault & Cameron, 2018
