= Torquarator =

Scientific classification
- Kingdom: Animalia
- Phylum: Hemichordata
- Class: Enteropneusta
- Family: Torquaratoridae
- Genus: Torquarator; Holland, Clague, Gordon, Gebruk, Pawson & Vecchione, 2005
- Species: T. bullocki

Binomial name
- Torquarator bullocki Holland, Clague, Gordon, Gebruk, Pawson & Vecchione, 2005

Genus of acorn worm

Torquarator is a genus of acorn worms belonging to the family Torquaratoridae. It contains a single species, Torquarator bullocki. The holotype, an adult female, was found at depths of 1,901 meters (6,237 ft) in the Northeast Pacific Ocean, measuring 70 millimeters (2.8 in) long and 15 millimeters (0.59 in) wide at the collar.
