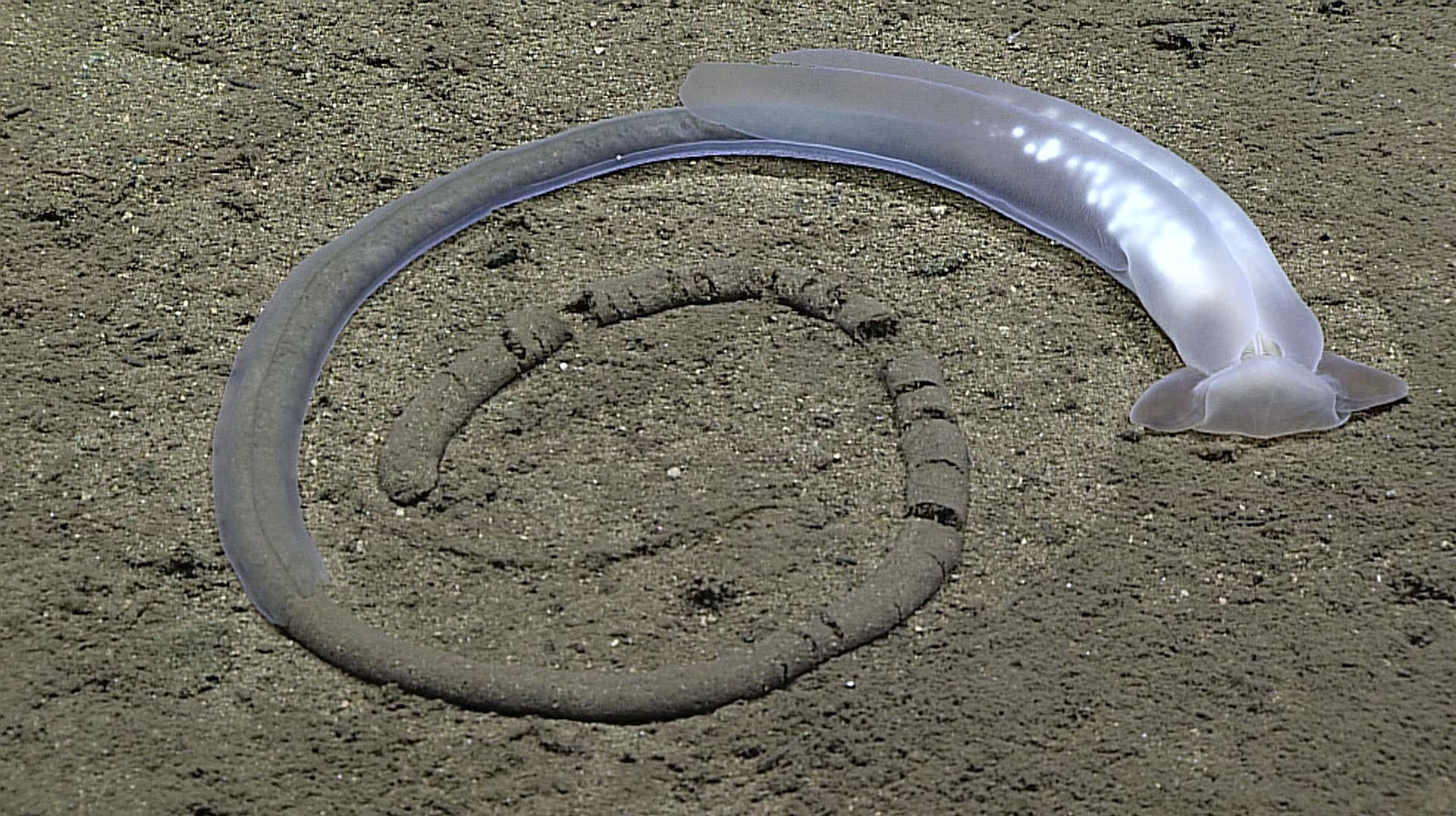
- Unidentified species of Tergivelum

Scientific classification
- Kingdom: Animalia
- Phylum: Hemichordata
- Class: Enteropneusta
- Family: Torquaratoridae; Holland, Clague, Gordon, Gebruk, Pawson & Vecchione, 2005

Type genus
- Torquarator Holland, Clague, Gordon, Gebruk, Pawson & Vecchione, 2005

Genera
- See text

= Torquaratoridae =

Torquaratoridae Temporal range: Early Triassic (upper Olenekian)–Present

Family of acorn worms

Torquaratoridae is a family of acorn worms (Hemichordata) that live in deep waters between 350 and 4000 meters. They can grow up to 1 m (3 ft) in length and have semitransparent gelatinous bodies, often brightly colored.

== Description ==
Cilia on their underside are used to glide over the ocean floor at about 8 cm (3 in) per hour, while detritus is sucked into their gut, leaving behind a constant trail of feces. When deciding to move to new feeding locations, they empty their gut and drift over the bottom, aided by an excreted balloon of mucus.

One species (Coleodesmium karaensis) has been shown to care for the offspring by bearing about a dozen embryos surrounded by a thin membrane in shallow depressions on the surface of the mother's pharyngeal region.

The proboscis skeleton is reduced to a small medial plate in one genus, while it is absent in the remaining species, and the stomochord reduced in adults. Terminstomo arcticus have lost the heart, blood sinus and proboscis skeleton, and has a stomochord that extends from the posterior end of the proboscis through the entire length of the collar. Their large eggs, which measure almost 2 mm across, suggest that there is direct development without larvae.

Their genitals are unusual by being located outside the body. On each side of the worm, a flap of the skin runs the entire length of the trunk. Located on the inner surfaces of these flaps, the numerous ovaries and testicles bulge outwards in an epidermal pouch attached to the rest of the body by a slender stalk. The ovaries' eggs are protected by just a single layer of cells. One species, Yoda purpurata, is also the first known hermaphroditic hemichordate. It is assumed that these modifications are an adaptation to life in their deep sea habitats.

Only one known species (Allapasus aurantiacus) is muscular and robust enough to burrow into substrates. The other species have a very reduced body musculature and are too gelatinous and fragile to do so. Instead they live directly on the seafloor. The extra-wide-lipped species shows the most obvious adaptations to the free living lifestyle, and they are found almost exclusively on rocks of deep-sea lava formations. Some Antarctic species have been found to make tubes in sediments that can last for days, resembling some Cambrian species as Spartobranchus tenuis.

At depths between 1500 and 3700 m, these animals are often the most numerous, along with echinoderms, molluscs, crustaceans and fish.

== Classification ==
The following genera are recognized in the family Torquaratoridae:

- Allapasus Holland, Kuhnz & Osborn, 2012
- Coleodesmium Osborn, Gebruk, Rogacheva & Holland, 2013
- Quatuoralisia Ezhova & Lukinykh, 2022
- Tergivelum Holland, Jones, Ellena, Ruhl & Smith, 2009
- Terminstomo Jabr, Archambault & Cameron, 2018
- Torquarator Holland, Clague, Gordon, Gebruk, Pawson & Vecchione, 2005
- Yoda Priede, Osborn, Gebruk, Jones, Shale, Rogacheva & Holland, 2012

=== Internal relationships ===
An phylogenetic analysis of torquaratorids by Holland and colleagues in 2022 obtained the following maximum likelihood phylogenetic tree based on mitochondrial 16S rRNA and nuclear 18S rRNA genes:

- Torquaratoridae
  - Yoda
    - Yoda purpurata
    - - Yoda demiankoopi
      - Yoda 'B sp. 2'
  - - - Tergivelum
        - Tergivelum balwini
        - Tergivelum cinnabarinum
      - Allapasus
        - Allapasus aurantiacus
        - Allapasus isidis
    - - Narrow-lipped/Genus C
      - - Quatuoralisia malakhovi
        - - Coleodesmium karaensis
          - H90 Antarctica
