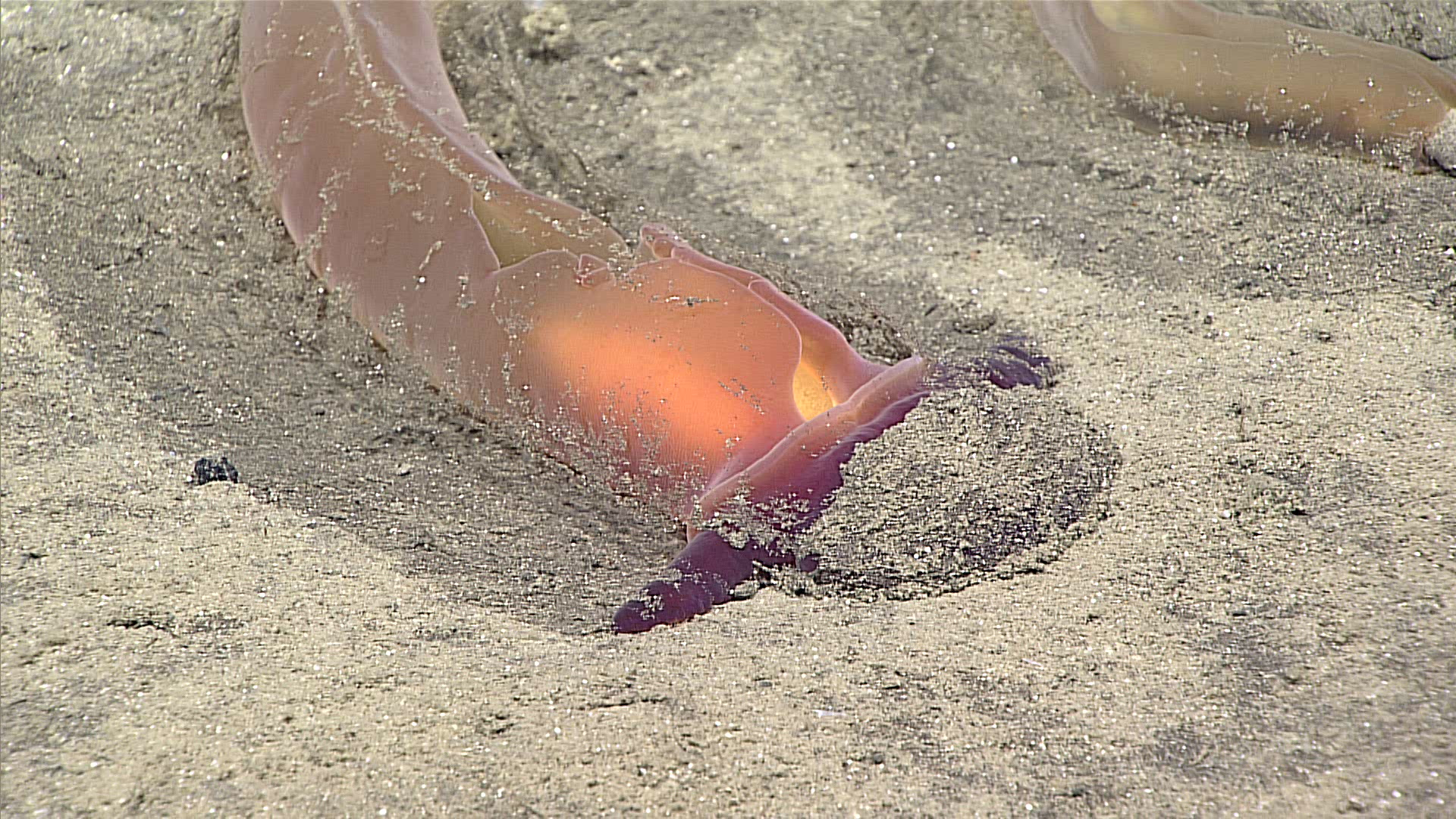
- cf. Yoda purpurata
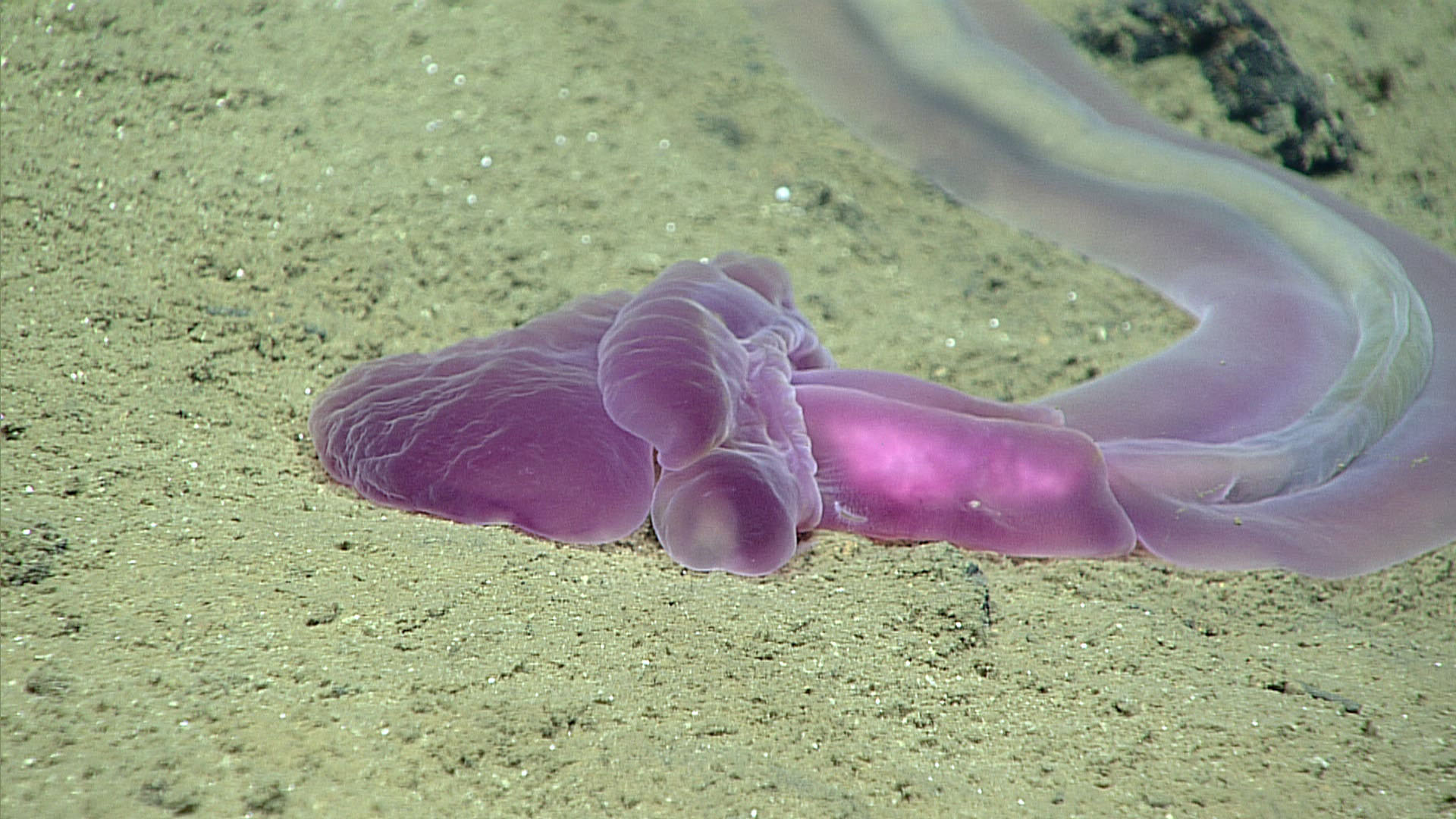
- cf. Yoda purpurata

Scientific classification
- Kingdom: Animalia
- Phylum: Hemichordata
- Class: Enteropneusta
- Family: Torquaratoridae
- Genus: Yoda
- Species: Y. purpurata

Binomial name
- Yoda purpurata Priede, Osborn, Gebruk, Jones, Shale, Rogacheva & Holland, 2012

= Yoda purpurata =

Species of enteropneust in the hemichordate phylum

Yoda purpurata is a species of acorn worm in the family Torquaratoridae. It was the first described species of the genus Yoda, found at 2.5 km (about 1.5 miles) below the surface of the Atlantic ocean.
