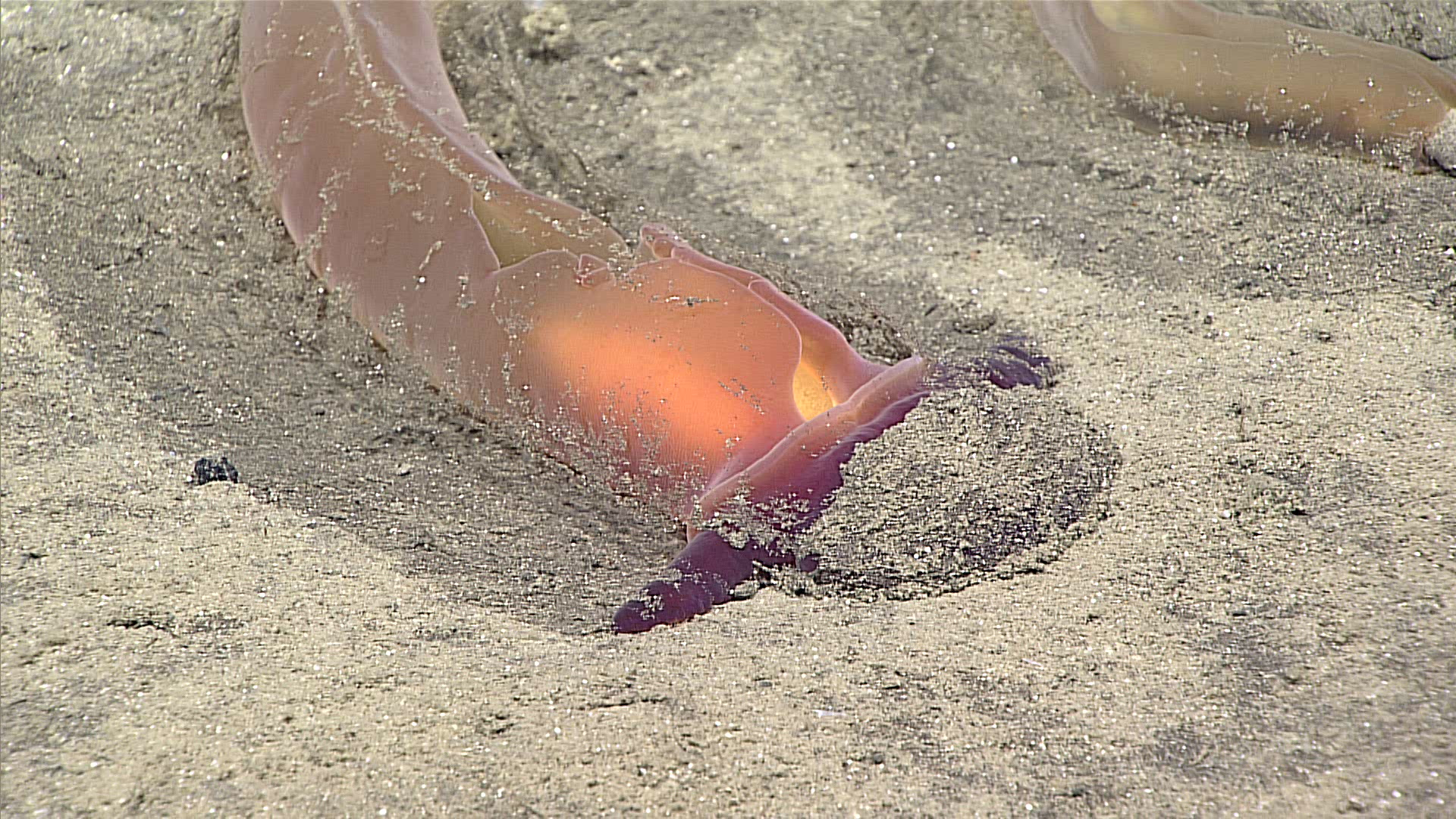
- cf. Yoda purpurata
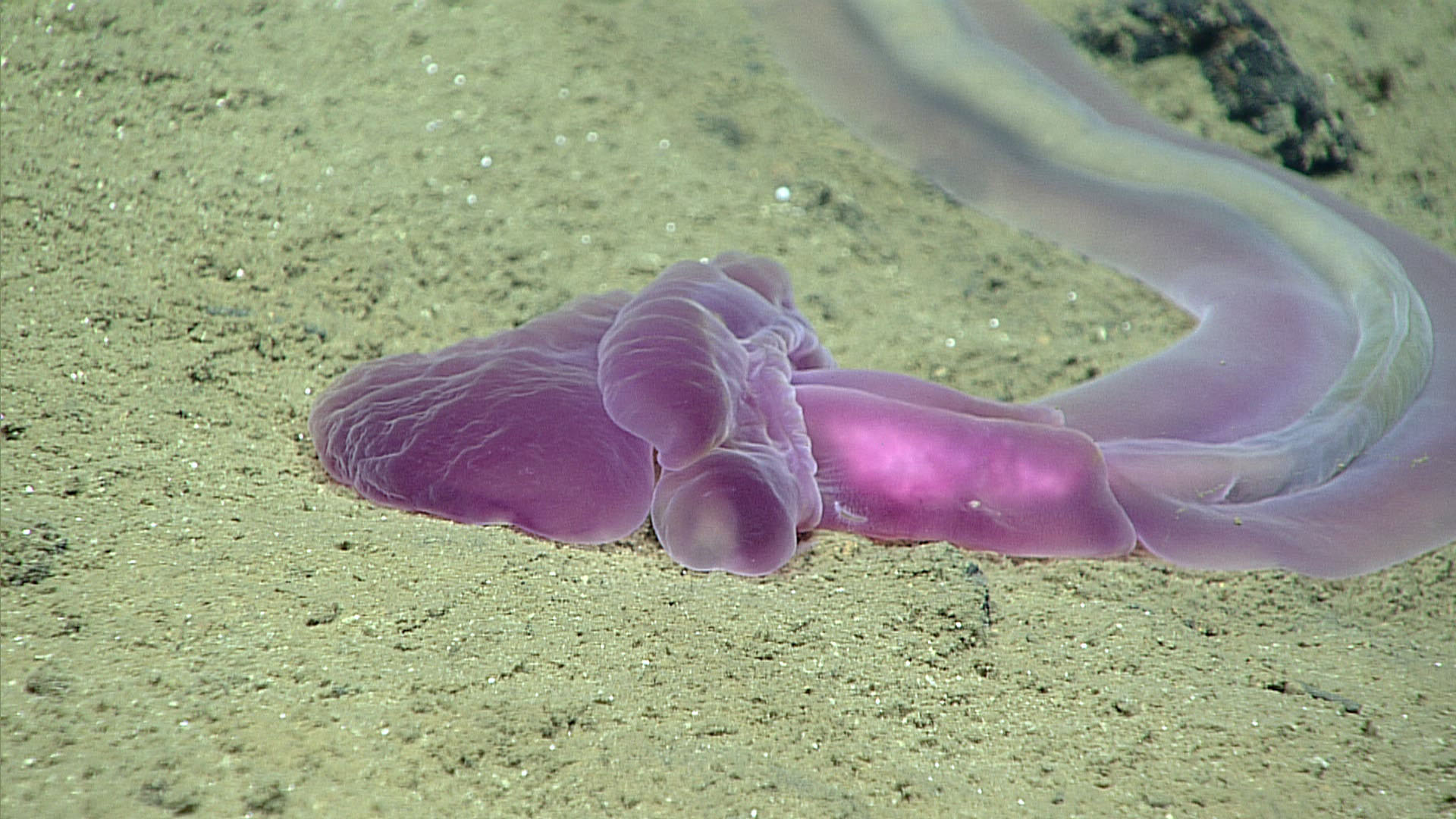
- cf. Yoda purpurata

Scientific classification
- Kingdom: Animalia
- Phylum: Hemichordata
- Class: Enteropneusta
- Family: Torquaratoridae
- Genus: Yoda; Priede, Osborn, Gebruk, Jones, Shale, Rogacheva & Holland, 2012

Species
- Y. purpurata Priede, Osborn, Gebruk, Jones, Shale, Rogacheva & Holland, 2012; Y. demiankoopi Holland, Hiley & Rouse, 2022

= Yoda (acorn worm) =

Genus of enteropneust in the hemichordate phylum

Yoda is a genus of acorn worm in the family Torquaratoridae. Its first described species, Yoda purpurata, was discovered 2.5 km (about 1.5 miles) below the surface of the Atlantic ocean. Ranging from 12 to 19 cm (4.7 to 7.5 in) in length, it was named after the fictional character Yoda from the Star Wars franchise.

It was the first known hermaphroditic member within the phylum. The other known hermaphroditic member of the phylum is Yoda demiankoopi discovered in 2021. Even if both male and female sex organs are present, the different individuals are acting as either male or female, not both, which makes them sequential hermaphrodites, alternating between male and female over the course of their lives.
