= Coleodesmium karaensis =

Scientific classification
- Kingdom: Animalia
- Phylum: Hemichordata
- Class: Enteropneusta
- Family: Torquaratoridae
- Genus: Coleodesmium; Osborn, Gebruk, Rogacheva & Holland, 2013
- Species: C. karaensis

Binomial name
- Coleodesmium karaensis Osborn, Gebruk, Rogacheva & Holland, 2013

Species of acorn worm

Coleodesmium is a monotypic genus of worms belonging to the family Torquaratoridae. Its only species is Coleodesmium karaensis. It is found in Arctic Russia.
